= National Register of Historic Places listings in McLean County, Illinois =

Location of McLean County in Illinois

This is a list of the National Register of Historic Places listings in McLean County, Illinois.

This is intended to be a complete list of the properties and districts on the National Register of Historic Places in McLean County, Illinois, United States. Latitude and longitude coordinates are provided for many National Register properties and districts; these locations may be seen together in a map.

There are 36 properties and districts listed on the National Register in the county, including 1 National Historic Landmark. Another two properties were once listed, but have since been removed.

This National Park Service list is complete through NPS recent listings posted December 19, 2025.

== Current listings ==
	Name on the Register	Image	Date listed	Location	City or town	Description
1	Warren Bane Site	Warren Bane Site	March 19, 1982 (#82002588)	Northeast of the junction of 3000E and 750N; 40°23′51″N 88°40′44″W	Ellsworth	
2	Ruben M. Benjamin House	Ruben M. Benjamin House	August 30, 1978 (#78003109)	510 East Grove Street; 40°28′41″N 88°59′16″W	Bloomington	
3	Benjaminville Friends Meetinghouse and Burial Ground	Benjaminville Friends Meetinghouse and Burial Ground	December 13, 1983 (#83003584)	North of Holder; 40°28′35″N 88°48′21″W	Holder	
4	Bloomington Central Business District	Bloomington Central Business District	February 28, 1985 (#85000363)	Roughly bounded by Main, Center and Front Streets; 40°28′50″N 88°59′35″W	Bloomington	
5	Bloomington High School	Bloomington High School	April 19, 2018 (#100002327)	510 E Washington St. 40°28′47″N 88°59′15″W	Bloomington	The old high school building on East Washington Street, not the current high school.
6	Camelback Bridge	Camelback Bridge	May 15, 1997 (#97000383)	Virginia Avenue, across the Constitution Trail; 40°29′53″N 88°59′01″W	Normal	
7	Cedar Crest Addition Historic District	Cedar Crest Addition Historic District	November 15, 2006 (#06001022)	Roughly bounded by Constitutional Trail, Division Street, Highland Avenue and Fell Avenue; 40°29′46″N 88°59′07″W	Normal	
8	Children's Village-Illinois Soldiers' and Sailors' Children's School	Children's Village-Illinois Soldiers' and Sailors' Children's School	May 21, 2018 (#100002418)	1100 N Beech St. 40°31′09″N 88°58′40″W	Normal	
9	Clover Lawn	Clover Lawn	October 18, 1972 (#72001479)	1000 East Monroe Drive; 40°28′56″N 88°58′47″W	Bloomington	
10	John W. Cook Hall	John W. Cook Hall	February 20, 1986 (#86000268)	Illinois State University, U.S. Route 51; 40°30′33″N 88°59′32″W	Normal	
11	George H. Cox House	George H. Cox House	November 14, 1985 (#85002838)	701 East Grove Street; 40°28′40″N 88°59′08″W	Bloomington	
12	David Davis III & IV House	David Davis III & IV House	November 12, 1982 (#82000400)	1005 East Jefferson; 40°28′50″N 88°58′48″W	Bloomington	
13	Duncan Manor	Duncan Manor	February 9, 1979 (#79003164)	Southwest of Towanda off Illinois Route 4; 40°33′06″N 88°54′36″W	Towanda	
14	East Grove Street District–Bloomington	East Grove Street District–Bloomington	February 26, 1987 (#86003176)	400–700 East Grove Street; 40°28′39″N 88°59′22″W	Bloomington	
15	Fairview Sanatorium	Fairview Sanatorium	September 1, 2021 (#100006867)	905 North Main St. 40°31′25″N 88°59′45″W	Normal	
16	Franklin Square	Franklin Square	January 11, 1976 (#76002164)	300 and 400 blocks of East Chestnut and East Walnut Streets, 900 block of North Prairie and North McLean Streets; 40°29′12″N 88°59′25″W	Bloomington	
17	Robert Greenlee House	Robert Greenlee House	February 7, 1997 (#97000033)	806 North Evans Street; 40°29′06″N 88°59′14″W	Bloomington	
18	John M. Hamilton House	John M. Hamilton House	September 6, 1978 (#78003110)	502 South Clayton Street; 40°28′33″N 88°59′10″W	Bloomington	
19	Holy Trinity Church Rectory and Convent	Holy Trinity Church Rectory and Convent	December 8, 1983 (#83003585)	704 North Main and 106 West Chestnut Streets; 40°29′06″N 88°59′39″W	Bloomington	
20	Hubbard House	Hubbard House	February 1, 1979 (#79003163)	310 Broadway; 40°36′33″N 88°59′15″W	Hudson	
21	LeRoy Commercial Historic District	LeRoy Commercial Historic District	February 16, 1996 (#96000089)	111–123, 200–223, 300 Center and 106–118 Chestnut Streets; 40°20′49″N 88°45′38″W	Le Roy	
22	McLean County Courthouse and Square	McLean County Courthouse and Square	February 6, 1973 (#73002160)	Main, Washington, Center, and Jefferson Streets; 40°28′40″N 88°59′39″W	Bloomington	
23	George H. Miller House	George H. Miller House	July 20, 1978 (#78003111)	405 West Market Street; 40°28′56″N 88°59′48″W	Bloomington	
24	Miller–Davis Law Buildings	Miller–Davis Law Buildings	April 27, 1979 (#79003162)	101–103 North Main Street and 102–104 East Front Street; 40°28′48″N 88°59′35″W	Bloomington	
25	Noble-Wieting		December 30, 2025 (#100012469)	Address Restricted	Heyworth vicinity	
26	Normal Theater	Normal Theater	July 25, 1997 (#97000818)	209 North Street; 40°30′33″N 88°59′11″W	Normal	
27	John Patton Log Cabin	John Patton Log Cabin	August 1, 1986 (#86002008)	Lexington Park District Park; 40°38′55″N 88°46′48″W	Lexington	
28	Matthew T. Scott House	Matthew T. Scott House	February 10, 1983 (#83000331)	227 1st Avenue; 40°44′21″N 88°43′41″W	Chenoa	
29	Scott–Vrooman House	Scott–Vrooman House	August 18, 1983 (#83000330)	701 East Taylor Street; 40°28′33″N 88°59′07″W	Bloomington	
30	Sprague's Super Service	Sprague's Super Service	April 25, 2008 (#08000327)	305 E. Pine St. 40°31′03″N 88°58′51″W	Normal	
31	Stevenson House	Stevenson House	May 24, 1974 (#74002196)	1316 East Washington Street; 40°28′18″N 88°58′11″W	Bloomington	
32	US Army Aircraft C-53-DO-41-20124		August 1, 1996 (#96000857)	1.25 miles (2.01 km) east of junction of Illinois Route 9 and Interstate 55 Business; 40°29′07″N 88°55′52″W	Bloomington	
33	David Hyatt Van Dolah House	David Hyatt Van Dolah House	September 14, 2015 (#15000590)	10 N. Spencer St. 40°38′32″N 88°47′37″W	Lexington	
34	Margaret and Bird Van Leer Broadview Mansion	Margaret and Bird Van Leer Broadview Mansion	June 7, 2016 (#16000327)	1301 S. Fell Avenue; 40°29′49″N 88°59′14″W	Normal	
35	White Building	White Building	June 17, 1994 (#94000612)	215–223 East Douglas Street; 40°28′58″N 88°59′28″W	Bloomington	
36	White Place Historic District	White Place Historic District	August 12, 1988 (#88001230)	White Place, Clinton Boulevard, and east side of Fell Avenue between Empire and Emerson Streets; 40°29′27″N 88°59′06″W	Bloomington	

== Former listings ==
	Name on the Register	Image	Date listed	Date removed	Location	City or town	Description
1	Jesse Fell House		April 19, 1978 (#78003112)	October 29, 1980	502 S. Fell St.	Normal	Demolished in 1980.
2	Gildersleeve House		July 28, 1977 (#77001517)	January 2, 2020	108 Broadway; 40°36′25″N 88°59′18″W	Hudson	Demolished in 2000.

== See also ==
- List of National Historic Landmarks in Illinois
- National Register of Historic Places listings in Illinois
