= Miller Park (Bloomington, Illinois) =

Public park in Illinois, United States

Coordinates: 40°28′04″N 89°00′17″W

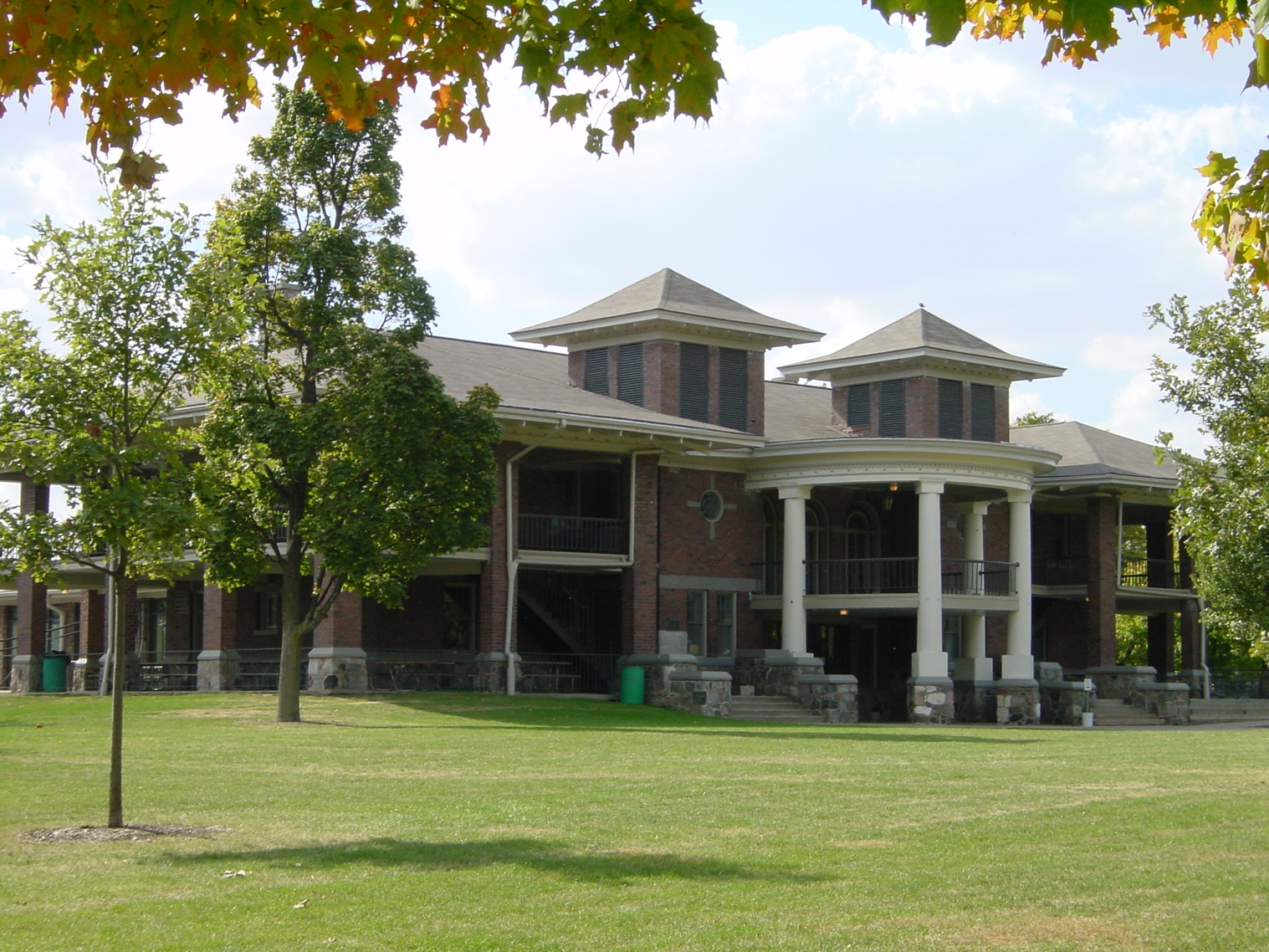
Miller Park pavilion

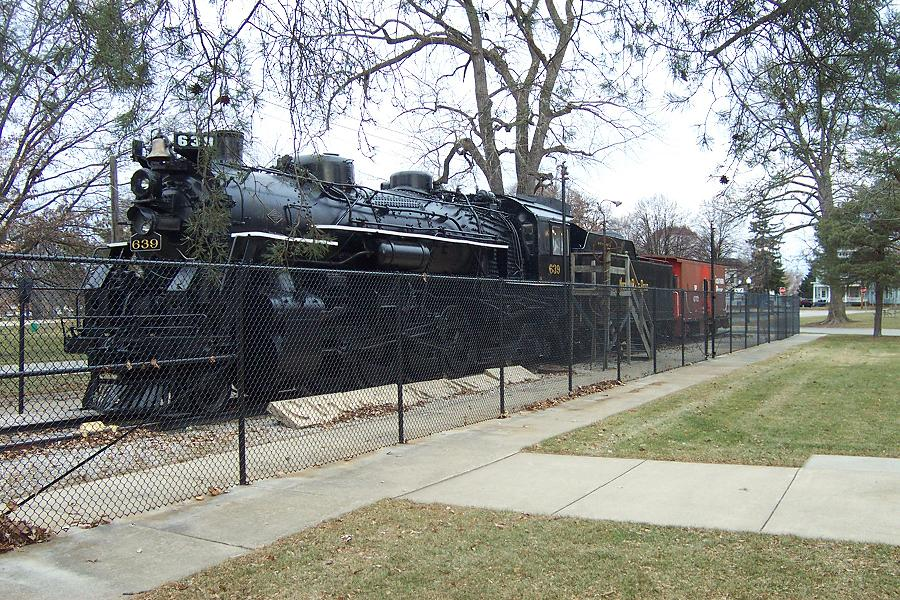
Miller Park's train

Miller Park is a public park in Bloomington, Illinois, United States. It is in the southwest part of the city, on a large block south of Wood Street and east of Morris Avenue.

The park features a pavilion, an artificial lake, a zoo, softball fields, two war memorials, and a preserved steam locomotive, its tender (rail) and a caboose from the Nickel Plate Road which formerly served the area. The park also includes a mini golf course, sand volleyball courts and a playground.

During the warm weather of summer an outdoor theater provides productions for local people. On July 4 the park hosts a fireworks display which is launched over the lake.

== Monkey Island ==
Miller Park was also once home to what the locals called "Monkey Island" during the 1960s. In the middle of man-made Miller Park Lake, there stood a platform with the metal dome that once belonged to McLean County Courthouse, on which they had a live monkey exhibit, designed by Grover Kathoffer. Though the exhibit has long been gone, many of the local residents remember the "Monkey Island" that once was.

== See also ==
- List of historical sites related to the Illinois labor movement#Railroad Workers' Monument — description of the railroad monument and train
