= Moses Montefiore Congregation =

Reform synagogue in Bloomington, Illinois, United States

- Location in Illinois

Religion
- Affiliation: Reform Judaism
- Ecclesiastical or organizational status: Synagogue
- Leadership: Rabbi Rebecca L. Dubowe
- Status: Active

Location
- Location: 102 Robinhood Lane, Bloomington, Illinois 61701
- Country: United States
- Interactive map of Moses Montefiore Congregation
- Coordinates: 40°29′29″N 88°57′59″W

Architecture
- Architect: George Miller (1889)
- Type: Synagogue
- Style: Romanesque Revival /; Moorish Revival (1889)
- Established: 1884 (as a congregation)
- Completed: 1889 (Monroe and Prairie Sts.); 1959 (Fairway Knolls)
- Construction cost: $160,000 (1959)

Website
- mosesmontefioretemple.org

The Moses Montefiore Congregation is a Reform Jewish congregation and synagogue located at 102 Robinhood Lane in Bloomington, Illinois, in the United States.

== History ==
Although Jews had arrived in Bloomington by the 1850s, the synagogue was organized in 1884 and named for Sir Moses Montefiore. On May 21, 1889, the congregation dedicated a Romanesque Revival / Moorish Revival synagogue building at the southeast corner of Monroe and Prairie Streets. It is one of the relatively few surviving 19th century synagogue buildings in the United States.

In 1959 the congregation moved to a new building in the Fairway Knolls neighborhood.

As of 1996 the Monroe and Prairie Streets former synagogue building was used as a Baptist church. Peter Warshaw purchased the property in 1993 and the former synagogue and former church was subsequently converted in a private residence. The new owners won the Landmarks Illinois 2001 Adaptive Reuse Award.

== See also ==
- History of the Jews in Chicago
