= White Building (Bloomington, Illinois) =

- U.S. National Register of Historic Places
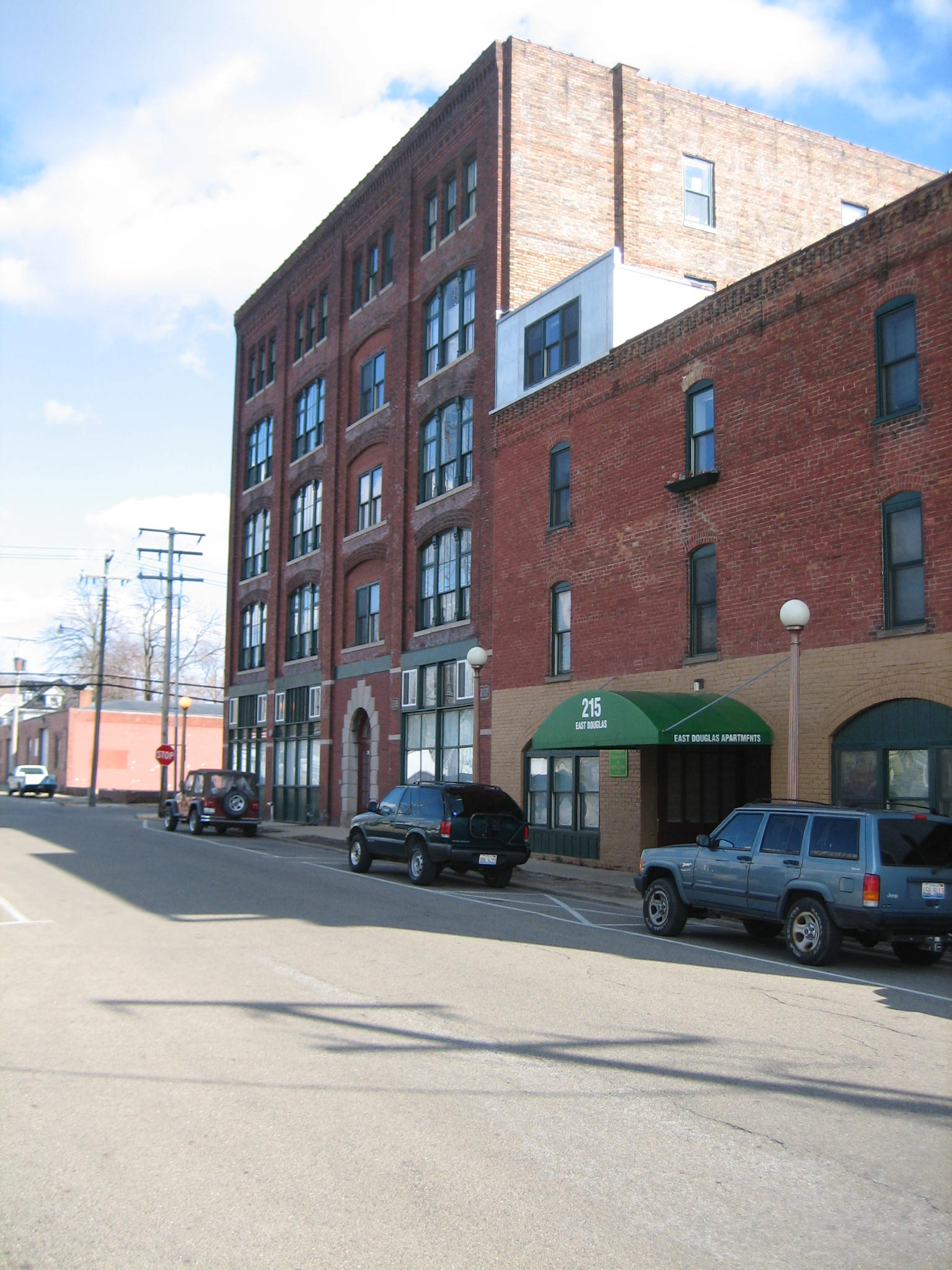
- Front of the building

- Location within Illinois Location within the United States
- Location: 215-223 E. Douglas St., Bloomington, Illinois
- Coordinates: 40°28′57″N 88°59′29″W
- Area: Less than 1 acre (0.40 ha)
- Built: 1894-1895
- Built by: Samuel R. White
- Architectural style: Chicago School
- NRHP reference No.: 94000612
- Added to NRHP: June 17, 1994

The White Building, also known as the Heberling Building, is located in the city of Bloomington, Illinois, United States. Located along Bloomington's East Douglas Street, the building was added to the National Register of Historic Places in June 1994 and represents one of the better examples of Commercial style architecture still extant in the city. It was built by Bloomington resident Samuel R. White in 1894–1895 to house his furniture sales company. By 1903 the Heberling Brothers pharmacy and their associated businesses occupied most of the building and the White company had moved its facilities to a nearby location. The White Building is a five-story red brick building which is elaborately windowed and has a three-story connected extension to its west which probably predates it.

== History ==
The White Building was constructed by Bloomington businessman Samuel R. White in 1894–1895. White came to Bloomington in 1870 by way of Huntington, Indiana, at a time when Bloomington was already an economic center with railroads leaving in eight directions from the city. in 1872 White, a building contractor, established himself as an independent contractor and constructed various buildings around the Bloomington and other Illinois cities, including the First Ward School in Bloomington and the Pullman Palace Car Company in Chicago. In 1873 White founded a coal company and lumber yard. White founded S.R. White Manufacturing in 1878; it eventually became one of Bloomington's leading manufacturers. The company began manufacturing residential furniture in an old mill located on Bloomington's Douglas Street but by 1883 they had occupied new facilities (a planing mill and factory across the street) and started to focus on the manufacture of sashes, doors, blinds and finished lumber. White's company was hit by two fires from 1884 to 1887 and the entrepreneur was forced to rebuild a safer, brick structure. White's factory was eventually expanded and it became the mill for the furniture store that White founded in 1894–1895 with the completion of the White Building.

Upon the building's completion, the Bloomington Store Fixture Company, a White-owned furniture store, occupied the top three floors of the building, the basement, and the adjoining structure to the west. On the third floor was the company's woodworking machinery, the fourth held an area for machine and bench work, and the fifth floor was utilized for finishing and storage. To the west of the structure the three-story adjacent building was used for lumber storage. That building, historically, has been described as an addition to the White Building in more than one source. However, stoned in window openings on the smaller, three-story west structure indicate that it was constructed prior to the White Building. Regardless the buildings are both historically and architecturally linked. The building's first two floor were not occupied by White's furniture company, instead they functioned as spaces for a variety of other businesses. The first floor was occupied by a pharmacy in its northeast corner while the second floor was occupied by Gordon Manufacturing Company, a manufacturer of metal oil cans. Somewhere in the building was a blacksmith shop.

A 1900 fire in Bloomington destroyed most of the downtown commercial district, though it stopped short of the White Building. In 1903 the Heberling Brothers purchased the pharmacy on the building's first floor. During the next year the Heberlings moved their own company, Heberling Medicinal and Extract Company, into the building. By 1910, with the Heberlings slowly occupying more and more of the building, the Bloomington Store Fixtures Company moved all operations to the S.R White Manufacturing Company plant, across the street from the White Building.

== Architecture ==
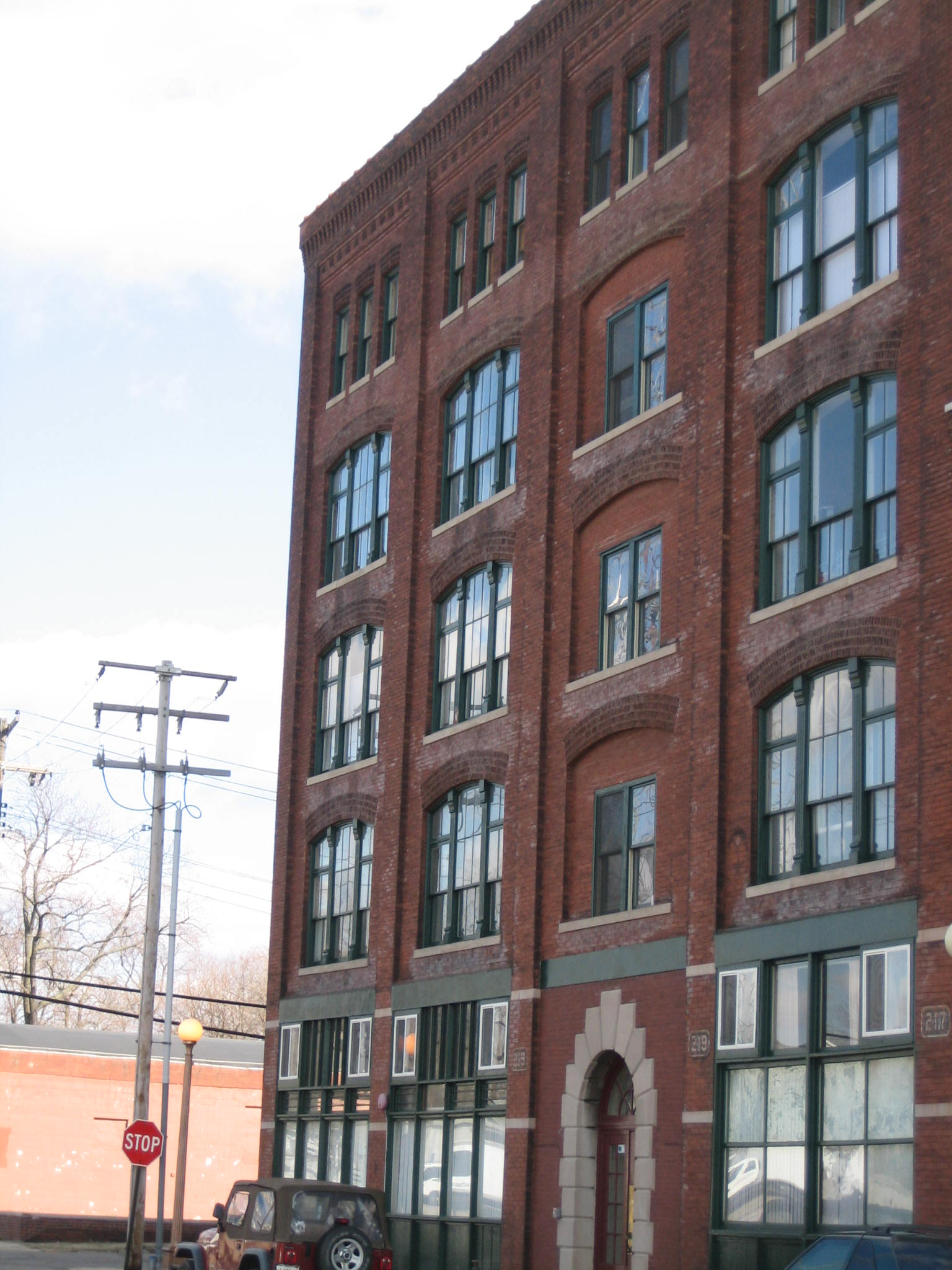
The elaborately windowed front (north) facade of the White Building

The White Building is a blend of a typical loft construction building and the desire for heightened functionality and safety while offering an aesthetically pleasing design. As such, is a prominent Bloomington example of Commercial style architecture, more commonly known as Chicago School. It is an example of the result of the dilemma between functionalism and aesthetics in the design of utilitarian buildings. The building is characterized, like others of its style, by its fenestration. Many of the features of this style are the result of the demands of business and industry.

The White Building is a five-story structure with a three-story western extension on the corner southwest corner of Douglas and Prairie Streets in Bloomington. It is located about two blocks east of the downtown Bloomington commercial historic district area. The five-story section of the property is a 112-foot (34 m) by 70-foot (21 m) rectangle, while the three-story portion is an offset 80-foot (24 m) by 50-foot (15 m) rectangle. The smaller building probably predates the larger White Building, having seen use as a possible livery stable. The smaller building was refashioned as an addition to the White Building shortly after its construction on the five-story structure was completed in 1895.

The interior of the building is timber framed construction, with the posts set 18 feet (5.5 m) apart. The exterior walls are load-bearing brick which extends to the building foundation. The windowed masonry basement extends several feet above ground level and the building's extremely low-pitch roof is not visible from street level. The three-story extension to the west of the White Building is also of timber frame and brick construction. It has a partial fourth-floor extension with a clerestory window.

== Significance ==
The White Building is a locally significant example of an industrial Commercial style building. It is the best remaining example of this type and style in the city of Bloomington. There are other examples still extant within the city though they are no longer part of their historical streetscape, mostly obscured by overpasses constructed during the 20th century. Stylistically those buildings are less sophisticated than the White Building and more utilitarian. The White Building was added to the U.S. National Register of Historic Places on June 17, 1994.
