= Bloomington, Illinois =

City in Illinois, United States

- City
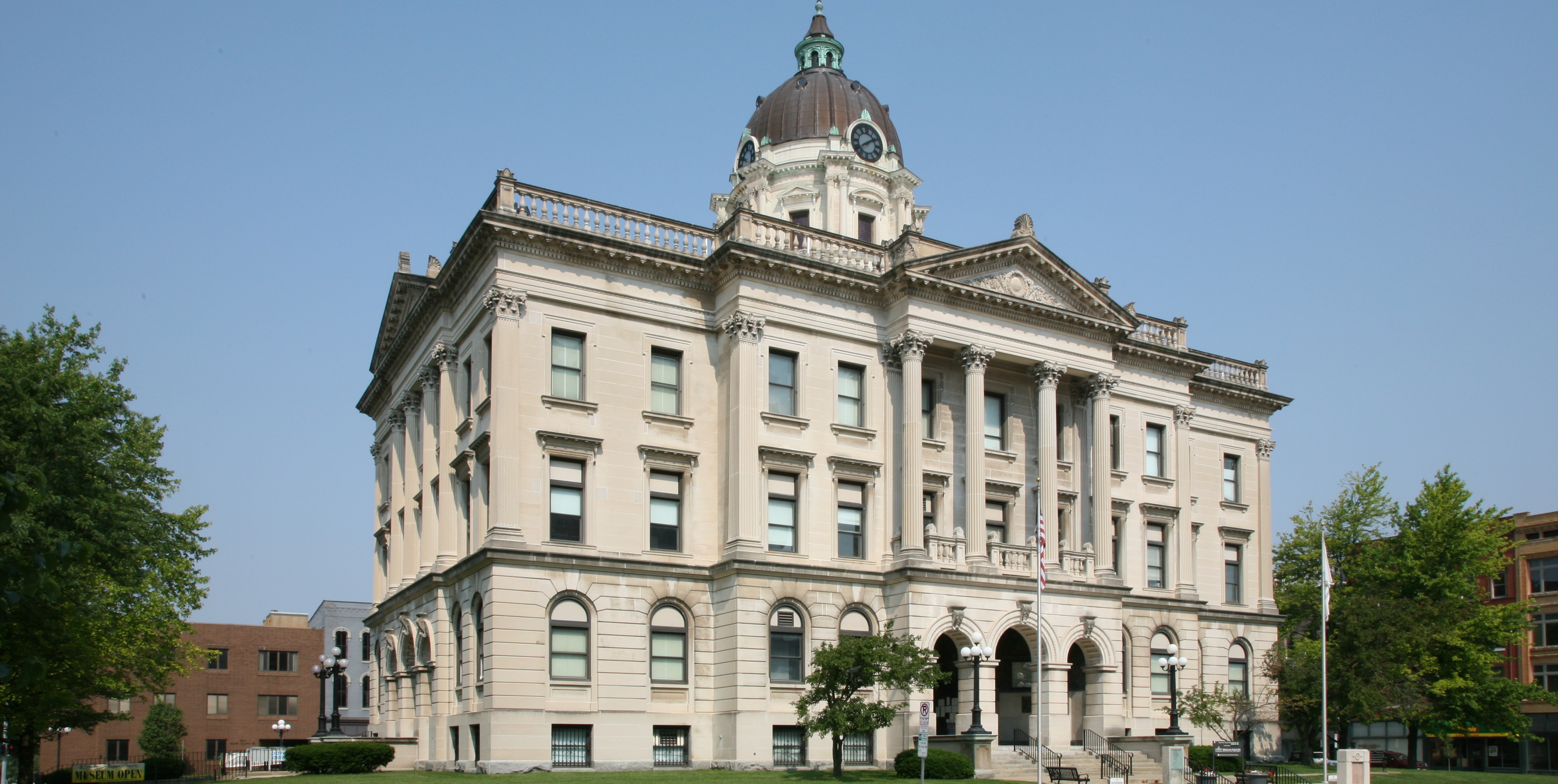
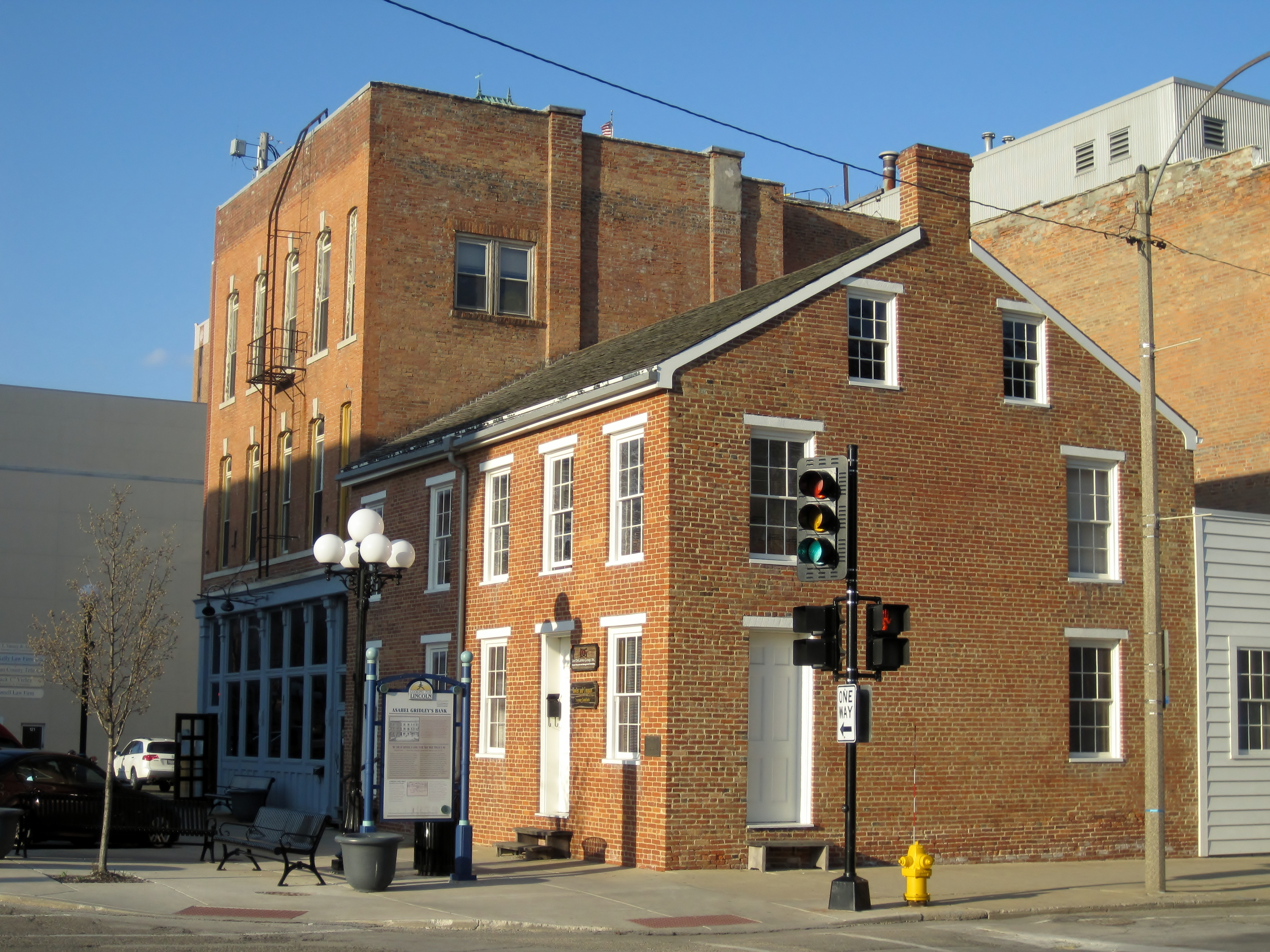
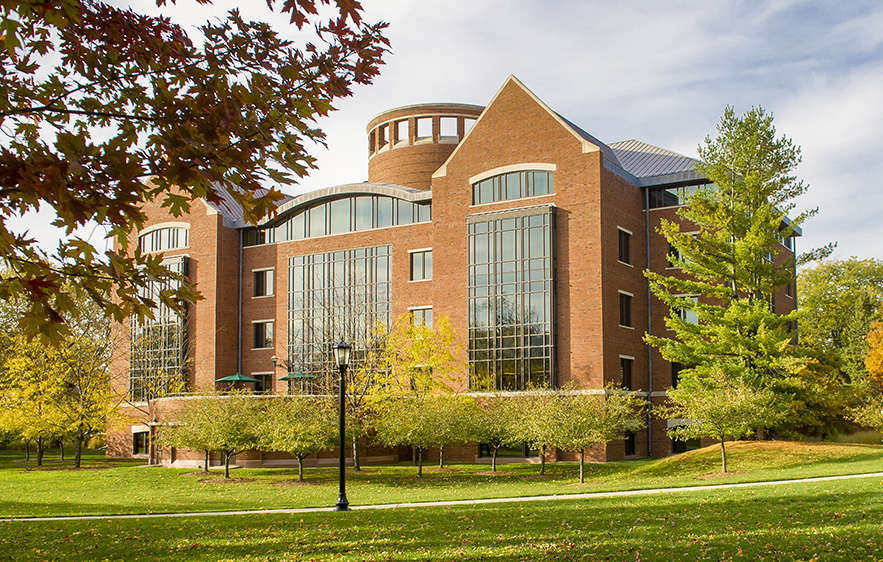
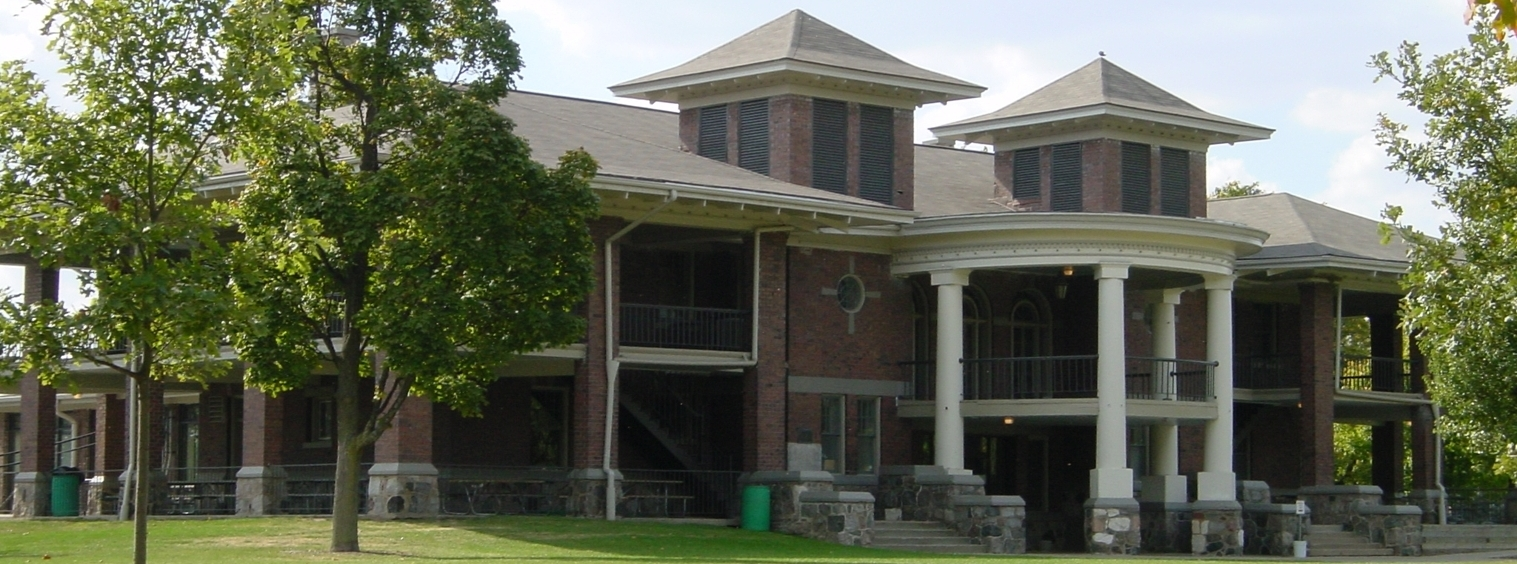
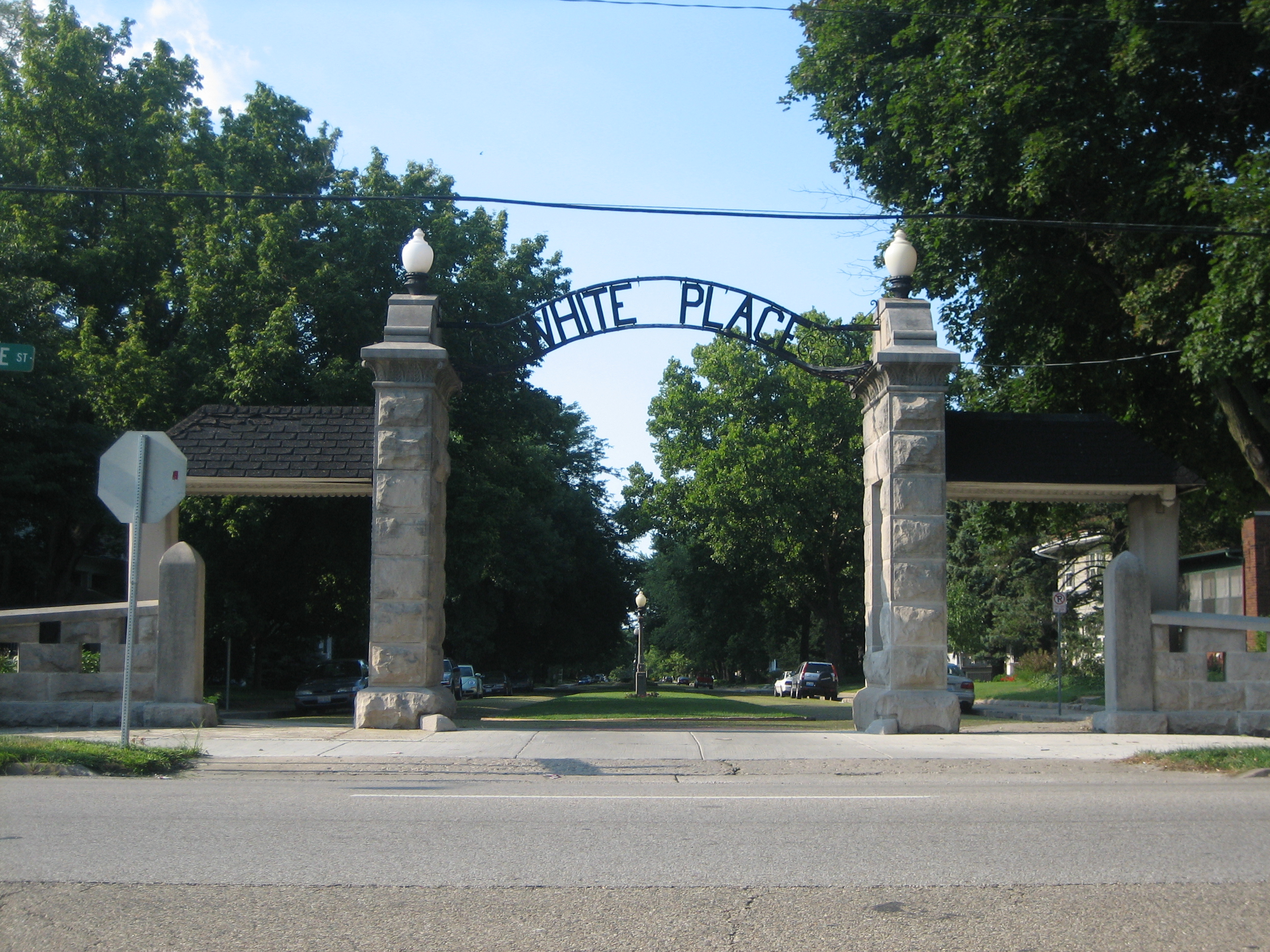
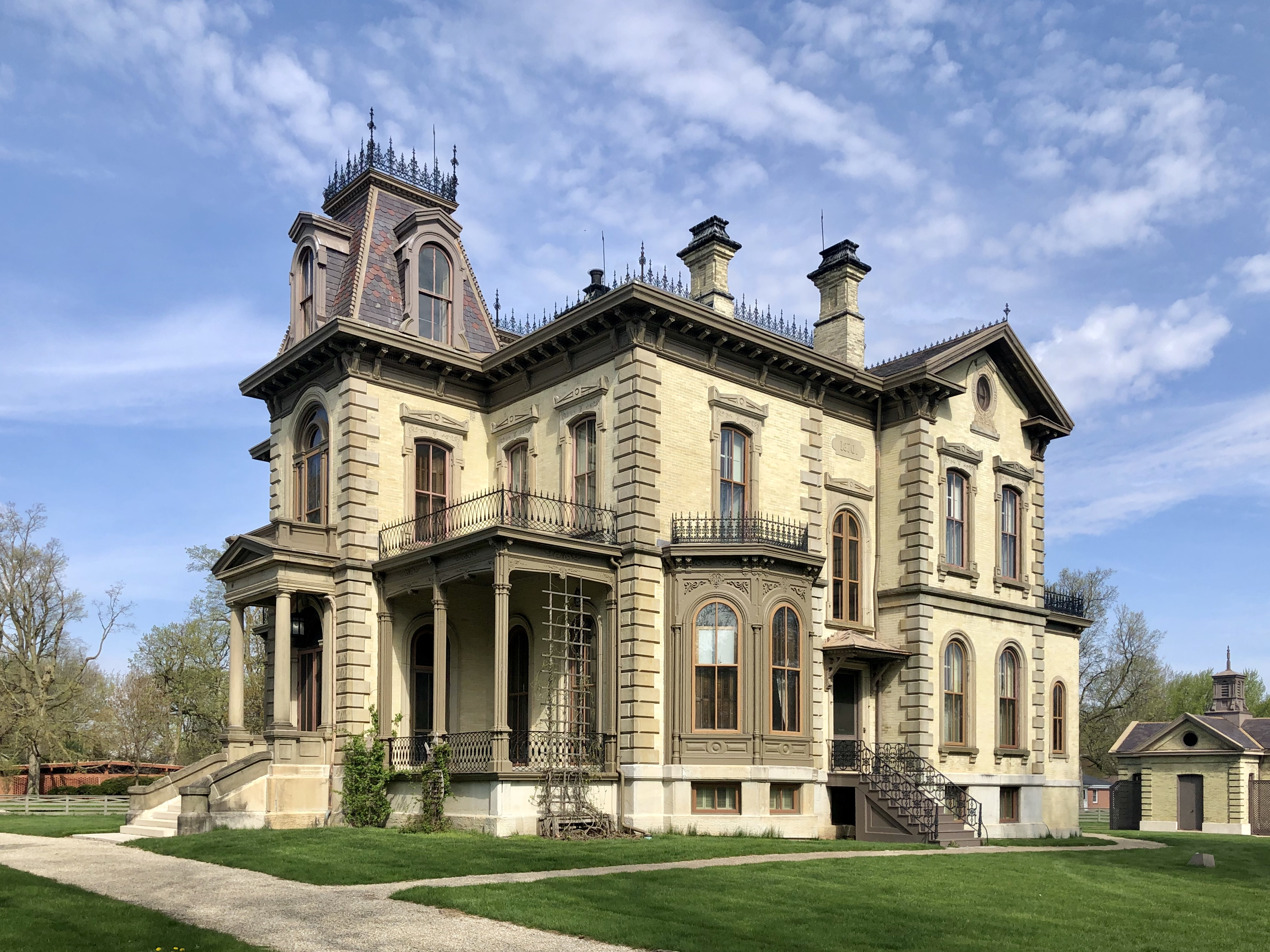
- McLean County Courthouse and Square Miller-Davis Law Buildings Illinois Wesleyan University Miller Park, home of Miller Park Zoo White Place Historic District Clover Lawn

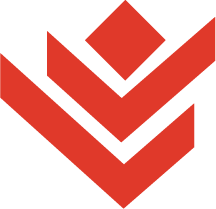
- Logo
- Interactive map of Bloomington, Illinois
- Location within Illinois Location within the United States
- Coordinates: 40°29′03″N 88°59′37″W
- Country: United States
- State: Illinois
- County: McLean
- Township: Bloomington City (coterminous)
- Founded: 1831
- Incorporated: 1831

Government
  - Type: Mayor–council–manager
  - Mayor: Dan Brady (R)
  - City manager: Jeff Jurgens

Area
  - City: 27.24 sq mi (70.56 km^{2})
  - Land: 27.12 sq mi (70.24 km^{2})
  - Water: 0.12 sq mi (0.32 km^{2})
- Elevation: 840 ft (260 m)

Population (2020)
  - City: 78,680
  - Estimate (2024): 79,232 ▲
  - Density: 2,901.3/sq mi (1,120.18/km^{2})
  - Urban: 132,600 (US: 243rd)
  - Metro: 191,067 (US: 223rd)
- Time zone: UTC−06:00 (CST)
  - Summer (DST): UTC−05:00 (CDT)
- ZIP Codes: 61701, 61704, 61705
- Area codes: 309, 861
- FIPS code: 17-06613
- GNIS ID: 2394197
- Website: www.bloomingtonil.gov

Bloomington is a city in McLean County, Illinois, United States, and its county seat. The city had a population of 78,680 as of the 2020 census, making it the 13th-most populous city in Illinois and the fifth-most populous outside the Chicago metropolitan area. It is adjacent to the town of Normal, and is the more populous of the two principal municipalities of the Bloomington–Normal metropolitan area, which has a population of roughly 170,000.

Bloomington is 135 miles (217 km) southwest of Chicago and 162 miles (261 km) northeast of St. Louis. Bloomington is home to Illinois Wesleyan University and the headquarters for State Farm and Country Financial. Bloomington is also home to the ECHL hockey team Bloomington Bison.

== History ==
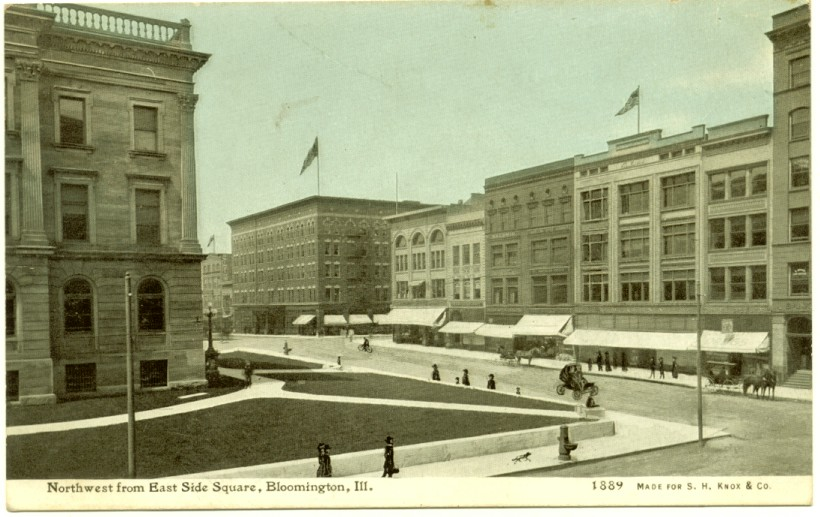
Looking northwest from the east side of the downtown square, about 1910

The Bloomington area was at the edge of a large grove occupied by the Kickapoo before the first Euro-American settlers arrived in the early 1820s. Springing from the settlement of Keg Grove, later called Blooming Grove, Bloomington was named as county seat on December 25, 1830, when McLean County was created.

When the County of McLean was incorporated, a county seat was established, but the legislation stated the site of Bloomington "would be located later." Gavin Quinn, one of the new county's promoters, offered to donate 60 acres (240,000 m^{2}) of his land for the new town. His offer was accepted, and Bloomington was laid out. Its lots were sold at a well-attended and noisy auction on July 4, 1831. At this time there were few roads, but rich soils brought new farmers who began commerce by conducting their business in the county. People came from all over to trade and do business at the town's center, known today as Downtown Bloomington, including Abraham Lincoln, who worked as a lawyer in nearby Springfield. Prominent Bloomington resident Jesse W. Fell, who founded the Bloomington Pantagraph and was most prominent in local real estate, had suggested the Lincoln-Douglas debates in 1854 and played a prominent role in pushing Lincoln to run for president.

In 1900, an officer on patrol discovered a fire in a laundry across the street from the old city hall and police station. He sounded an alarm but the fire destroyed most of the downtown, especially the areas north and east of the courthouse. The burnt area was quickly rebuilt from the designs of local architects George Miller and Paul O. Moratz.

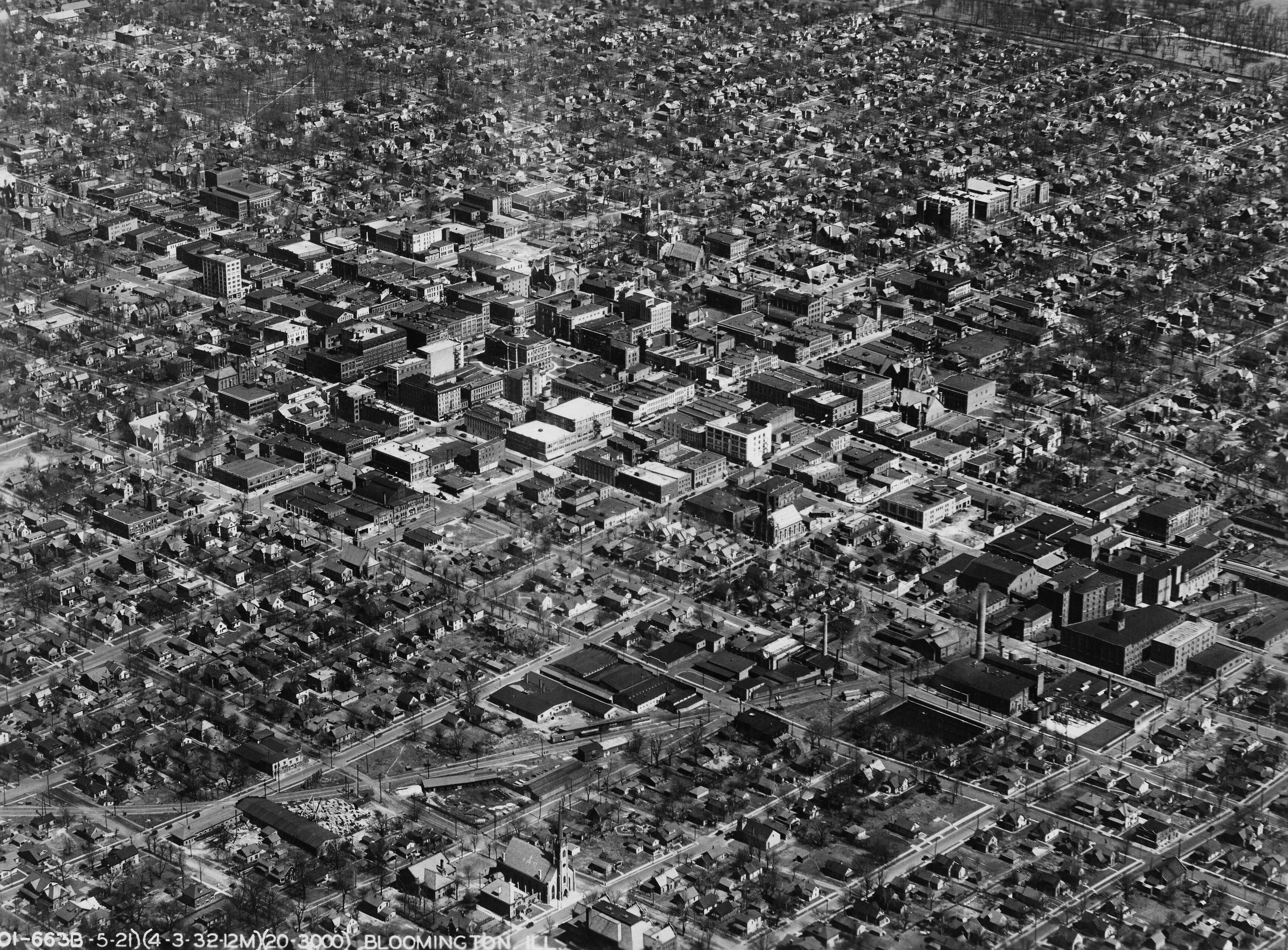
View of Bloomington, 1932

Bloomington continued to grow during the first two decades of the 20th century. Agriculture, the construction of highways and railroads, and the growth of the insurance business all influenced the growth of Bloomington and its downtown. Most notably, State Farm was founded in June 1922 by retired farmer George J. Mecherle as a mutual automobile insurance company specializing in insurance for farmers.

The 1917 Bloomington Streetcar Strike was a labor dispute starting on May 28, 1917, when Amalgamated Transit Union Local 752 called a strike for union recognition, increased pay, and a shortened workday. It ended in July when the mayor of Bloomington, E.E. Jones, mediated contract talks between the workers and company from July 6 to 9. During this, the Illinois National Guard had been stationed outside the courthouse where mediation was occurring, equipped with machine gun emplacements.

In 1997, Judy Markowitz was elected as the city's first female and Jewish mayor. During her two terms as mayor, an arena was built in downtown Bloomington and the city's performing arts center began restoration. Bloomington also approved a gay rights ordinance in 2002. In 2021, Mboka Mwilambwe was elected as the city's first black mayor.

== Geography ==
According to the 2010 census, Bloomington has an area of 27.229 square miles (70.52 km^{2}), of which 27.22 square miles (70.50 km^{2}) (99.97%) is land and 0.009 square miles (0.02 km^{2}) (0.03%) is water.

=== Climate ===
Bloomington, Illinois

Climate chart (precipitation, max. and min. temperature)
J	F	M	A	M	J	J	A	S	O	N	D
1.7 31 14	1.7 37 18	2.9 48 29	3.8 61 40	4.5 73 51	3.9 83 61	4 86 65	3.8 84 63	3 77 54	2.7 65 42	3.1 49 31	2.4 36 20
- █ Average max. and min. temperatures in °F
- █ Precipitation totals in inches
- Source: The Weather Channel
Metric conversion
J	F	M	A	M	J	J	A	S	O	N	D
44 −1 −10	43 3 −8	73 9 −2	97 16 4	115 23 11	99 28 16	100 30 18	97 29 17	75 25 12	69 18 6	78 9 −1	61 2 −7
- █ Average max. and min. temperatures in °C
- █ Precipitation totals in mm

In recent years, average temperatures in Bloomington have ranged from a low of 14 °F (−10 °C) in January to a high of 86 °F (30 °C) in July, although a record low of −23 °F (−31 °C) was recorded in January 1985 and a record high of 114 °F (46 °C) was recorded on July 15, 1936, during the 1936 North American heat wave. Average monthly precipitation ranged from 1.71 inches (43 mm) in February to 4.52 inches (115 mm) in May.

== Demographics ==
Historical population
Census	Pop.	Note	%±
1850	1,594		—
1860	7,075		343.9%
1870	14,590		106.2%
1880	17,180		17.8%
1890	20,484		19.2%
1900	23,286		13.7%
1910	25,768		10.7%
1920	28,725		11.5%
1930	30,930		7.7%
1940	32,868		6.3%
1950	34,163		3.9%
1960	36,274		6.2%
1970	39,992		10.2%
1980	44,189		10.5%
1990	51,976		17.6%
2000	64,808		24.7%
2010	76,610		18.2%
2020	78,680		2.7%
U.S. Decennial Census; 2018 Estimate

=== Racial and ethnic composition ===
Bloomington city, Illinois – racial and ethnic composition Note: the US Census treats Hispanic/Latino as an ethnic category. This table excludes Latinos from the racial categories and assigns them to a separate category. Hispanics/Latinos may be of any race.
Race / ethnicity (NH = Non-Hispanic)	Pop 2000	Pop 2010	Pop 2020	% 2000	% 2010	% 2020
White alone (NH)	54,011	57,141	54,590	83.34%	74.59%	69.38%
Black or African American alone (NH)	5,527	7,663	8,407	8.53%	10.00%	10.69%
Native American or Alaska Native alone (NH)	107	170	165	0.17%	0.22%	0.21%
Asian alone (NH)	1,949	5,315	5,622	3.01%	6.94%	7.15%
Native Hawaiian or Pacific Islander alone (NH)	24	23	26	0.04%	0.03%	0.03%
Other race alone (NH)	86	106	294	0.13%	0.14%	0.37%
Mixed-race or multiracial (NH)	954	1,884	3,637	1.47%	2.46%	4.62%
Hispanic or Latino (any race)	2,150	4,308	5,939	3.32%	5.62%	7.55%
Total	64,808	76,610	78,680	100.00%	100.00%	100.00%

=== 2020 census ===
As of the 2020 census, Bloomington had a population of 78,680. The median age was 36.9 years. 22.5% of residents were under the age of 18 and 14.3% of residents were 65 years of age or older. For every 100 females there were 95.0 males, and for every 100 females age 18 and over there were 92.6 males age 18 and over.

99.9% of residents lived in urban areas, while 0.1% lived in rural areas.

There were 33,545 households in Bloomington, of which 28.3% had children under the age of 18 living in them. Of all households, 42.9% were married-couple households, 20.7% were households with a male householder and no spouse or partner present, and 29.3% were households with a female householder and no spouse or partner present. About 34.7% of all households were made up of individuals and 11.1% had someone living alone who was 65 years of age or older.

There were 36,289 housing units, of which 7.6% were vacant. The homeowner vacancy rate was 1.7% and the rental vacancy rate was 9.7%.

Racial composition as of the 2020 census
Race	Number	Percent
White	56,039	71.2%
Black or African American	8,579	10.9%
American Indian and Alaska Native	305	0.4%
Asian	5,636	7.2%
Native Hawaiian and Other Pacific Islander	39	0.0%
Some other race	2,633	3.3%
Two or more races	5,449	6.9%

=== 2010 census ===
As of the 2010 census, there were 76,610 people and 30,454 households within the city. The population density was 2,814.8 inhabitants per square mile (1,086.8/km^{2}). There were 34,339 housing units at an average density of 1,261.5 per square mile (487.1/km^{2}). The racial makeup of the city was 77.5% White, 10.1% African American, 0.3% Native American, 7.0% Asian, 1.42% from other races, and 2.9% from two or more races. Hispanic or Latino people of any race were 5.6% of the population.

In 2010, there were 34,339 households, out of which 28.8% had children under the age of 18 living with them, 46.7% were married couples living together, 9.1% had a female householder with no husband present, and 41.1% were non-families. 32.6% of all households were made up of individuals, and 9.2% had someone living alone who was 65 years of age or older. The average household size was 2.41 and the average family size was 3.12.

In the city, the population was spread out, with 27.3% under the age of 20, 9.0% from 18 to 24, 29.8% from 25 to 45, 23.8% from 45 to 64, and 10.2% who were 65 years of age or older. The median age was 33 years. For every 100 females, there were 95.4 males.

The median income for a household in the city was $58,662, and the median income for a family was $81,166. Males had a median income of $56,597 versus $39,190 for females. The per capita income for the city was $32,672. About 5.7% of families and 11.0% of the population were below the poverty line, including 12.6% of those under age 18 and 6.3% of those age 65 or over.

=== Population growth ===
The City of Bloomington and McLean County comprise the fastest-growing metropolitan area in Illinois. The area's population has grown 28% from 1990 through 2006. The fastest growth has been in Bloomington, as the U.S. Census Bureau conducted a special census of that city in February 2006, showing a population of 74,975, a 15.7% increase in less than six years.

== Economy ==
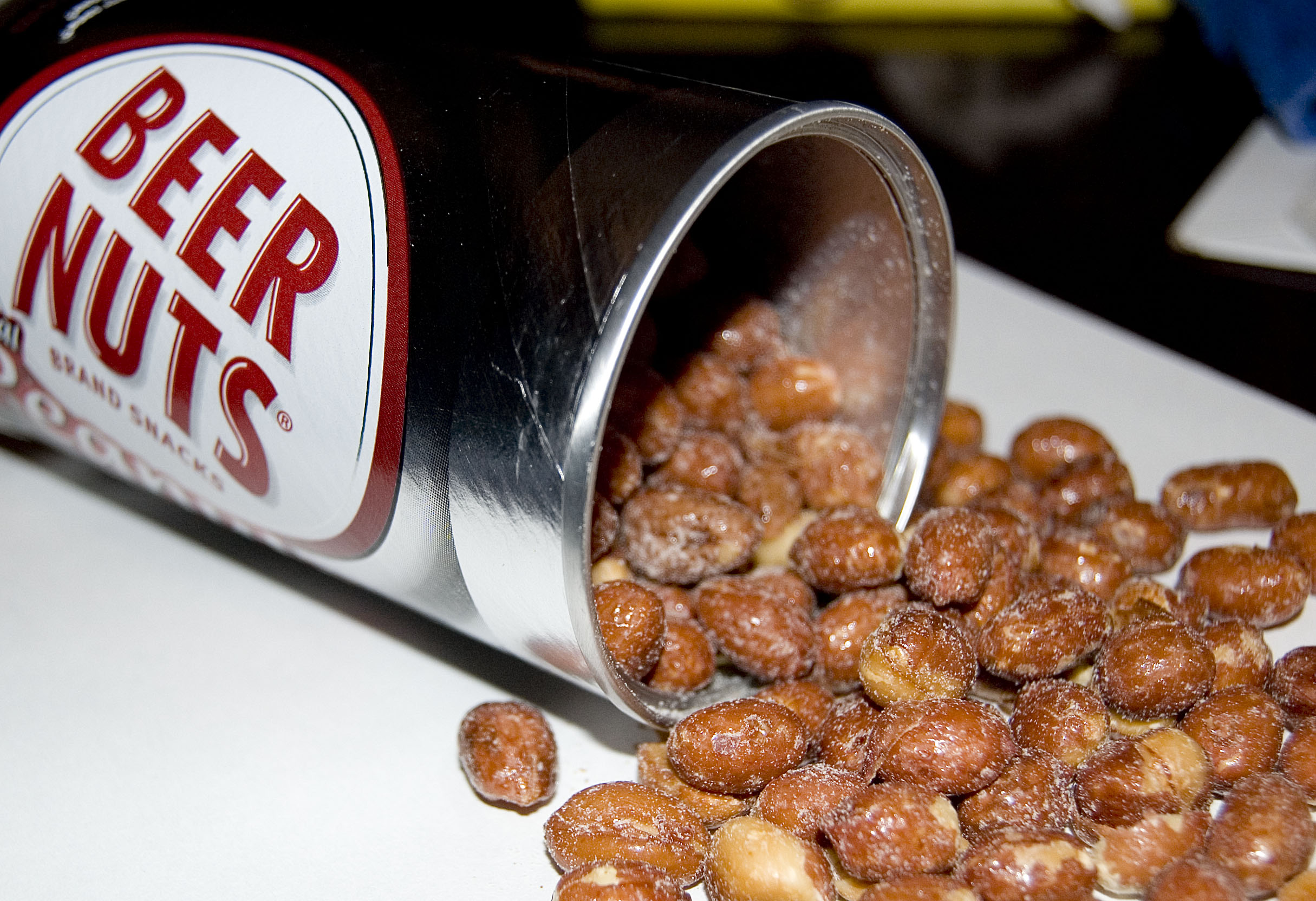
Beer Nuts are produced in Bloomington.

Bloomington is home to State Farm Insurance, Country Financial, Illinois Agricultural Association, and Beer Nuts. The original Steak 'n Shake restaurant was opened in Normal, Bloomington's adjoining city, in 1934. Bloomington also has the largest Dairy Queen restaurant in the United States.

=== Top employers ===
According to Bloomington's 2018 Comprehensive Annual Financial Report, the area's top employers are:

#	Employer	Employees
1	State Farm Insurance	14,731
2	Illinois State University	3,281
3	Country Financial	1,972
4	McLean County Unit District No. 5	1,761
5	Carle Bromenn Medical Center	1,305
6	OSF St. Joseph Medical Center	860
7	McLean County	835
8	Afni	830
9	Bloomington School District 87	703
10	City of Bloomington	679

Bloomington is also home to a convention center at the McLean County Fairgrounds and Grossinger Motors Arena.

Bloomington is the only town where Beer Nuts brand snacks are made. There are two Beer Nuts company stores in Bloomington, each offering a video tour of the plant and history of Beer Nuts.

=== Retail ===
Eastland Mall is the main shopping center in Bloomington.

== Arts and culture ==
Bloomington-Normal ranks competitively in Richard Florida's creativity rankings. Most noteworthy is Bloomington-Normal's creative class share of the workforce, which resulted in a No. 1 rating for Bloomington-Normal's creativity rank.

The Bloomington Center for the Performing Arts is the centerpiece of the city's Cultural District, which also includes the neighboring McLean County of Arts Center, forthcoming festival park, and creativity center for arts education. The center is also home to over twenty area performing arts ensembles. More than 400 performances and community events take place at the Bloomington Center for the Performing Arts each year. The Illinois Symphony Orchestra performs at the Bloomington Center for the Performing Arts, where it gives five Masterworks concerts, two Pops concerts, and three Chamber Orchestra concerts annually.

The McLean County Arts Center is one of the oldest arts organizations in the Midwest, serving Central Illinois for over 130 years. Each year 12 art exhibitions are held, including the Holiday Treasurers exposition and sale, and the annual Amateur Competition and Exhibition which, for over 70 years, has showcased the best amateur artists in Central Illinois. The Arts Center also sponsors a number of community events, such as the Sugar Creek Arts Festival in Uptown Normal and the Spring Bloom Arts Festival in Bloomington.

The Community Players Theater, on Robinhood Lane off of Towanda Avenue, is one of the oldest community theaters completely staffed by volunteers. Opened in 1923, it celebrated its 88th season in 2011. The Castle Theatre first opened in 1916 as a 1,000-seat theater, created by the legendary theater builders Balaban & Katz, original inventors of the classic movie palace. For decades, the property served as one of the area's premier destinations. The Castle was restored to its former glory with a $1.5 million renovation. It presents live music, corporate, public and private events. The Illinois Wesleyan University School of Theatre Arts houses its talent within the Jerome Mirza Theatre at McPherson Hall. Four main stage plays are performed here annually, selected from a playbill including everything from Shakespeare to musicals. McPherson Hall, completed in 1963, is named for IWU's 10th president, Harry W. McPherson, and contains a 300-seat theater, scene shop, classrooms and other facilities. The Illinois Wesleyan University Westbrook Auditorium serves approximately 200 music majors and several hundred IWU students each year. Several musical performances of all style periods are featured each semester, and most concerts are free with general seating.

The Miller Park Outdoor Summer Theatre, an amateur theater group sponsored by the City of Bloomington, performs two major theater productions each year. USA Ballet is an international ballet company. It provides children's workshops and outreach programs, and presents at Illinois Wesleyan University's McPherson Theatre three times a year.

=== Events ===
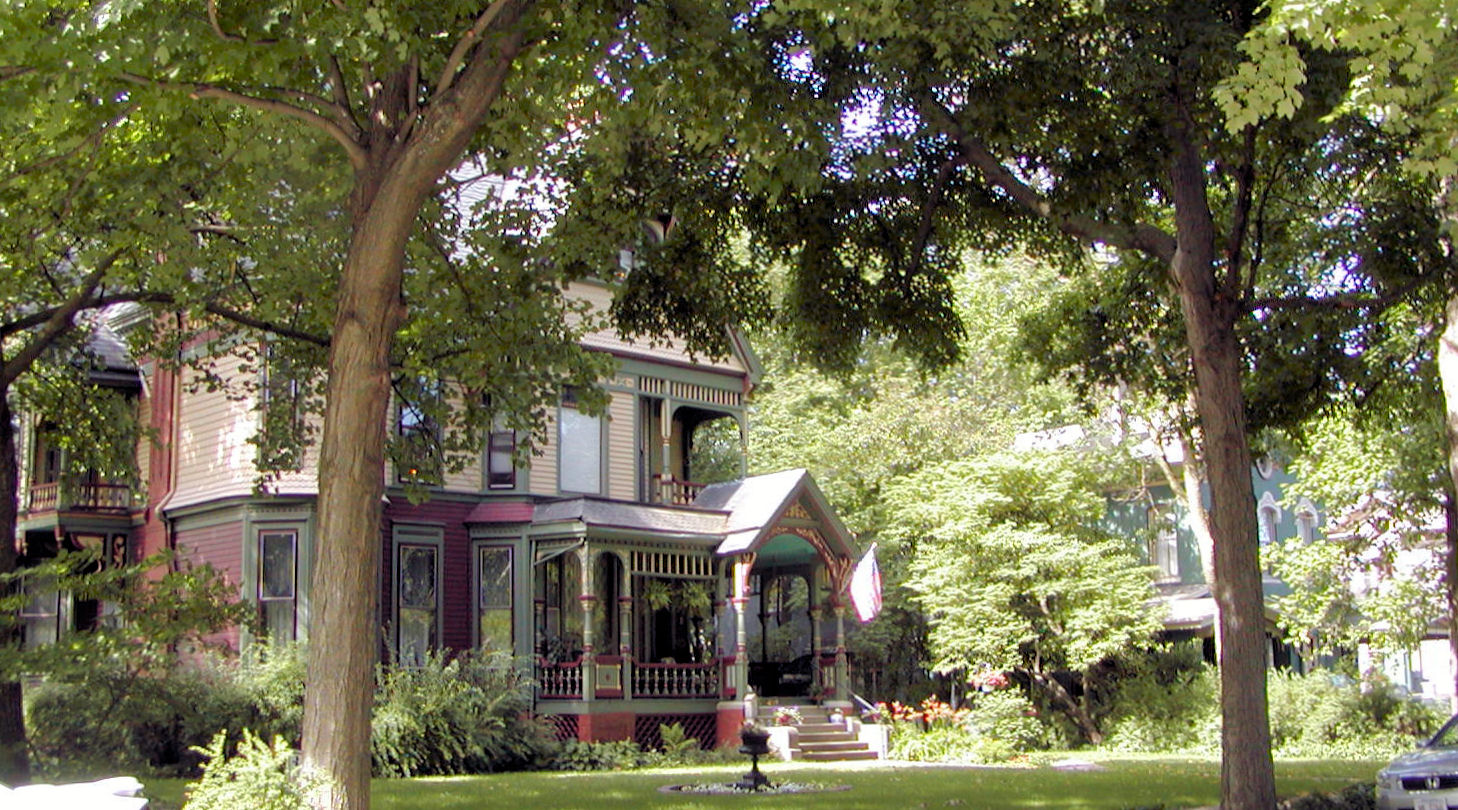
East Grove Street District

American Passion Play was the oldest continuously performed Passion Play in the United States. Performed each spring at the Bloomington Center for the Performing Arts, the Passion Play was set in Palestine and portrays the life of Christ in its entirety, closing finally after its 100th year running in May 2023.

The Illinois Shakespeare Festival includes productions performed in an open-air, Elizabethan-style theatre within historic Ewing Manor each summer. The audience is encouraged to picnic on the grounds before each performance to be entertained by strolling Madrigal singers, jesters, and other entertainers as well as a Green Show performance.

The Lincoln's Bloomington Festival is held each July in Downtown Bloomington and features Civil War reenactments, traditional craft demonstrations, children's activities, musical performances, talks and tours.

The Spring Bloom Arts Festival is hosted by the McLean County Arts Center in March each year. This indoor fine art festival features over 100 artists representing a wide range of media including woodworking, glass art, sculpture, paintings, prints, photographs and handcrafted jewelry.

The McLean County Fair is billed as the '"Home of the World's Largest County 4-H Fair" taking place each August at the McLean County Fairgrounds in Bloomington. 4-H activities include: livestock shows, a film festival, and exhibits around food, nutrition and health, plant science, engineering and technology, and environment and natural resources. Evening Grandstand Entertainment features tractor pulls and various musical acts.

=== Historic sites ===
Ewing Manor was designed by Bloomington architect Phil Hooten in the Channel-Norman style favored by the affluent in the post-Victorian period. The surrounding gardens were created by noted landscape architect Jens Jensen, who also designed Springfield's Lincoln Memorial Gardens. The theatre on the grounds play host to the Illinois Shakespeare Festival each summer.

The McLean County Museum of History traces its roots back to 1892, the year the McLean County Historical Society was founded. Housed inside the old McLean County Courthouse, the museum features permanent and rotating exhibits that explore the history of Central Illinois. This location is listed on the National Register of Historic Places.

The Miller Park Pavilion & War Memorial was restored in 1977 and dedicated in May 1988. The black granite memorial is surrounded by red sidewalks that list the names of Central Illinois residents killed or missing in action in the Korean and Vietnam battles.

The Prairie Aviation Museum has a collection of preserved aircraft on display, including a Bell Sea Cobra, Huey helicopter, and F-14 Tomcat.

The Evergreen Memorial Cemetery, also known as the Evergreen Cemetery is the burial site of many notable Bloomington-Normal citizens including members of the Stevenson family. Adlai E. Stevenson I, vice president to Grover Cleveland, and Adlai E. Stevenson II, governor of Illinois, ambassador to the United Nations, and twice Democratic candidate for the United States presidency, are buried there. Also buried there are Stevenson's wife, Letitia Green Stevenson, who was the second national president-general of the Daughters of the American Revolution, and her sister, Julia Green Scott, the seventh national president-general of the Daughters of the American Revolution. Other historical figures buried there include David Davis, friend and mentor to Abraham Lincoln; Charles Radbourn, arguably 19th-century baseball's greatest pitcher; and Dorothy Gage, inspiration for the main character in the Wizard of Oz and niece of author L. Frank Baum.

The David Davis Mansion offers a glimpse into the life friend and mentor of Abraham Lincoln, David Davis, who was a U.S. senator from Illinois and associate justice of the United States Supreme Court. Davis was a key component during Lincoln's bid for the 1860 presidential nomination. The Davis Mansion, completed in 1872, combines Italianate and Second Empire architectural features and is a model of mid-Victorian style and taste. His Bloomington home, which remained in the Davis family for three succeeding generations, contains the most modern conveniences of that era: a coal-burning stove, gas lighting and indoor plumbing. The David Davis Mansion is an historic landmark on the National Register of Historic Places.

The former building of the Montefiore synagogue is one of the few Moorish Revival buildings in Illinois and one of the oldest synagogues in the United States. Other historical landmarks listed on the National Register of Historic Places are:

- Rubin Benjamin House
- George H. Cox House
- David Davis III House
- Robert Greenlee House
- John M. Hamilton House
- Holy Trinity Rectory
- McLean County Courthouse
- George H. Miller House
- Miller-Davis Law Building
- Stevenson House
- White Building
- Vrooman Mansion

== Parks and recreation ==
The Bloomington Parks & Recreation Department is composed of four divisions: Parks, Recreation, Golf, and the Miller Park Zoo. The department maintains over 1,100 acres (4.5 km^{2}) of land including 44 park sites and three golf courses. These facilities often contain water spray parks, elaborate playgrounds, miniature golf, baseball/softball diamonds, soccer fields, cricket grounds, and lighted tennis courts. Outdoor public swimming pools are at O'Neil Park and Holiday Park.

Miller Park Zoo offers many exhibits and zookeeper interaction opportunities. Zoo inhabitants include a Sumatran tiger, river otter, Galapagos tortoise, Amur leopard, sun bears, reindeer, sea lion, red pandas, lemus, bald eagles, pallas cats and red wolves. The zoo features many exhibits including Wallaby WalkAbout, ZooLab, Children's Zoo, Animals of Asia, and the Katthoefer Animal Building. The Zoo's newest exhibit is the Tropical America Rainforest.

The Bloomington-Normal Constitution Trail is a 24-mile (39 km) trail that operates on dedicated right-of-way through much of the city. The north–south segment of the trail follows the abandoned Illinois Central Gulf railroad from Kerrick Road in Normal to Grove Street in Bloomington. The east–west segment intersects the north segment at Normal City Hall Annex and continues east to Towanda-Barnes Road. The Liberty Branch begins at Commerce Drive and ends at Old Farm Lakes Subdivision. The Freedom Branch begins at Lincoln Street and ends at Route 9 West. The trail is open to walkers, runners, in-line skaters, skateboarders, cyclists, wheelchair users, and other non-motorized forms of transportation. During winter months, it is not cleared of snow, and is available to skiers; weather permitting.

The Genevieve Green Gardens at Ewing Cultural Center were dedicated in 2007 as part of the Illinois State University's 150th anniversary celebration. Several architects and landscape designers contributed to the extensive project of creating the gardens, including input from Bruce V. Green, an avid gardener whose $5.2 million donation spearheaded the project. The gardens include a public entry that directs visitors to a formal plaza, the entrance to the manor, a grass patio, theater walk with a widened walkway, and additional plantings.

The Bloomington Ice Center is an indoor public ice skating facility operated by the Bloomington Parks & Recreation Department. The facility offers ice skating lessons, public skating sessions, a comprehensive hockey program, learn to curl and curling leagues, skate rental, and a concessions stand.

== Sports ==
=== Hockey ===
Bloomington has been home to multiple minor league and semiprofessional hockey teams throughout the years. The first being the Bloomington PrairieThunder from 2006 to 2011. Bloomington was then home to the Bloomington Blaze and Bloomington Thunder (SPHL) from 2011 to 2014. Then from 2014 to 2019 Bloomington was the home of the Central Illinois Flying Aces who played in the United States Hockey League. Starting in 2024 Bloomington became the home of the Bloomington Bison who play in the ECHL and are the affiliate of the Winnipeg Jets of the NHL.

=== Golf ===
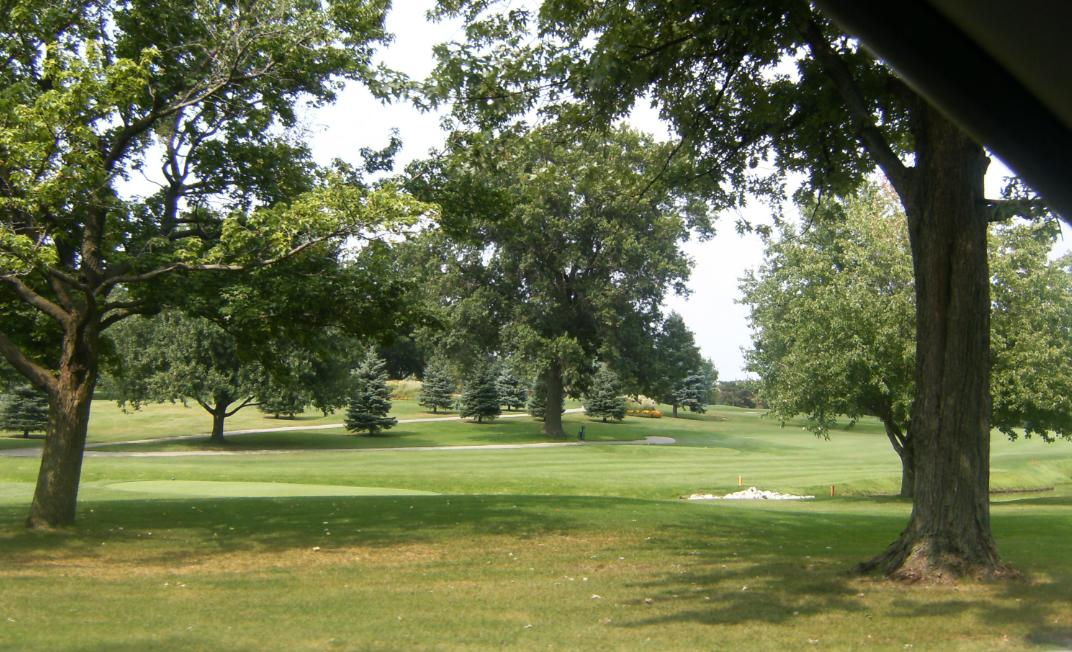
The golf course at the Bloomington Country Club

In 2005, Golf Digest ranked Bloomington-Normal as the Fifth Best American City for Golf in its "Best in America" Metro Golf Rankings. Golf Digest ranked America's largest Metropolitan Statistical Areas on four different criteria: access to golf, weather, value of golf, and quality of golf.

- The Den at Fox Creek: 6,926 yards (6,333 m), par 72, 18 holes

The Den at Fox Creek is a 4-star, Arnold Palmer Signature Designed Golf Course that opened in 1997. Amenities include GPS-equipped carts, club rental, pro shop and snack bar. There are nine holes with water hazards, 131 sand traps and a unique alternative shot closing the 18th hole on this par 72 course. Practice facilities include a large bent grass driving range and tees with practice chipping and putting greens. The Den is home to both the IHSA Boys' Golf State Tournament and State Farm Youth Classic each summer.

- Highland Park Golf Course: 5,725 yards (5,235 m), par 70, 18 holes

Located in South Bloomington, the Highland Park Golf Course has numerous challenges including creeks, three lakes, well-placed sand traps and tree-lined fairways. Highland Park sports a pro shop, carts, club rental and snack bar and offers individual or group lessons. The Highland Park Golf Course hosts the State Farm Youth Classic each summer.

- The Links at Ireland Grove: 1,590 yards (1,450 m), par 29, 9 holes

The Links at Ireland Grove is Bloomington's newest public golf facility and first executive course. This nine-hole course consists of seven par 3's and two par 4's. The driving range has weather protected hitting bays, plus over 1-acre (4,000 m^{2}) of target greens, several bunkers, and nearly 2 acres (8,100 m^{2}) of natural grass hitting area. In addition, The Links Golf Academy offers a 4-acre (16,000 m^{2}) short game practice facility. The Links' complex also includes Golf Etc., a pro shop selling everything golf related. The Links is also home to the skills Challenge portion of the State Farm Youth Classic each summer.

- Prairie Vista Golf Course: 6,745 yards (6,168 m), par 72, 18 holes

Prairie Vista sports 16 water hazards, a wave bunker, two-level greens and fairways, much sand, a pro shop, carts, club rental, snack bar, banquet room and driving range. In addition to annually hosting the State Farm Youth Classic and IHSA Boys' Golf State Finals, Prairie Vista hosted the 1997 NCAA Division I Women's Golf East Regional.

There are two private country clubs within Bloomington: Bloomington Country Club and Lakeside Country Club. A third, Crestwicke Country Club, is just south of the city. All three have golf courses.

=== Facilities ===
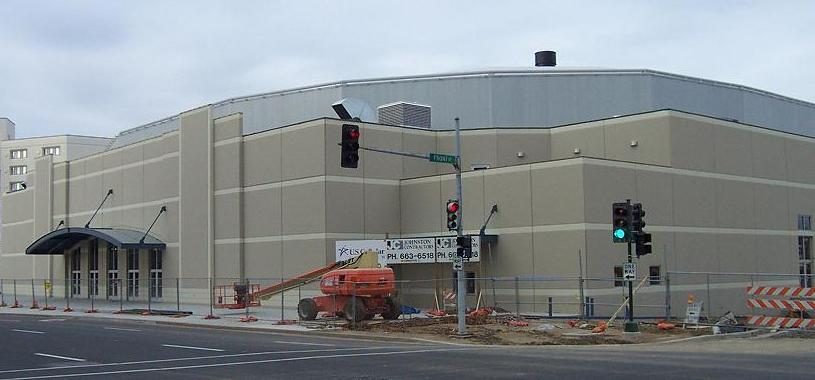
Grossinger Motors Arena

The Grossinger Motors Arena in southwest downtown Bloomington opened in 2006 and is home to the Bloomington Edge of the Indoor Football League and formerly the home of the PrairieThunder and Blaze of the Central Hockey League. Since 2014, it has been the home rink of the Central Illinois Flying Aces of the United States Hockey League, as well as hosting certain games of Illinois State University's club hockey team and local youth hockey programs. With over 180,000 square feet (17,000 m^{2}) of space, the arena boasts a fixed seating capacity of 7,000 but can seat over 8,000 for special events. The facility can also be set up as a theatre with a retractable curtain and enables shows to seat 2,500–5,000 in a more intimate atmosphere. Since the arena's opening, the facility has hosted an array of events including concerts, family shows, ice shows, motorsports, and trade shows.

The Community Soccer Fields complex offers 20 soccer fields of various sizes used annually by 2,000 area soccer players.

Extra Innings Bloomington/Normal is an indoor baseball and softball training facility. The Shira Baseball Complex consists of 6 fields of various sizes (four with lights) and a concession stand to accommodate McLean County baseball players ages 5–19.

=== Teams ===
Team	League	Sport	Venue	Established	Championships
Normal CornBelters	Prospect League	Baseball	The Corn Crib	2009	None
FC Diablos	Midwest Premier League	Association football	The Corn Crib	2017	0
Bloomington Bison	ECHL	Ice hockey	Grossinger Motors Arena	2024	-

== Education ==
=== Primary and secondary ===
Bloomington is served by two public school districts. The interior of the city is served by Bloomington Public Schools District 87, which operates one high school, Bloomington High School, one junior high school, Bloomington Junior High School, and six elementary schools (Oakland, Washington, Bent, Irving, Sheridan, and Stevenson elementary schools) and one pre-school, Sarah Raymond (named for the first female superintendent for Bloomington).

Growth has taken the city well into the boundaries of a second district, McLean County Unit District No. 5. Although Unit Five originally served only suburban areas, including Normal, the majority of its students now are from Bloomington itself. Unit Five operates two high schools (Normal Community High School and Normal Community West High School), four junior high schools, and numerous elementary schools. As of 2010, Unit Five was constructing its fourth junior high school which is called George Evans Junior High School more commonly known as EJHS. The construction was finished in 2011 Unit 5 was also making two new elementary schools in Bloomington, and is projecting the need for another high school.

Small portions extend into Olympia Community Unit School District 16.

Bloomington is also home to several private schools, including Central Catholic High School, Corpus Christi Catholic School Elm./Jr. School, Epiphany Elm./Jr. School, St. Mary's Catholic School, Trinity Lutheran School, and Cornerstone Christian Academy. Bloomington students also may enroll at Metcalf Elm./Jr. School and University High School, laboratory schools located at Illinois State University.

Bloomington/Normal Japanese Saturday School (ブルーミントン・ノーマル補習授業校 Burūminton Nōmaru Hoshū Jugyō Kō), a Japanese weekend school, was established in 1986 and held at the Thomas Metcalf School, an ISU laboratory school in Normal. The school has a separate office in Normal.

=== Colleges and universities ===
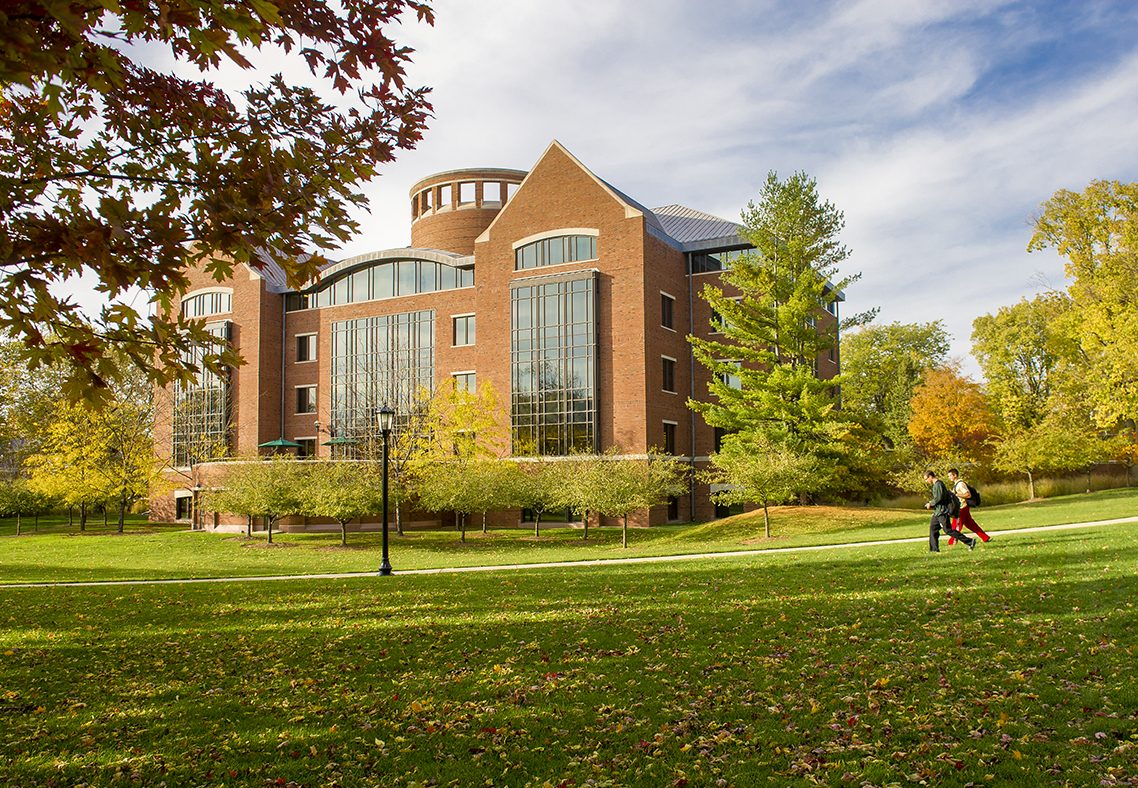
Illinois Wesleyan University

The city of Bloomington is home to Illinois Wesleyan University. Founded in 1850, it is a private residential university with an enrollment of 2,100 and a student/faculty ratio of 12 to 1. Historically, it was affiliated with the United Methodist Church. The university consists of the College of Liberal Arts, with 17 academic departments; the College of Fine Arts, comprising professional Schools of Art, Music, and Theatre Arts; and the School of Nursing. In the past decade, Illinois Wesleyan has added the five-story Ames Library, the Center for Natural Science, and the Shirk Center for Athletics and Recreation. An NCAA Division III school, Illinois Wesleyan has had more than 100 athletes elected into the Academic All-American team since 1970.

=== Library ===
Bloomington Public Library was first opened in 1857 by the Ladies' Library Association, which was formed in 1856. The small library was mainly supported by book donations and membership fees. In 1871, the library relocated to 105 West North Street (now West Monroe Street). After closing due to a lack of funds in 1880, the library reopened after residents raised $1,100 to support it. In 1888, the library moved into a new two-story building at the corner of East and Washington Streets on land donated by Sarah B. Withers. In honor of the donation, the library was renamed "Withers Library." In 1976, Citizens for a New Public Library organized a Friends of the Library group that campaigned for approval of bonds to raise money for a new public library. The campaign was successful, and in 1977 the library reopened at 205 East Olive Street as Bloomington Public Library. It offers a number of public programs, including a Bookmobile, started in 1926 as Library on Wheels, that delivers to local neighborhoods.

== Media ==
NOAA Weather Radio station KZZ65 transmits from Bloomington and is licensed to NOAA's National Weather Service Central Illinois Weather Forecast Office at Lincoln, broadcasting on a frequency of 162.525 mHz (channel 6 on most newer weather radios, and most SAME weather radios). The station activates the SAME tone alarm feature and a 1050 Hz tone activating older radios (except for AMBER Alerts, using the SAME feature only) for hazardous weather and non-weather warnings and emergencies, along with selected weather watches, for the Illinois counties of McLean, Tazewell, and Woodford. Weather permitting, a tone alarm test of both the SAME and 1050 Hz tone features are conducted every Wednesday between 11 AM and noon.

The Pantagraph is a local daily newspaper serving Bloomington.

== Transportation ==
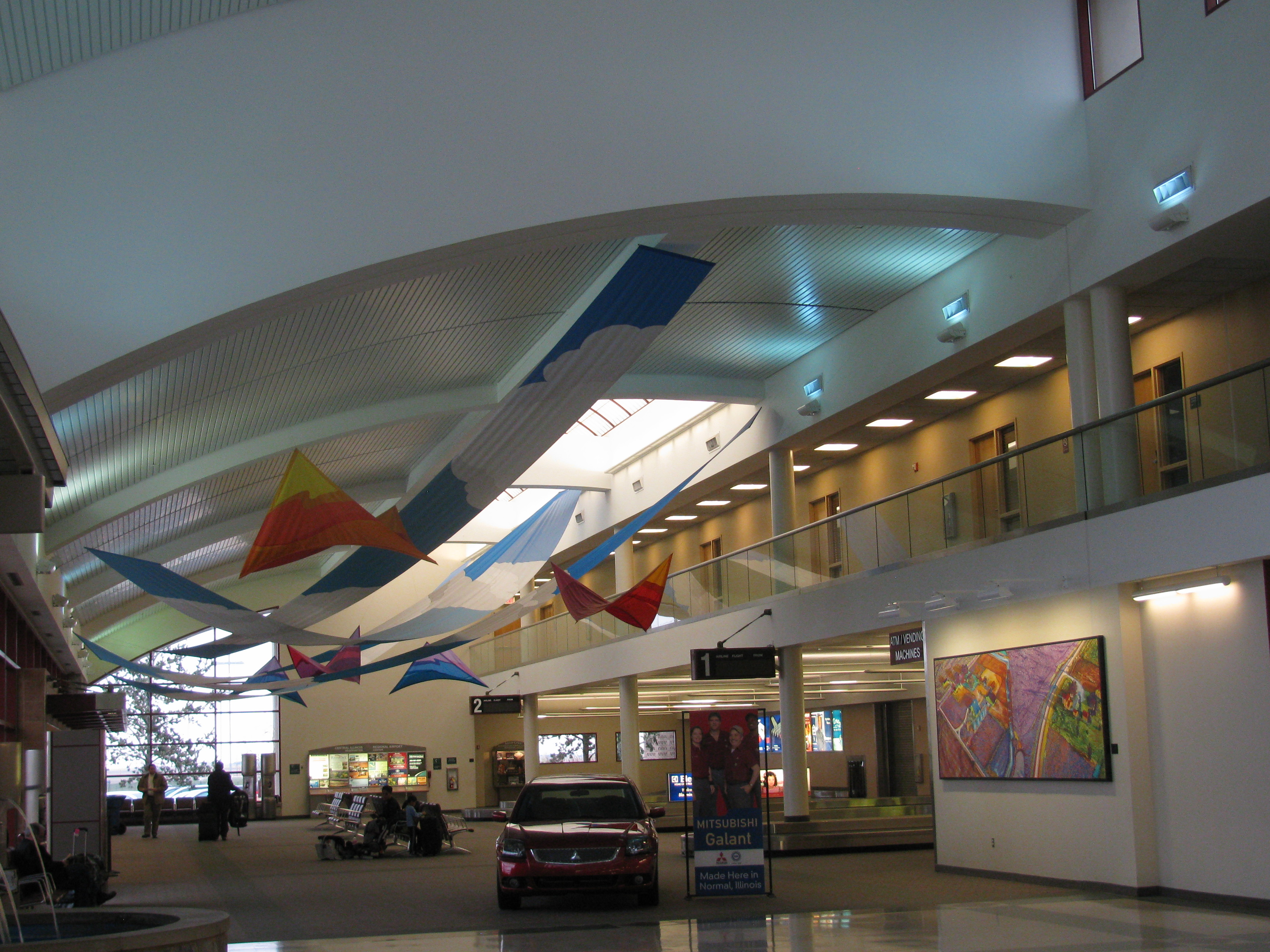
Terminal of Central Illinois Regional Airport

Bloomington is serviced by passenger rail, bus service, and several airlines. Amtrak, from Uptown Station in nearby Normal, operates five trains in each direction between St. Louis and Chicago each day. The station also serves connecting bus service to Peoria and Amtrak stations in Galesburg and Champaign-Urbana. It is Illinois' third-busiest Amtrak station after Chicago and Champaign-Urbana, servicing about 92,000 passengers in fiscal year 2021.

Greyhound Lines provides service to/from Chicago and St. Louis. Burlington Trailways offers service from the Amtrak station and the Greyhound station to/from Peoria, Quad Cities, Illinois/Iowa, Champaign, and Indianapolis

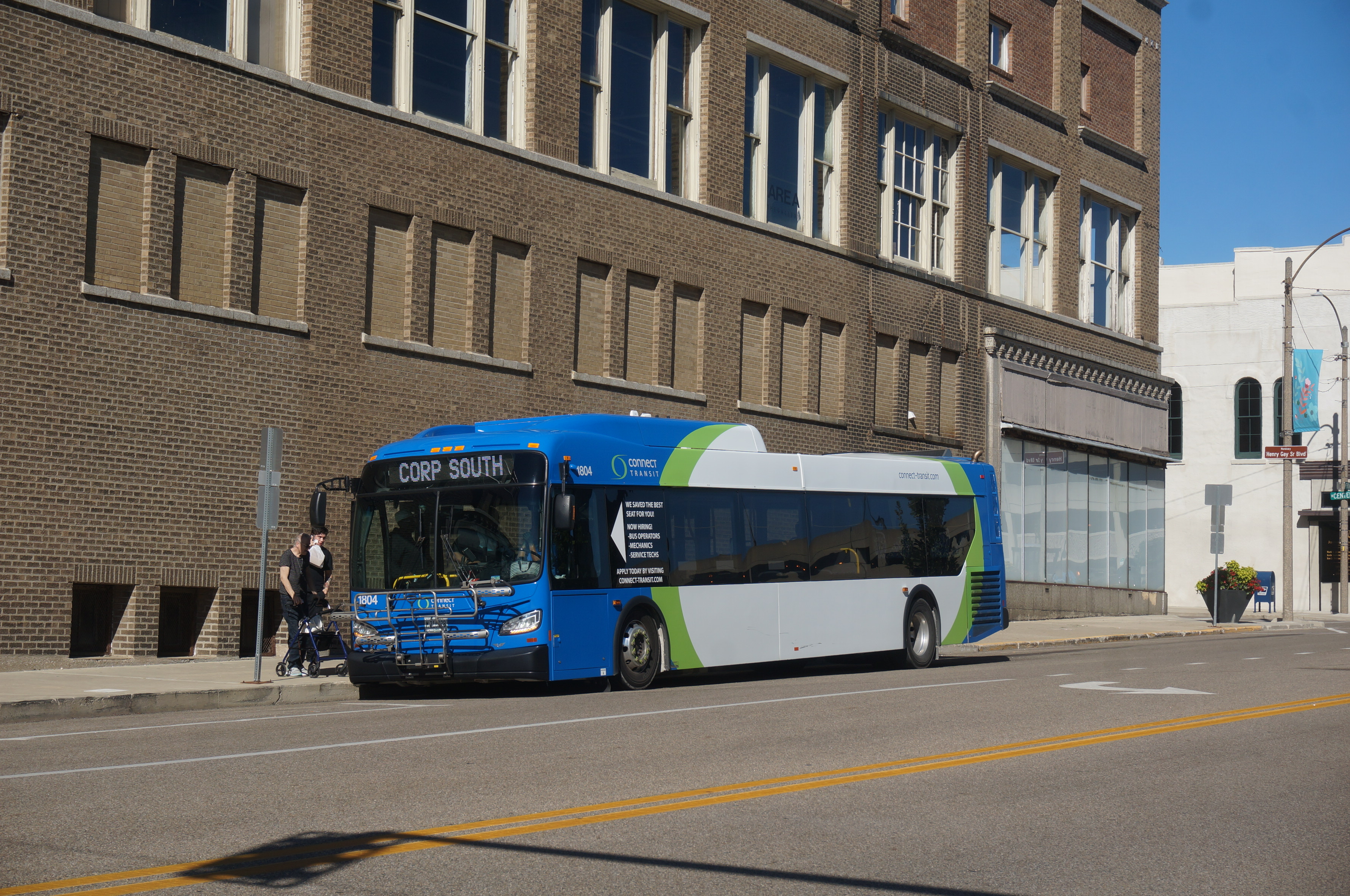
Connect Transit bus in downtown Bloomington

The Central Illinois Regional Airport on Route 9 is served by four airlines (Delta Air Lines, American Eagle, Frontier and Allegiant Air), five rental car agencies, and has direct daily flights to Atlanta (Delta), Chicago (American Eagle), Dallas-Ft. Worth (American Eagle), Detroit (Delta), and Minneapolis/St. Paul (Delta). Additional service includes nonstop flights to Sanford, Florida (Allegiant) and St.Pete/Clearwater (Allegiant). A record 559,481 passengers flew to or from CIRA in 2010.

Connect Transit provides local bus service with 13 color-coded fixed routes in the area; a lift-assisted paratransit service called Connect Mobility and a campus shuttle for ISU called Redbird Express.

Interstates 39, 55, and 74 intersect at Bloomington, making the city a substantial transportation hub. US Highways 51 and 150 and Illinois State Route 9 also run through Bloomington. The legendary US 66 once ran directly through the city's downtown and later on a bypass to the east.

== Sister cities ==
- Normal, Illinois
- Asahikawa, Hokkaido, Japan
- Caibarién, Cuba
- Canterbury, United Kingdom
- Vladimir, Russia

== See also ==
- 1917 Bloomington Streetcar Strike
- Bloomington, York Region, Ontario – believed to be named for Bloomington in 1869
