= Le Roy Commercial Historic District =

Historic district in Illinois, United States

- LeRoy Commercial Historic District
- U.S. National Register of Historic Places
- U.S. Historic district
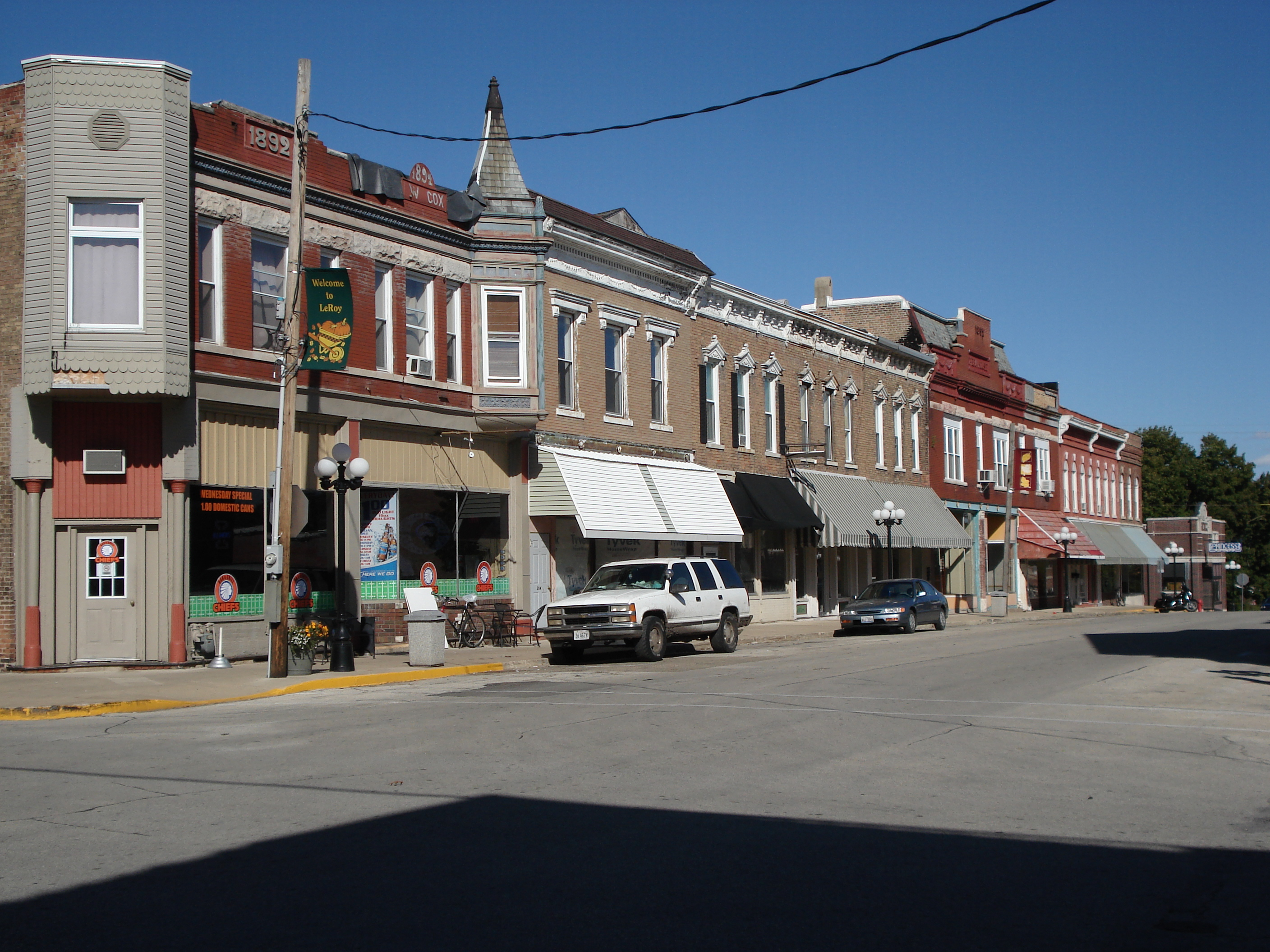

- Location within Illinois Location within the United States
- Location: 111-123, 200-223, 300 Center and 106-118 Chestnut Sts., LeRoy, Illinois
- Coordinates: 40°20′50″N 88°45′44″W
- Area: 6.4 acres (2.6 ha)
- NRHP reference No.: 96000089
- Added to NRHP: February 16, 1996

The Le Roy Commercial Historic District is a commercial historic district in downtown Le Roy, Illinois. The district includes 27 buildings, 25 of which are contributing buildings, on the 100 through 300 blocks of East Center Street and the 100 block of North Chestnut Street; it also includes the Town Park at the west end of East Center Street. The buildings in the district were constructed from 1870 to 1945, Le Roy's main period of commercial development. Many of the buildings were constructed after serious fires in 1892 and 1907. In addition to its many commercial buildings, the district also the Le Roy Town Hall, a brick building constructed in 1902. The Town Park was intended to be a town square and includes a band pavilion and a statue of Kickapoo chief Osaketa; however, as commercial development mainly spread east from the park, it never occupied a central location in Le Roy.

The district was added to the National Register of Historic Places on February 16, 1996.
