= Robert Greenlee House =

Historic house in Illinois, United States

- U.S. National Register of Historic Places
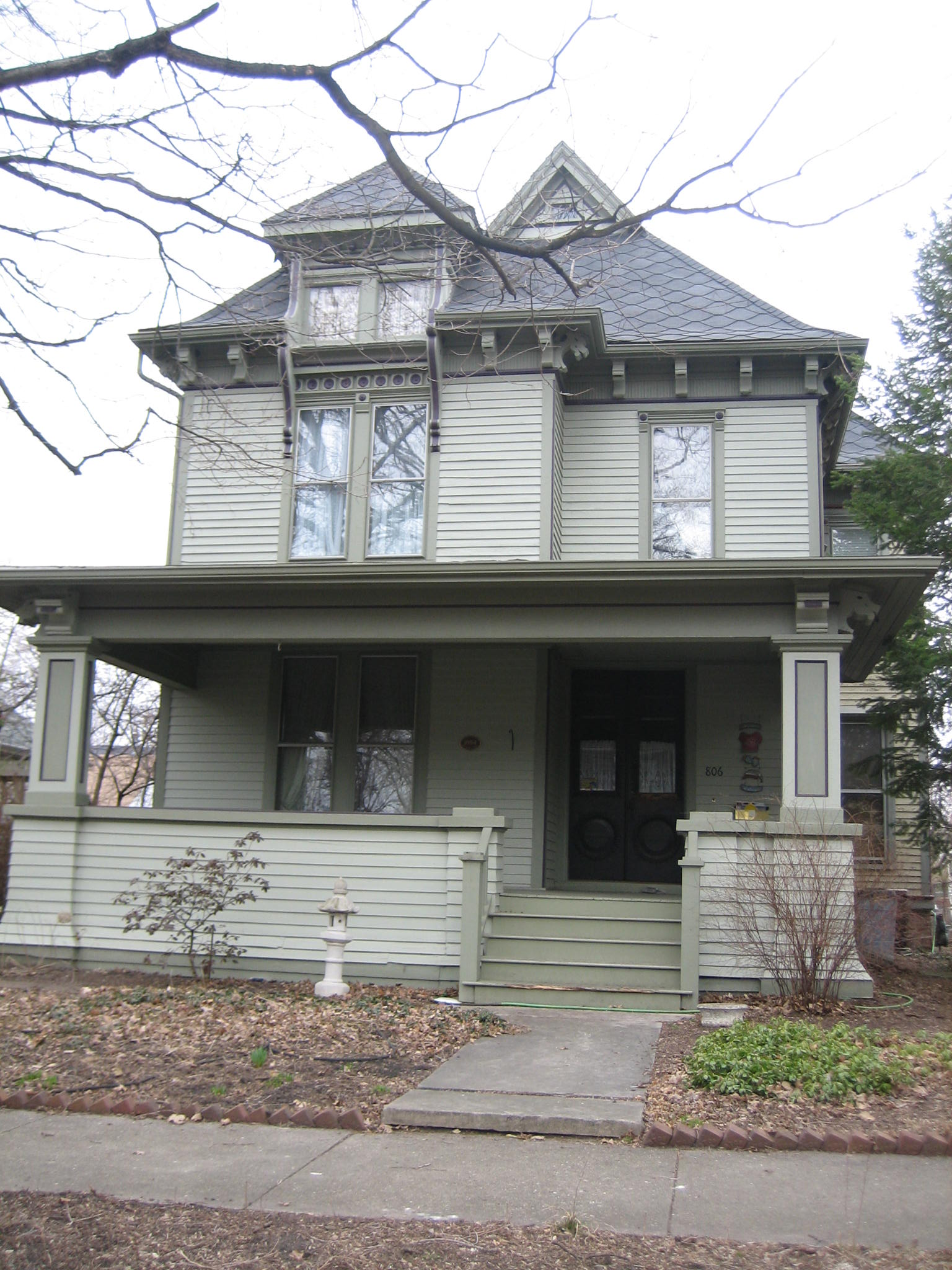

- Location within Illinois Location within the United States
- Location: 806 N. Evans St., Bloomington, Illinois
- Coordinates: 40°28′39″N 88°59′1″W
- Area: less than one acre
- Built: 1884
- Built by: Greenlee, Robert
- Architectural style: Eastlake, Queen Anne
- NRHP reference No.: 97000033
- Added to NRHP: February 7, 1997

The Robert Greenlee House is a historic house located at 806 N. Evans St. in Bloomington, Illinois. Contractor Robert Greenlee built the house circa 1884 for himself and his family. The house has a Queen Anne design topped by a hipped roof with cross gables. A dormer above the attic extends from a second-story front window; the dormer and window are decorated with Eastlake spindlework and bracketing. A tall stained glass window on the north facade features a central rose window and surrounding geometric panes, a pattern fitting both the Queen Anne and Eastlake styles. The cornice and front porch include dragon-shaped bracketing, a decorative element taken from Anglo-Japanese architecture; an Anglo-Japanese influence can also be seen in the roof's pagoda-style curvature.

The house was added to the National Register of Historic Places on February 7, 1997.
