= Miller Park Zoo =

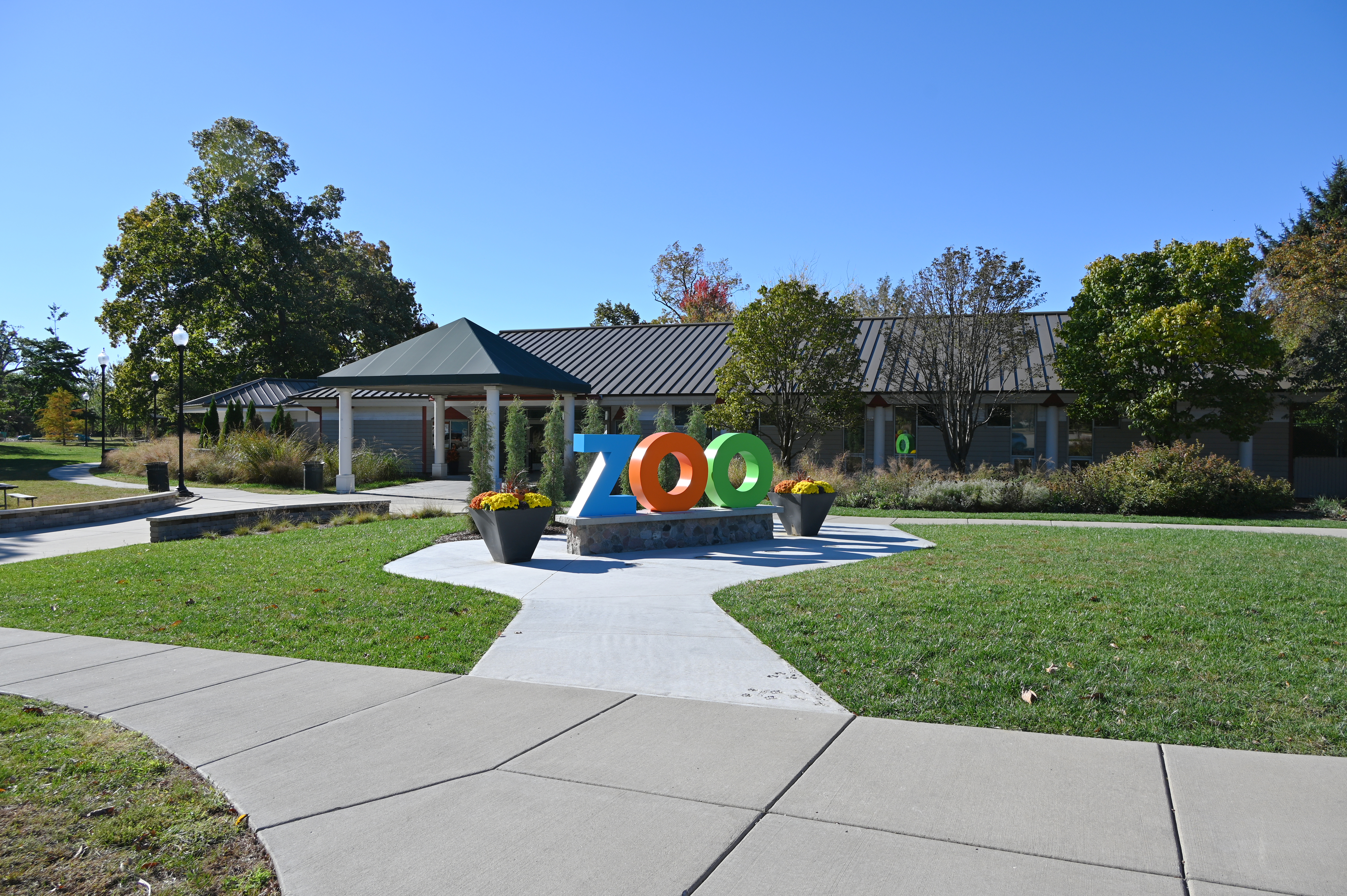
- Miller Park Zoo entrance, 2025
- Interactive map of Miller Park Zoo
- 40.4690°N 89.0055°W
- Location: Bloomington, Illinois
- Memberships: AZA
- Public transit: Connect Transit
- Website: mpzs.org

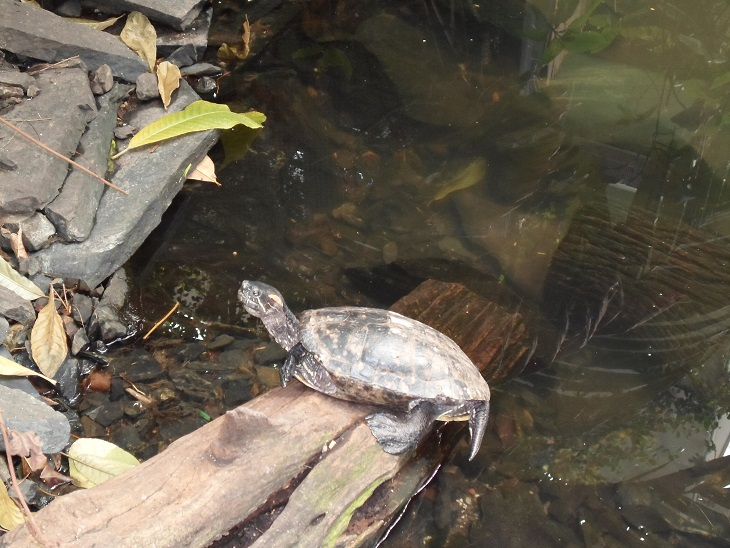
Turtle at Miller Park Zoo

Miller Park Zoo is a zoo located in Miller Park, a public park in Bloomington, Illinois, United States. It is administered by the Parks and Recreation Department of the City of Bloomington.

== History ==
The first city money was spent for the care of animals in Miller Park in 1891. Although there was at least one deer, there is no definite list of the animals that the first payment supported. The zoo is the 13th oldest in the USA.

The zoo was started when a circus lion cub ended up on James T. Miller's farm around 1900, and was eventually given to the city of Bloomington. The lion, later named "Big Jim", died on March 26, 1912. After Big Jim's death, funds were raised to construct the Animal House (later renamed the Katthoefer Animal Building) by Bloomington architect Arthur L. Pillsbury. Ground was broken in 1913, and the building was opened to the public in 1914.

The first real expansion of the zoo was in 1960 with the construction of the Woodland Wing, which at one time housed two sea lions. In the mid-1970s, the Woodland Wing became the Tropical Rainforest Exhibit, the Animal Building was updated, and the sea lion/otter pools were built.

The Entrance Building/Education Center was opened in 1992, the wolf exhibit in 1993, Wallaby Walkabout in 1994, the bald eagle exhibit in 1995, Animals of Asia in 1996, Zoolab in 1999, the Children's Zoo Complex in 2001, and the Tropical Rainforest Exhibit in 2004. These additions more than doubled the size of the zoo.

Over the years, the zoo has seen a wide variety of animals. There have been chimps, lions, a polar bear, moose, mountain lions, black bears, penguins, an elephant, bison, gray wolves, alligators, squirrel monkeys, spider monkeys, bats, foxes, North American porcupine, raccoons, and many other species.

On May 20, 2019, a flamingo was euthanized after a child threw a rock at it.

== Exhibits ==
Entryway – Greater flamingo

DeBrazza exhibit – De Brazza's monkey

Tropical America Rainforest – saki monkeys, scarlet ibis, troupial, Silver-beaked tanager, Violaceous Euphonia, Nicobar pigeon, saffron finches, cotton-top tamarins, prehensile-tailed porcupine, callimico monkeys, agouti, and more

Tortoise exhibit – Galapagos tortoise, Radiated tortoise, Asian forest tortoise

North America – bald eagle, red-tailed hawk, burrowing owl, ringtail, eastern box turtles

Wolf exhibit – red wolf

ZooLab – axolotl, walking sticks, giant cockroaches, budgerigar, green aracari, smoky jungle frog, mimic poison frog, and much more

Australia – tammar wallaby, wallaroo, laughing kookaburra, tawny frogmouth, salmon-crested cockatoo, and galah

Children's Zoo – San Clemente Island goat, chickens, mulefoot pig

Other exhibits – American alligator, Eurasian eagle owl, red panda, red ruffed lemur, Pallas's cat, hooded crane, guanaco, goose and koi pond

Katthoefer Animal Building – Reticulated python, Müller's gibbon, Francois' langur, Sumatran tiger, snow leopard (tiger feedings at 4:00 pm)

River otters – North American river otters (feedings at 11 am and 3:00 pm)

== Junior Zookeepers ==
The Junior Zoo Keeper program began in 1972, and at first was open to students starting in the second grade. Currently the Junior Zookeeper Program provides junior and senior high school students an opportunity to learn about animals and the ways that zoos work. The program starts with classroom training, and students can eventually become volunteers at the zoo. For advanced Junior Zookeepers, there are educational activities from October through April, and the students then volunteer over the summer. Students can start in the program once they enter fifth grade and can continue in the program through the summer after they graduate from high school.

== Future ==
There are currently plans to make major renovations on the Animal Building to bring it up to date, and also to redesign the ZooLab in order to create a new guest experience.
