= White Place Historic District (Illinois) =

Historic district in Illinois, United States

- U.S. National Register of Historic Places
- U.S. Historic district
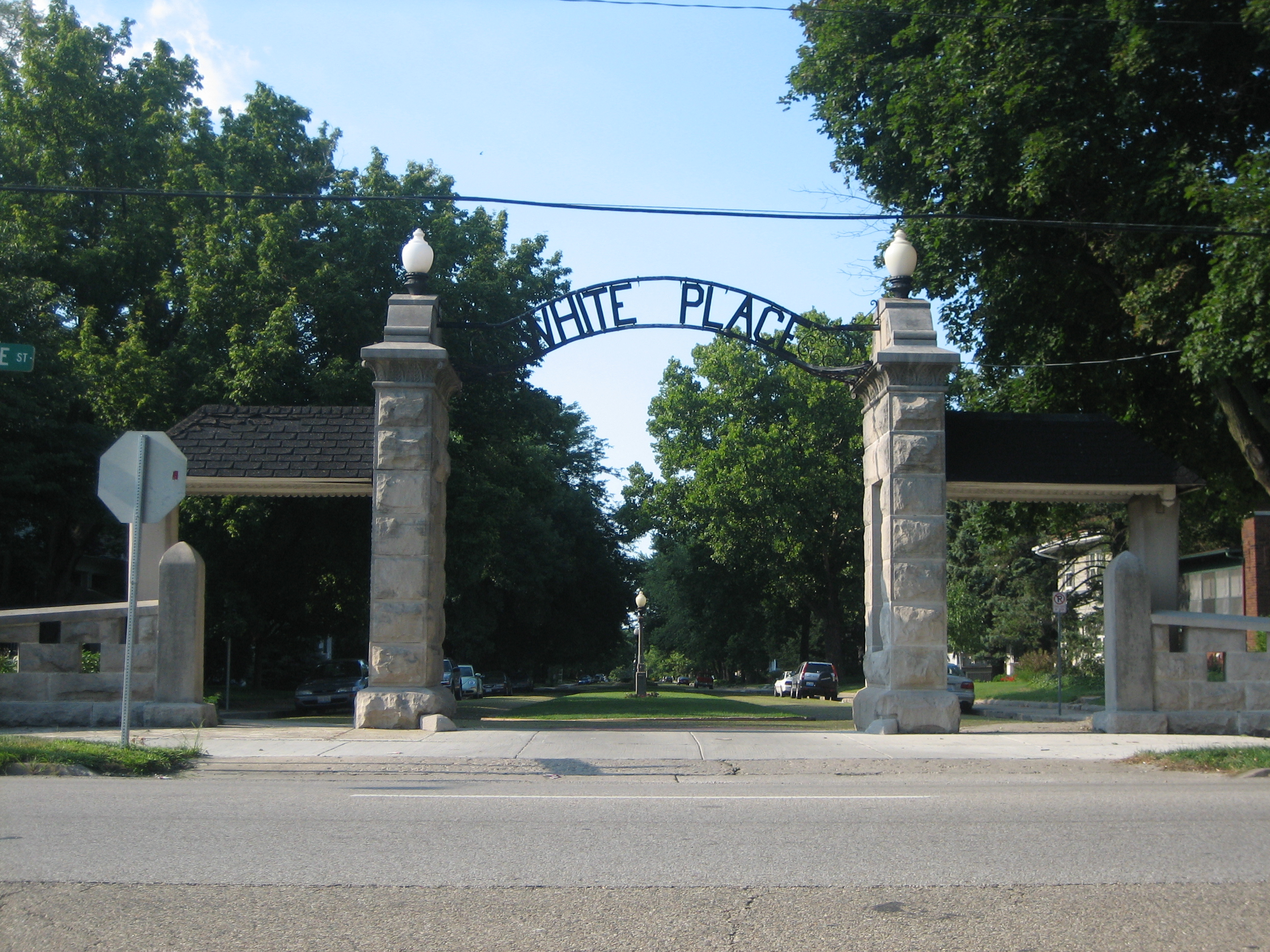
- Gate at South end of White Place

- Location within Illinois
- Location: White Pl., Clinton Blvd., and E side of Fell Ave. between Empire and Emerson Sts., Bloomington, Illinois
- Coordinates: 40°28′39″N 88°59′1″W
- Area: 38.8 acres (15.7 ha)
- Built: Various
- Architect: Pillsbury, A.L.; Et al.
- Architectural style: Late 19th And Early 20th Century American Movements, Late 19th And 20th Century Revivals, Late Victorian
- NRHP reference No.: 88001230
- Added to NRHP: August 12, 1988

The White Place Historic District is a residential historic district in Bloomington, Illinois. The district includes houses on White Place, North Clinton Boulevard, and the east side of Fell Avenue bordered to the south by Empire Street (U.S. Route 9) and Emerson Street to the north. These houses were largely built between 1895 and 1928, and many of them were built shortly after S. R. White platted White Place. The homes in the district were designed in a variety of architectural styles; styles prominently featured in the district include Prairie School, American Craftsman, Colonial Revival, Victorian, and Spanish Colonial.

The district was added to the National Register of Historic Places on August 12, 1988.

== Images ==
White Place Historic District

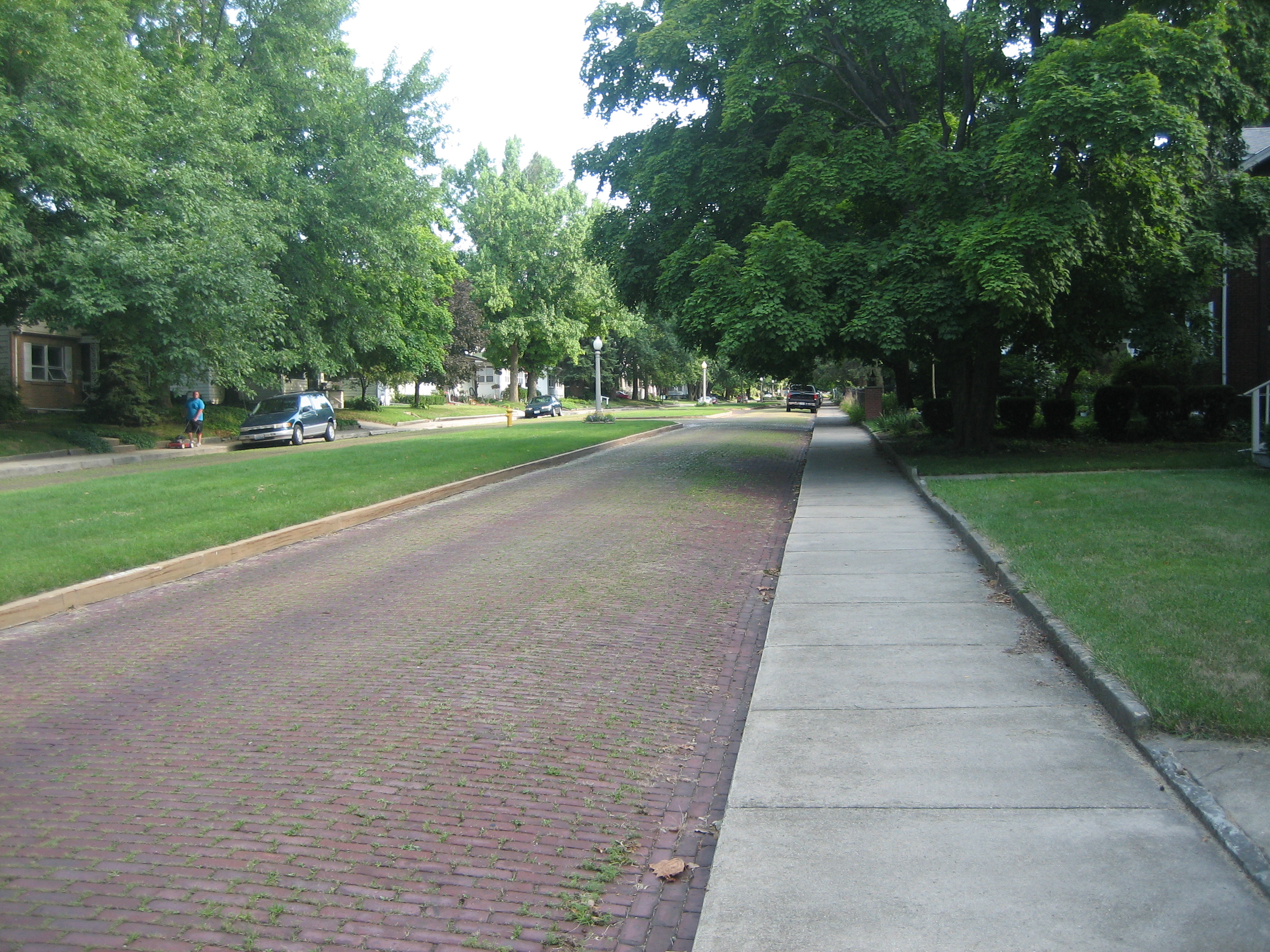
North end of White Pl, West side of street, looking South

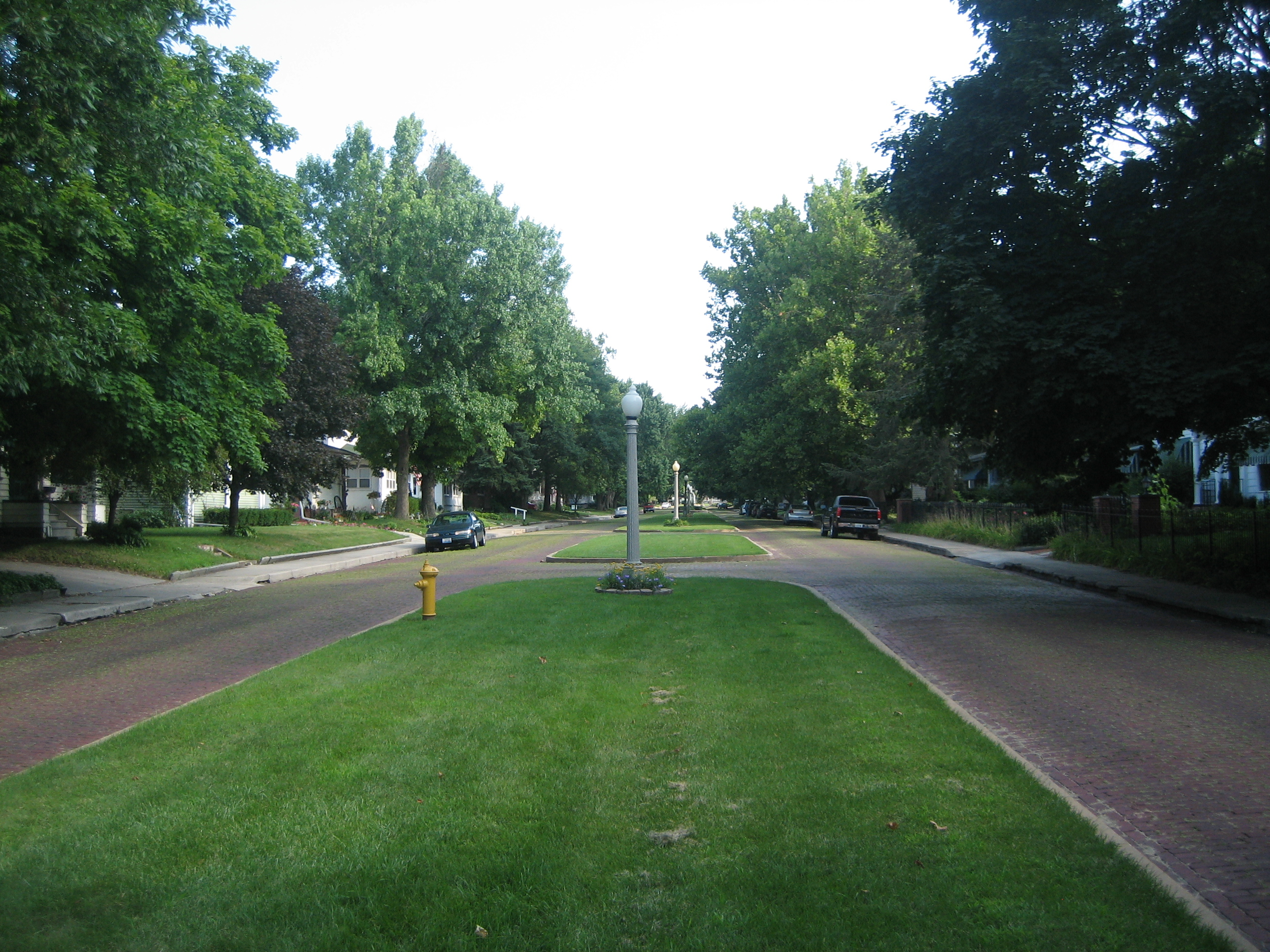
North end of White Pl, center median, looking South

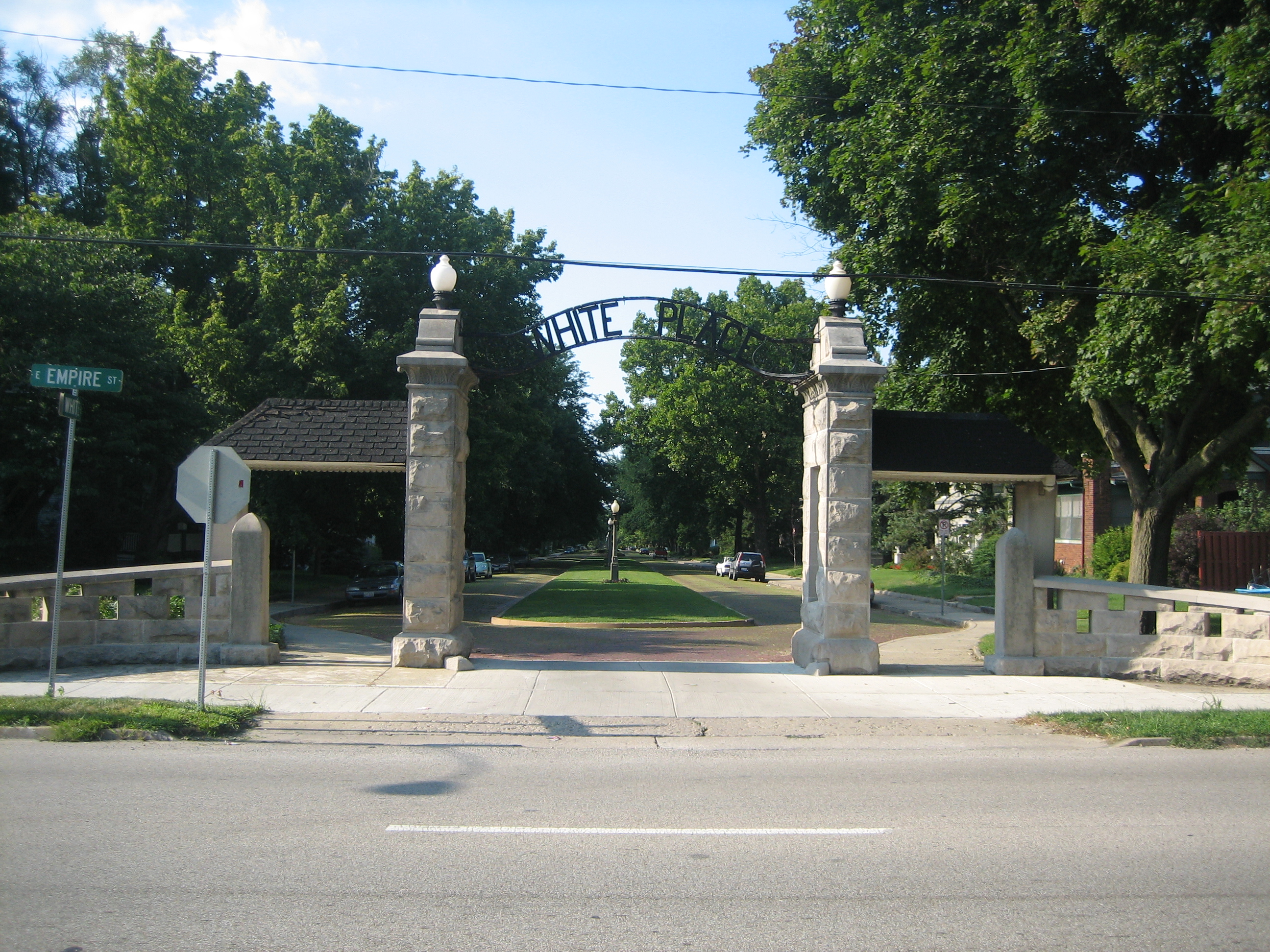
Gate at South end of White Place

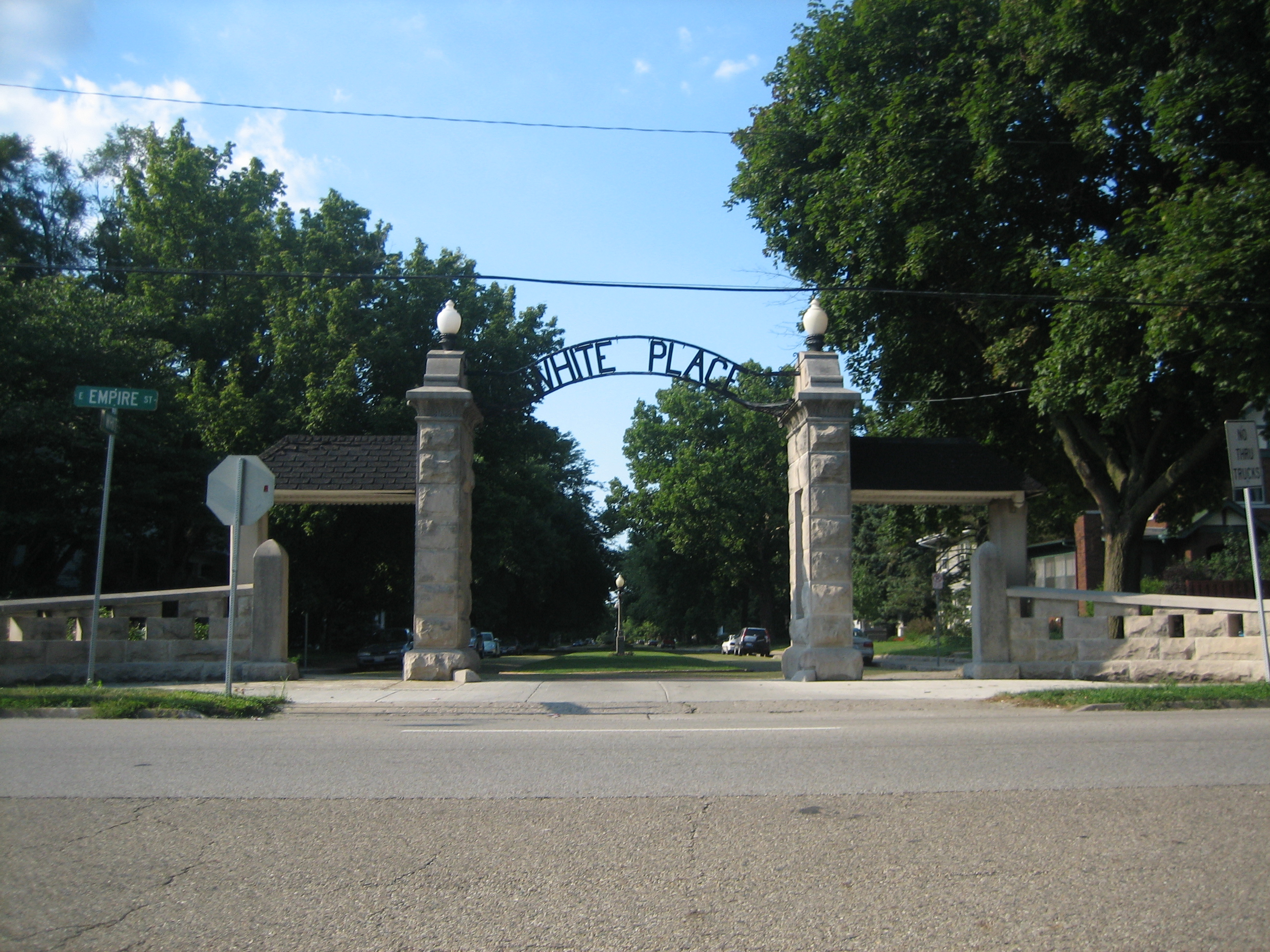
Gate at South end of White Place

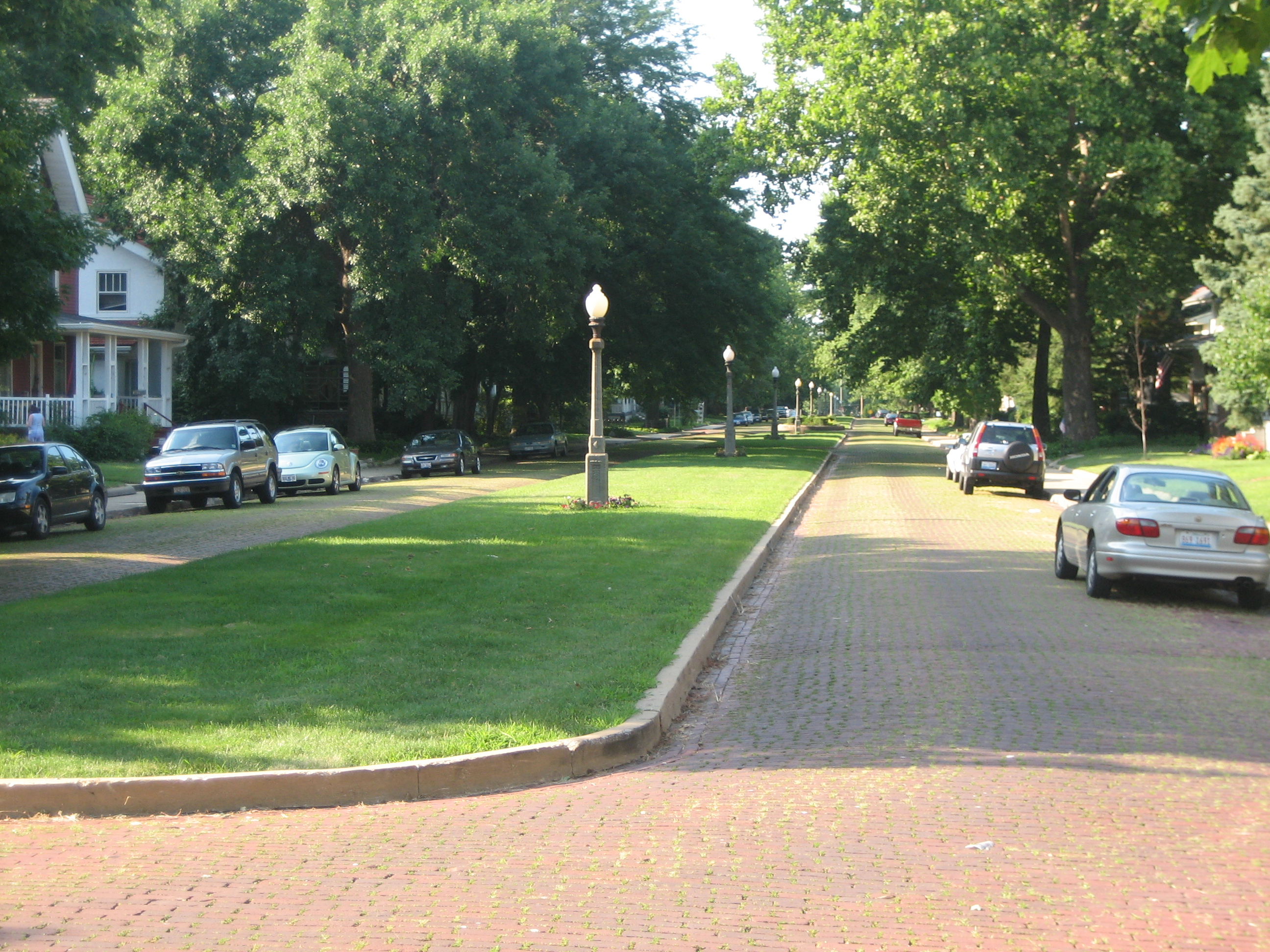
South end of White Pl, East side of street, looking North

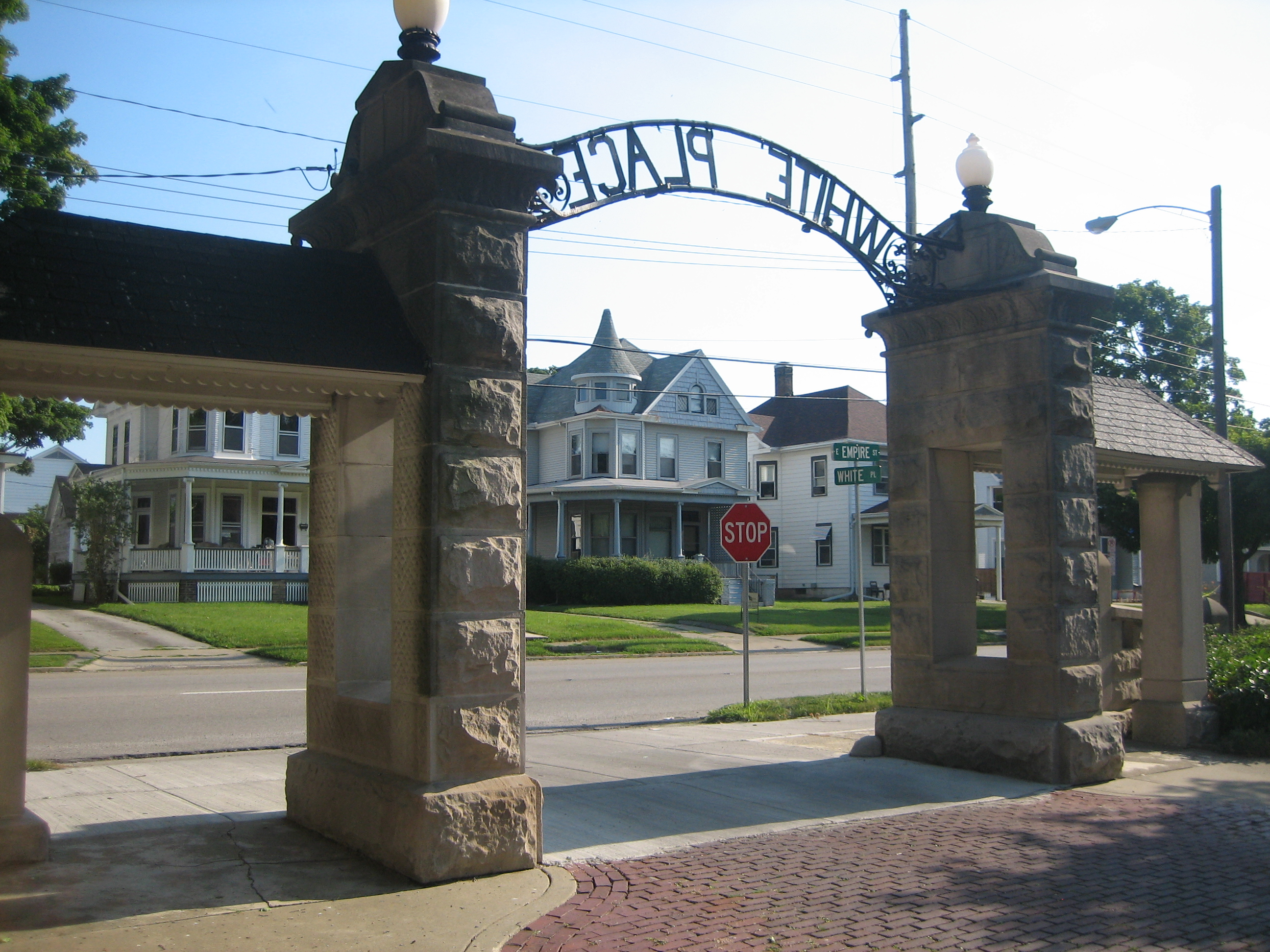
Gate at South end of White Place (from behind)
