= Eastland Mall (Bloomington, Illinois) =

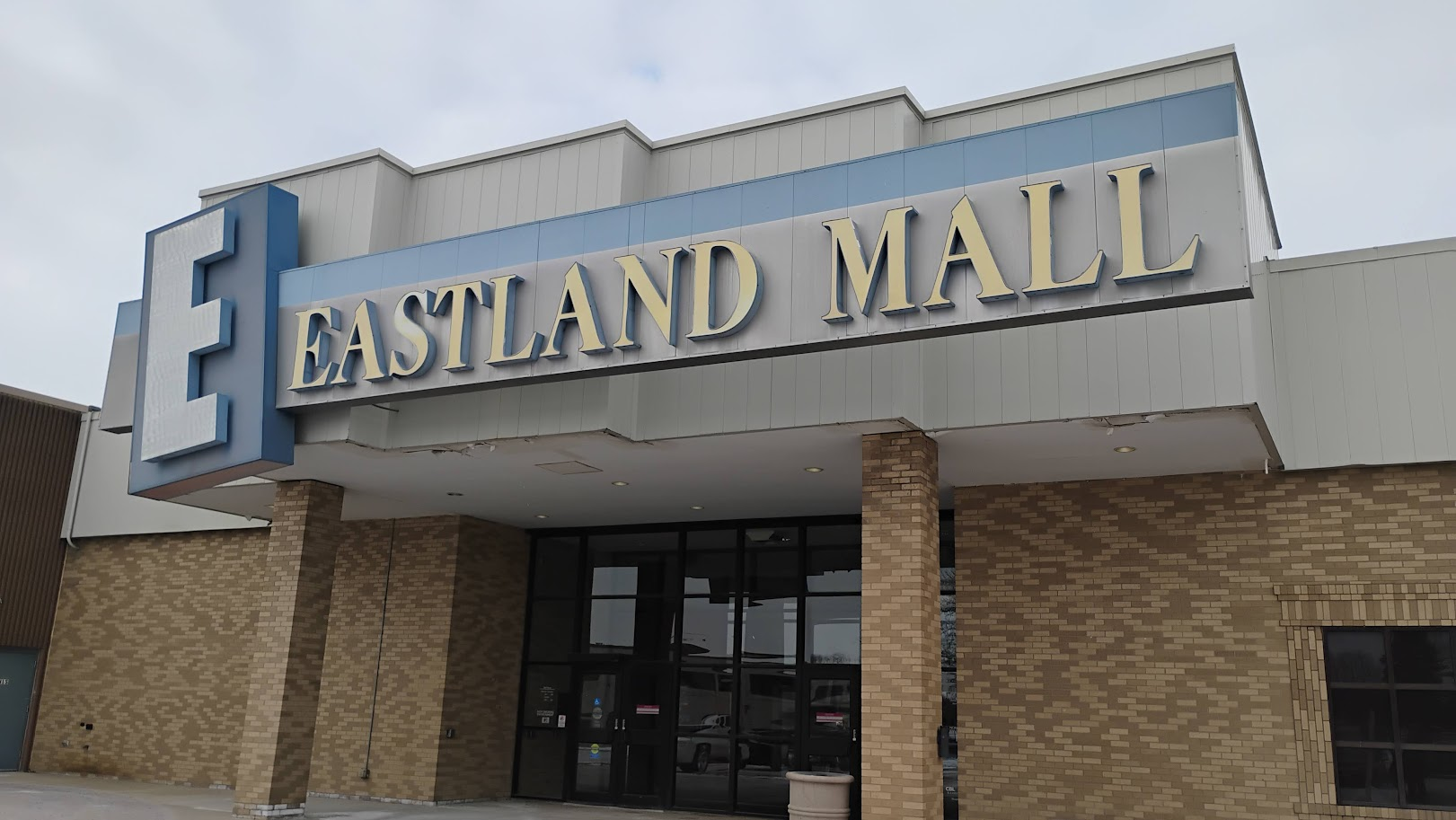
- An entrance to the mall.
- Location: Bloomington, Illinois, United States
- Coordinates: 40.486126°N 88.955698°W
- Address: 1615 East Empire Street Bloomington IL 61701 309.663.5361
- Opened: February 16, 1967
- Developer: Copaken, White & Blitt
- Owner: CBL & Associates Properties
- Architect: Sidney H. Morris & Associates
- Num. of stores: 75
- Num. of anchor tenants: 5 (2 1/2 open, 3 vacant, 1 subdivided into mall space,1 Small Anchor [Ulta Beauty])
- Floor area: 768,862 square feet (71,000 m^{2})
- Floors: 1 (2 in former Bergner's & Macy's)
- Public transit: Connect Transit
- Website: ishopeastlandmall.com

Eastland Mall is a shopping mall in Bloomington, Illinois. It opened in 1967. It features more than 20 stores and a food court. The anchor store is Kohl's. There are 3 vacant anchor stores that were once Macy's, Bergner's, and Sears. The fifth anchor store, JCPenney, has been rebuilt, partially demolished, and subdivided into in-line mall retail space. The mall is owned and managed by CBL & Associates Properties. The mall was featured on Dying Malls in 2024.

== History ==
Eastland Mall opened on February 16, 1967, anchored by JCPenney and Sears, both of which had moved from downtown Bloomington. The mall was built on the east side of town, at the southwestern corner of East Empire Street (Illinois Route 9) and Veterans Parkway (formerly U.S. Route 66, now Interstate 55 Business Loop). At the time, this intersection had only a gas station; however, a Kmart store was also under development at the time.

Eastland Mall housed many local and national tenants including Woolworth, Kirlin's Hallmark Gold Crown and a Walgreens drugstore, which relocated outside the mall in 1991. Besides the two anchors, several of the mall's tenants had moved from downtown, including Singer Sewing Center and Chadband's Diamond and Gold Center; the latter had been in business since 1892. Other major tenants included a grocery store and movie theater.

The mall was expanded several times in its history, first with a Bergner's department store in 1973, the first new department store to open in the city in more than thirty years. Kohl's was added a decade later. A food court was added in 1989 followed by a mall-wide renovation a year later, Sears expanded its store in 1997, and a Famous-Barr was added in November 1999, which became Macy's in 2006.

On January 4, 2017, Macy's announced that it would close its store as part of a plan to close 68 stores nationwide. The store closed on March 31, 2017. After the announcement, JCPenney stated on March 17, 2017, that they would be closing their store on July 31, 2017 as part of a plan to close 138 stores nationwide. This was later delayed for unknown reasons, and the store would then close at the end of August. In 2018, it was announced that the vacant JCPenney anchor store would be subdivided, with a Planet Fitness and H&M opening in the fall of 2018. On April 18, 2018, Bergner's announced that its store would be closing in August 2018 as the parent company, Bon-Ton Stores, was going out of business. The store closed on August 31, 2018 which left Kohl's and Sears as the only anchor stores. On June 8, 2018, it was announced that Hibbett Sports will open later in 2018. The new store will open next to the Charlotte Russe store. On August 22, 2018, Sears announced that its store would be closing in November 2018 as part of a plan to close 46 stores nationwide. After the store closed, Kohl's was the only traditional anchor store left. The closure of Woolworth made way for an Old Navy store. Chattanooga, Tennessee-based CBL & Associates Properties acquired the mall from Copaken, White and Blitt in November 2005 along with two other malls.

In summer 2026, CBL listed Eastland Mall for sale as an opportunity for redevelopment. In October, the Bloomington city council announced that Cullinan Properties was under contract to purchase Eastland Mall.

== Community impact ==
A second mall, College Hills Mall, opened in nearby Normal in 1980. This smaller mall was an unsuccessful competitor, lacking the big chain stores present at Eastland; over time, many stores such as MC Sports would relocate from College Hills to Eastland. College Hills Mall was demolished in 2005 for a new shopping mall called The Shoppes at College Hills.
