= Children's Village (disambiguation) =

Children's Village may refer to:

- Children's Village (New York)
- The Children's Village of the Hartford Orphan Asylum, see The Village (Hartford, Connecticut)
- Children's Village-Illinois Soldiers' and Sailors' Children's School
- Manzanar Children's Village
- SOS Children's Villages
- Kinderdorf Pestalozzi ('Pestalozzi Children's Village')
- Tibetan Children's Villages
- Msgr. Bryan Walsh Children's Village
- The Children's Village at the Canuanã School
- Hillcrest Children's Village
- Kfar Yeladim (1923–1931), "Children's Village", and educational institution for Jewish orphans, now a historical area in Afula, Israel
