= The Shoppes at College Hills =

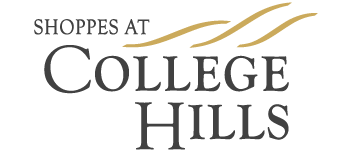

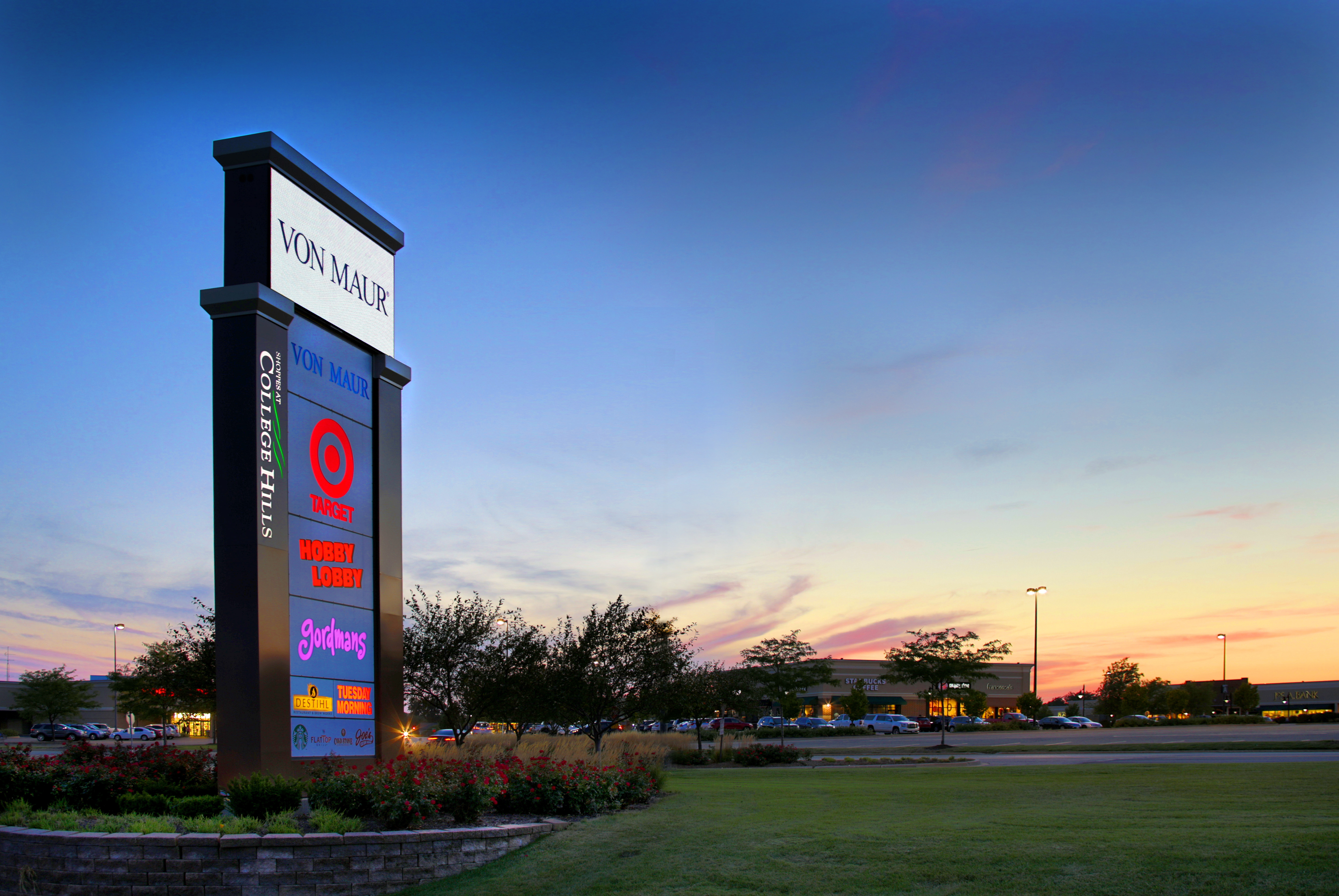
- The Shoppes at College Hills
- Location: Normal, Illinois, United States
- Coordinates: 40.5066°N 88.9563°W
- Address: 314 Towanda Avenue Normal, IL 61761
- Opened: August 14, 1980; 46 years ago (Mall); August 17, 2005; 21 years ago (Shoppes)
- Developer: Pepper Construction Co.
- Owner: Cullinan Properties
- Num. of stores: approx. 25
- Num. of anchor tenants: 4
- Floor area: 450,000 square feet (42,000 m^{2})
- Floors: 1
- Public transit: Connect Transit
- Website: https://www.theshoppesatcollegehills.com/

The Shoppes at College Hills is a lifestyle center retail complex located in the city of Normal, Illinois, USA. It is one of two major shopping centers in the Bloomington-Normal area (the other being Eastland Mall). The complex was built in 1980 as a small enclosed shopping mall called College Hills Mall, and was demolished and rebuilt in 2005 as an outdoor center. Anchor stores include Hobby Lobby, Target, Crunch Fitness, and Von Maur.

== History ==
Plans were first announced for College Hills Mall in 1978. The mall's first stage, comprising a Carson Pirie Scott department store and other mall shops, opened on August 14, 1980, followed by a Montgomery Ward anchor on September 25. Two years later, in 1982, Target was added as a third anchor. MetLife bought the mall in 1986 for $21 million. In the summer of 1989, Carson Pirie Scott's new parent company, P.A. Bergner, sold this location, as well as the Carson's location in Forsyth, Illinois stores to Von Maur.

Montgomery Ward closed its store in 1997; it was replaced with a Hobby Lobby crafts store in 1999. Also in 1997, Stein Mart added its first central Illinois location to the middle of the mall, while MC Sports moved to Eastland. Over time, many other stores relocated to the larger mall as well, leaving College Hills without most of its major chain stores. In addition, Stein Mart closed in October 2000. By June 2004, the only tenants remaining at the mall were the three anchor stores and a Diamond Dave's Mexican restaurant. After its closure, the entire mall building was demolished except for Hobby Lobby, Target and Von Maur. Cullinan Properties then redeveloped the property as an outdoor mall, with Gordmans being added as a fourth anchor. The new center officially opened in August 2005.

The shopping center was purchased in January 2017 by Alto Real Estate funds and M & J Wilkow. In April 2017, it was announced that Gordmans was going to be closing which closed sometime in 2017. In January 2018, it was announced that Hobby Lobby would move into the vacant Gordmans space which opened on June 25, 2018. On August 21, 2018, it was announced that Comcast will open a new store at the shopping center in winter 2018 or early winter 2019.
