= The Corn Crib =

Stadium in Normal, Illinois

Coordinates: 40.534251°N 89.004148°W

- Interactive map of The Corn Crib
- Location: 1000 W. Raab Rd., Normal, Illinois
- Capacity: 7,000
- Surface: Sprinturf
- Public transit: Connect Transit

Construction
- Groundbreaking: March 2009
- Opened: 2010
- Cost: $9 million ($13.3 million in 2025 dollars)
- Architect: Pendulum Studio
- General contractor: JHOOKER Construction Services

Tenants
- Normal CornBelters (FL/PL) 2010–present Heartland Community College Hawks (baseball, softball, and soccer) 2010–present FC Diablos 2019–present

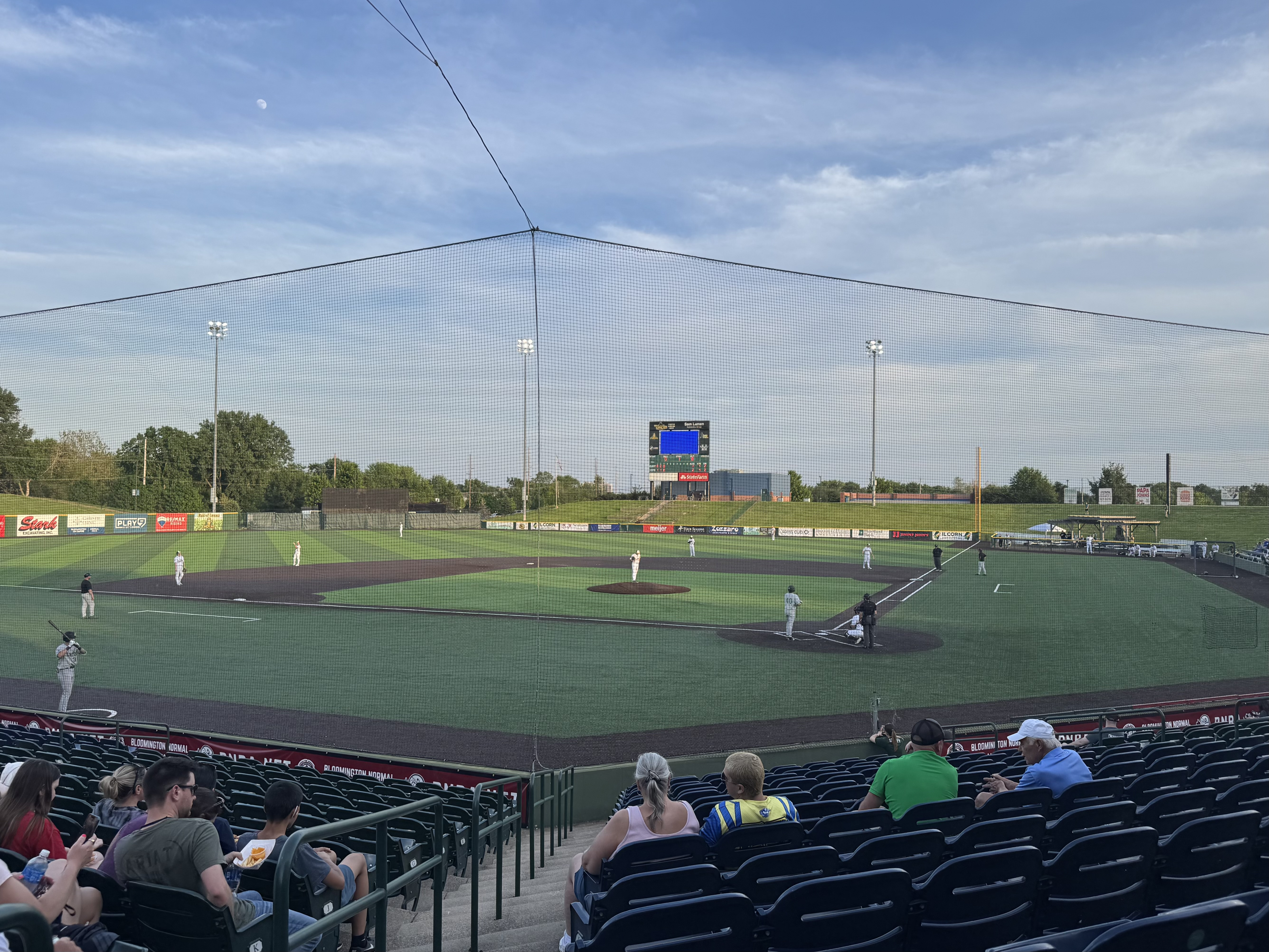
The Corn Crib at the CornBelters home opener on May 27, 2026

The Corn Crib is a multi-purpose stadium located in Normal, Illinois. It is primarily used for baseball and is the home of the Normal CornBelters, a collegiate summer baseball team. The ballpark has a capacity of 7,000 and opened in May 2010. It is located on the campus of Heartland Community College, hosting their baseball, softball, and soccer teams.

On October 20, 2009, the ballpark's name was officially announced.

Since the Spring 2019 season, soccer team FC Diablos has used the stadium as their home ground.
