= Constitution Trail =

Rail trail in Illinois, US

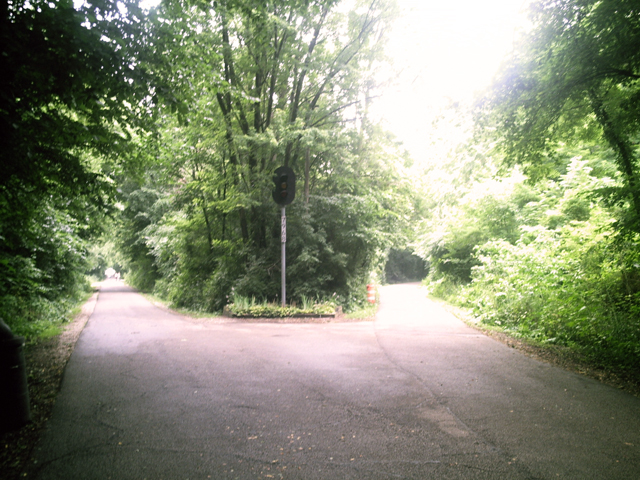
- A "fork" or the "Y" in the trail featuring an old railway signal.
- Established: May 6, 1989; 37 years ago
- Use: Running, walking, biking, inline skating
- Difficulty: Easy
- Season: All
- Surface: Asphalt
- Website: www.constitutiontrail.org

The Constitution Trail is a multi-use rail trail located in Illinois. It occupies an abandoned Illinois Central Gulf Railroad corridor that runs through the 'Twin Cities' of Bloomington and Normal in McLean County, Illinois.

The trail, which is owned by the municipalities of Bloomington and Normal, is used by bikers, inline skaters, walkers, runners and skiers, and covers approximately 37 mi (60 km). of former railways. It features the Camelback Bridge in Normal, a site on the U.S. National Register of Historic Places. Its official opening was May 6, 1989. In 2000, the trail was officially named a "Millennium Trail" by the White House Millennium Council.

In 2026, the trail received $2M in federal extension funding.

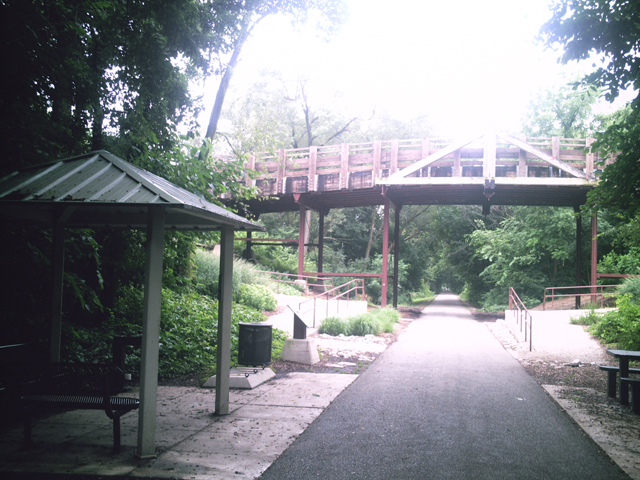
Camelback Bridge, overlooking the trail.

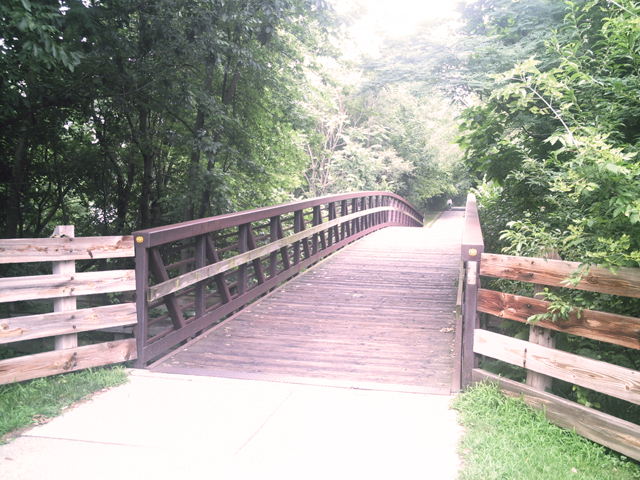
One of the many wooden bridges overlooking Bloomington City streets.

== Trail description ==
Constitution Trail consists of over 45 miles of trail and connects to the historic Route 66 Trail in McLean County. The trail features 32 trailheads around the cities of Normal and Bloomington with multiple historic sites and points of interest throughout the trail system.

=== Trail branches ===
- Illinois Central: The main trail that runs north-south through the Bloomington-Normal area. The trailhead starts north of Normal at the Kerrick Parking and Access Point (40°33′14.4″N 88°59′17.3″W) and ends after 6.5 miles at Croxton Ave, Bloomington (40°28′9.0″N 88°58′50.6″W).
- Northtown: Splits off from the Illinois Central branch and runs along the Ironwood Golf Course. Trail is almost 3 miles long.
- Bloomer Line: Splits off from the Illinois Central branch at the Allers Shelter Wayside and Connie Link Amphitheater. This branch runs west-east and is roughly 4.5 miles long.
- Collegiate: Splits off from the Illinois Central branch at the Normal Parks & Rec Office and ends at the Heartland Community College after 3.5 miles.
- Southtown: A 7-mile branch with the trailhead beginning at Pepper Ridge Park and ending at Streid Drive.
- Interurban: A little over 4.5 miles, this branch begins at the West Route 9 Wayside and ends at the Evergreen Memorial Cemetery.
- Route 66: Follows US Route 66 as it cuts southwest through Normal and Bloomington. There is an access point at Pepper Ridge Park in Bloomington. From Bloomington to Normal the trail is 7.8 miles. The total trail length is 37.2 miles.

=== Trail amenities ===
Amenities include restrooms, shelters/gazebos, parking, benches, water fountains, trash receptacles, and picnic tables.
