= Camelback Bridge =

- U.S. National Register of Historic Places
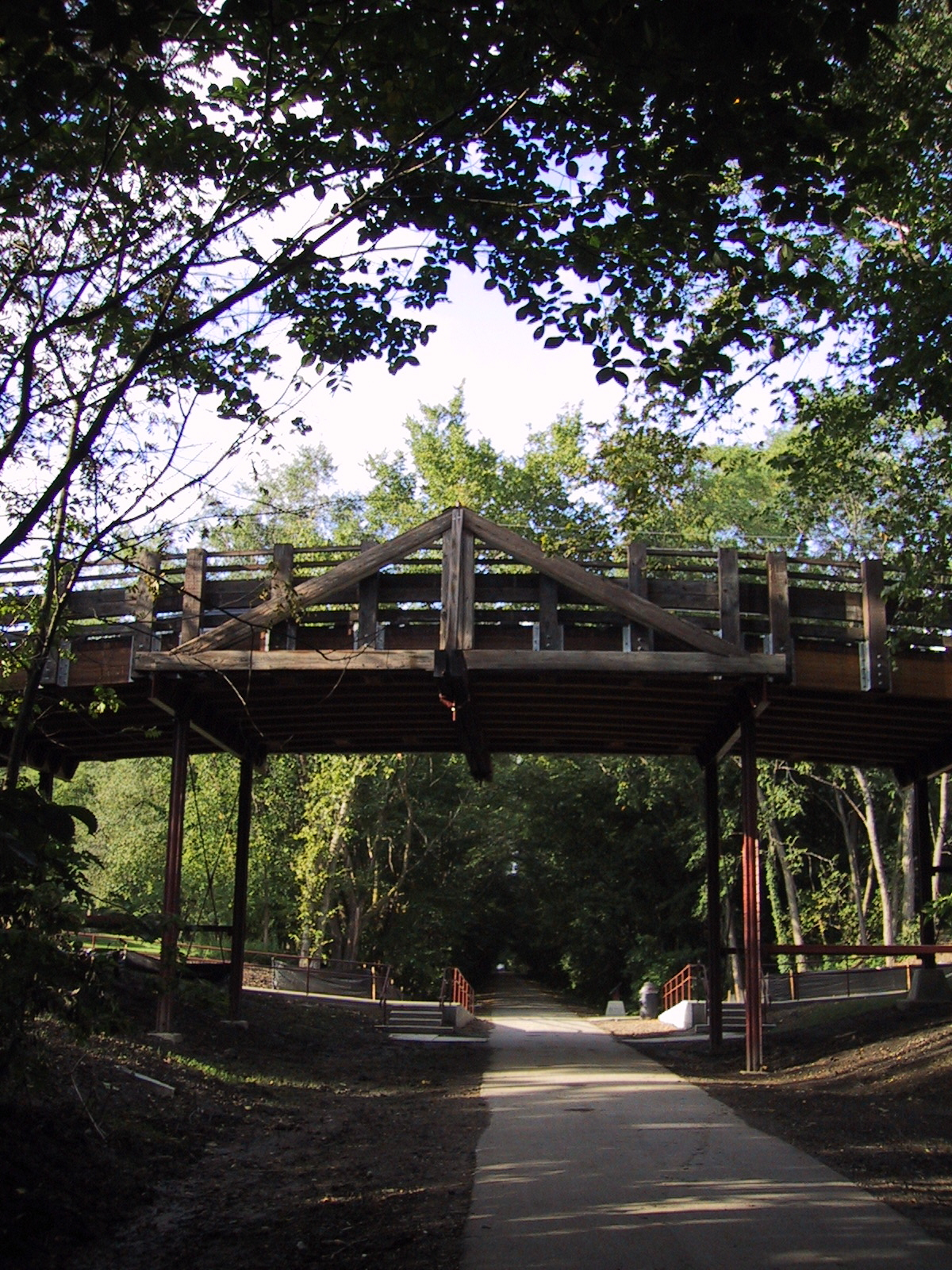

- Location within Illinois Location within the United States
- Location: Virginia Ave., across the Constitution Trail, Normal, Illinois
- Coordinates: 40°29′53.5″N 88°59′1″W
- Area: less than one acre
- Built: 1880s
- NRHP reference No.: 97000383
- Added to NRHP: May 15, 1997

The Camelback Bridge is a restored historic wooden bridge that arches over the Constitution Trail in Normal, Illinois. It is on the U.S. National Register of Historic Places. The bridge's main span is a wooden kingpost pony truss. The bridge is supported by Phoenix columns, a type of wrought iron column that was patented by the Phoenix Iron Company in 1862. It is one of only two bridges in Illinois using the columns.

== History ==
A wooden bridge was built by the Illinois Central Railroad around the 1880s to allow traffic on Virginia Avenue [previously known as Sill Street] to pass over its railroad line. The original wooden bridge was replaced in approximately 1906 by a cast iron and wood bridge built with 12 The Phoenix Iron Company cast iron columns, these columns were likely salvaged from another Illinois Central Railroad bridge which crossed the Illinois River at LaSalle. When the railroad stopped using the tracks, the original form was no longer needed and, during rehabilitation in the year 2000, the bridge was rebuilt to a lower height to allow easier access to vehicles.
