= Illinois Soldiers' and Sailors' Children's School =

- Civil War Orphans' Home'
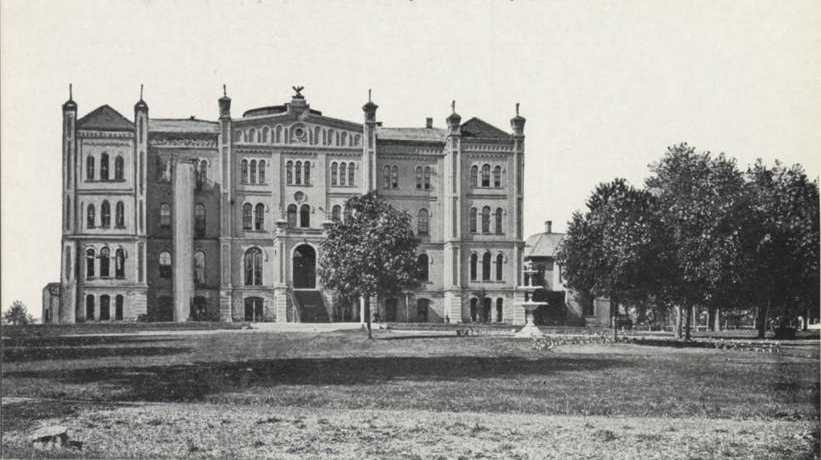
- The main building around the year 1908. It was erected 1869 in Victorian Romanesque style and razed in 1961.

Location
- Normal, McLean, Illinois; United States; 40.5217°N 88.9777°W

Information
- Established: 1865
- Founder: State of Illinois
- Closed: 1979
- Campus type: Small city

The Illinois Soldiers' and Sailors' Children's School (also known as ISSCS), founded by the State of Illinois as Illinois Soldiers' Orphans' Home (ISOH) for orphans of the Civil War, was a children's home located in Normal from 1865 until 1979.

== History ==
=== Founded after the Civil War ===
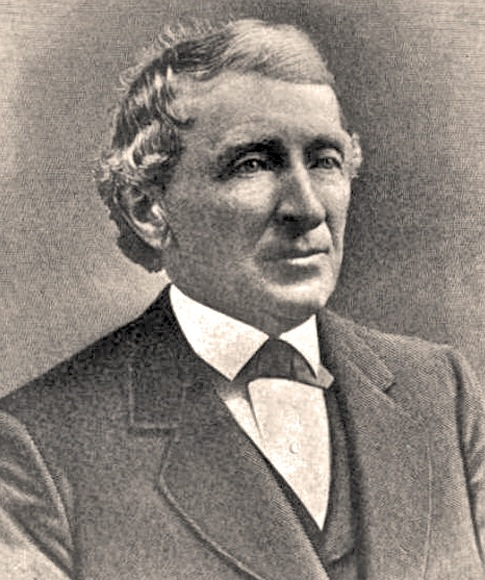
Jesse Fell supported the foundation of the orphans' home by generous donations.

Originally known as the Civil War Orphans' Home, ISSCS was established in 1865 by an act of the Illinois State legislature as a home for the indigent children of Civil War veterans. Jesse W. Fell, David Davis and other prominent residents of Bloomington and Normal pledged cash and land for the home. The State of Illinois selected Normal as the site of the home in May 1867 and set up three temporary facilities in Bloomington and Springfield to serve the children during construction. The Illinois Soldiers' Orphans' Home (ISOH) opened its doors on June 17, 1869 with 180 children in residence and one main building. Mrs. Virginia C. Ohr, a widow of a Civil War veteran, served as the home's first superintendent. Her tenure was controversial and included accusations of mistreatment of the children. A board of trustees operated the home and acted as legal guardian for the children.

=== After the Spanish–American War ===
In 1899, following the Spanish–American War, the Civil War Orphans' Home was amended to allow the children of soldiers and sailors of the Spanish–American War and the school began accepting children whose fathers had served in the army or navy during any war. From 1907-1924 dependent orphans who were not children of veterans also were admitted to the home when space was available. In the succeeding years indigent children of veterans of all wars became eligible for admission.

=== Administration ===
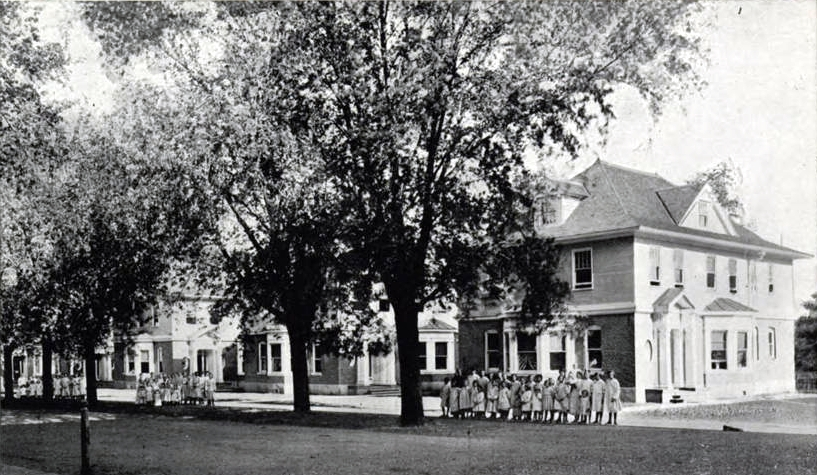
Girls Cottages with the occupants in the foreground, approximately in 1907

ISSCS was initially operated by a Board of Trustees, its first president in 1867 was Gustav Koerner, and inspected by the Board of State Commissioners of Public Charities created in 1869 to inspect and report upon the conditions in all state charitable institutions. The Board of Administration succeeded to these duties and retained executive and administrative control over the home until the creation of the Department of Public Welfare in 1917. While under the jurisdiction of the Department of Public Welfare the home's name was changed to the Illinois Soldiers' and Sailors' Children's School in 1931. The department also was authorized to place veterans' indigent children in foster homes or in other child-care facilities. This responsibility was handled by Division of Child Welfare staff members working at the school.

It was finally transferred to the Department of Children and Family Service in 1963. In 1916, the nearby Illinois State Normal University (ISNU) began administering the school's education programs which were held on-site until 1961 when ISSCS students began attending ISNU's University High School and Metcalf School.

Following the opening of the home, numerous expansion projects began to fulfill the needs of the children. In 1872, construction was completed on a kitchen, laundry, boiler house, steam heating plant and school. A hospital was added in 1881, which would become an industrial training building for girls when a new hospital was constructed in 1899. More renovations followed in 1889, adding a chapel, dining hall, play rooms and bathrooms in the main building. An electric light plant and industrial education building would later be added. As studies began to reveal the benefits of a home-like environment for orphans, the Illinois Soldiers' Orphans' Home adapted, building five cottages for girls in 1904. Eventually, the home would include 25 cottages along Girls' Row, Boys' Row and the Children's Village. By 1937, all children at the home would live in the cottages under the supervision of housemothers and housefathers. These cottages allowed for more individualized attention in a family-like environment. Appearance also bolstered the children's personal identity when state-issued clothing replaced uniforms beginning in 1927, allowing the children some choice in their clothes. By the late 1940s, as the numbers of children in foster care increased, the school began receiving higher numbers of delinquents and students with psychological or behavioral problems. In 1969, ISSCS celebrated its centennial and with it came new housing for the girls. The Y-shaped cottages allowed the children more privacy in a dorm-like atmosphere.

=== Closure ===
Despite these changes, high per capita cost of care, building deterioration and the dwindling number of children caused the state to opt for alternative forms of care for dependent orphans. In 1979, the state closed ISSCS after 114 years in operation. Today, many of the remaining buildings on the former campus have been converted to businesses or residences, while others remain abandoned.

Children who died while in the care of the school, were originally buried at a site on campus, but were later moved to a plot in the Evergreen Memorial Cemetery in Bloomington. There is a second plot for children who died after the move.

In July 2017 the ISSCS Administration Building was demolished by Stark Excavation. The owner of the property, Nicholas Africano, agreed with the Town of Normal to demolish the building for $500,000.

== Literature ==
- Cobb, Ruth (2007). A Place we called home. Normal, Illinois: Illinois Soldiers' and Sailors' Children's School Historical Preservation Society. OCLC 173484946.

== See also ==
- Children's Village-Illinois Soldiers' and Sailors' Children's School
