= Normal Theater =

- U.S. National Register of Historic Places
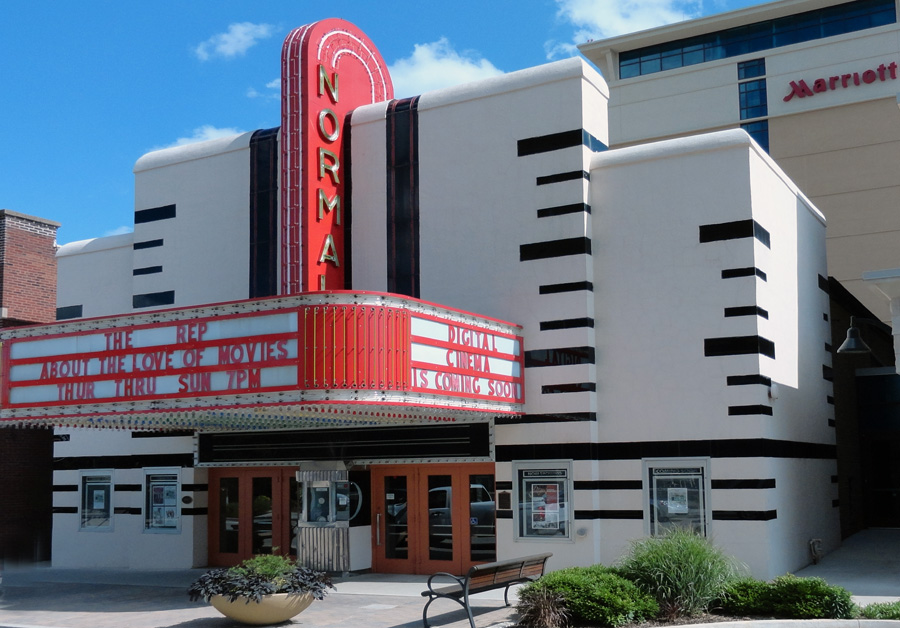

- Location within Illinois
- Location: 209 W North St., Normal, Illinois
- Coordinates: 40°30′33.3″N 88°59′11.36″W
- Built: 1937
- Architect: Arthur F. Moratz
- Architectural style: Moderne
- Restored: 1993
- Restored by: Town of Normal, Illinois
- Website: http://www.normaltheater.com
- NRHP reference No.: 97000818
- Added to NRHP: July 25, 1997

The Normal Theater, also known as the Normal Theatre, is a cinema located in the downtown area of Normal, Illinois of the United States of America, which is located in McLean County. The theater closed for a time in the early 1990s but reopened in 1993 after being purchased and renovated by the town of Normal. It has since been in continuous operation, showing a mix of first run and classic films. The building has been on the National Register of Historic Places since July 25, 1997.

== History ==
=== Development ===
Local architect Arthur F. Moratz designed the Art Moderne style building. The Streamline Moderne building was a state of the art cinema at the time which was built to "show sound movies in the best comfortable environment." The theater was built by Sylvan and Ruth Kupfer and leased to Publix Great States Theatres.

=== Opening ===
The Normal Theater opened for operation on November 19, 1937. At the time of opening, the theater had 620 seats. The grand opening featured the musical Double or Nothing starring Bing Crosby and Martha Raye, a Popeye cartoon, and newsreels.

"The Normal was known for genre and “B” pictures, especially westerns and musicals, as well as second-run fare."

=== Decline ===
In December 1974, the Springfield chain Kerasotes Brothers took over the theater. On January 8, 1982, Kerasotes closed the Irvin Theater in Bloomington and turned the Normal Theater into a “dollar house”.

In 1985, it was divided into a two screen theater, also known as twinning. The original commercial operation of the Normal Theater ended on May 16, 1991.

=== Restoration ===
The Town of Normal purchased the theater and reopened it in 1993 through a community restoration effort. The grand reopening on October 7, 1994 screened Singin’ in the Rain.

In June 1996, Normal received the “Preservation Project of the Year” award by the Landmarks Preservation Council of Illinois. On July 25, 1997, the Normal Theater was placed on the National Register of Historic Places.

The inside restoration installed plush, coral colored seating, blue, maroon and salmon colored walls, high-modern style aisle lights and layered ceiling of multicolored neon lights. Due to accessibility and building code changes, the Normal Theater now seats 385.
