= Chris Koos =

American politician

Mayor of Normal, Illinois
- Incumbent
- Assumed office February 17, 2003
- Preceded by: Kent Karraker

Member of the Amtrak Board of Directors
- Incumbent
- Assumed office January 24, 2024
- President: Joe Biden; Donald Trump
- Preceded by: Tom Carper

Normal Council Member
- In office April 2001 – February 17, 2003

Personal details
- Born: Christopher C. Koos; 1948 (age 77–78)
- Party: Democratic
- Education: Illinois State University

Chris Koos is the current mayor of Normal, Illinois, and is serving as a member of the Amtrak Board of Directors.

He is the longest serving Mayor in the history of the town of Normal.

== Political history ==
Chris Koos began serving as a Normal council member in 2001. He became mayor of Normal in 2003, and has been serving in that position for 21 years. He was preceded by Kent Karraker, who stepped down due to health reasons, leading to Koos's appointment as mayor.

He was originally nominated to the Amtrak Board of Directors in May 2020 by President Donald Trump, of which he was recommended to by Senator Dick Durbin. Koos was re-nominated by President Joe Biden in April 2022. He was finally confirmed by the U.S. Senate on January 24, 2024, to the Amtrak Board of Directors.

== Personal life ==
Born in 1948, he grew up in Bloomington-Normal and attended Central Catholic High School and Illinois State University.

Koos owns Vitesse Cycle Shop, a specialty biking and running store in Normal.

He was also an Infantry Platoon Leader in the Vietnam War from 1968 to 1971.

== In the media ==
Koos made an appearance in season 20 episode 519 (Grand Finale) of American Idol due to Normal local Leah Marlene making the finals. He later named Tuesday, May 15, 2022, Leah Marlene Day. The episode received 6.49 million viewers live.
