= Children's Village-Illinois Soldiers' and Sailors' Children's School =

- U.S. National Register of Historic Places
- U.S. Historic district
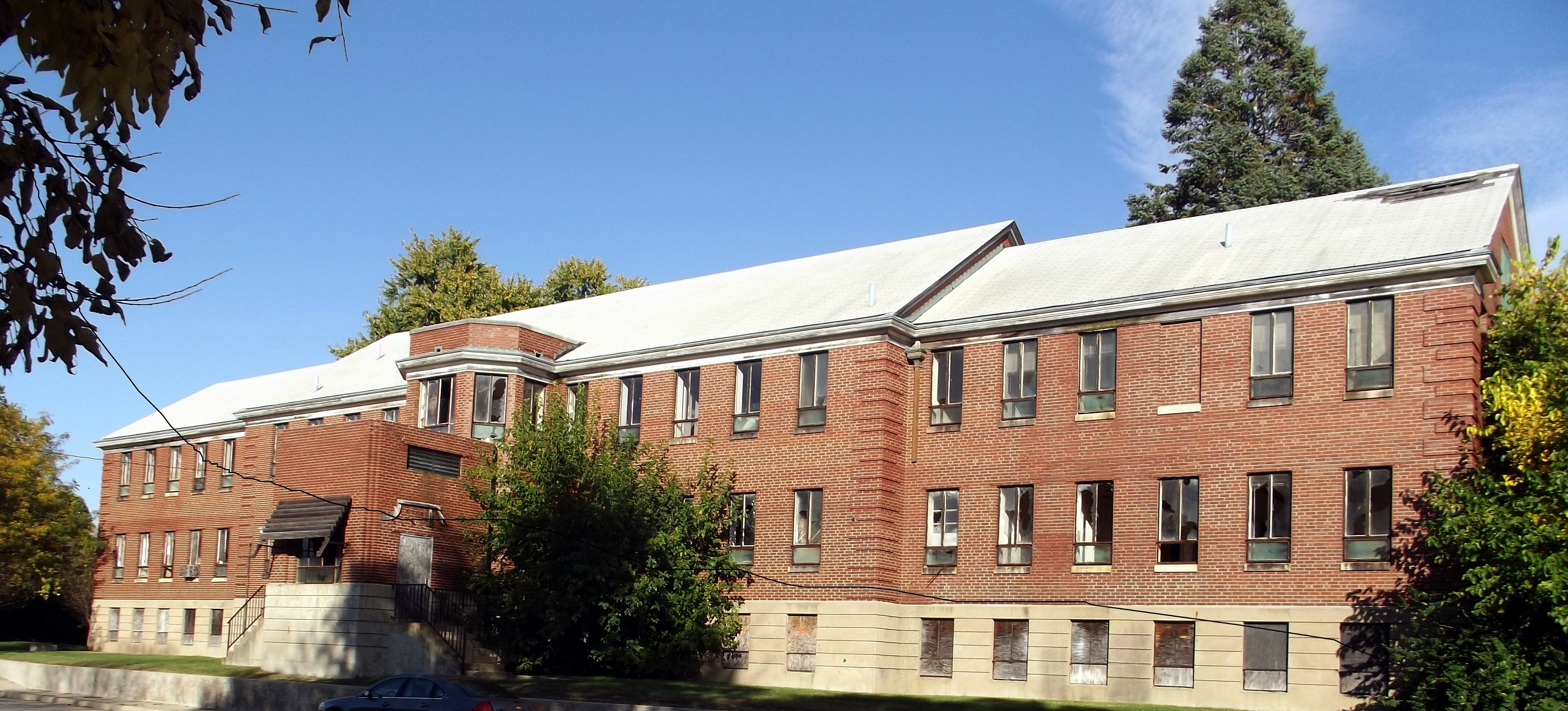
- View from Beech Street, 2011

- Location within Illinois Location within the United States
- Location: 1100 N Beech St., Normal, Illinois
- Coordinates: 40°31′09″N 88°58′40″W
- Built: 1930-31
- Architect: C. Herrick Hammond
- Architectural style: Tudor Revival
- NRHP reference No.: 100002418
- Added to NRHP: May 21, 2018

The Children's Village of the Illinois Soldiers' and Sailors' Children's School is a group of twelve cottages at the site of the Illinois Soldiers' and Sailors' Children's School, a former children's home at 1100 N. Beech St. in Normal, Illinois. The Illinois Soldiers' and Sailors' Children's School opened in 1869 as a home for the orphaned children of soldiers who had died in war. The Children's Village was built in 1930-31 as housing for children aged 3–8, as the school aimed to divide its housing by age. C. Herrick Hammond, the Illinois State Architect at the time, designed the houses in the Tudor Revival style. Eight of the twelve new cottages were used for housing, while the other four were smaller and used for play areas. Each of the residential cottages is one story tall with a steep cross-gabled roof and an arched entrance in one of the gable ends. The cottages were used by the school until it closed in 1979.

Children's Village was added to the National Register of Historic Places on May 21, 2018.
