= Msgr. Bryan Walsh Children's Village =

Msgr. Bryan Walsh Children's Village (formerly Boystown) is a facility run by Catholic Charities in Cutler Bay, Florida. The facility was opened in 1964 and modeled on the Boys Town of Nebraska. In 2018, unaccompanied minor immigrants and migrant children separated from their families at the border were housed at the center.

== History ==
The Msgr. Bryan Walsh Children's Village was formerly known as Boystown and was originally part of the Catholic Archdiocese of Miami. It was founded in November 1964 and was based on the Boys Town in Nebraska. Boystown was originally created by the archdiocese to help house minor refugees from Cuba. Eventually, the facility began to take in boys over 13 who needed a home. The shelter was meant to be temporary home and the average stay was around a year or so. Boystown included a swimming pool, animals for the children to interact with and sports facilities. Boys went to work and school in the community. Dorms in the form of air-conditioned cabins housed the boys. Two married couples and various counselors lived on the facility.

== About ==
The Catholic Charities currently runs Msgr. Bryan Walsh Children's Village which is located in Cutler Bay, Florida. In 2018, the center housed unaccompanied minor immigrants. In addition, children separated from their families due to the Trump administration family separation policy were housed at the Children's Village. United States Representatives, Debbie Wasserman Schultz and Carlos Curbelo both toured the facility in June 2018.
