= Normal, Illinois =

Town in the United States

- Town
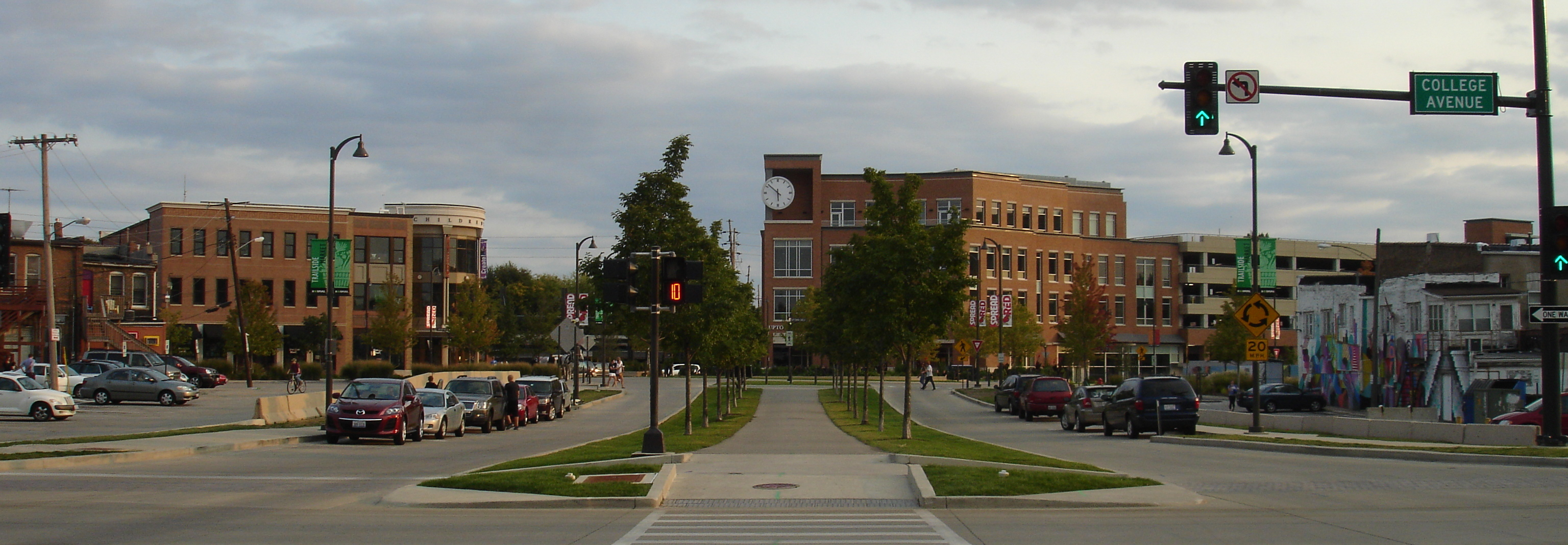
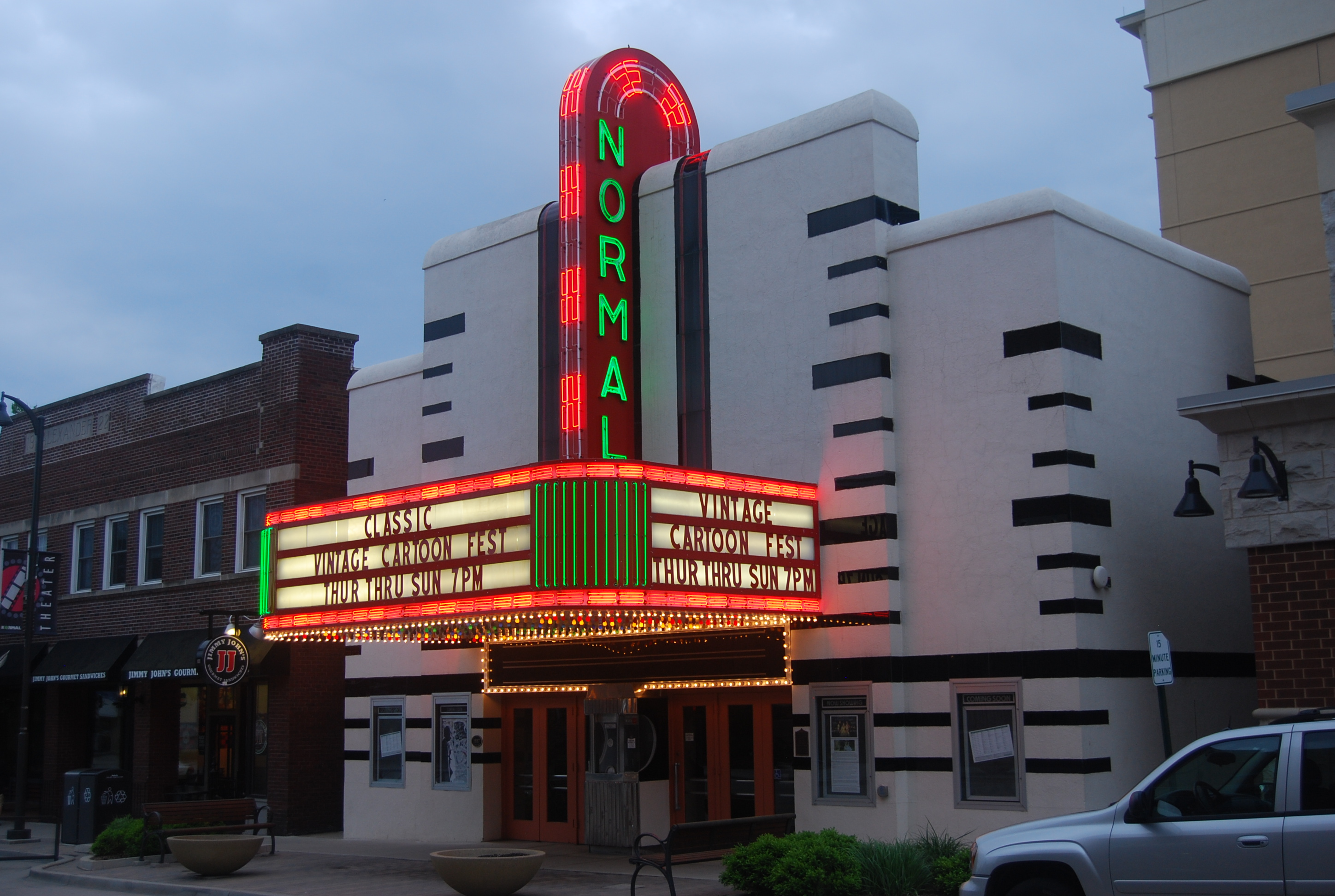
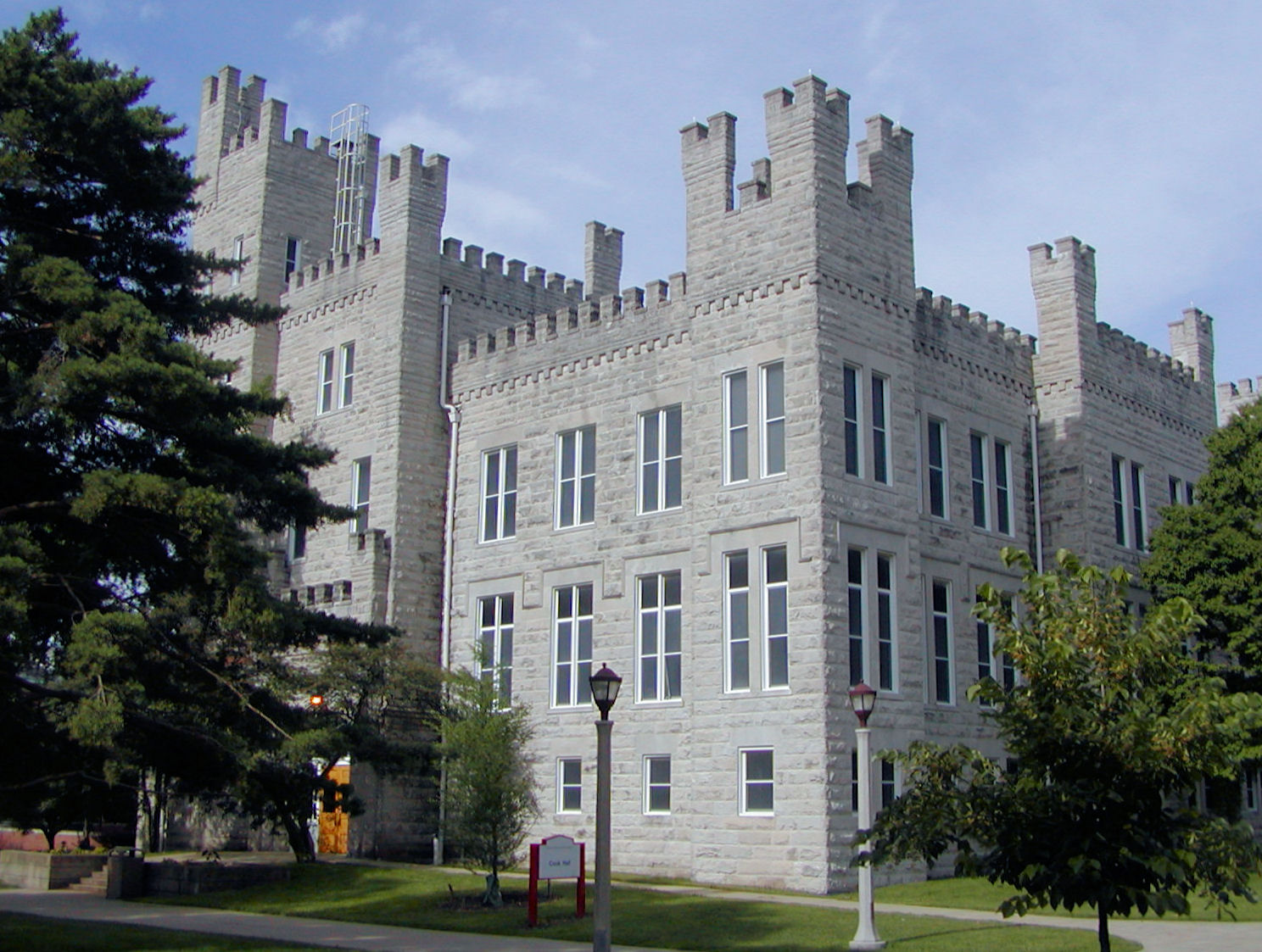
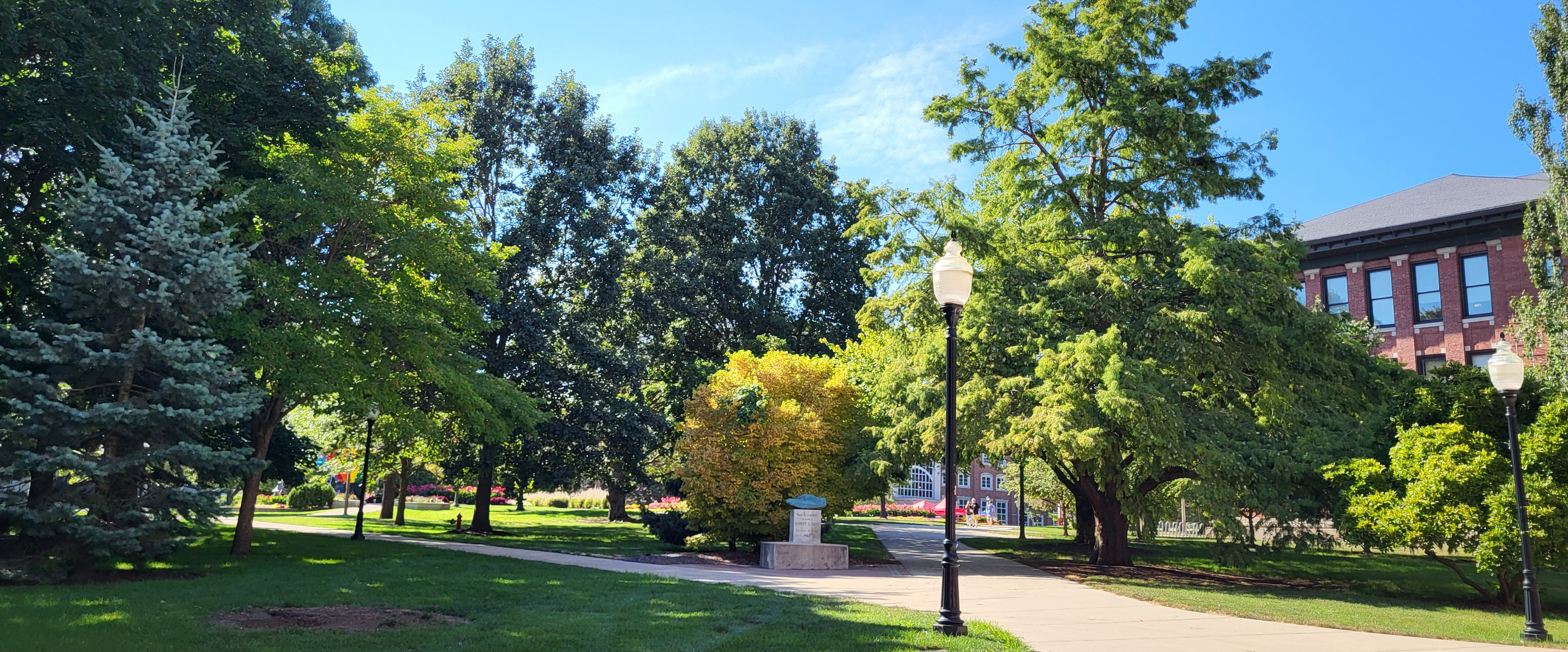
- Uptown Normal district and Uptown Station Normal Theater John W. Cook Hall Illinois State University

- Logo

- Location of Normal in McLean County, Illinois

- Location within Illinois Location within the United States
- Coordinates: 40°30′44″N 88°59′19″W
- Country: United States
- State: Illinois
- County: McLean
- Townships: Normal, Dry Grove, Towanda
- Settled: 1854
- Founded: February 1865
- Incorporated: February 25, 1867

Government
  - Mayor: Chris Koos
  - City Manager: Pamela Reece

Area
  - Total: 18.03 sq mi (46.70 km^{2})
  - Land: 17.94 sq mi (46.47 km^{2})
  - Water: 0.089 sq mi (0.23 km^{2}) 0.33%
- Elevation: 830 ft (250 m)

Population (2020)
  - Total: 52,736
  - Estimate (2024): 53,304 ▲
  - Density: 2,939.2/sq mi (1,134.85/km^{2})
- Time zone: UTC−6 (Central Standard Time (USA))
  - Summer (DST): UTC−5 (Central Daylight Time)
- Zip code: 61761, 61790
- Area code: 309
- FIPS code: 17-53234
- GNIS ID: 2396818
- Website: normalil.gov

Normal is a town in McLean County, Illinois, United States. The population was 52,736 at the 2020 census. Normal is the smaller of the two principal cities of the Bloomington–Normal metropolitan area, and is Illinois's seventh most populous community outside the Chicago metropolitan area. It is home to Illinois State University and Heartland Community College.

Founded in 1865, it was renamed Normal in 1867 after Illinois State Normal University (now Illinois State University), a normal school. Chris Koos has been the mayor of Normal since 2003.

== History ==
The town was laid out with the name North Bloomington on June 7, 1854, by Joseph Parkinson. From its founding, it was generally recognized that Jesse W. Fell was the force behind the creation of the town. He had arranged for the new railroad, which would soon become the Chicago and Alton Railroad, to pass west of Bloomington and then curve to cross the Illinois Central Railroad at a point where he owned or controlled land. Most of the original town lies south of these tracks, with Beaufort Street as its northern limit, and some blocks west of the Illinois Central and north of the tracks. Fell, his brothers, and associates quickly laid out many additions to the original town.

The town was renamed Normal in February 1865 and officially incorporated on February 25, 1867. The name was taken from Illinois State Normal University, a normal school (teacher-training institution) located there. The school has since been renamed Illinois State University after becoming a general four-year university. Normal is adjacent to Bloomington, Illinois, and when mentioned together they are known as the "Twin Cities", "Bloomington–Normal", "BN", or "BloNo".

In 2007, the town council voted to name the downtown area "Uptown Normal". As of 2011, Uptown Normal is home to the Children's Discovery Museum, Marriott Hotel and Conference Center, Hyatt Place Hotel, Uptown Station and Town Hall and a variety of local shops and restaurants all centered around a roundabout. The district is also home to the historic non-profit Normal Theater, a restored Art Deco theater owned by the Town of Normal that shows classic and independent films.

On August 31, 2021, a mass shooting occurred at a mobile home park in Normal that left three people dead and three more injured. The deceased were two women and a man, the latter being the gunman. The shooter was shot and killed by responding police officers.

== Geography ==
According to the 2010 census, Normal has a total area of 18.412 square miles (47.69 km^{2}), of which 18.35 square miles (47.53 km^{2}), or 99.66%, is land and 0.062 square miles (0.16 km^{2}), or 0.34%, is water.

=== Climate ===
Climate data for Normal 4NE, Illinois (1991–2020 normals, extremes 1893–present)
Month	Jan	Feb	Mar	Apr	May	Jun	Jul	Aug	Sep	Oct	Nov	Dec	Year
Record high °F (°C)	69 (21)	76 (24)	88 (31)	95 (35)	103 (39)	106 (41)	114 (46)	105 (41)	103 (39)	93 (34)	82 (28)	72 (22)	114 (46)
Mean maximum °F (°C)	55.3 (12.9)	59.9 (15.5)	72.3 (22.4)	81.5 (27.5)	89.2 (31.8)	94.5 (34.7)	95.2 (35.1)	94.2 (34.6)	91.4 (33.0)	84.1 (28.9)	70.0 (21.1)	58.8 (14.9)	96.8 (36.0)
Mean daily maximum °F (°C)	33.4 (0.8)	38.2 (3.4)	49.8 (9.9)	62.8 (17.1)	74.0 (23.3)	83.3 (28.5)	86.0 (30.0)	84.4 (29.1)	78.8 (26.0)	65.6 (18.7)	50.2 (10.1)	38.3 (3.5)	62.1 (16.7)
Daily mean °F (°C)	24.5 (−4.2)	28.5 (−1.9)	38.8 (3.8)	50.3 (10.2)	61.9 (16.6)	71.6 (22.0)	74.5 (23.6)	72.6 (22.6)	65.9 (18.8)	53.7 (12.1)	40.5 (4.7)	29.8 (−1.2)	51.1 (10.6)
Mean daily minimum °F (°C)	15.6 (−9.1)	18.9 (−7.3)	27.8 (−2.3)	37.9 (3.3)	49.8 (9.9)	59.9 (15.5)	63.0 (17.2)	60.8 (16.0)	53.0 (11.7)	41.8 (5.4)	30.7 (−0.7)	21.4 (−5.9)	40.0 (4.4)
Mean minimum °F (°C)	−5.6 (−20.9)	0.3 (−17.6)	9.4 (−12.6)	23.4 (−4.8)	36.1 (2.3)	46.9 (8.3)	52.5 (11.4)	51.2 (10.7)	38.8 (3.8)	27.6 (−2.4)	15.1 (−9.4)	2.8 (−16.2)	−8.9 (−22.7)
Record low °F (°C)	−24 (−31)	−24 (−31)	−15 (−26)	5 (−15)	21 (−6)	31 (−1)	41 (5)	38 (3)	22 (−6)	6 (−14)	−7 (−22)	−22 (−30)	−24 (−31)
Average precipitation inches (mm)	2.43 (62)	1.99 (51)	2.61 (66)	3.72 (94)	4.81 (122)	4.08 (104)	4.12 (105)	3.83 (97)	3.22 (82)	3.48 (88)	2.80 (71)	2.30 (58)	39.39 (1,001)
Average snowfall inches (cm)	7.5 (19)	5.5 (14)	2.2 (5.6)	0.5 (1.3)	0.0 (0.0)	0.0 (0.0)	0.0 (0.0)	0.0 (0.0)	0.0 (0.0)	0.0 (0.0)	0.8 (2.0)	3.6 (9.1)	20.1 (51)
Average extreme snow depth inches (cm)	5.0 (13)	5.0 (13)	2.0 (5.1)	0.4 (1.0)	0.0 (0.0)	0.0 (0.0)	0.0 (0.0)	0.0 (0.0)	0.0 (0.0)	0.0 (0.0)	0.7 (1.8)	3.2 (8.1)	7.8 (20)
Average precipitation days (≥ 0.01 in)	8.9	8.3	9.8	11.5	12.1	10.5	8.4	9.1	7.6	9.2	8.7	8.9	113.0
Average snowy days (≥ 0.1 in)	4.8	3.8	1.7	0.3	0.0	0.0	0.0	0.0	0.0	0.0	0.8	3.1	14.5
Source: NOAA

== Demographics ==
Historical population
Census	Pop.	Note	%±
1860	847		—
1870	1,116		31.8%
1880	2,470		121.3%
1890	3,459		40.0%
1900	3,796		9.7%
1910	4,024		6.0%
1920	5,143		27.8%
1930	6,768		31.6%
1940	6,983		3.2%
1950	9,772		39.9%
1960	13,357		36.7%
1970	26,396		97.6%
1980	35,672		35.1%
1990	40,023		12.2%
2000	45,386		13.4%
2010	52,497		15.7%
2020	52,736		0.5%
U.S. Decennial Census; 2018 Estimate

=== Racial and ethnic composition ===
Normal city, Illinois – Racial and ethnic composition Note: the US Census treats Hispanic/Latino as an ethnic category. This table excludes Latinos from the racial categories and assigns them to a separate category. Hispanics/Latinos may be of any race.
Race / Ethnicity (NH = Non-Hispanic)	Pop 2000	Pop 2010	Pop 2020	% 2000	% 2010	% 2020
White alone (NH)	39,121	43,313	38,528	86.20%	82.51%	73.06%
Black or African American alone (NH)	3,460	4,201	5,998	7.62%	8.00%	11.37%
Native American or Alaska Native alone (NH)	60	59	53	0.13%	0.11%	0.10%
Asian alone (NH)	996	1,673	2,306	2.19%	3.19%	4.37%
Pacific Islander alone (NH)	18	21	1	0.04%	0.04%	0.00%
Other race alone (NH)	43	71	201	0.09%	0.14%	0.38%
Mixed race or Multiracial (NH)	526	1,026	2,197	1.16%	1.95%	4.17%
Hispanic or Latino (any race)	1,162	2,133	3,452	2.56%	4.06%	6.55%
Total	45,386	52,497	52,736	100.00%	100.00%	100.00%

=== 2020 census ===
As of the 2020 census, Normal had a population of 52,736. The median age was 25.8 years. 18.1% of residents were under the age of 18 and 11.6% of residents were 65 years of age or older. For every 100 females there were 90.5 males, and for every 100 females age 18 and over there were 87.8 males age 18 and over.

100.0% of residents lived in urban areas, while 0.0% lived in rural areas.

There were 20,042 households in Normal, of which 25.5% had children under the age of 18 living in them. Of all households, 36.8% were married-couple households, 24.1% were households with a male householder and no spouse or partner present, and 33.1% were households with a female householder and no spouse or partner present. About 33.3% of all households were made up of individuals and 9.2% had someone living alone who was 65 years of age or older.

There were 21,903 housing units, of which 8.5% were vacant. The homeowner vacancy rate was 1.3% and the rental vacancy rate was 10.1%.

=== 2000 census ===
As of the 2000 census, there were 45,386 people, 15,157 households, and 8,184 families residing in the town. The population density was 3,332.6 inhabitants per square mile (1,286.7/km^{2}). There were 15,683 housing units at an average density of 1,151.6 per square mile (444.6/km^{2}). The racial makeup of the town was 87.57% White, 7.71% African American, 0.15% Native American, 2.21% Asian, 0.04% Pacific Islander, 0.93% from other races, and 1.40% from two or more races. Hispanic or Latino of any race were 2.56% of the population.

There were 15,157 households, out of which 27.3% had children under the age of 18 living with them, 42.4% were married couples living together, 9.3% had a female householder with no husband present, and 46.0% were non-families. 26.6% of all households were made up of individuals, and 6.2% had someone living alone who was 65 years of age or older. The average household size was 2.43 and the average family size was 2.96.

In the town, the age distribution of the population shows 17.5% under the age of 18, 38.1% from 18 to 24, 23.1% from 25 to 44, 13.7% from 45 to 64, and 7.6% who were 65 years of age or older. The median age was 23 years. For every 100 females, there were 88.6 males. For every 100 females age 18 and over, there were 85.5 males.

The median income for a household in the town was $40,379, and the median income for a family was $60,644. Males had a median income of $41,323 versus $27,486 for females. The per capita income for the town was $17,775. About 5.6% of families and 19.3% of the population were below the poverty line, including 9.4% of those under age 18 and 3.9% of those age 65 or over.

== Economy ==
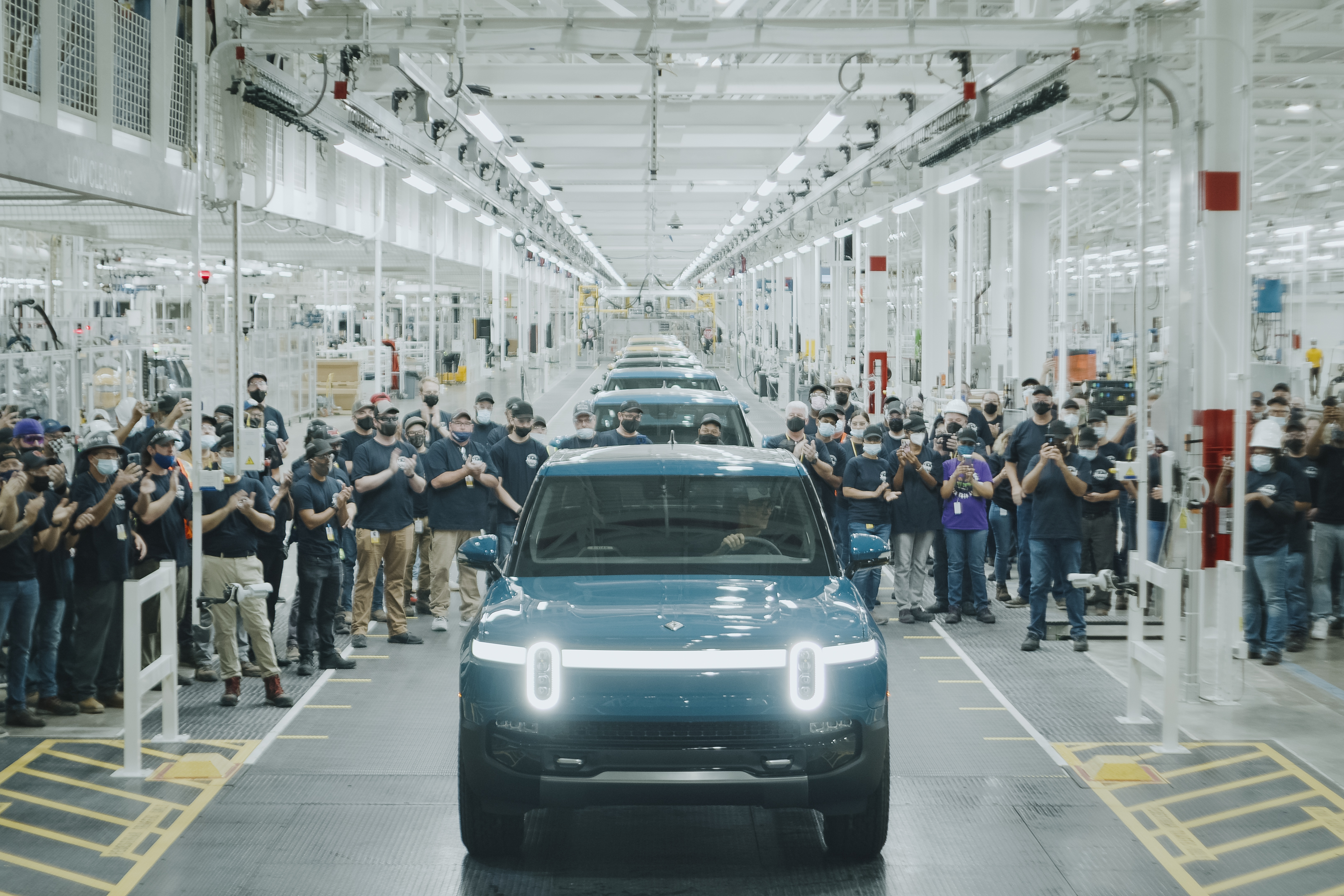
Rivian Automotive Plant in Normal

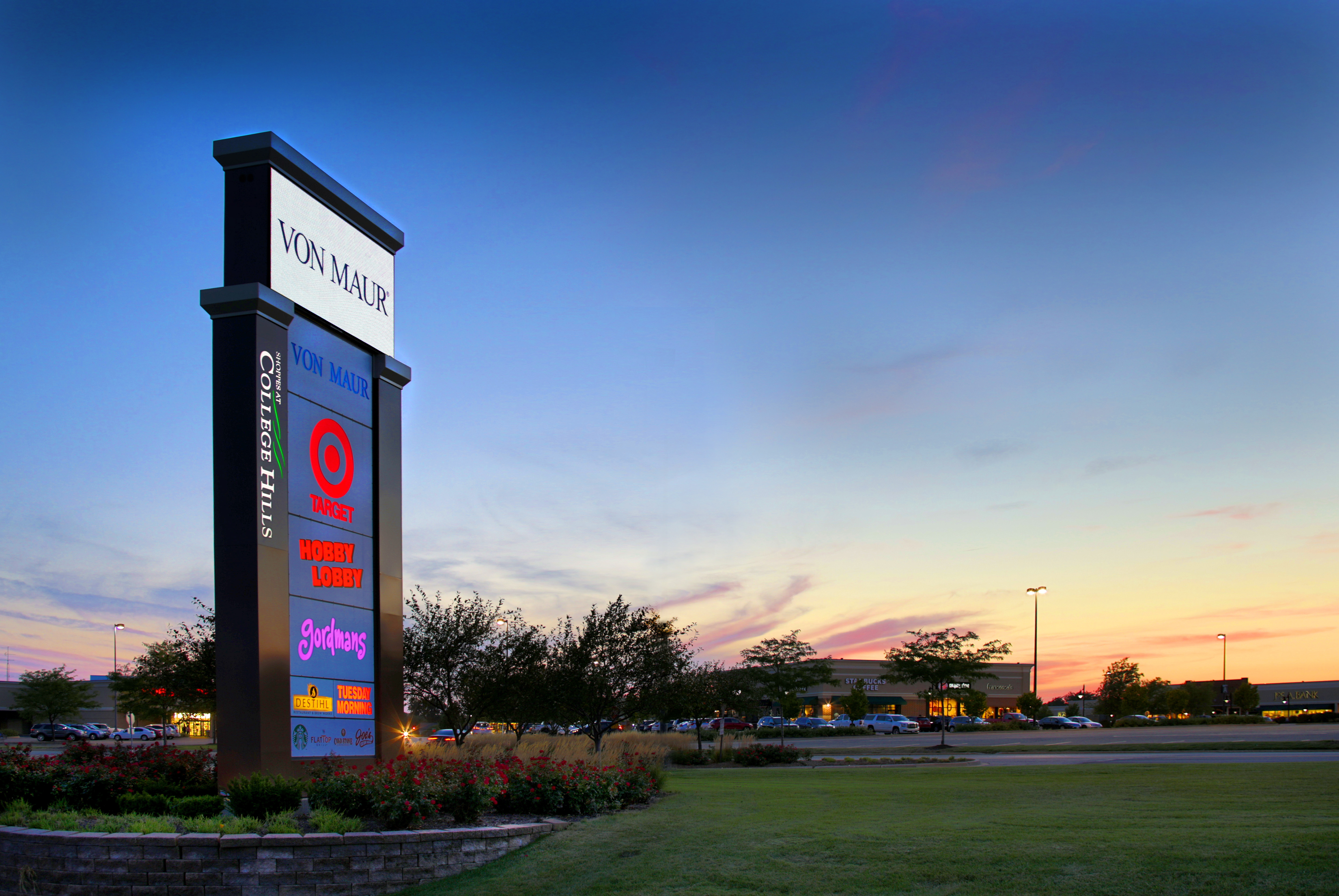
The Shoppes at College Hills

The original Steak 'n Shake restaurant opened in Normal in 1934.

Mitsubishi Motors North America and Chrysler Corporation established a manufacturing plant under the joint venture Diamond-Star Motors in 1986. It was Mitsubishi's only North American car manufacturing facility. It was closed May 31, 2016, and purchased by Rivian Automotive in January 2017.

Rivian's largest U.S. manufacturing plant is in Normal, where it builds all-electric vehicles since 2021. Amazon has ordered more than 100,000 electric vehicles to be built at the plant. The New York Times has described how the company has had a transformational effect on Normal.

Farnsworth Group, a national architecture and engineering firm with over 500 employees, announced it will be relocating its headquarters to Uptown Normal in the 5-story, $30M, Trail East Development expected to open in 2020, though as of September 2024 the development had stalled. Afni, a national customer service firm, and Illinois State University's Small Business Development Incubator (SBDI) are also expected to move into Trail East.

The town's major retail center is on Veterans Parkway on the east side of town. It includes The Shoppes at College Hills, an outdoor mall on the site of the former College Hills Mall.

== Arts and culture ==
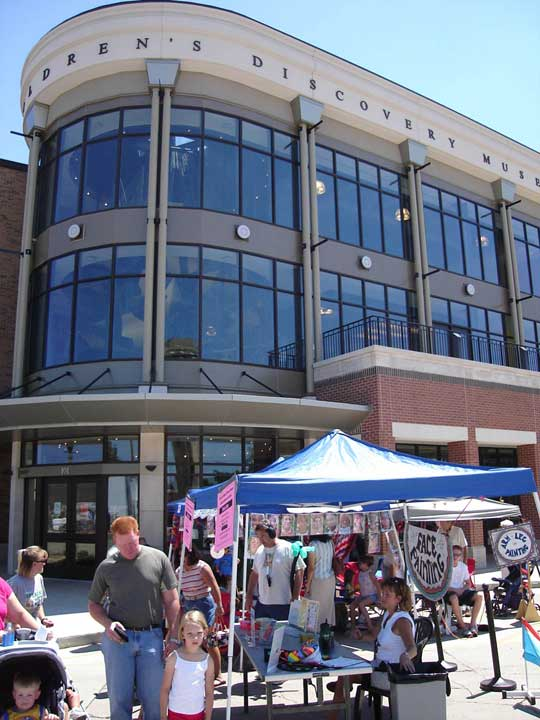
Children's Discovery Museum, 2008

The Children's Discovery Museum in uptown Normal provides hands-on exhibits, classes and programs for children. The museum has three floors of exhibits including a two-story mesh climber for children to climb to the third floor and a 2,000-square-foot (190 m^{2}) agriculture exhibit called AgMazing. The museum also offers education programs and houses the Discover More! Store. In 2010, the Children's Discovery Museum was deemed the best creative children's experience in Illinois by Media World USA's "Best of" Series. The Children's Discovery Museum was subsequently featured on a Best of Illinois television program on CBS 2 WBBM Chicago and on the Travel Channel.

The Illinois State University Planetarium offers a variety of science and astronomy programs for children from preschool to high-school. The planetarium is located in Felmley Hall of Science on ISU's campus. Public programs are usually offered on weekends and during special events.

The Challenger Learning Center relocated to Heartland Community College in 2010. The Challenger Learning Center promotes leadership, communication, problem-solving and critical thinking skills while offering an interactive, simulated space and science experience through scheduled team missions for students, public and corporate groups.

The Normal Public Library first began as a Reading Room sponsored by the Community Council with Margaret Hanna overseeing the collection of three hundred books. In 1938, citizens voted to help support the library through donations. In 1973, the library moved to its current location at 206 W. College Avenue. As of 2018, the library's collection has grown to nearly 200,000 materials.

=== Theatre ===
Normal Theater opened in 1937 and was the first theater in Bloomington-Normal built specifically for sound films. The strong art-deco design was, at the time, very avant-garde for a small Illinois town. The Normal Theater has been completely restored to its original condition. In addition to showing classic movies and independent films, the theater is used for a variety of activities including group outings, meetings and other events where assembly seating is required.

Braden Auditorium, located inside Illinois State University's Bone Student Center, serves as the hub of student life at ISU and a landmark resource to the Bloomington-Normal community. The Auditorium seats 3,457. Eight to ten annual shows feature a variety of Broadway musicals, pop and country stars, touring variety shows, comedians and big name performers.

The Town of Normal Parks and Recreation Department's "Normal Summer Music Theatre" program celebrated its 40th season in 2011. This program invites students in grades 8–12 to perform in two different productions each summer at the Connie Link Amphitheater.

Heartland Theatre Company performs a number of plays every season. Heartland's Annual 10-Minute Play Festival attracts playwrights from all over the country and their "New Plays from the Heartland" Midwest One-Act Play Competition allows winning playwrights from eight Midwest states to share their original works with audiences.

The Illinois State University Center for the Performing Arts provides the ISU campus and greater Central Illinois community with a wide variety of cultural activities. More than 20,000 people attend annual performances produced by the Illinois State University Schools of Music and Theatre in the center and all performances are open to the public.

The Prairie Fire Theatre is a not-for-profit organization, incorporated in 1998. All events are performed and directed by local talent, drawing from a largely untapped but highly skilled pool of professional artists.

=== Events ===
Make Music Normal has coincided with the international Make Music Day in June since 2013. The two-day festival highlights musicians from the Central Illinois area on multiple stages around Uptown. Local artists and vendors complete the festival atmosphere.

Established in 1983, the Sugar Creek Arts Festival is held each autumn in Uptown Normal. The combination of high-quality art, live music and food has kept the streets of Normal full of color and activity for over 22 years. The festival has a unique trait- only original pieces of artwork are shown; not copies of prints or items purchased overseas. The Sugar Creek Arts Festival, hosted by the McLean Country Arts Center, is one of the largest art festivals in Central Illinois and continues to grow.

The Sweet Corn Blues Festival is held each August in Uptown Normal and features over 50,000 ears of fresh sweet corn, sidewalk sales, arts, crafts and flea market vendors. The festival also serves as a welcome back for students at Illinois State University.

Beginning in 1978 with twenty-one performances on the tennis courts of Ewing Manor, the Illinois Shakespeare Festival has grown to become an internationally recognized company; now putting on thirty-six performances each season in a state-of-the-art, Elizabethan-style theater. In 2009, the Illinois Shakespeare Festival was named one of the ten best theatre festivals anywhere by author Susan Magsamen in her book, "The 10 Best of Everything Families: An Ultimate Guide for Travelers", published by National Geographic.

=== Historic sites ===
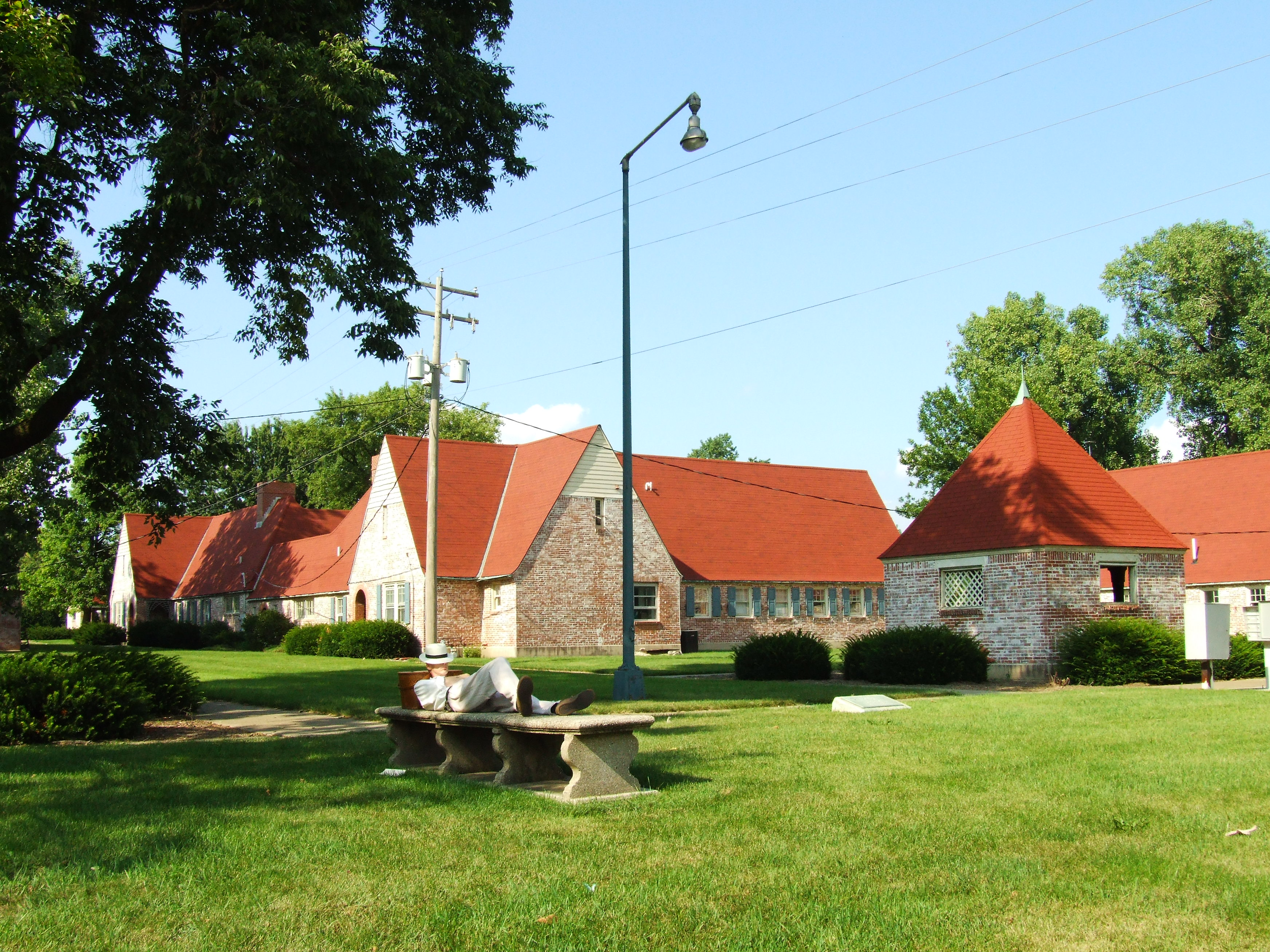
Normandy Village at the former Illinois Soldiers' and Sailors' Children's School

The Illinois Soldiers' and Sailors' Children's School, operated from 1865 until 1979, when it was officially closed. The reasons for closure included a rising high per capita cost of care, the deterioration of many campus buildings, and dwindling numbers of children referred by state agencies. Though several of the original structures have been abandoned and left derelict, others have been converted for a number of uses. These include a seniors community, a commercial pool providing swim lessons, and a community football field.

These three locations are listed in the National Register of Historic Places:

- Camelback Bridge
- John W. Cook Hall
- Normal Theater

In December 2010, a Route 66 Wayside Exhibit was installed at the historic Sprague's Super Service building in Normal. The exhibit tells the story of Route 66's great significance and impact on the community. Visitors are welcome anytime during daylight hours.

== Parks and recreation ==
Normal offers many parks and facilities. As of February 2011, there are 24 parks, facilities and trails operated by the Town of Normal. Fairview and David S. Anderson parks include swimming pools; Fairview Park includes a skate park for in-line skating and skateboarding; Carden Park includes "Safety Town", a place for pre-school aged children to "drive" tricycles complete with traffic signs; and Maxwell Park has a fenced-in dog park and Champion Fields.

The Bloomington-Normal Constitution Trail is a 24-mile (39 km) trail that operates on dedicated right-of-way through much of the city. The north–south segment of the trail follows the abandoned Illinois Central Gulf railroad from Kerrick Road in Normal to Grove Street in Bloomington. The east–west segment intersects the north segment at Normal City Hall Annex and continues east to Towanda-Barnes Road. The Liberty Branch begins at Commerce Drive and ends at Old Farm Lakes Subdivision. The Freedom Branch begins at Lincoln Street and ends at Route 9 West. The trail is open to walkers, runners, in-line skaters, skateboarders, cyclists, wheelchair users, and other non-motorized forms of transportation. During winter months, it is not cleared of snow, and is available to skiers; weather permitting.

The Ecology Action Center is a walk-in information and environmental education center for individuals, classes, workshops, and meetings. Opened in 1995, it provides the community with practical workshops on recycling, composting and energy saving, nature walks and educational field trips for schools and groups. Various publications and materials are available.

== Sports ==
=== Golf ===
In 2005, Golf Digest ranked Bloomington-Normal as the Fifth Best American City for Golf in their "Best in America" Metro Golf Rankings. Golf Digest ranked America's largest Metropolitan Statistical Areas on four different criteria: access to golf, weather, value of golf, and quality of golf.

- Ironwood Golf Course: 6,960 yards, Par 72, 18 holes. Ironwood Golf Course, owned and operated by the Town of Normal Parks and Recreation Department, is a championship course that includes four water hazards and four sets of tees that range from 5,580 to 6,960 yards. Ironwood's attributes, which include a grass tee driving range, large practice putting greens, a practice bunker, banquet room, pro shop, carts and individual or group lessons, offer a challenging test to players of all abilities. The 18-hole course, which opened in 1990, has hosted high school regional, sectional and conference championship tournaments and numerous collegiate tournaments; as well as state amateur qualification tournaments. Ironwood also hosts the COUNTRY Youth Classic each summer.
- Weibring Golf Club at Illinois State University: 6,730 yards, Par 71, 18 holes. Weibring Golf Club, formerly known as University Golf Course, is located near the northwest corner of the Illinois State University campus. The course was designed by golf course architect Robert Bruce Harris and opened for play in 1964. Re-designed in 2000, the course features bent grass greens, tees and fairways, continuous cart paths from tee to green, strategically placed bunkers and a variety of tees for every skill level. Weibring Golf Course has hosted IHSA Regional, Sectional and State Championships, NCAA Regional Championships and Intercollegiate Tournaments as well as annually hosting the COUNTRY Youth Classic.
- Golf Learning Center: Located at All Seasons, the Golf Learning Center is a synthetic turf facility, named one of the top 100 American golf ranges by Golf Range Magazine.

=== Facilities ===
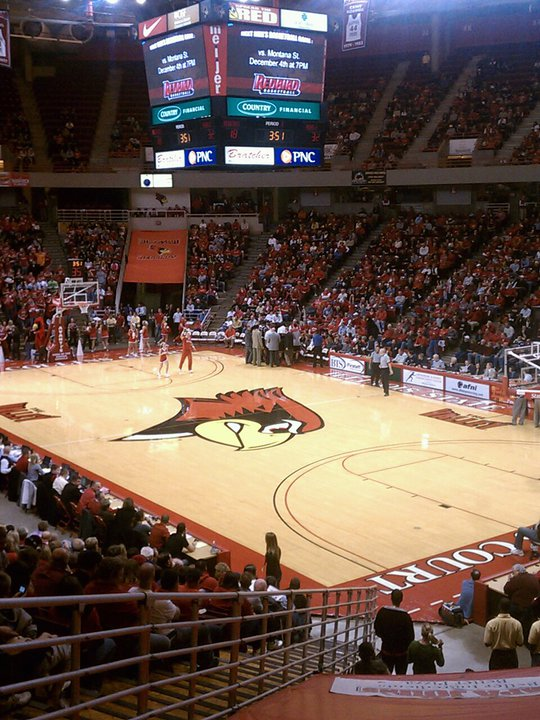
CEFCU Arena at Illinois State University

CEFCU Arena, formerly known as Redbird Arena is a 10,200-seat sports arena at Illinois State University. The arena is the home to the Illinois State Redbirds men's and women's basketball and volleyball teams. In addition, the arena also hosts the Illinois High School Association Girls Volleyball State Finals, Illinois High School Association Girls Basketball State Finals, Gamma Phi Circus, concerts, tournaments, conferences, job fairs, and other events.

Champion Fields at Maxwell Park has a seating capacity of 2,300 and 10 lighted softball fields. The fields are divided into three areas, each equipped with a concessions stand, restrooms, and seating for spectators. Champion Fields has played host to state, national and world softball events since 1996 including the NJCAA Division II Softball National Championship, Amateur Softball Association (ASA) Girls’ 18-Under Fastpitch National Tournament, and the State Farm Illinois Collegiate Softball Championship.

The Corn Crib is a multi-purpose stadium with a capacity of 7,000 patrons. The Corn Crib is home to the Normal CornBelters baseball team of the Prospect League and has been selected to host the Illinois High School Association Class 1A Boys Soccer State Finals through 2015.

Hancock Stadium is a 13,391-seat multi-purpose stadium at Illinois State University. The stadium is home to the Illinois State Redbirds football team, while also playing host to several annual events such as the State of Illinois Invitational High School Marching Band Championship and the Special Olympics State Summer Games. The newly renovated stadium includes 7 luxury boxes and 500 club seats, all of which provide access to the 5,500 square foot Hancock Stadium Club, which plays host to a variety of events outside football games, including receptions, banquets, weddings, and private events. The stadium is also highlighted by the addition of a 26 ft x 47 ft Daktronics 15HD LED Video Display in the north endzone.

=== Teams ===
Club	League	Sport	Venue	Established	Championships
Normal CornBelters	Prospect League	Baseball	The Corn Crib	2009	

- Illinois State Redbirds - Illinois State University Sports Teams
- Heartland Hawks - Heartland Community College Sports teams

== Education ==
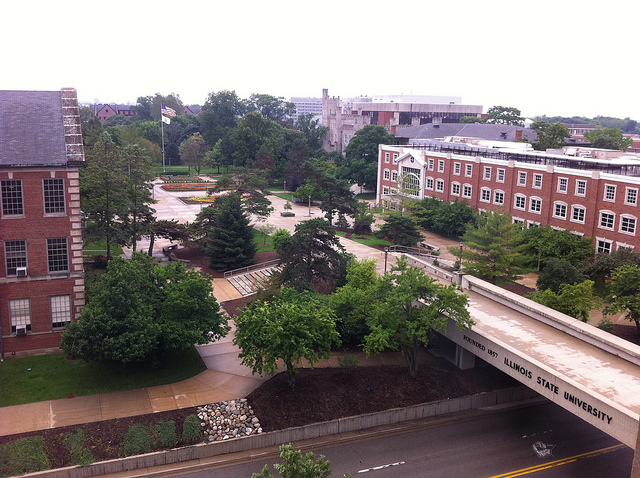
View of the Illinois State University quad and College Avenue

=== Primary and secondary ===
The Town of Normal is in the McLean County Unit District No. 5, which includes Normal Community High School, Normal Community West High School, and Kingsley Junior High School Two schools in Normal are operated by Illinois State University: University High School and Thomas Metcalf Elementary.

Private schools include Bloom Community School, Cornerstone Christian Academy, Epiphany Catholic School, and Calvary Christian Academy.

=== Colleges and universities ===
Normal is also home to two centers of higher learning.

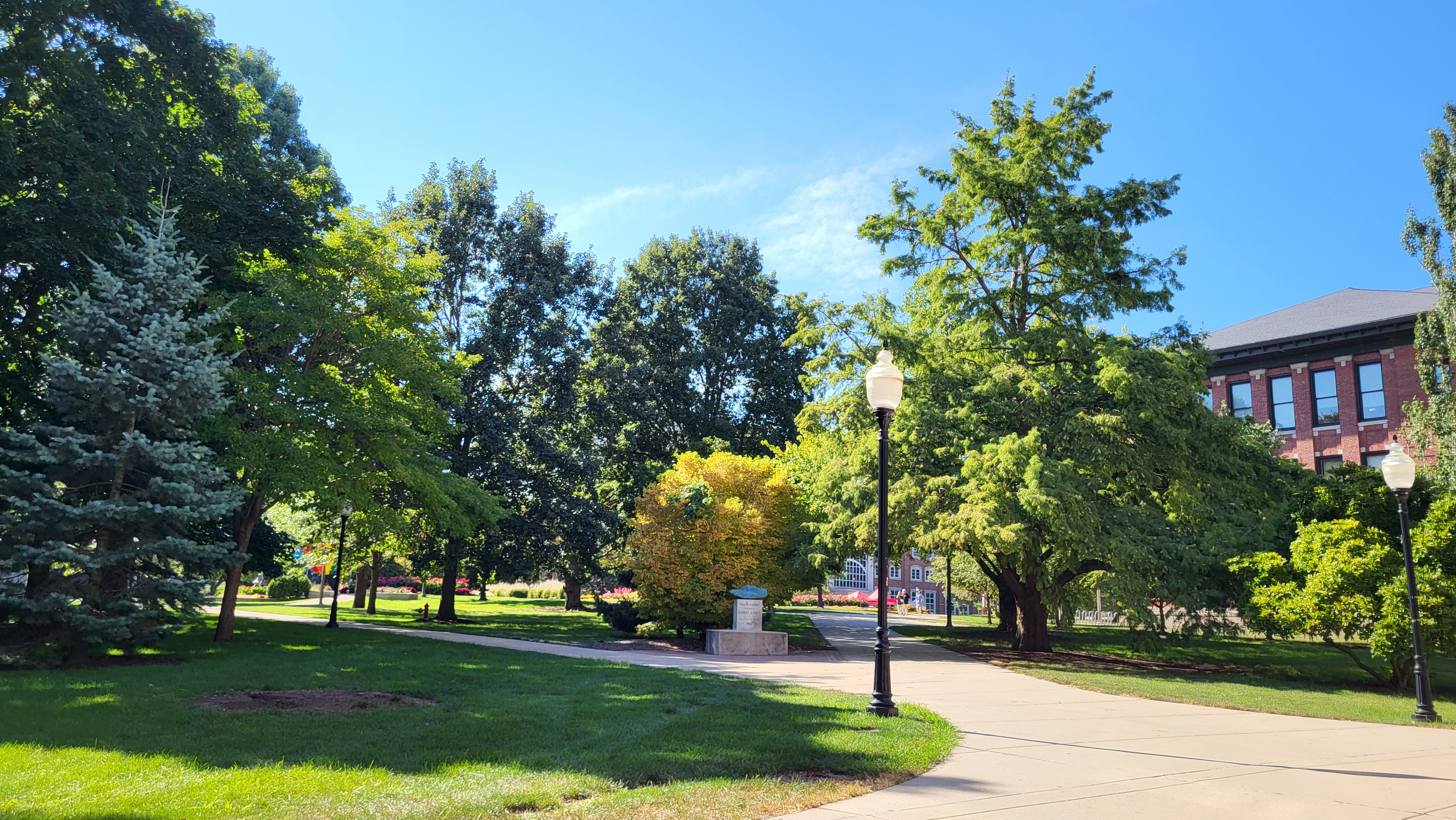
Main Quad at Illinois State University

Illinois State University, founded in 1857, was the first public university in the state, and is one of the Midwest's oldest institutions of higher education. It is a co-educational, residential university with an emphasis on the undergraduate program, offering more than 160 fields of undergraduate study. The Graduate School coordinates 38 masters, two specialist and seven doctoral programs. The 350-acre (1.4 km^{2}) campus includes over 60 major buildings with state-of-the-art technology. Watterson Towers is one of the tallest dorm buildings in the world. From meeting facilities to cultural opportunities through the arts and excitement of numerous sporting events each year, ISU is a vital part of the Bloomington-Normal community.

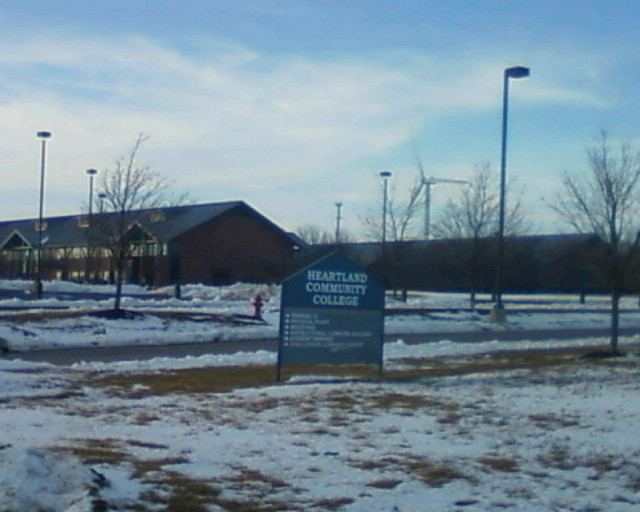
Heartland Community College

Heartland Community College, founded in 1990, is a community college that serves District 540, has 3 campuses, more than 4,800 students, is the youngest community college in Illinois, and offers training in more than 40 careers paths. The Heartland Community College Campus features a library, community meeting spaces, a pond, bookstore, café. Recently, Heartland completed a new Corporate Education Center and founded an athletic program that includes baseball, softball and men's and women's soccer teams.

=== Weekend education ===
Bloomington/Normal Japanese Saturday School (ブルーミントン・ノーマル補習授業校 Burūminton Nōmaru Hoshū Jugyō Kō), a Japanese weekend school, was established in 1986 and held at the Thomas Metcalf School. It has a separate office in Normal.

== Police ==
The Normal Police Department consists of 81 sworn officers and 26 civilian staff. The Chief of Police is Stephen A. Petrilli Jr. The department is nationally accredited by the Commission for Accreditation for Law Enforcement Agencies.

The department provides 24-hour town-wide coverage. In addition to deploying officers in patrol cars, the department also deploys officers on bike patrols and has been doing so since the 1980s. The department also has a full-time Criminal Investigation Division and two full-service canines.

== Media ==
=== Print ===
- The Pantagraph, local newspaper – daily
- Normalite newspaper — weekly
- The Vidette, ISU student newspaper − semiweekly

=== FM radio ===
- 88.1 WESN, Illinois Wesleyan University College radio
- 89.1 WGLT, Illinois State University Public broadcasting
- 91.5 WCIC, Christian AC (RDS)
- 93.7 WPOK "Route 24 Radio", Classic hits (RDS)
- 94.9 WXRJ-LP, Community radio
- 96.7 WIHN "96.7 I-Rock", Active rock (RDS)
- 97.9 WBBE "97.9 Bob FM", Adult hits (RDS)
- 98.9 W255AI (Translates 91.5 WCIC), Christian AC (RDS)
- 99.5 WZIM "Magic 99.5", AC (RDS)
- 100.1 W261BK (Translates 88.5 WBNH), Religious Music
- 100.7 WWHX "Hits 100.7", CHR (RDS)
- 101.5 WBNQ, CHR/Pop (RDS – Artist/Title)
- 103.3 WZND-LP "Fuzed Radio", Illinois State University student radio station Top 40 (Also simulcast on cable channel 4 available in student dorm rooms) (RDS)
- 104.1 WBWN "B 104", Country (RDS – Artist/Title)
- 107.7 WIBL "The Bull 107.7", Country (RDS)

=== AM radio ===
- 1230 WJBC, News/Talk

== Transportation ==
Normal is served by I-39, I-55, Interstate 74, one passenger railroad line, the Central Illinois Regional Airport (BMI) in neighboring Bloomington, and Connect Transit provides public bus service in the area.

=== Highways ===
Interstate Highways
Interstate 39
Interstate 55
Interstate 74

US Highways
US 51
US 150

Illinois Highways
Route 9

Interstate 55 wraps around the north and northwest edge of the town. Interstate 74 shares the I-55 roadway on the western edge of Normal before splitting off toward the northwest. Normal is the southern terminus of Interstate 39. Historic Route 66 runs through the town.

=== Airport ===
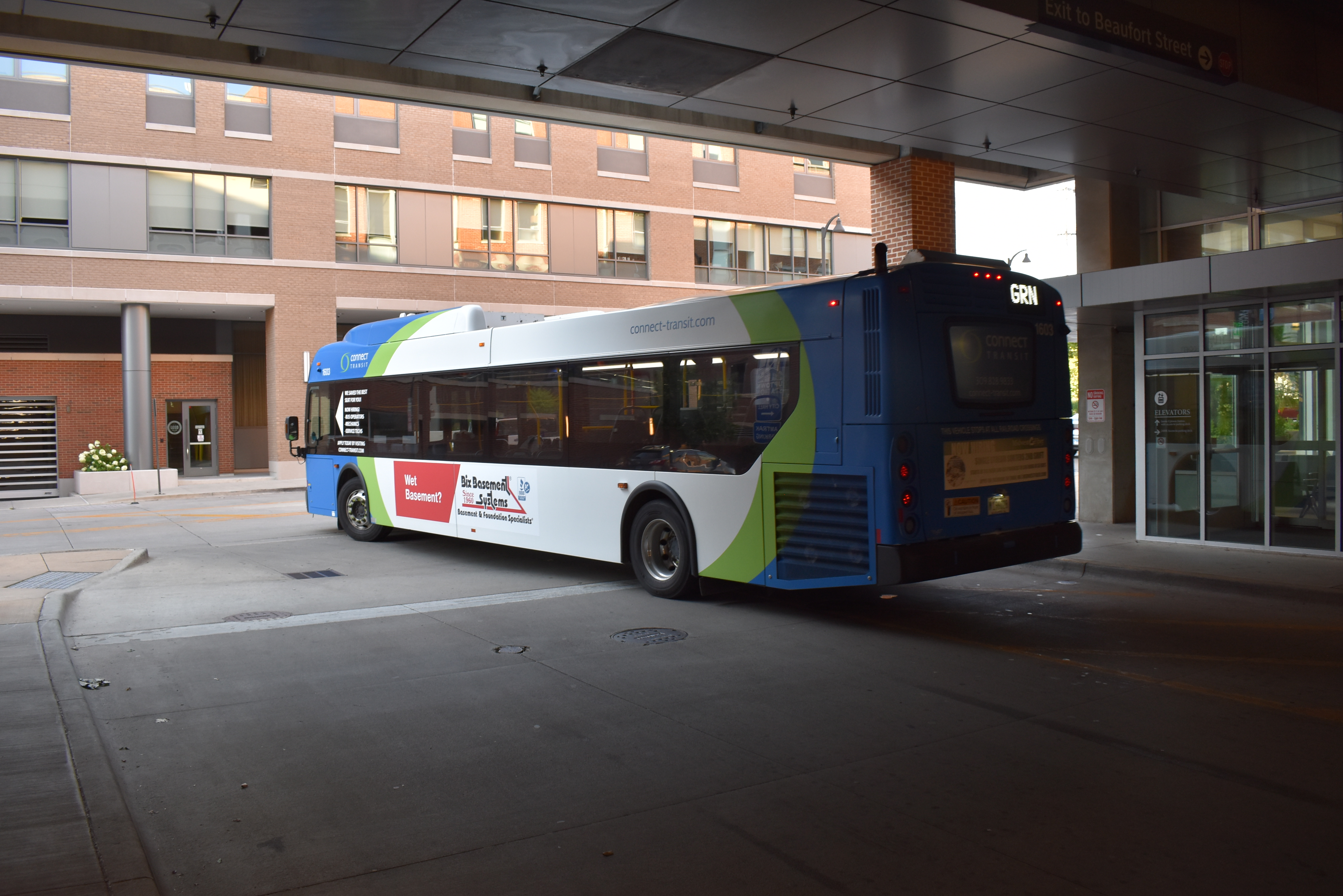
Connect Transit bus

The Central Illinois Regional Airport (ICAO KBMI) is on Route 9 in Bloomington, approximately five miles (8 km) east-southeast from Uptown Normal. The airport is served by four airlines, five rental car agencies, and has direct daily flights to Atlanta, Chicago, and Dallas-Ft. Worth. A record 559,481 passengers flew to or from CIRA in 2010.

=== Transit ===
Connect Transit has 16 color-coded fixed routes within the Bloomington–Normal urban area; a lift-assisted paratransit service called Connect Mobility; and a campus shuttle for ISU called Redbird Express, which operates when Illinois State University is in session. Since July 2025, Connect GO provides demand-response transit service connecting to rural McLean County.

=== Rail ===
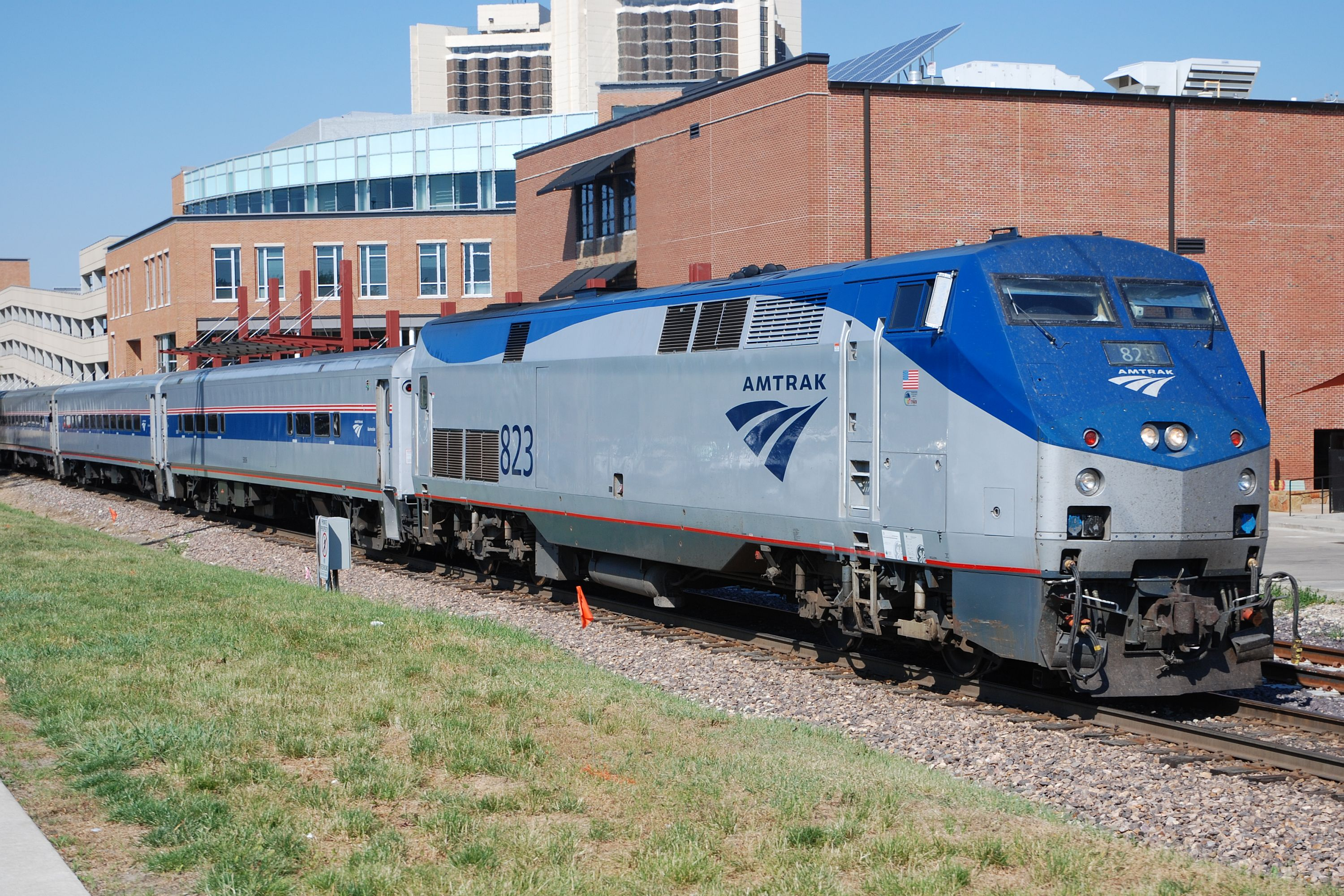
Amtrak Lincoln Service train at Uptown Station

The Bloomington-Normal Amtrak station, known as Uptown Station, is located at 11 Uptown Circle. It was designed by RATIO Architects. The station is served daily by four Lincoln Service trains in each direction between Chicago and St. Louis, with one roundtrip continuing on to Kansas City, Mo from St. Louis as the Missouri River Runner. There is also one Texas Eagle in each direction between San Antonio and Chicago. Three days a week, the Texas Eagle continues on to Los Angeles with the Sunset Limited. The station also serves connecting bus service to Peoria and Amtrak stations in Galesburg and Champaign-Urbana. It is Illinois' third-busiest Amtrak station after Chicago and Champaign-Urbana's Illinois Terminal, servicing about 92,000 passengers in fiscal year 2021. Traveling to Bloomington-Normal by Amtrak is a two-and-a-half-hour ride from St. Louis and Chicago.

== Notable people ==
- Andrew Bacevich, historian and author; born in Normal
- Edna Dean Baker, educator and college president; born in Normal
- Keita Bates-Diop, professional basketball player in the National Basketball Association (NBA), 2018–2024
- Wally Bishop, cartoonist; born in Normal
- Jon Bowermaster, oceans expert, journalist, filmmaker, and adventurer; born in Normal
- Eleanor Coen, artist; born in Normal
- Ellen Crawford, actress; born in Normal
- Jim Crews, college basketball head coach
- Pop Dillon, professional baseball player in Major League Baseball (MLB), 1899–1904; born in Normal
- Robert B. Duncan, US congressman from Oregon
- Colton Dunn, comedian, actor, and writer, notable for his work on Key & Peele
- Kevin Eggan, professor of molecular biology at Harvard University; born in Normal
- Robert S. Ellwood, expert on world religions; born in Normal
- Carrie Etter, poet; residing in the UK since 2001
- Jeff Fowler, director
- Richard Godfrey, mayor of Normal (1976–1985)
- Jesse Hibbs, film director and college football star; born in Normal
- Richard Hovey, poet; born in Normal
- Michael Jantze, comic book author; raised in Normal
- Pokey LaFarge, American roots & blues musician and singer, spent teenage years in Normal
- Ryan Martinie, bassist; raised in Normal
- Ralph Eugene Meatyard, photographer; born in Normal
- Ogonna Nnamani, member of the US Olympic volleyball team; born in Normal
- Andrew Osenga, musician and songwriter
- Awadagin Pratt, musician; raised in Normal
- Gordon Ropp, Illinois state representative and farmer; born in Normal
- Roger Sedarat, poet; born in Normal
- Duke Slater, professional football player in the NFL, 1922–1931; first Black lineman in NFL history; member of both College Football Hall of Fame and Pro Football Hall of Fame
- McLean Stevenson, actor; born in Normal
- Brock Stewart, professional baseball player in MLB; born in Normal
- Robert C. Underwood, Chief Justice of the Illinois Supreme Court; lived in Normal
- David Foster Wallace, award-winning author, professor at Illinois State University in Normal (1993–2002)

== In popular culture ==
- The chorus of "I Got High" by Clem Snide (The Meat of Life, 429 Records) includes the lyrics:

"I got high with a Sufjan Stevens fan in Normal, Illinois
And this song goes out to all you beautiful
American girls and boys"

- "Normal" by Big Country (Restless Natives & Rarities, 1998)
- Way to Normal by Ben Folds (2008)

== Sister cities ==
- (United States) Bloomington, Illinois
