= Connect Transit =

Bus system operator in Illinois, US

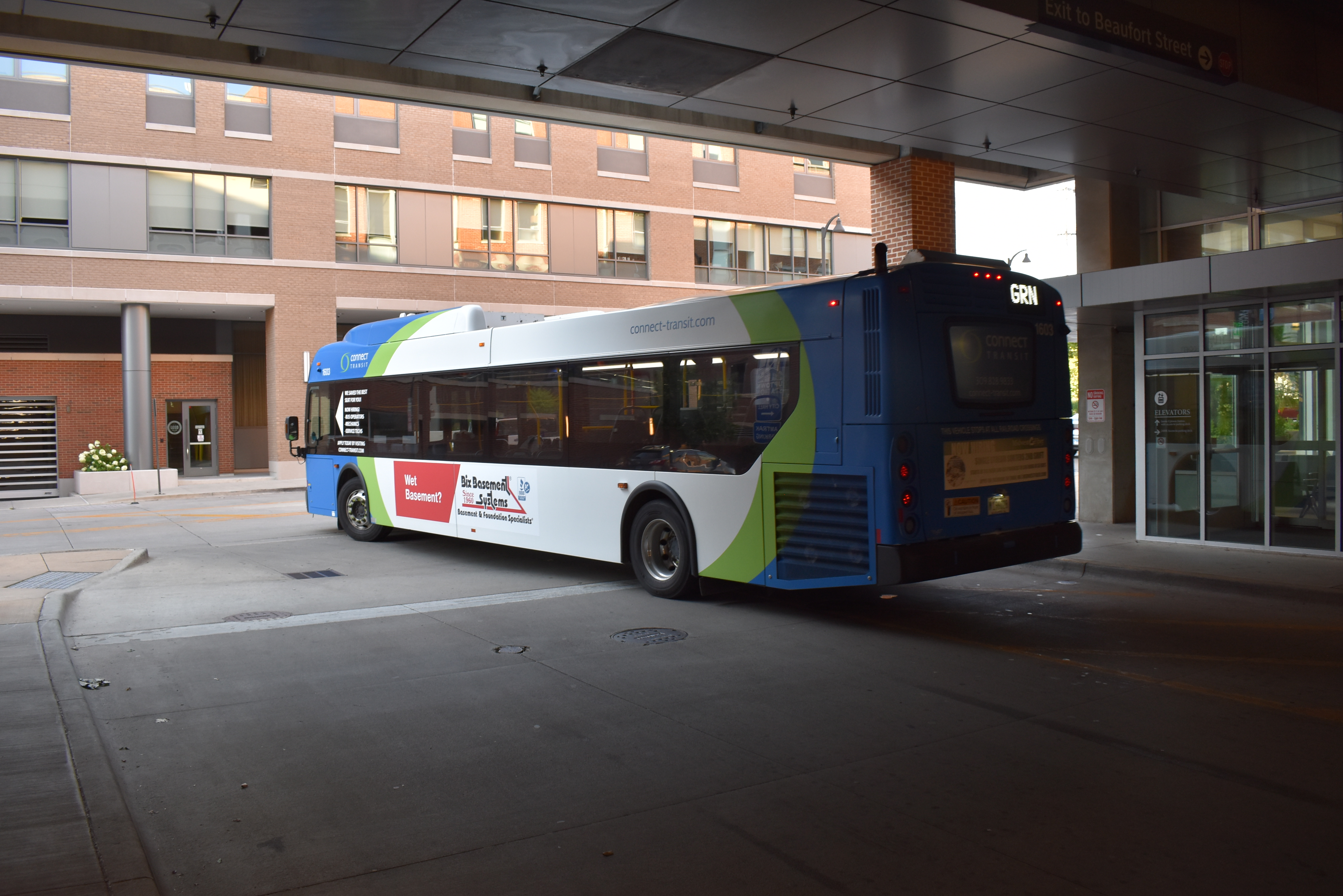
- A bus leaving Uptown Station in 2022
- Formerly: Bloomington-Normal Public Transit System
- Founded: 1972
- Headquarters: 351 Wylie Dr.
- Locale: Bloomington–Normal, Illinois
- Service area: McLean County, Illinois
- Service type: bus service, paratransit
- Routes: 16
- Stations: Uptown Station
- Fleet: 44 Transit, 27 Demand Response
- Daily ridership: 6,700 (weekdays, Q2 2026)
- Annual ridership: 2,285,700 (2025)
- Fuel type: Diesel, Electric, Propane
- Chief executive: Brady Lange
- Website: connect-transit.com

Connect Transit, is the name that Bloomington-Normal Public Transit System ,is doing business as, and is the primary public transit provider Bloomington–Normal, Illinois. The system consists of 16 fixed routes including the Illinois State University Redbird Express. In 2025, the system had a ridership of 2,285,700, or about 6,700 per weekday as of the second quarter of 2026.

Unlike other transit systems in downstate Illinois, Connect Transit is not a mass transit district. Rather it is an intergovernmental agency of the City of Bloomington and Town of Normal. In 2025, the Bloomington City Council and Normal Town Council approved resolutions allowing Connect Transit to operate beyond it boundaries. The resolution will allow the McLean County Government to establish its own intergovernmental agreement with Connect Transit to operate service in the rural parts of the County. On July 1, 2025, Connect Transit launched Connect GO, a demand-response service dedicated to serving rural McLean County.

== History ==
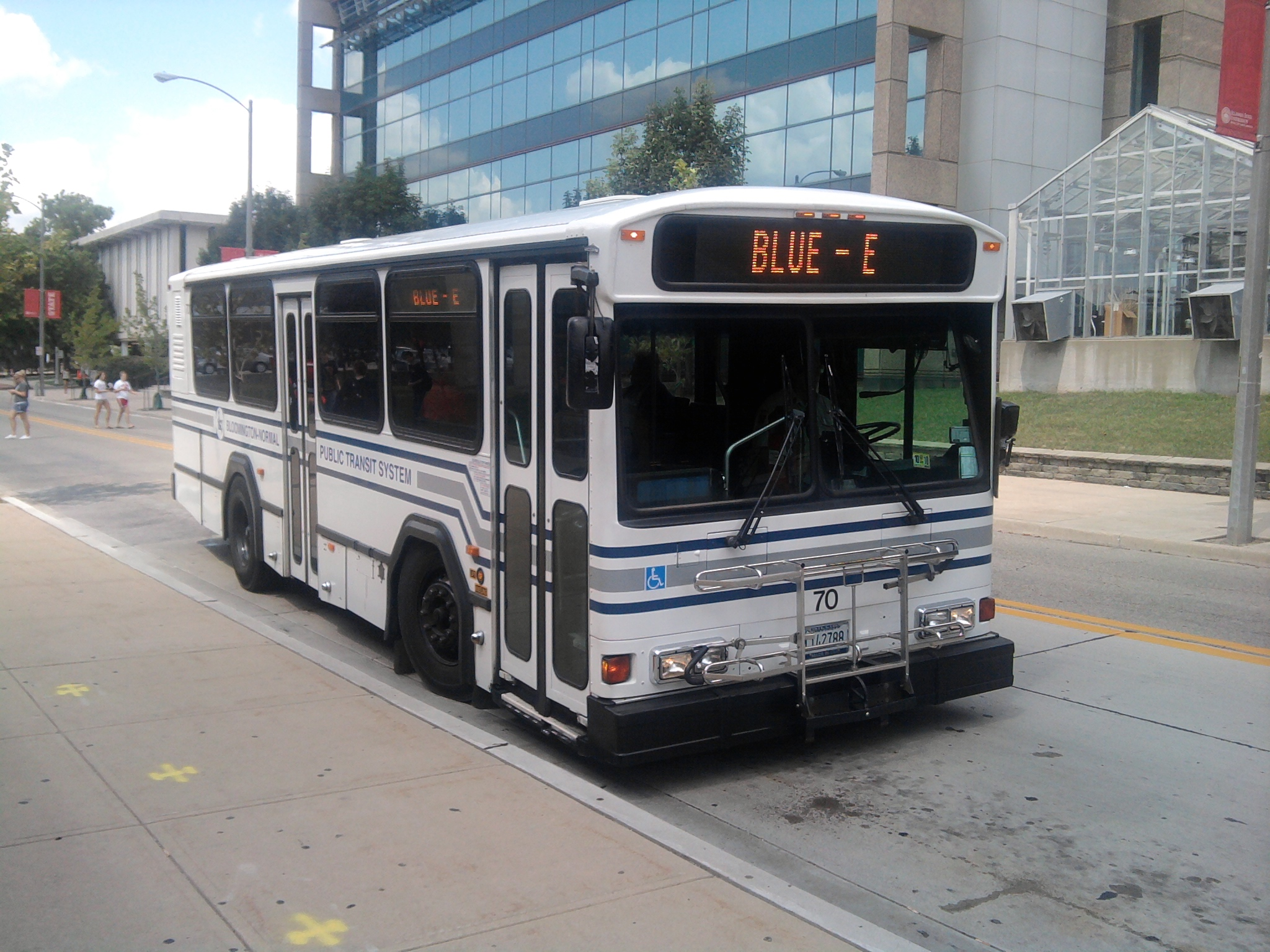
Gillig Phantom serving the Blue (E) route

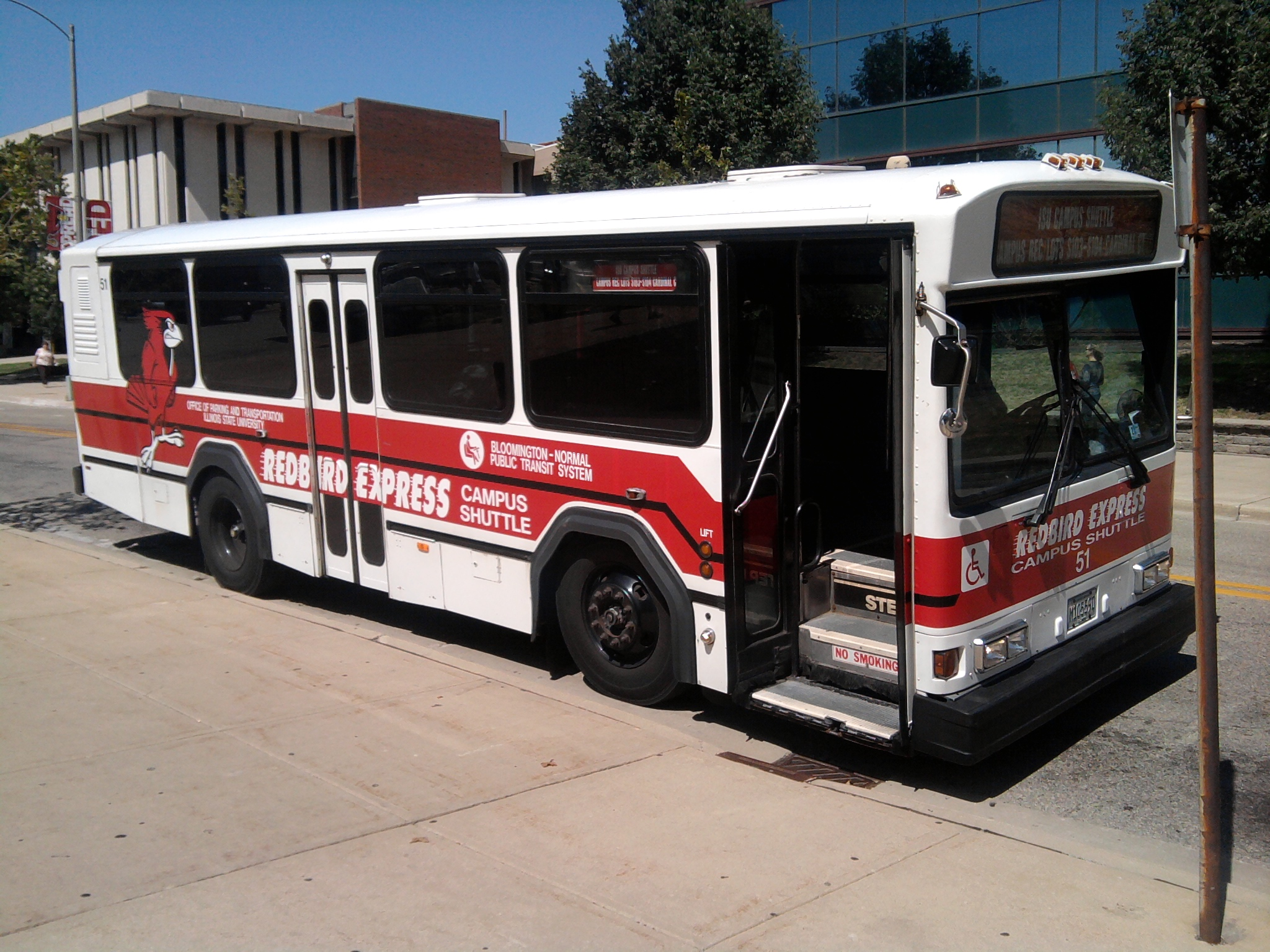
Gillig Phantom serving the Redbird Express service

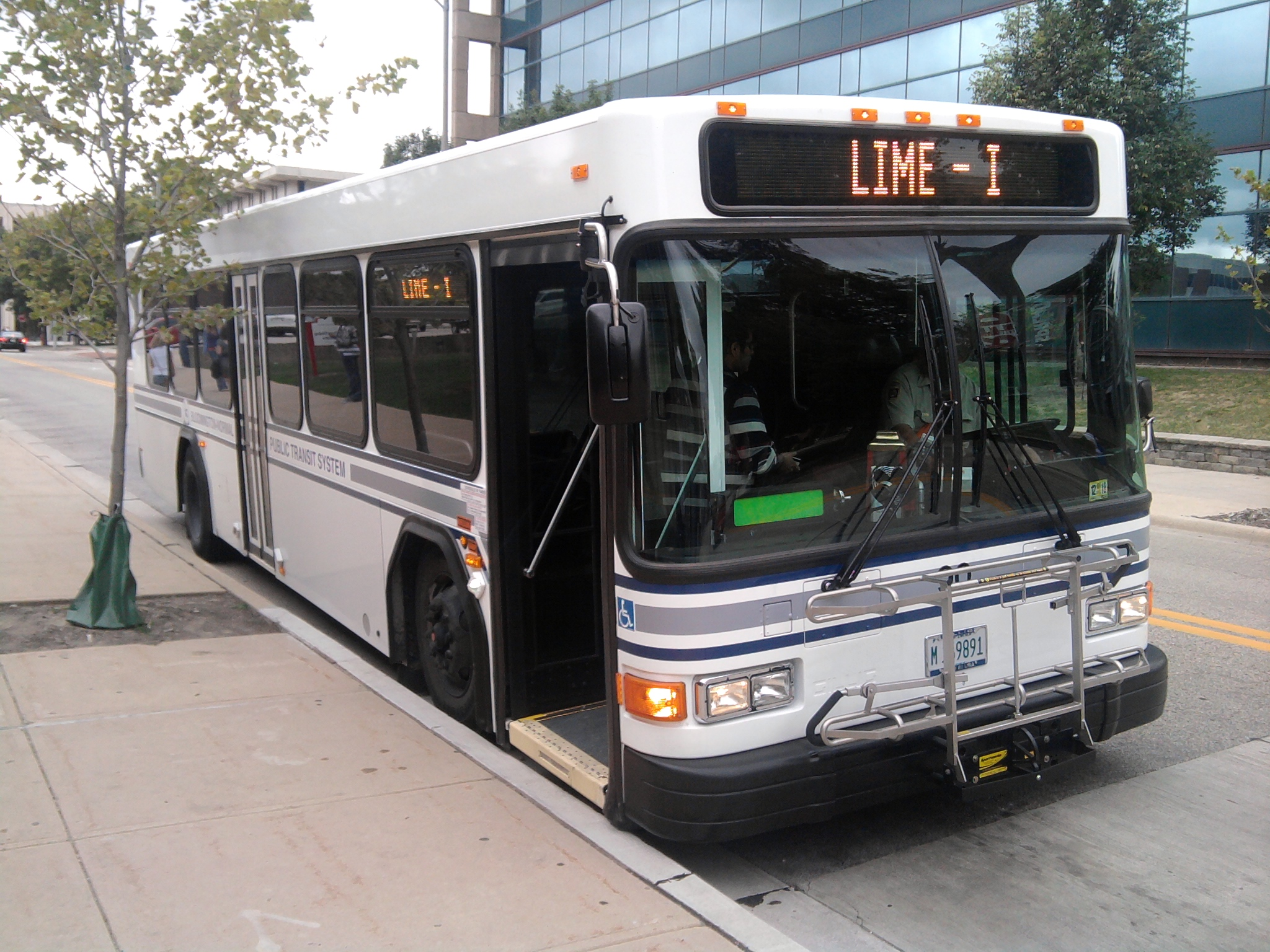
Gillig Low Floor serving the Lime (I) route

Until 1972, Bloomington-Normal was served by National City Lines. When the company left the region, the City of Bloomington and Town of Normal established an intergovernmental agency known as the Bloomington Normal Public Transit System, via intergovernmental agreement. The transit system operates as an independent agency governed by a board appointed by both the City of Bloomington and Town of Normal.

== Routes ==
Connect Transit's buses run every 15, 30, or 60 minutes, depending on the route, time of day, and day of the week. Service is offered in the day and evening hours daily, although hours are reduced on weekends. Buses do not operate on New Year's Day, Memorial Day, Independence Day, Labor Day, Thanksgiving, or Christmas. Basic adult fare is $1.25 with free transfers. 1, 7, or 30 day bus passes are available.

Connect Transit has two main transfer centers. Uptown Station, located in Normal, is also served by Amtrak and by intercity buses. Eight routes have one terminus here. The other transfer center is two miles to the south, in downtown Bloomington on Front Street across from the McLean County Law & Justice Center. Nine routes have one terminus here. The Green, Red, and Lime routes serve both locations.

A new Downtown Bloomington Transit Center is being planned to replace the existing Front Street location. It will be located at the city-owned Market Street Parking Garage (which is expected to be demolished) three blocks north of the current site. Officials expect the new facility to open in late 2026 or early 2027.

The Olive route that ran along Normal's north side was eliminated on July 1, 2019, due to low ridership.

Beginning in August 2026, Connect Transit plans to launch two new routes. One route will connect ISU's main campus in Normal with its new engineering campus in east Bloomington along General Electric Road and is expected to have 20 minute headways on weekdays and 30 minute headways on weekends. The other new route will connect Heartland Community College's Normal campus with its campus in Pontiac in neighboring Livingston County. It will have three daily departures from Monday through Thursday and make stops in Towanda, Lexington, and Chenoa

Route List

Route Name	Northern/Western Terminus	Southern/Eastern Terminus	Interval (min)
Aqua	Downtown Bloomington	Greyhound & Southgate	60 mins
Blue	Shoppes at College Hills	Downtown Bloomington	60 mins 30 mins (Peak hour)
Brown	Bloomington Walmart	Uptown Station	60 mins
Gold	Carle BroMenn	Downtown Bloomington	60 mins
Green	Uptown Station	Downtown Bloomington	15 mins or 30 mins (weekend)
Lime	Uptown Station	Downtown Bloomington	30 mins
Orange	Downtown Bloomington	Hamilton Rd & State Farm Plaza	60 mins
Pink	School St & Northfield Dr	Uptown Station	30 mins or 60 mins (Sundays)
Purple	Downtown Bloomington	Shoppes at College Hills	60 mins or 30 mins
Red	Uptown Station	Downtown Bloomington	30 mins
Mint	Normal Walmart	Shoppes at College Hills	30 Mins (Mon - Fri)
Redbird Express	Cardinal Court	Beaufort St & School St	5 - 7 mins (Peak hours) otherwise 20 mins
Sapphire	Rivian	Bloomington Walmart	60 mins
Silver	Bloomington Walmart	Downtown Bloomington	60 mins
Tan	Uptown Station	Central Illinois Regional Airport	60 mins
Yellow	Heartland Community College	Uptown Station	30 mins or 60 mins (Sundays)

== Connect FLEX ==
In July 2023, Connect Transit launched a new microtransit service branded as Connect FLEX. The service will primarily serve a zone in southwest Bloomington and have the same hours-of-operation as the fixed-route system. For continued travel outside the zone, Connect FLEX vehicles will drop off passengers at locations such downtown Bloomington or Bloomington Walmart to allow transfers to fixed-route system.

In order to ride, passengers need to download a dedicated mobile app or call a phone number in order to notify the nearest vehicle of their trip. The cost to ride is $1.

== Connect GO ==
On July 1, 2025, Connect Transit launched a new demand-response service branded as Connect GO. The new service will serve the rural areas of McLean County not served by the urban fixed-route system.

Connect GO replaces SHOW Bus as the public transportation provider for rural McLean County, which is a result of the McLean County Board's Executive Committee voting in June 2024 to withdraw from an intergovernmental agreement with other Central Illinois counties to provide public transportation through SHOW BUS.

Unlike the urban system, policy and oversight of Connect GO will be handled by the McLean County Board rather than the Connect Transit Board. The County Board will have a say over hours and days of operation, services provided, fare policy, and its budget. Funding for Connect GO will be made up of federal Section 5311 rural transit formula funds and IDOT Downstate Operating Assistance Program (DOAP) funds rather than revenues directly from the County.

Since its launch, Connect GO has been fare-free. Connect Transit has proposed instituting a $4 one-way fare for in-county trips and $8 one-way fare for out-of-county trips, but the proposal was rejected by the McLean County Board in July 2026 and is expected to undergo revisions.

== Fleet ==
=== Transit ===
Fleet number(s)	Model Year(s)	Manufacturer	Model	Length	Engine	Transmission	Notes
309 (1 bus) retiring	2003	New Flyer	D40LF	40 feet (12 m)	Cummins ISC	ZF 5HP592C	Ex-Champaign–Urbana Mass Transit District, purchased in September 2017.; 310 is retrofitted with a waiting room area in the back (seats 13), two booths for meeting space (seats 8), a television and a DVD player. It is known as the #GetConnected Community Bus and it was debuted in 2018 with the goal of utilizing the bus to hold voter registration drives, fresh food markets, reading literacy nights, mobile pop-up museums and more.; 311 & 310 were auctioned in June 2026.
1001 (1 buses)	2010	Gillig	Low Floor	35 feet (11 m)	Cummins ISL9 EPA10	Allison B400R	Numbered 90 prior to rebranding as Connect Transit.
1101–1104 (4 buses)	2011	Gillig	Low Floor	35 feet (11 m)	Cummins ISL9 EPA10	Allison B400R	96-99 prior to rebranding as Connect Transit.
1002-1004 (3 buses)	2010	New Flyer	D40LFR	40 feet (12 m)	Cummins ISL9 EPA10	Allison B400R	Ex-Milwaukee County Transit System, purchased in 2022.
1105-1116 (12 buses)	2011	New Flyer	DE40LFR	40 feet (12 m)	Cummins ISL9 EPA10	Allison H 40 EP hybrid system	Ex-Champaign–Urbana Mass Transit District, purchased in 2025.
1501-1505 (5 buses)	2015	New Flyer	XD40	40 feet (12 m)	Cummins ISL9 EPA13	Allison B400R	
1601-1607 (7 buses)	2016	New Flyer	XD40	40 feet (12 m)	Cummins ISL9 EPA13	Allison B400R	
1801-1805 (5 buses)	2017	New Flyer	XD40	40 feet (12 m)	Cummins L9 EPA17	Allison B400R	
1806-1810 (5 buses)	2018	New Flyer	XD40	40 feet (12 m)	Cummins L9 EPA17	Allison B400R	

| rowspan="5" | Gillig | rowspan="5" | Gillig Buus rapid transit(BRT) | rowspan="3" |Cummins L9 EPA17 | rowspan="3" | Allison Transmission Allison B400R | Rowspan="3" | |- align="center"

== Demand Response ==
Fleet number(s)	Model Year(s)	Manufacturer	Model	Length	Engine	Notes
1701–1704 (4 buses)	2017	Ford Champion	E450 LF Transport	26 feet (7.9 m)	Propane	
181-189 (9 buses)	2018	Ford Starcraft	E450 Allstar	21 feet (6.4 m)	Ford Modular 6.8L V10 Gasoline	
201-206 (6 buses)	2020	Ford Elkhart	E450 EC II	21 feet (6.4 m)	Ford Godzilla 7.3L V8 Gasoline	
231-233 (3 buses)		Ford Starcraft	E450	21 feet (6.4 m)	Gasoline	
22001-22005		Braunability Ram	ProMaster 3500		Gasoline	

== Fixed Route Ridership ==
The ridership statistics shown here are of fixed route services only and do not include demand response.

== See also ==
- List of bus transit systems in the United States
- Uptown Station
