= Scott–Vrooman House =

Historic house in Illinois, United States

- Vrooman Mansion
- U.S. National Register of Historic Places
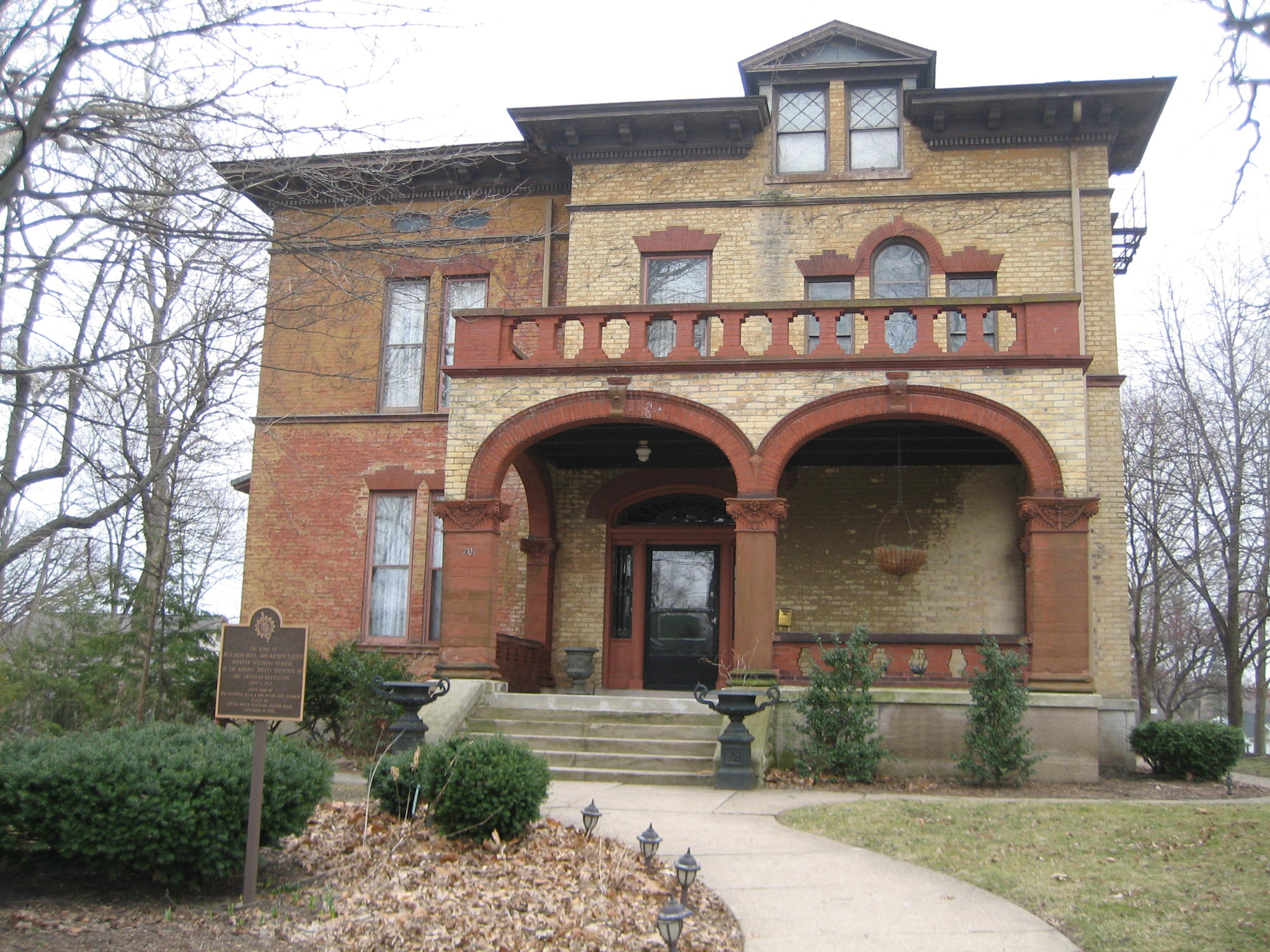
- Bed & Breakfast and Special Events Venue

- Location within Illinois Location within the United States
- Location: 701 E. Taylor St., Bloomington, Illinois
- Coordinates: 40°28′39″N 88°59′1″W
- Area: 1 acre (0.40 ha)
- Built: 1869
- Architect: Bunting, G. W.; Pillsbury, Arthur
- Architectural style: Italianate, Romanesque
- NRHP reference No.: 83000330
- Added to NRHP: August 18, 1983

The Scott–Vrooman House is a historic home in Bloomington, Illinois. The building was added to the National Register of Historic Places in 1983. It was the site of speeches from Abraham Lincoln and Stephen A. Douglas.

== Ownership History ==
The house was built in 1869 by Eli Barber. Due to his wife's death, he never lived in the home. He sold the completed home to Matthew T. and Julia Green Scott who moved in sometime in 1872. They had two daughters: Letitia and Julia Scott Vrooman who later married Carl Schurz Vrooman. Matthew died in 1891. In 1900, Julia Green Scott worked with architect Arthur Pillsbury to design an addition for the home which included the parlor, foyer, north facing porch and stained-glass windows. The house was also used as a hospital during the Flu Pandemic of 1918-1919.

Julia Green Scott died in 1923. Her daughter Julia Scott Vrooman continued to live in the home with her husband Carl. During World War II, they sectioned off the third floor of the house as apartments for soldiers and their families. After Julia Scott Vrooman's death, most of the contents of the home were sold at public auction and donated. The historic home then had two subsequent owners who used it as their private residence until it was purchased in 1995 and turned into a bed and breakfast.

== The Scott Family ==
Matthew T. Scott was a significant local businessman and developer who helped found the town of Chenoa, Illinois in 1855. His family had purchased large amounts of land in both Ohio and Illinois in the 1830s, including in Chenoa, IL. This land was particularly valuable because two railroads, the Chicago and Alton and the Toledo, Peoria and Warsaw, intersected there.

Matthew Scott helped found the town of Chenoa in 1855 as an agricultural and commercial center for his business activities. He soon began buying thousands of acres of land and eventually accumulated over 45,000 acres of land in Illinois, Iowa, and Tennessee. He used funds from the sale of land to develop the best of his land holdings: 5,000 acres of land in northern McLean County and southern Livingston County. This land was prairie and very fertile and favorable to growing corn.

In 1867, Matthew T Scott founded the McLean County Coal Company with Adlai E. Stevenson I, who married Julia Green Scott's sister Letitia. McLean County Coal Company was the most successful coal mine in McLean County, and was later run by Julia Green Scott after Matthew's death. Though Matthew and Julia lived in Chenoa at the beginning of their marriage, they moved to Springfield, Illinois in 1870 before settling in Bloomington in 1872.

After Matthew's death in 1891, Julia became a prominent businesswoman and community leader; her accomplishments included serving as president of the McLean County Coal Company. The couple's daughter, Julia Scott Vrooman, married Carl Schurz Vrooman, who was Assistant Secretary of Agriculture under President Woodrow Wilson.

== The Green Family ==
Julia Green Scott was born on February 14, 1839, in Danville, Kentucky. She was the daughter or Presbyterian Reverend Lewis W. Green (1806–1863), the head of Centre College in Danville, Kentucky, and Mary Peachy Fry, a descendant of surveyor and adventurer Joshua Fry. She was a direct decent from the family of George Washington on both sides.Her great-grandfather was James Speed, a captain in the Revolutionary War. She attended a finishing school in New York. With her connections to the revolutionary war, her and her sister played an integral role in the early growth of the National Society of the Daughters of the Revolution. Julia served as the 7th National president of NSDAR from 1909 to 1913, while her sister Letitia was the 3rd president of the organization.

Julia's younger sister, Letitia Green Stevenson,(1843-1913) married Adlai Ewing Stevenson I, who served as the Vice President of the United States to President Grover Cleveland.

After Matthew Scott's death in 1891, Julia Green Scott took charge of managing 10,000 acres of farmland in Illinois and Indiana as well as being the principal stockholder, and eventually president, of the McLean County Coal Company. As one of the largest landowners in IL with 10,000 acres of farmland and an advocate of conservation, Julia sent 40 of her tenant farmers to the University of Illinois College of Agriculture to acquaint them with new and advanced methods in farming. It was a huge success for the farmers as well as the university. Her activity with NSDAR continued, where she was president of the War Relief Committee for the N.S.D.A.R. during World War I. She led the crusade to raise money for the benefit of French war orphans. Her efforts were acknowledged in 1921 when the French ambassador, M. Jusserand, presented Julia with The Medal of French Gratitude of the First Class in recognition of her work raising money to rehabilitate the French town of Tilloloy and the adoption of 4,000 war orphans. This was the last time Julia Scott appeared in public. Julia Green Scott died in 1923.

== The Vrooman Family ==
Julia Scott Vrooman, the second daughter of Julia Green Scott and Matthew T. Scott, was born in 1876 at the Scott-Vrooman house. She grew up in the home, and in 1894 while traveling in Europe, she met Carl Schurz Vrooman (1872-1966). On December 28, 1896, Carl and Julia were wed at the home of her sister Letitia Scott Bromwell in St. Louis, Missouri. They returned to Europe in 1897 and spent a great deal of time traveling through Switzerland, France, and Germany. They never had any children. Both known for their writing, Julia and Carl co-authored a book on travel titled The Lure and Lore of Travel (1914), which gained some public attention.

Julia, who was very interested and active in philanthropic work, decided that she wanted to help with the war effort more she was on the home front. She wanted to get directly involved in war work in Europe and decided to accompany Carl on his forthcoming trip to Europe. Carl was being sent to Europe by President Wilson as a member of a special Presidential Commission whose goal was to help solve the agricultural problems of the Allied nations during World War I. Beginning on August 23, 1918, until late 1919, she worked for the Young Men's Christian Association (YMCA) with American soldiers at the front. As part of her work with the Y.M.C.A., Julia formed a jazz band of soldiers of the American army of occupation in Europe to entertain and improve the morale of the troops in France, Germany, and Belgium. After the performances, she would frequently hold a dinner for the soldiers where she and her band entertained. She often provided the food from her own supplies or bought food with her own money. Julia would also hold “cocoa parties” to help Illinois soldiers fight against homesickness. For her efforts to keep the troops’ morale high during the war, in 1921 Julia was made an honorary member of the John H. Kraus Post of the Veterans of Foreign Wars in Bloomington.

The couple had a very deep religious faith and were active members of Second Presbyterian Church in Bloomington. Carl was a member of the original Lions Club of Bloomington, an honorary vice-president for life of the McLean County Historical Society. He belonged to the Masons and the Order of the Eastern Star, was elected president of the Community Players Theater in 1923, and served as public relations and information chairman of the McLean County chapter of the American Red Cross in 1947, among other things. Julia was an active member of the Federation of Women's Club and was elected president of the 17th District Federation of Women's Clubs in 1922. She also continued her philanthropic work and played the role of hostess during the many parties she and Carl held at their mansion on Taylor Street. She and Carl often opened up their home up to the community. Many formal dances of Illinois Wesleyan University fraternities and sororities and tea parties were held at their home. Together Julia and Carl had many friends, some through his role as Assistant Secretary of Agriculture. This included President Woodrow Wilson & Mrs. Edith Wilson, President Franklin Roosevelt & Mrs. Eleanor Roosevelt, Adlai Stevenson II, William Jennings Bryan, many European Heads of State, playwright Rachel Crothers, poets Sara Teasdale and Vachel Lindsay. Most of whom dined at the original dining room table which is still in use at the Vrooman Mansion Bed and Breakfast today. Julia was also famous for the ‘Vrooman bread’, which she sent to the Queen of England, Eleanor Roosevelt, and other dignitaries.

Julia died at the age of 104. Her will cited 118 beneficiaries of her estate that was estimated as being worth $1.5 million in personal property and $2.75 million in real estate. She was buried next to her husband and other members of her family in Evergreen Memorial Cemetery in Bloomington.

Carl Schurz Vrooman (October 25, 1872 - April 8, 1966) attended Washburn College in Topeka, Kansas from about 1890 to 1891. He also studied at Harvard University in Massachusetts for about three years. He then studied abroad at Oxford University in England for a few months. Carl combined his passion for writing, agriculture, science and politics to improve farming, educate farmers and help them run farms as a business. Locally he helped encourage the concept of crop rotation, and used his agricultural knowledge to help during World War I overseas. Carl was the Assistant United States Secretary of Agriculture under Woodrow Wilson and started the victory garden campaign during World War I. This interest in agriculture began through his years as Regent of the Kansas State Agricultural College from 1898 to 1900. His later marriage to Julia Scott brought with it the large Chenoa farm holdings which had been owned by Julia's father Matthew. Carl became a manager of some of the Scott land holdings and because of this, delved even further into scientific writings and consulted agricultural experts. He referred to himself as a “dirt farmer” and farmed or managed his mother-in-law's tenant farms throughout the Midwest, especially in McLean County.

As the Assistant Secretary of Agriculture, one of his first tasks was touring the country as a spokesman for agriculture and promoting the latest research on the topic. Carl believed that farming should be conducted scientifically and just as importantly, as a business. By this he did not simply mean bookkeeping, but felt that farmers needed to organize for both economic and political advantages. He pushed the importance of marketing as the key to the success of agriculture. As a part of this he promoted the Smith-Lever Act (1914) that was meant to help farmers across the nation. It established a national cooperative extension service that extended outreach programs through land grant universities (such as the University of Illinois in Champaign-Urbana) to educate rural Americans about advances in agricultural practices and technology which would help farmers increase productivity. It also brought the Department of Agriculture in actual personal touch with farmers throughout the country by establishing county offices with local agents that could assist famers with individual problems. In Carl's opinion, this was “agricultural learning democratized, made practical, and given to farmers of the country without money and without price.”

At the same meeting, Carl also explained why farmers of the country needed better credit as badly as they needed agricultural and economic science. He stated that the current banking system in place was built up to satisfy the financial needs of urban communities with little or no special provisions for the needs of the agricultural interests of this country. Farmers needed more than 90 days worth of credit, which was of particularly no use to the “farmer who wants to change his system from grain to livestock.” To Carl, the improvement of agriculture affected everyone and benefited everyone.

Additionally, Carl urged communities to improve their roads because the “good roads movement is important to our financial well-being, to our pleasure, and of more importance to the standard of civilization.” To Carl, good roads encourage farmers and other rural residents to come into town. And when they come into town, they spend money. With good roads, productivity increases because a farmer bringing his crop to market can take bigger loads (thus making fewer trips), get there quicker, and get back to work. With poor roads, the farmer has to cut down his load, wears out his team, and wastes time. Therefore, it is in the best interest of everyone to improve the roads. Through his travels across the country, Carl learned that there was a need to put the results of the new agricultural research in a language that the typical farmer could understand and apply to his own operations. To meet this need, he published several pamphlets and books aimed at regular farmers in the hopes that it would help them understand the changing technologies and also help them get the most out of their farms. In 1916, he wrote a pamphlet called Grain Farming in the Corn Belt with Live Stock as a Side Line. Methods such as raising livestock, using lime to fertilize the soil, and crop rotation were listed. Vrooman was pretty hard on traditional farmers who simply relied on the weather and planted grain year after year. He accused them of mortgaging the future of their children by their shortsighted ideas. On his own land he demanded that his tenants plant alfalfa as a means of recharging the soil. If they ignored this, they found themselves put off the land. This pamphlet was so simply written and in such demand that nearly one million copies were printed and distributed across the country.

After the war, Carl was chosen by the American Farm Bureau to head a relief mission to Europe. He was charged with the collection, processing, and shipment of nearly a million bushels of corn to the starving European nations of Austria, Poland, and Czechoslovakia as a gift from American farmers. For these efforts, the Polish government decorated him.

== See also ==
- Lincoln Oak
