= Julia Scott (disambiguation) =

Julia Scott is a Canadian-American writer and journalist.

Julia Scott may also refer to:

- Julia H. Scott (1809–1842), American writer
- Julia Green Scott (1839–1923), American socialite, philanthropist, businesswoman, and landowner
- Julia Ralph Scott (born 1982), Scottish footballer
- Julia Scott Vrooman (1876–1981), née Scott, American writer, philanthropist, and socialite
- Mary Alicia Owen (1850–1935), American author and folklore collector, used the pseudonym Julia Scott

== See also ==
- Julie Scott (disambiguation)
