= Carl Schurz Vrooman =

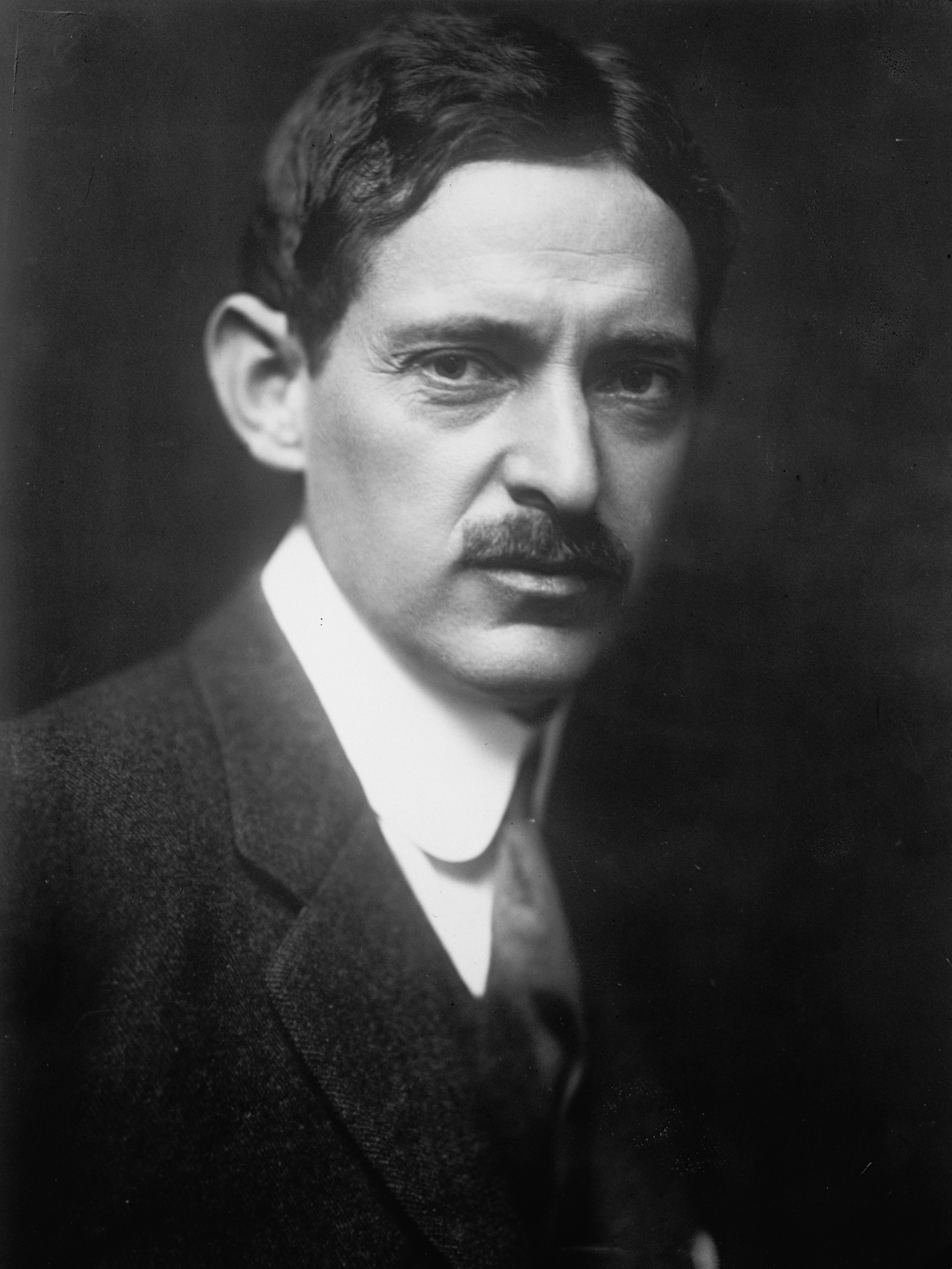

Assistant United States Secretary of Agriculture
- Appointed by: Woodrow Wilson

Personal details
- Born: October 5, 1872 Macon, Missouri
- Died: April 8, 1966 (aged 93) Bloomington, Illinois
- Spouse: Julia Scott Vrooman
- Parent(s): Hiram Perkins Vrooman; Sarah Buffington

Carl Schurz Vrooman (October 25, 1872 – April 8, 1966) was the Assistant United States Secretary of Agriculture under Woodrow Wilson. He started the victory garden campaign during World War I.

Vroomanwas born in Macon, Missouri, to Judge Hiram Perkins Vrooman and Sarah Buffington. Walter Vrooman was his elder brother. On December 28, 1896, he married Julia Green Scott, daughter of Matthew T. Scott and Julia Green, in Chenoa, Illinois. As Julia Scott's father had died, Adlai Stevenson I gave her away at their wedding.

He died on April 8, 1966, in Bloomington, Illinois. His papers are held at the Library of Congress.

== Works ==
- Carl Schurz Vrooman; Julia Scott Vrooman (1914). The Lure and the Lore of Travel. Sherman-French Publishers.
