= Walter Vrooman =

American socialist educator

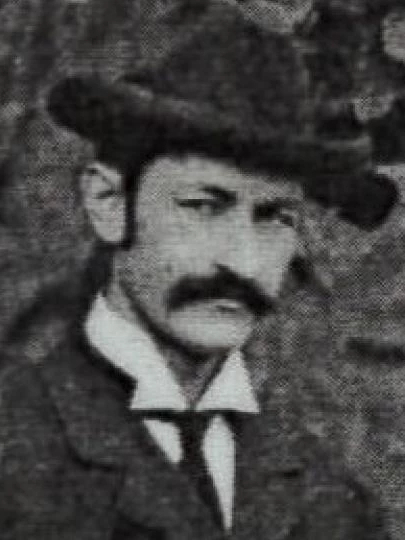
- Born: 1869; Macon, Missouri
- Died: 2 December 1909 (aged 39–40)
- Occupation: Educator

Walter Watkins Vrooman (1869 – 2 December 1909) was an American socialist educationalist who co-founded Ruskin College in Oxford with Charles A. Beard in 1899. He then returned to America, where he set up a second Ruskin College in Trenton, Missouri.

Walter was the son of Judge Hiram Perkins Vrooman and Sarah Buffington. Carl Schurz Vrooman was his younger brother. The family moved to Baltimore, Maryland, where another brother, Hiram Greeley Vrooman, joined the Associate Reformed Church and became a preacher. He also founded the Union for Public Good in conjunction with B. O. Flower.

Amne Grafflin was attracted to the Union for Public Good and accepted the position of secretary. She was the heiress to George W. Grafflin, who was a dry goods and fertilizer merchant. Shortly after her father died, Amne married Walter in February 1897.

== The Grafflin inheritance ==
George Grafflin had died intestate in November 1896. His estate was valued at between $600,000 and $1,000,000. Amne announced her proposed marriage to Vrooman in January 1897. Her brother William Grafflin was very upset by this. As Vrooman was living in St. Louis, where Amne would shortly join him, Amne agreed to give William power of attorney for her. As William had been a partner in the company with his deceased father, this was to enable him to deal with day-to-day issues of the company. However, after she moved to St. Louis, she regretted this decision, but when she attempted to have the power of attorney rescinded, the court refused to do so.

== Works ==
- Dynamic Religion, Baltimore: Patriotic Literature Publishing co. (1895)
- Government ownership in production and distribution: being an account of 337 now existing national and municipal undertakings in the 100 principal countries of the world, Baltimore: Patriotic Literature Publishing co. (1895)
- The New Democracy: A Handbook for Democratic Speakers and Workers, St Louis: Witt Printing Co. (1897)
