= Julia Scott Vrooman =

American writer (1876–1981)

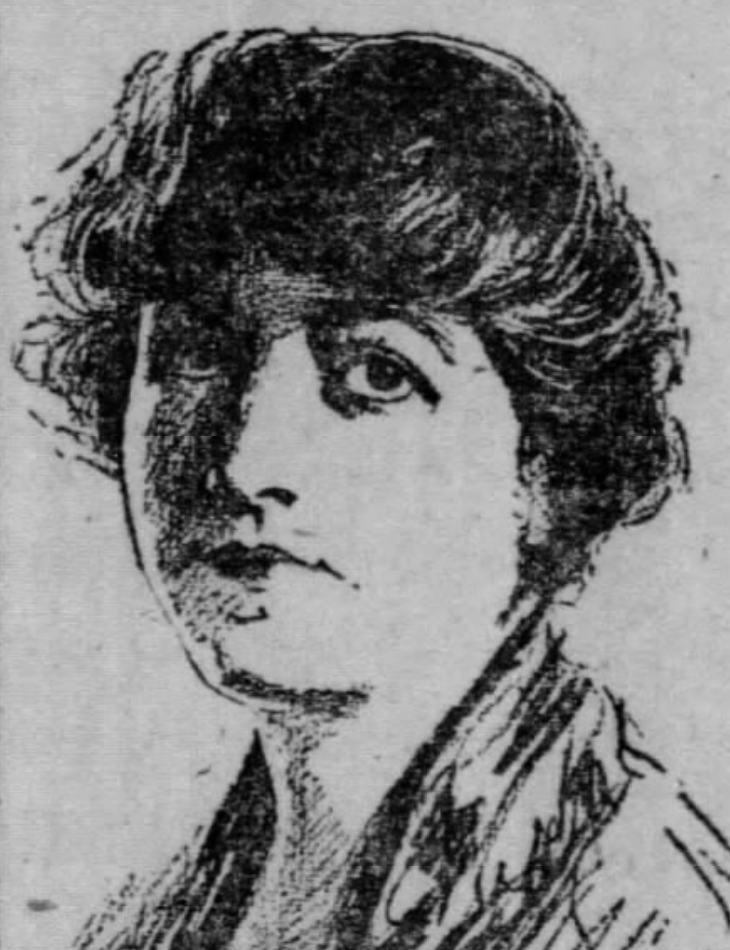
- Julia Scott Vrooman, from a 1924 newspaper
- Born: October 4, 1876; Bloomington, Illinois
- Died: May 30, 1981 (Age 104); Bloomington, Illinois
- Occupations: Writer, clubwoman, socialite
- Spouse: Carl Schurz Vrooman
- Parent(s): Matthew T. Scott; Julia Green

Julia Scott Vrooman (October 4, 1876 – May 30, 1981) was an American writer, philanthropist, and socialite.

== Early life ==
Julia Scott was born in Bloomington, Illinois, the daughter of Matthew T. Scott and Julia Green Scott. Her parents were socially prominent and wealthy; they owned the Scott–Vrooman House. Her mother was national president of the Daughters of the American Revolution (DAR). Vice-president Adlai Stevenson I was her uncle, married to Julia Green Scott's sister Letitia. She attended Chestnut Hill Boarding School, a girls' school near Philadelphia.

== Career ==
Vrooman and her husband were co-authors of The Lure and Lore of Travel (1914), and she wrote a political novel, The High Road to Honor (1924). She also wrote about travel in Century Magazine in 1906, The Arena in 1908, La Follette's Magazine in 1911, and The Twentieth Century Magazine in 1912.

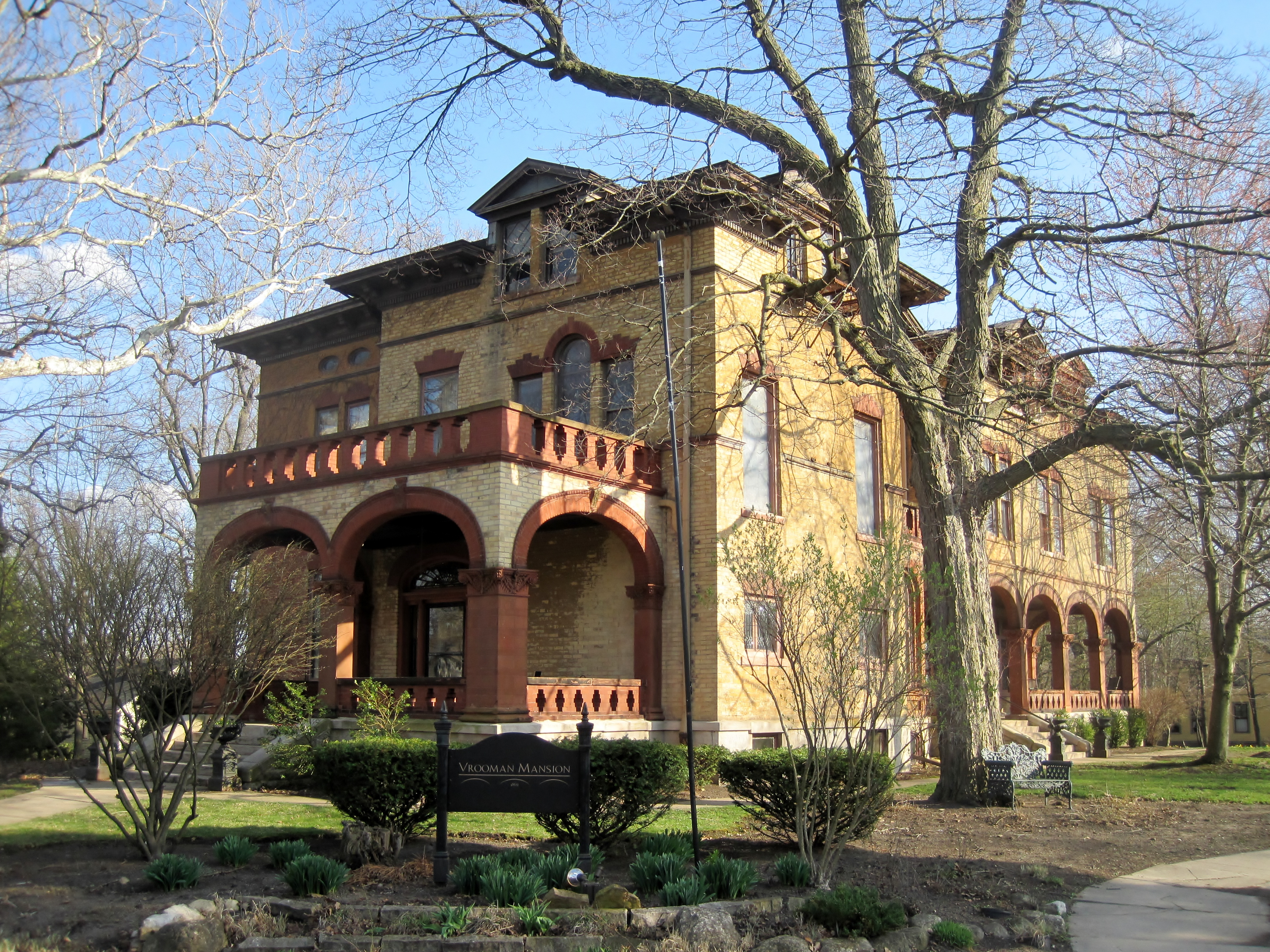
The Scott–Vrooman House, in Bloomington, Illinois; Julia Scott Vrooman was born in this house in 1876, and died in this house in 1981

Vrooman was a political hostess in Washington, D.C. During World War I, she accompanied her husband, a federal agriculture official, on a trip to Europe for coordinating food relief; she also worked with the YMCA serving American troops at the front. She formed a jazz band of musical soldiers, and often served cocoa to soldiers from Illinois in canteens. "I have no children, I am in perfect health," she explained of her efforts. "I am fortunate enough to be able to speak both French and Italian. If, instead of looking for an opportunity to get into war work, I were looking for an excuse to avoid it, I could not find one." For her contributions to troop morale, she was made an honorary member of the Veterans of Foreign Wars post in Bloomington.

Vrooman opened her home for a makeshift hospital during the 1918 influenza pandemic. She lectured on, and supported the founding of, the International Court of Justice. She organized a 1922 carnival to raise funds for Quaker war relief in Russia. She was active in the Illinois Federation of Women's Clubs. During World War II, she opened a floor of her large home for soldiers' apartments.

In addition to her literary and philanthropic pursuits, Vrooman was known for her whole wheat bread. She sold loaves at fundraising events. Poet Vachel Lindsay promised to write a sonnet to her bread, and Eleanor Roosevelt mentioned the bread in a newspaper column.

== Personal life ==
Julia Scott married Carl Schurz Vrooman in 1896. They were married for 69 years; Carl Vrooman died in 1966, and Julia Scott Vrooman died at home in 1981, aged 104 years. Her family's mansion in Chenoa was added to the National Register of Historic Places in 1983. Her Bloomington mansion has been a bed-and-breakfast inn in recent years.
