= Julie Scott =

Julie Scott may refer to:

- Julie Thu, American tennis player, competed for most of her career as Julie Scott
- Julie Scott (Rosicrucian)

== See also ==
- Julia Scott (disambiguation)
