= Letitia Stevenson =

Second Lady of the United States from 1893 to 1897

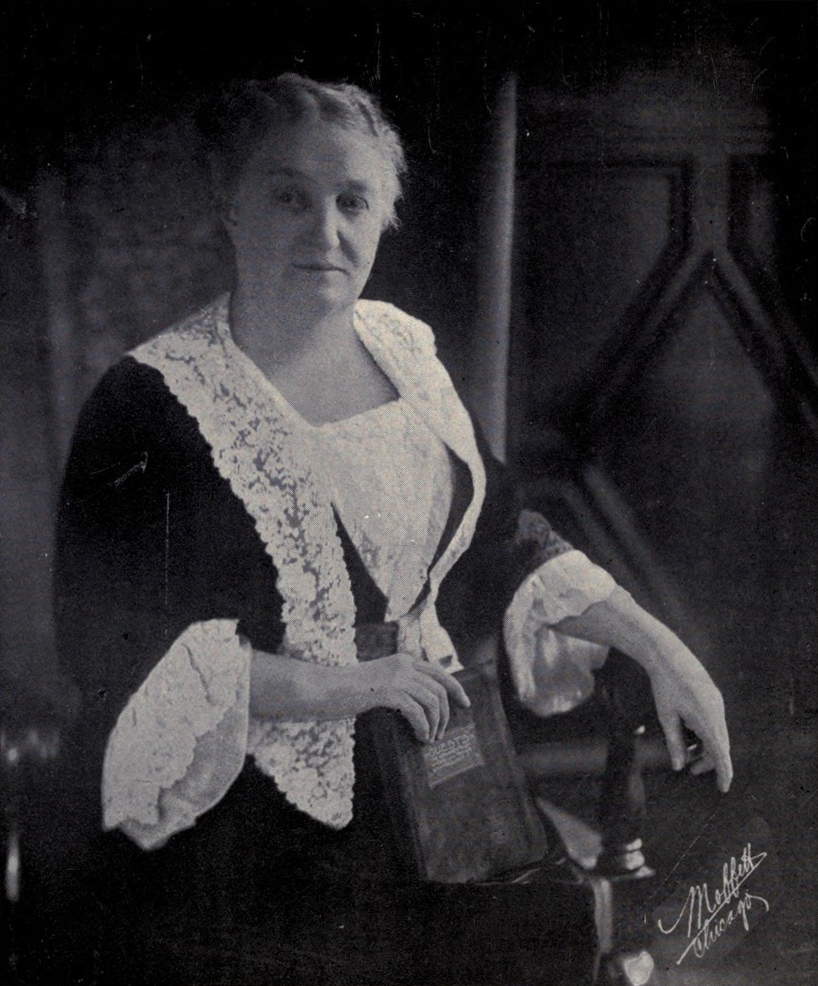

Second Lady of the United States
- In role March 4, 1893 – March 4, 1897
- Vice President: Adlai Stevenson I
- Preceded by: Anna Morton
- Succeeded by: Jennie Tuttle Hobart

President General of the National Society Daughters of the American Revolution
- In office 1896–1898
- Preceded by: Mary Parke Foster
- Succeeded by: Mary Fryer Manning
- In office 1893–1895
- Preceded by: Mary Virginia Ellet Cabell (Vice President Presiding)
- Succeeded by: Mary Parke Foster

Personal details
- Born: Letitia Green; January 8, 1843 Allegheny, Pennsylvania, U.S.
- Died: December 25, 1913 (aged 70) Bloomington, Illinois, U.S.
- Resting place: Evergreen Cemetery
- Party: Democratic
- Spouse: Adlai Stevenson I (m. 1866)
- Children: 4, including Lewis
- Parents: Lewis W. Green; Mary Peachy Fry
- Relatives: Julia Green Scott (sister)

Letitia Stevenson (née Green; January 8, 1843 – December 25, 1913) was the wife of Vice President Adlai E. Stevenson I, and thus second lady of the United States from 1893 to 1897.

== Biography ==
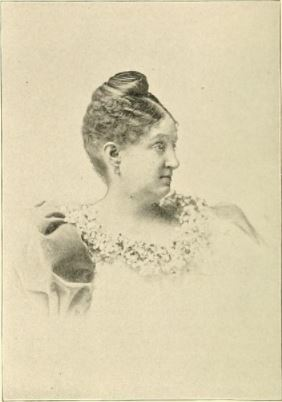
Letitia Stevenson

=== Early life ===
Letitia Green was born on January 8, 1843. She was the daughter of Presbyterian Reverend Lewis W. Green (1806–1863), who was the head of Centre College in Danville, Kentucky, and Mary Peachy Fry, a descendant of surveyor and adventurer Joshua Fry. She was educated at the Walnut Hill Female Institute in Lexington, Kentucky, and a school near Gramercy Park in New York City. Upon the outbreak of the Civil War in 1861, she returned to Lexington. After her father died the next year, Green moved with her mother north to Chenoa, Illinois, where her sister, Julia Green Scott, lived. There, she met and courted Adlai Ewing Stevenson, a graduate of Centre College. The pair wed at Julia's house on December 22, 1866.

The Stevensons moved into a house in nearby Bloomington in 1869, shortly after the birth of their first child, Lewis, so named for her father. They carefully planned their family in an era before this was common or publicly accepted. Letitia maintained the household in the frequent absence of her husband. Daughter Mary, nicknamed "Bessie", was sickly as a child and eventually succumbed to tuberculosis in 1895. Lewis was also frequently hospitalized due to complications from an injury sustained while hunting. Stevenson traveled with her son to sanitariums across the region. Eventually, Stevenson's responsibilities waned as Lewis married and daughters Julia and Letitia left for boarding school. After a political appointment in 1884 led to a move to Washington, D.C., Stevenson became engrossed in the emerging women's rights movement.

When Adlai was nominated for Vice President of the United States in 1892, Letitia campaigned on his behalf. Already used to public speaking through her leadership of Bloomington women's clubs, Stevenson spoke on her husband's behalf, especially in opposition to the Lodge Bill. She also typically wrote an acknowledgment letter to local media after campaigning in a city.

Lewis Stevenson became the Illinois secretary of state and father of Illinois Governor and 1952 and 1956 presidential candidate Adlai Stevenson. Their great-grandson, Adlai Ewing Stevenson III, was a U.S. senator from Illinois from 1970 to 1981 and an unsuccessful candidate for Governor of Illinois in 1982 and 1986.

She suffered from severe rheumatism that often forced her to wear leg braces and migraine headaches. Nonetheless, she was described as a "keen observer and judge of people, and a charming hostess"". She helped establish the Daughters of the American Revolution to try to heal the divisions between North and South after the Civil War and succeeded Mrs. Caroline Harrison as President General.

=== Death ===
She died at home on Christmas Day aged 70 in 1913.

Honorary titles
Preceded by Anna Morton	Second Lady of the United States; 1893–1897	Succeeded by Jennie Tuttle Hobart
