= Mary Virginia Ellet Cabell =

American educator (1839–1930)

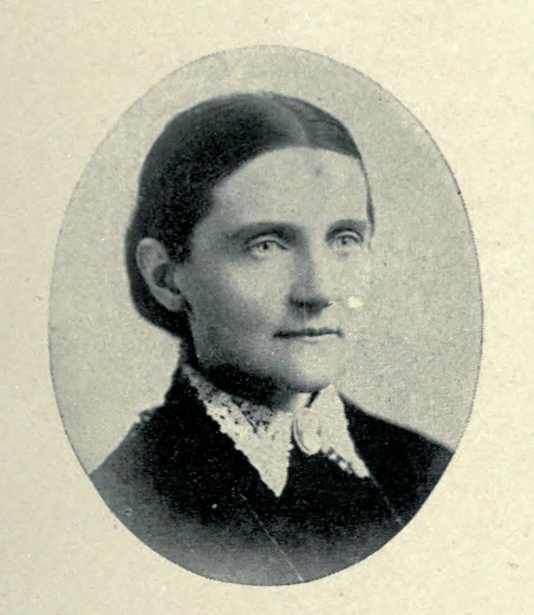

Vice President Presiding, National Society Daughters of the American Revolution
- In office 1892–1893
- Preceded by: Caroline Scott Harrison
- Succeeded by: Letitia Green Stevenson

Personal details
- Born: Mary Virginia Ellet; January 24, 1839 Lynchburg, Virginia
- Died: July 4, 1930 (aged 91) Michigan City, Indiana
- Spouse: William Daniel Cabell (m. 1867; died 1904)
- Children: 6

Mary Virginia Ellet Cabell (January 24, 1839 – July 4, 1930) was Vice President Presiding of the Daughters of the American Revolution.

== Personal life ==
Mary Virginia Ellet was born on 24 January 1839 at Point of Honor in Lynchburg, Virginia, the daughter of Charles Ellet Jr. and Elvira Augusta Daniel. She married William Daniel Cabell (1834-1904) on 9 July 1867 and became step-mother to his two daughters. Together, the couple had six children: three boys and three girls. William opened Norwood School for boys in Nelson County, Virginia from 1865 to 1879. After the school's closure, the Cabells moved to Washington, D.C., where, in 1881, the couple created and directed the Norwood Institute for Girls and Young Ladies. In 1897 the couple left education and returned to Nelson County. She died on 4 July 1930 in Michigan City, Indiana at the age of 91.

== DAR membership ==
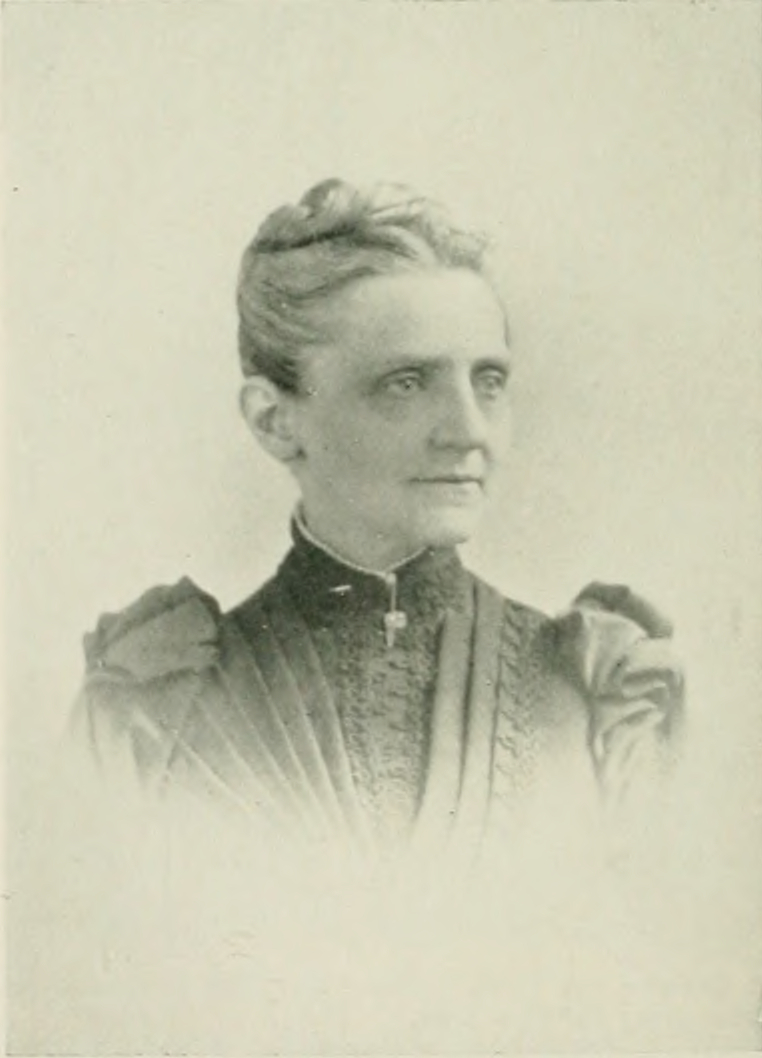
Mary Virginia Ellet Cabell, "A Woman of the Century"

Mary Cabell was one of 18 organizing members of the Daughters of the American Revolution on 11 October 1890. She presided over the first meeting and would continue to chair additional meetings and the 1st and 2nd Continental Congresses. The newly formed Society elected the First Lady of the United States, Caroline Scott Harrison as their inaugural President General and Harrison accepted on the condition that she would be more of a figurehead. Cabell was given the title Vice President Presiding and was charged with the practical running and administration of the DAR. When Harrison died in office on 25 Oct 1892, Cabell took over all responsibilities of the President General's office but did not take on the title. During the next election, Cabell turned down the nomination of DAR President General in favor of nominees with more prominent social standing.

Cabell was responsible for establishing much of the DAR's foundation, goals, and purpose. Her home served as the headquarters of the DAR in its first year, and she proposed the construction of their "House Beautiful," Memorial Continental Hall, in Washington, D.C. Her vision was of “the finest building ever owned by women . . .” one that would serve “as an outward and visible sign of an inward and spiritual grace.” During the First Continental Congress, Cabell asked members “What is your object: what do you propose; what good will you do; what is the use of such an organization? What does thou work?” She had a vision of women working together to achieve their goals in harmony and friendship. During the 7th Continental Congress in 1898, Cabell was elected Honorary Vice President General.
