= Daisy Allen Story =

American clubwoman and suffragist

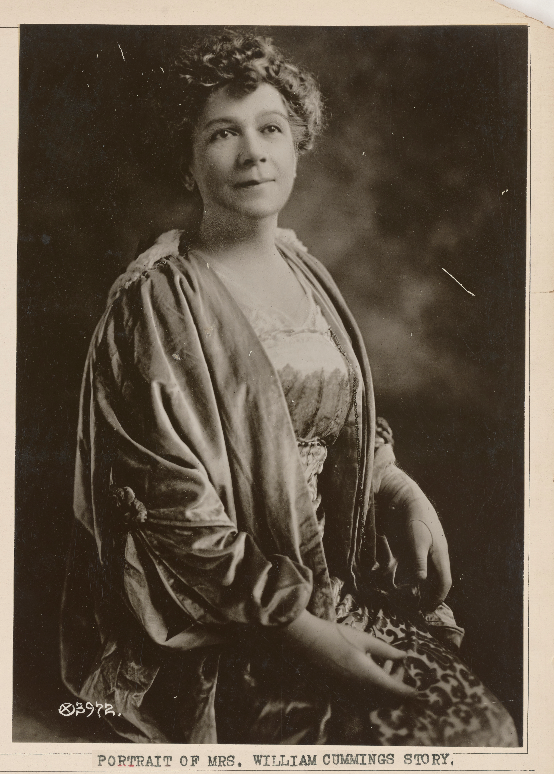

9th President General, National Society Daughters of the American Revolution
- In office 1913–1917
- Preceded by: Julia Green Scott
- Succeeded by: Sarah Elizabeth Mitchell Guernsey

New York State Regent, Daughters of the American Revolution
- In office 1909–19??

Personal details
- Born: Fanny Ella Daisy Allen; 1858 New York City, New York, U.S.
- Died: July 15, 1932 (aged 73–74) New Rochelle, New York, U.S.
- Resting place: Ferncliff Cemetery
- Party: Republican
- Spouse(s): Edward Price; William Cumming Story
- Children: 3
- Relatives: Stephen Allen (grandfather)
- Occupation: socialite, suffragist, clubwoman

Daisy Allen Story (née Fanny Ella Daisy Allen; 1858 – 1932), also known as Mrs. William C. Story, was an American socialite, clubwoman, and suffragist. She served two consecutive terms as the President General of the Daughters of the American Revolution.

== Early life and family ==
Story was born Fanny Ella Daisy Allen in 1858 in New York City to James Hart Allen and Frances "Fannie" Lupton Porter Allen. She was the granddaughter of Stephen Allen, the first elected Mayor of New York City and a member of the New York State Senate and the New York State Assembly.

== Clubwoman ==
Story was active in many women's organizations. She served as President of the New York City Federation of Women's Clubs and, in 1910, as president of the New York State Federation of Women's Clubs, sitting on the Cooperating Suffrage Committee. She was vice president of the Washington Headquarters Association and president of the Woman's Republican Club, during which time the club demanded women's suffrage. She also served as president of the National Emergency Relief Society.

She was a member of the Society of the Colonial Dames of the State of New York and a member of the Daughters of the American Revolution. She was a member of the New York City Chapter of the DAR before organizing the Manhattan Chapter in 1892. She was elected as New York State Regent in 1909. She was also the first New York state director of the Children of the American Revolution.

In 1913, she was elected as the ninth President General of the National Society Daughters of the American Revolution, serving two consecutive terms. During her tenure as president general, she inaugurated a movement to organize members of the DAR for war relief work and advocated for universal military training. Following the end of her second term in 1917, she was elected Honorary President General of the Daughters of the American Revolution.

== Personal life ==
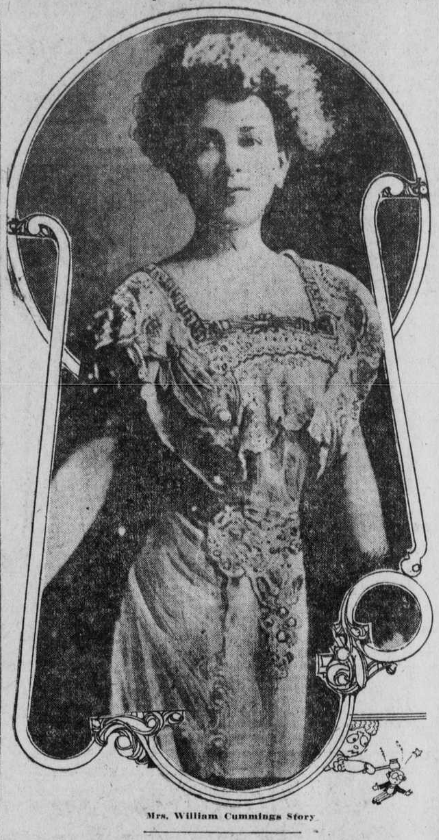
Mrs. William C. Story

She was first married to Edward Price. Price was abusive to her, which led to her cousin and former fiancé, Montgomery Throop, beating him with a horsewhip.

She married a second time to William Cumming Story, the vice president of the American Savings Bank in New York, on February 8, 1881, in Manhattan. Her husband also served as the first vice president of the Standard Statistics Company of New York and was an active member of the Sons of the American Revolution. The couple lived in Manhattan and in Brooklyn before moving to New Rochelle in 1930. They had three sons: Harold, Allen, and Sterling.

Story and two of her sons, Allen and Sterling, were arrested on June 26, 1918, and charged with grand larceny, petit larceny, and conspiracy. They were accused of participating in a profiteering scheme that redirected funds designated for comfort kits for U.S. soldiers to a solicitor from which they received a percentage.

Story died from heart disease on July 15, 1932, at her home in New Rochelle. Her funeral at Christ Episcopal Church in Pelham Manor was attended by local, state, and national leaders of the Daughters of the American Revolution. An American flag, which had been presented to Story by President Theodore Roosevelt, was draped over her coffin during the service. She was buried at Ferncliff Cemetery.
