= Julia Green Scott =

American socialite and philanthropist (1839–1923)

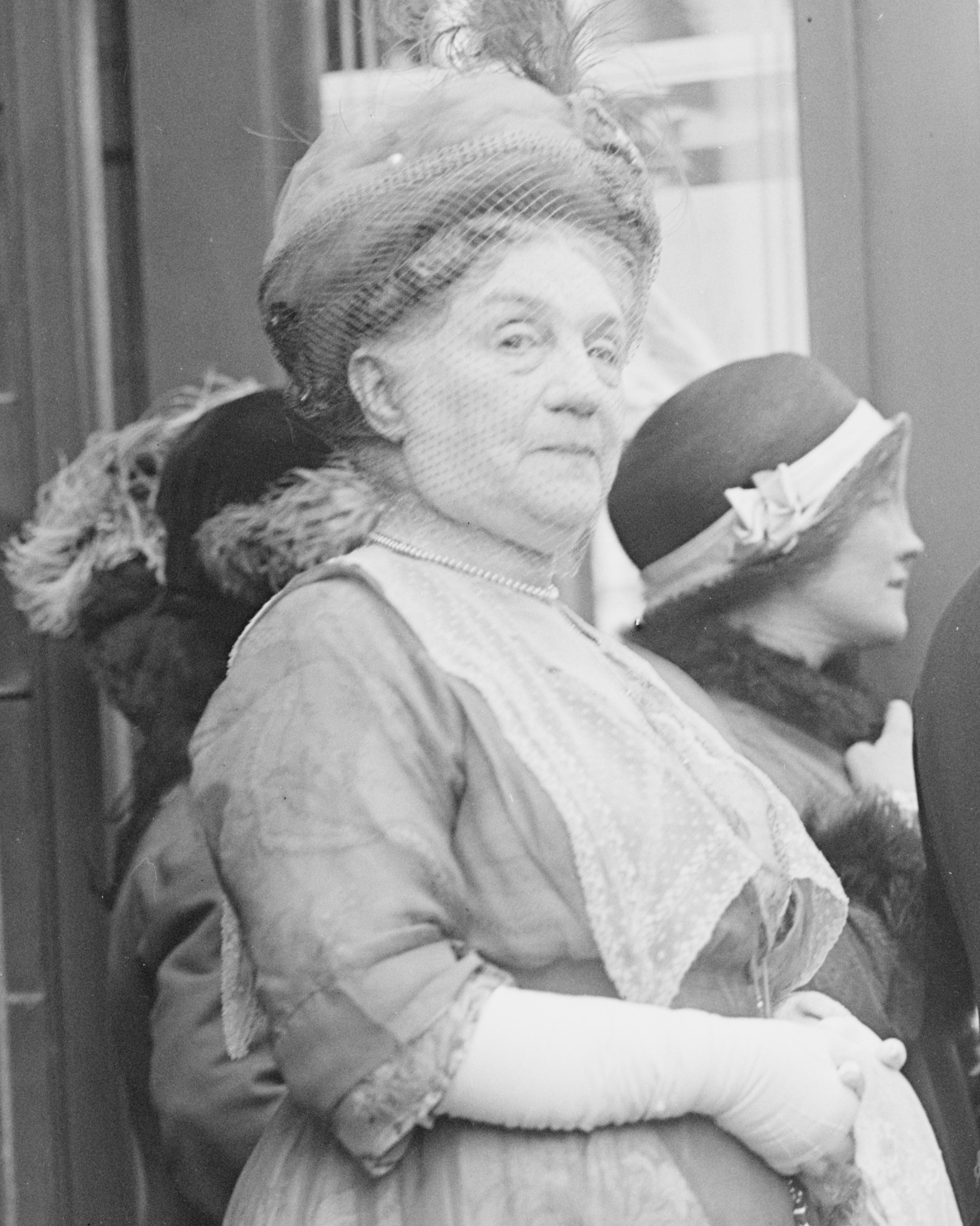
- Scott in 1913

8th President General, National Society Daughters of the American Revolution
- In office 1909–1913
- Preceded by: Emily Nelson Ritchie McLean
- Succeeded by: Daisy Allen Story

Vice President General, National Society Daughters of the American Revolution
- In office 1901–1905

Personal details
- Born: Julia Green; February 14, 1839 Danville, Kentucky, U.S.
- Died: April 29, 1923 (aged 84) Bloomington, Illinois, U.S.
- Resting place: Evergreen Cemetery
- Party: Democratic
- Spouse: Matthew T. Scott
- Children: 3 (including Julia Scott Vrooman)
- Parent(s): Lewis W. Green; Mary Lawrence Fry
- Relatives: Letitia Stevenson (sister)
- Occupation: philanthropist, historian, landowner, socialite

Julia Green Scott (February 14, 1839 – April 29, 1923) was an American socialite, philanthropist, businesswoman, and landowner who served as the president general of the Daughters of the American Revolution from 1909 to 1913. She was one of the largest landowners in the American Midwest, running multiple farms and owning tens of thousands of acres of land. After her husband, Matthew T. Scott, died in 1891, Scott took over as the largest shareholder and president of the McLean County Coal Company. She was presented the Medal of French Gratitude of the First Class in 1921 by Jean Jules Jusserand for her efforts to rehabilitate the French commune Tilloloy after World War I, and for helping find homes for over 4,000 French children left orphaned by the war.

== Early life and family ==
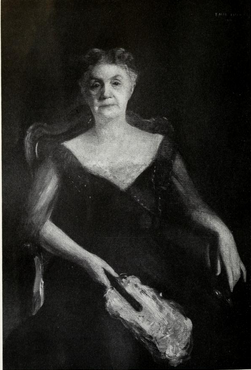
1918 portrait of Scott

Scott was born in Danville, Kentucky on February 14, 1839, to Rev. Lewis W. Green and Mary Lawrence "Peachy" Fry. Her father, a Presbyterian minister, served as the president of Centre College, Transylvania University, and Hampden–Sydney College. Through her mother, Scott was a descendant of the surveyor and adventurer Colonel Joshua Fry and the Revolutionary War veteran Joseph Fry. Scott's great-grandfather, Captain James Speed, was an American officer in the Revolutionary War. She was also a descendant of the Washington family through both of her parents and a descendant of the Colonial Virginian statesman, planter, explorer, and physician Thomas Walker. Scott was the sister of U.S. Second Lady Letitia Green Stevenson.

Scott attended finishing school in New York.

== Marriage and adult life ==
Scott met her future husband, businessman Matthew T. Scott, while he was a student at Centre College and while her father served as the college's president. They married on May 12, 1859, and moved to the prairie in Central Illinois. They were among the first residents, and founders, of the town of Chenoa. She and her husband eventually owned over 45,000 acres of land in Illinois, Iowa, and Tennessee.

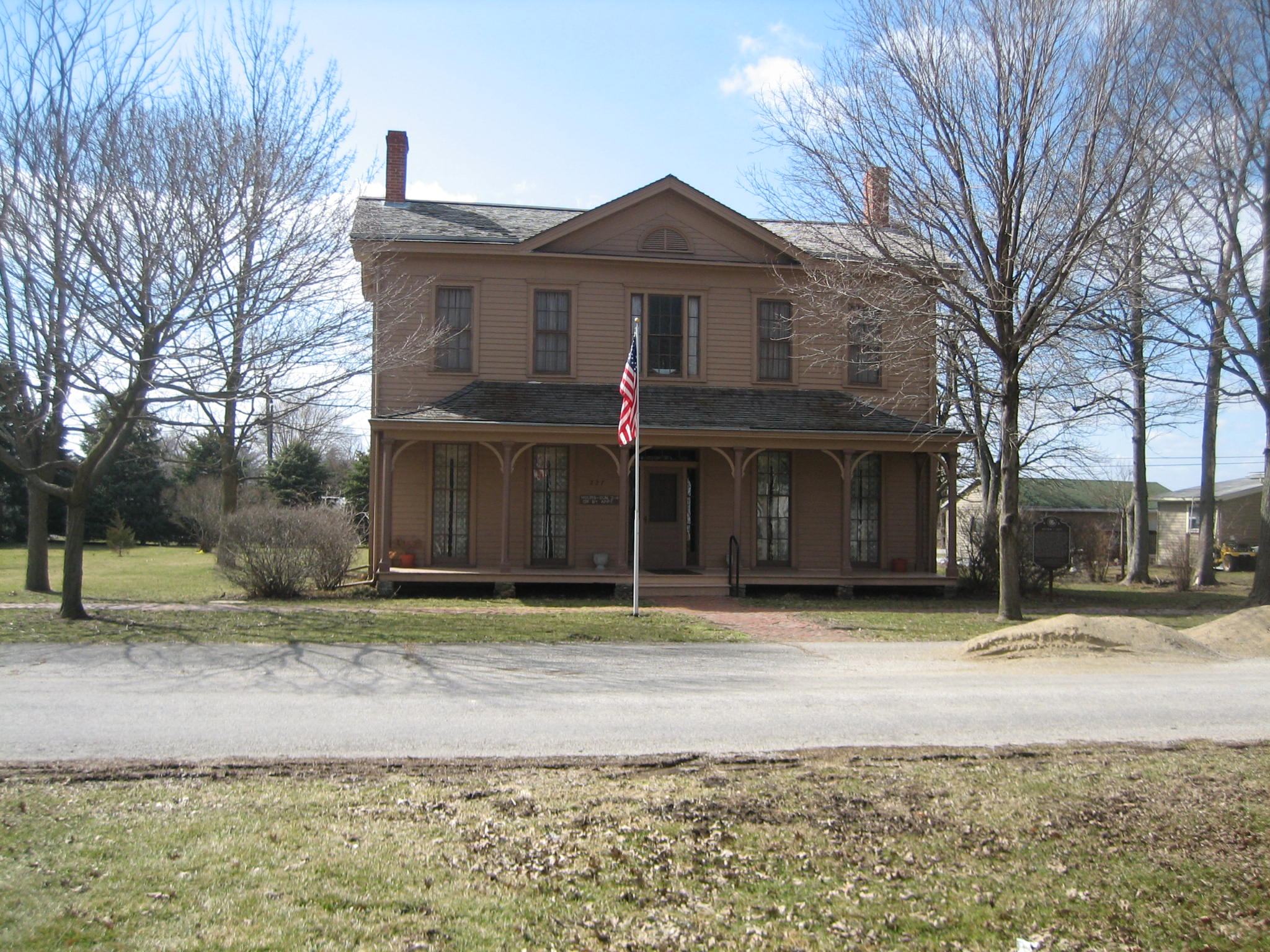
Scott's house in Chenoa

In 1870 Scott and her husband moved to Springfield. After a short time there, they moved to Bloomington, where her husband became the president of the McLean County Coal Company and founded the Democratic newspaper The Bulletin. In 1872 they purchased a mansion at 701 E. Taylor Street.

Scott and her husband had three children: Lewis, Letitia and Julia.

After her husband died in 1891, Scott took charge of managing 9,000 acres of farmland in Illinois and Indiana, and became the principal stockholder and president of the McLean County Coal Company. Between 1900 and 1901, Scott had additions built onto the family home on Taylor Street, including two new porches and interior additions designed by the architect Arthur L. Pillsbury.

Scott maintained a spring residence in Washington, D.C., a summer residence in Charlevoix, a fall residence in Bloomington, and a winter residence in Mississippi.

Scott became a prominent socialite and hostess who was very involved in the upper echelons of American high society and politics. Her sister, Letitia, married U.S. Vice President Adlai Stevenson I and her daughter, Julia, married U.S. Assistant Secretary of Agriculture Carl Schurz Vrooman. Parties and receptions she hosted at her Taylor Street residence were written about in The Bulletin and The Pantagraph newspapers.

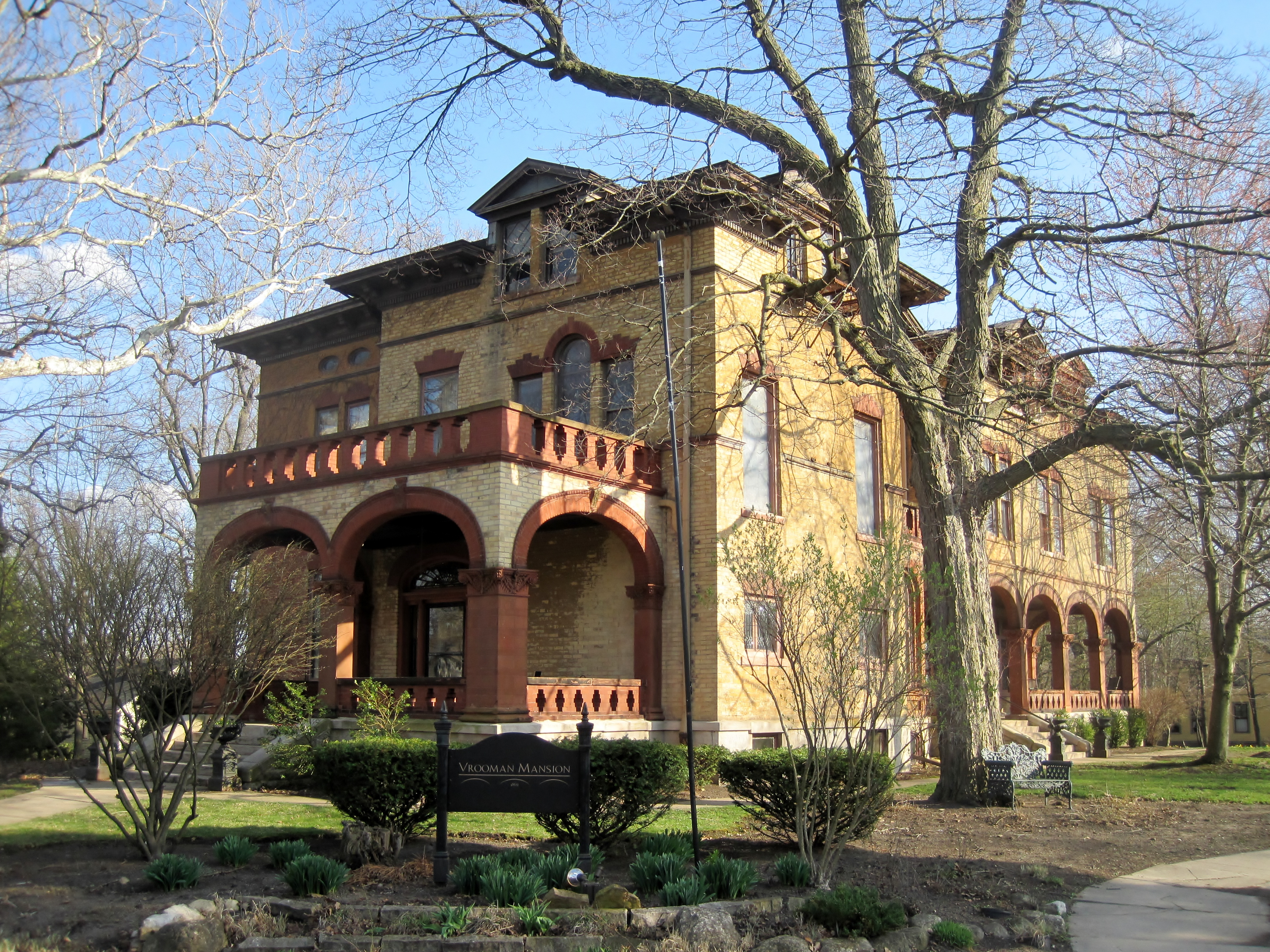
Scott's home in Bloomington

=== Philanthropy ===
She was an active member of various social organizations and women's clubs, including the Peace Commission of the General Federation of Women's Clubs and the Women's Council of George Washington University. Scott established the Matthew T. Scott Institute in Phelps, Kentucky in 1906, in memory of her husband, to provide education for poor white men from the Appalachian Mountains.

In 1908 she had a monument dedicated to George Rogers Clark and his companions erected on the banks of the Ohio River near Fort Massac.

In 1911, as one of Illinois' largest landowners and a conservation advocate, she sent forty of her tenant farmers to the University of Illinois College of Agriculture, Consumer, and Environmental Sciences so they could learn advanced farming methods.

==== Daughters of the American Revolution ====
Scott joined the Daughters of the American Revolution, of which her sister was a founding member. She hosted her local chapter and visiting officers from other chapters to a reception at her home, which had over three-hundred guests. She was elected Vice-president General of the Daughters of the American Revolution in 1901 and served in that capacity for four years. In a highly publicized election in 1909, Scott defeated Daisy Allen Story for the office of President-General of the organization. During her tenure as president, the Memorial Continental Hall in Washington, D.C. was dedicated as the national headquarters for the Daughters of the American Revolution. As president, Scott travelled the United States to recruit new members and give speeches promoting the organization's work. The Daughters of the American Revolution gained 7,000 members under her leadership.

During World War I, Scott served as president of the organization's War Relief Committee, raising money to aid war orphans in France. In 1921, French Ambassador Jean Jules Jusserand presented her with the Medal of French Gratitude of the First Class in recognition for her efforts to rehabilitate the French commune Tilloloy and the adoption of over 4,000 war orphans.

After the end of her second presidential term in 1919, she was elected Honorary President General, a position she retained until her death.

== Death ==
Scott died at her home on April 29, 1923, after suffering a stroke. She is buried in Evergreen Cemetery.
