= Matthew T. Scott =

American agriculturalist (1828–1891)

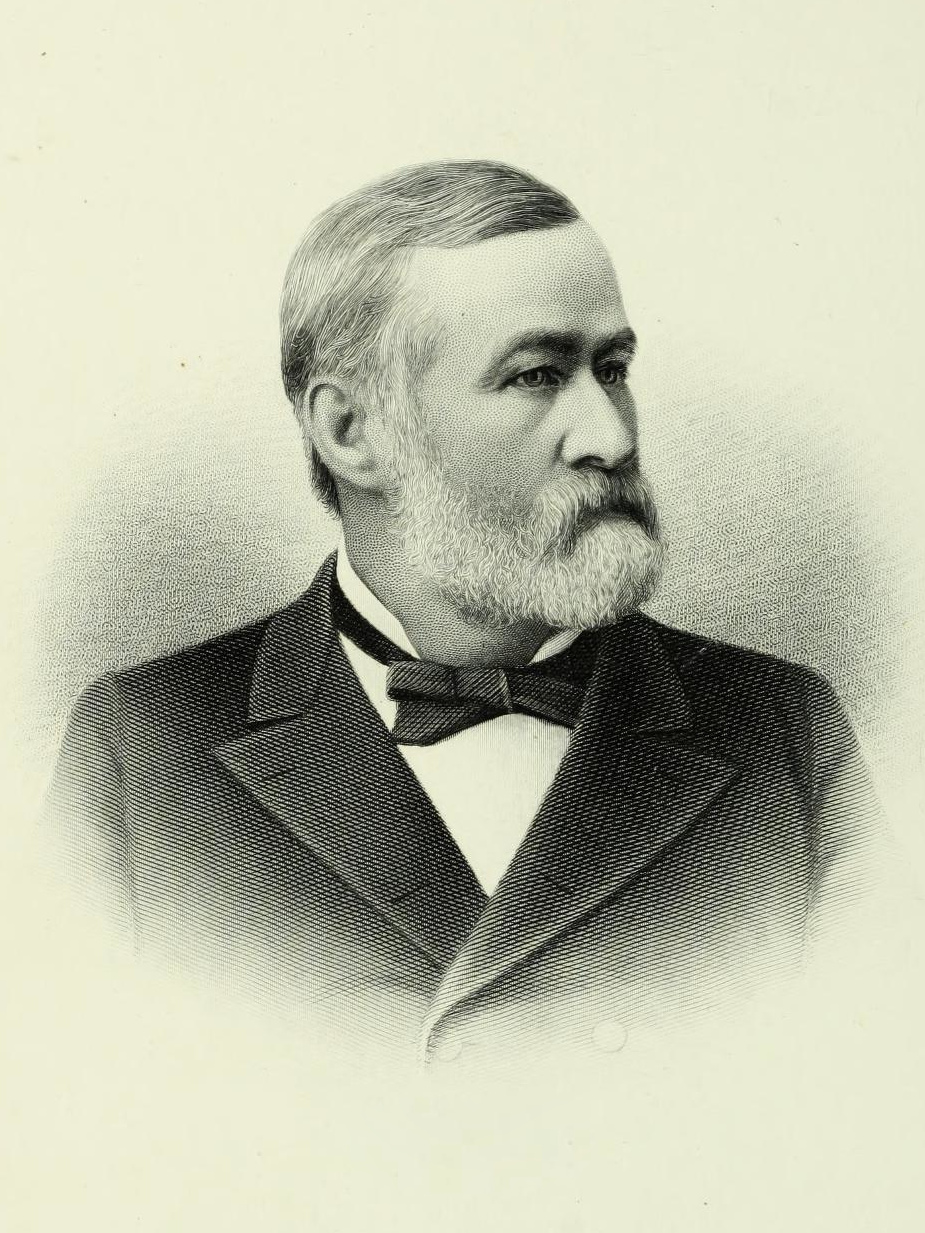
- Matthew T. Scott (1828–1891)
- Born: February 24, 1828; Lexington, Kentucky
- Died: May 21, 1891 (aged 63); Bloomington, Illinois
- Spouse: Julia Green
- Children: 3, including Julia Scott Vrooman

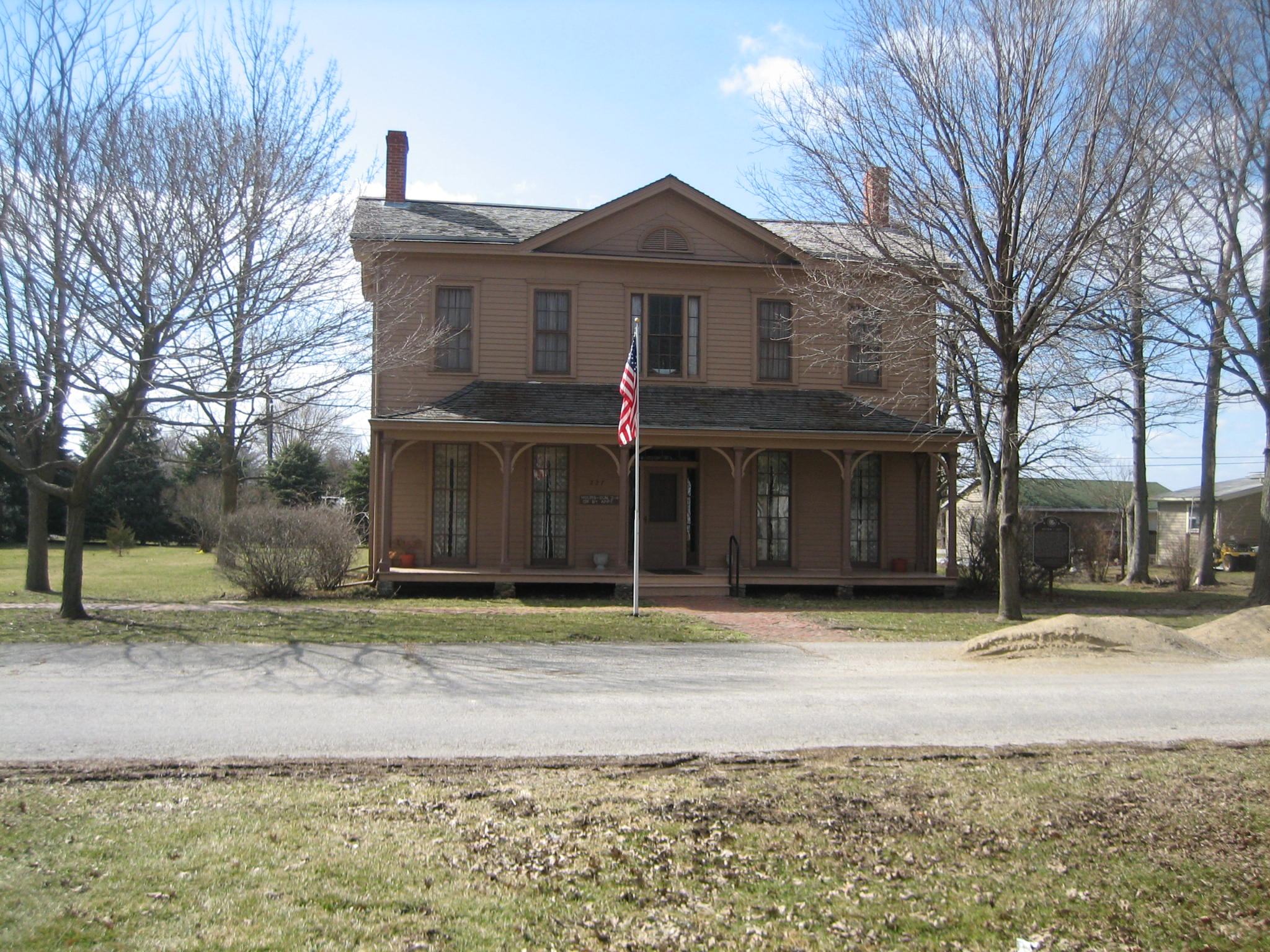
The Matthew T. Scott House as it sits today

Matthew Thompson Scott (1828–1891) was an American agriculturist and real estate operator during the 19th century. Born and raised in Kentucky he attended college at Centre College also in Kentucky. After college he spent several years tending to his father's lands in Ohio. He then journeyed to Central Illinois to develop prairie land into farmland as well as build houses. While doing this he created and developed the city of Chenoa. He also developed the McLean County Coal Company with Adlai Ewing Stevenson I. Scott also was the founder of the Bloomington Bulletin a Democratic daily newspaper. He died in Bloomington in 1891.

== Early life ==
Matthew Thompson Scott Jr. was born February 24, 1828, in Lexington, Kentucky, as the fourth son to a wealthy banker Matthew T. Scott Sr. Scott Sr. was president of the Northern Bank of Kentucky. The Scott family was of Scotch-Irish descent who was a direct descendant from the old Covenanter hero, Robert Scott, a member of the Lower House of the Parliament of Scotland. Robert Scott lived during the latter part of the 10th century and fought at the Battle of Bothwell Bridge.

== College and early career ==
Matthew T Scott Jr. attended Centre College in Lexington, Kentucky, and graduated in 1846. During his time at Centre College he met his soon-to-be wife Miss Julia Green. Julia Green was daughter of the Centre College president Rev. Lewis W. Green. They would marry in 1859.

After college he headed north to manage his family's land in Ohio. Between 1848 and 1859 the Scott family bought over 45,000 acres (180 km^{2}) of western land, with much of it being in Central Illinois. The base of what Matthew T Scott's personal holdings were a tract of land near the present town of Chenoa, Illinois.

== Development of Chenoa ==
In 1855 news of the Toledo, Peoria and Western Railway extending through Chenoa to intersect with the current Chicago and Alton Railroad, Scott began to plat the city of Chenoa. He established the first trackside grain storage facility in northern McLean County. He also launched the most extensive advertising campaign ever seen in Central Illinois of that time, to promote the development of his town. In his advertisements, he told prospective buyers "The lack of local timber would be offset by the cheap coal that would be shipped in on rail from Indiana and stressed that local farmers and merchants would be at a distinct trading advantage". He dug a cistern and offered to stake a quarter interest in a steam-powered mill. He also donated land for a church and burial sites. He also built his personal house in 1855 known today as the Matthew T. Scott House.

During 1855, 12 houses were built by Scott and over 2,000 acres (8.1 km^{2}) of prairieland was broken as agriculture began to boom in the area. By the 1850s Scott had broken and fenced more than 5,000 acres (20 km^{2}) of land, most of it located within modern day Chenoa Township. By 1890 50 tenants were farming 8,000 acres (32 km^{2}) of Scott's land, most of it being in Central Illinois.

== Later career and death ==
In 1867 Matthew T Scott founded the McLean County Coal Company in conjunction with Adlai E. Stevenson I. Mclean County Coal Company was the most successful coal mine in McLean County. He also established the Bloomington Bulletin which was a Democratic Daily newspaper based in Bloomington, Illinois.

Matthew T. Scott died May 21, 1891. He is buried in the city he loved and developed.
