= Lincoln Oak =

Oak tree in Bloomington, Illinois

Coordinates: 40°28′32″N 88°59′6″W

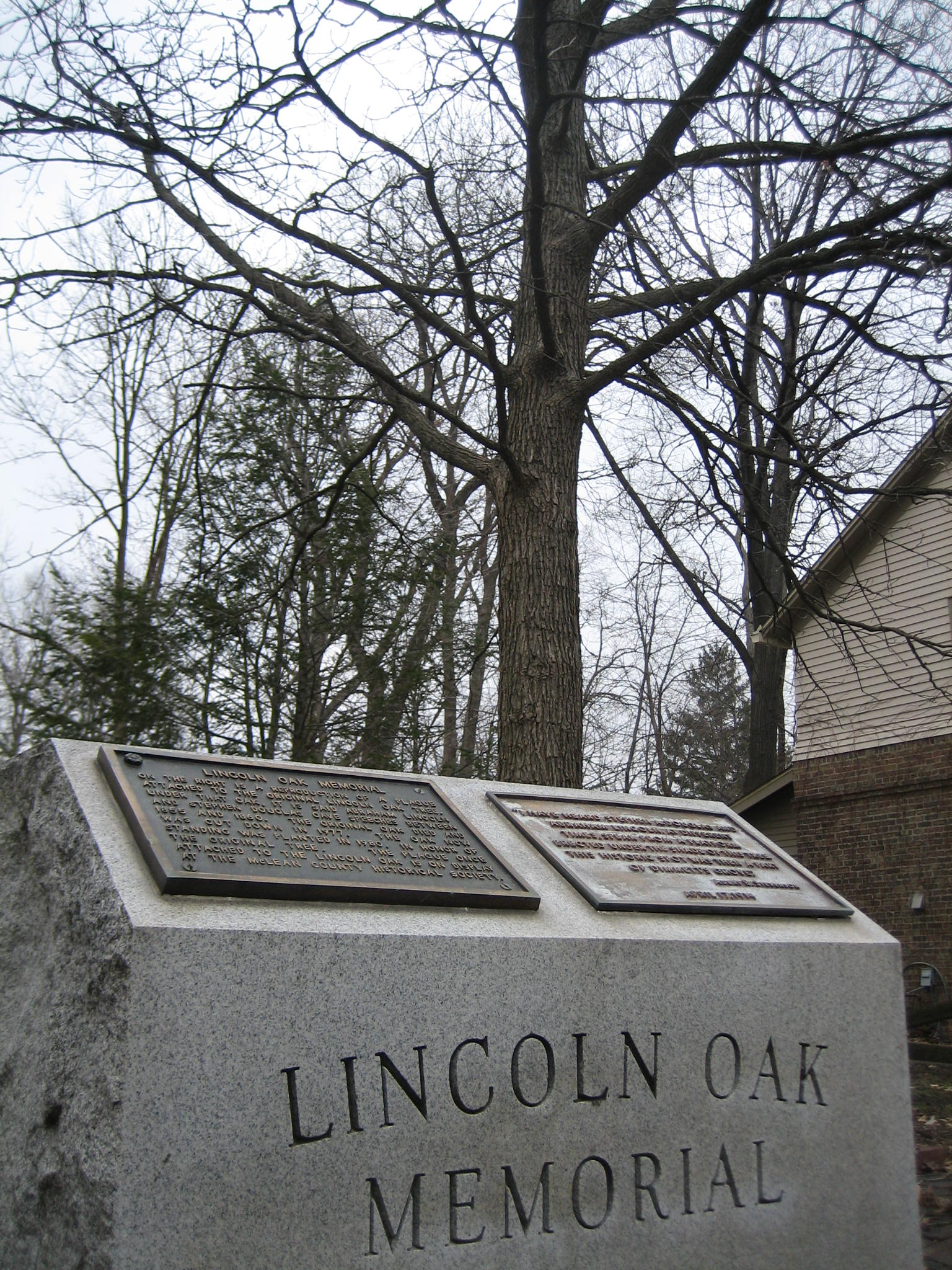
The original Lincoln Oak died in 1976; this replacement was planted in 1980

The Lincoln Oak was an oak tree in Bloomington, Illinois. Stephen A. Douglas and Abraham Lincoln both gave speeches at the tree during the 1850s. The original Lincoln Oak died in 1976.

== History ==
The Lincoln Oak was an oak tree located in Bloomington, Illinois, that was the site of several speeches by Abraham Lincoln and Stephen A. Douglas between 1855 and 1860 The tree was located in an area of Bloomington known as Dimmett's Grove when Lincoln and Douglas spoke there. In 1869, near the oak, the Vrooman Mansion was built. The house still overlooks the site of the Lincoln Oak today. The original Lincoln Oak died in 1976; in 1980 a new oak tree was planted in honor of the original Lincoln Oak.

== Memorial and park ==
Vachel Lindsay was the dedication speaker at a 1914 ceremony in which a plaque was affixed to the original Lincoln Oak. The plaque featured a quote from Adlai Stevenson I concerning the Lincoln Oak:

I have heard Stephen A. Douglas and Abraham Lincoln at different times speak from a platform erected under the shade of this tree. This historic spot was then a part of Dimmett's Grove.

In 1966 the 32 foot by 32 foot parcel of the Vrooman Mansion lot containing the oak was deeded to the city of Bloomington. The plaque from the original oak is on display at the McLean County Historical Society. A leaf from the original Lincoln Oak tree is held in the Milburn Lincoln Wilson Abraham Lincoln Collection at Montana State University.

== See also ==
- Lincoln-Douglas debates
- List of individual trees
