= Bright Stalk Wind Farm =

Wind farm in Illinois, United States

- Country: USA
- Location: Chenoa, Illinois
- Coordinates: 40°40′45.9″N 88°40′53.5″W
- Status: Active
- Owner: EDP Renewables North America

Wind farm
- Type: Onshore

Power generation
- Units operational: 57 x 3.6 MW
- Make and model: Vestas V136
- Storage capacity: 205 MW

External links
- Website: https://www.edpr.com/north-america/bright-stalk-wind-farm

The Bright Stalk Wind Farm is a 57-turbine wind farm near Chenoa in northeastern McLean County in the U.S. state of Illinois. The turbines were designed to generate a maximum of 205 megawatts of electricity. The complex was completed in 2019 by EDP Renewables North America at a cost of more than $300 million, and entered operations in 2020.

== Detail ==
The Bright Stalk project's 57 wind turbines are each rated at 3.6 mW. 203 megawatts of the project's overall 205-mW capacity were pre-sold to Walmart (123 mW) and Salesforce (80 mW). The project owner states that the wind farm has created nine permanent jobs in and around Chenoa.
