= Evergreen Cemetery (Bloomington, Illinois) =

Cemetery in Bloomington, Illinois

- Interactive map of Evergreen Cemetery

Details
- Established: 1850
- Location: Bloomington, Illinois
- Country: United States
- Coordinates: 40°28′10.7″N 88°59′26.3″W
- Type: Public
- Owned by: City of Bloomington Township
- Size: 87 acres (35 ha)
- Website: www.evergreenmemorialcemetery.com
- Find a Grave: Evergreen Cemetery

Evergreen Cemetery is a cemetery in Bloomington, Illinois. It is also known as Evergreen Memorial Cemetery.

== History ==
The cemetery was originally two separate cemeteries, adjacent to each other. The first was the Bloomington Cemetery, founded in 1850 by the Bloomington Cemetery Association; the other was Evergreen Cemetery, founded in 1860. The Bloomington Cemetery was funded by city tax dollars, while Evergreen was privately funded and maintained. The website of the current cemetery claims Evergreen was founded in the early 1820s.

Over the years, Evergreen suffered from vandalism and deterioration. Community action in the 1950s and 1960s forced the city of Bloomington to buy out the owners of Evergreen Cemetery in 1963, creating the merged Evergreen Memorial Cemetery.

The grounds of Evergreen Memorial Cemetery, which are maintained by staff and community members, include a Civil War burial section.

== Events ==
Since 1995, the McLean County Museum has offered tours of the cemetery the last Saturday & Sunday of September and the first Saturday & Sunday of October. The Evergreen Cemetery Discovery Walk combines historical research by Museum volunteers, costumed actors from Illinois Voices Theatre, and Evergreen Memorial Cemetery into a week-long outdoor theatrical production. People who contributed to central Illinois’ history are shown through costumed actors assuming the characters of McLean County’s ancestors. Presented is not only the "who's who" of McLean County but also the regular day-to-day voices from the past, people who have contributed to the growth, diversity and success of McLean County.

== Notable persons interred ==
- David Davis – Associate Justice of the Supreme Court of the United States and United States Senator
- Ulysses F. Doubleday – U. S. Representative
- Jesse Fell – founder of Illinois State University
- Louis Fitzhenry – U. S. Representative
- Benjamin F. Funk – U. S. Representative
- Isaac Funk – Illinois State Senator
- Asahel Gridley – Illinois State Senator
- John McNulta – U. S. Representative
- William W. Orme – Civil War General
- Charles "Old Hoss" Radbourn – Major League Baseball player, member of the National Baseball Hall of Fame
- James Harvey Robinson (1863–1936) – Historian, scholar, educator
- John M. Scott – Chief Justice of the Supreme Court of Illinois
- Julia Green Scott – President of the Daughters of the American Revolution
- Giles Alexander Smith – Civil War General
- Adlai Stevenson I – Vice President of the United States
- Adlai Stevenson II – United States Ambassador to the United Nations, Governor of Illinois, Presidential Candidate
- Thomas F. Tipton – U. S. Representative
- Carl Schurz Vrooman – Assistant Secretary of Agriculture under President Woodrow Wilson
- Dorothy Gage - niece of L. Frank Baum, namesake of Dorothy Gale in The Wonderful Wizard of Oz

== See also ==
- List of burial places of presidents and vice presidents of the United States
- List of burial places of justices of the Supreme Court of the United States
