= Julie Scott (Rosicrucian) =

Rosicrucian Grandmaster

Julie Scott S.R.C (born August 24, 1958) is one of the known and documented female Rosicrucian Grandmasters. She is the Grand Master of the English Grand Lodge for the Americas, a position she has held since 2000. She is also the secretary for the board of directors of the Supreme Grand Lodge of Ancient Mystical Order Rosae Crucis.
