= Matthew T. Scott House =

Historic house in Illinois, United States

- U.S. National Register of Historic Places
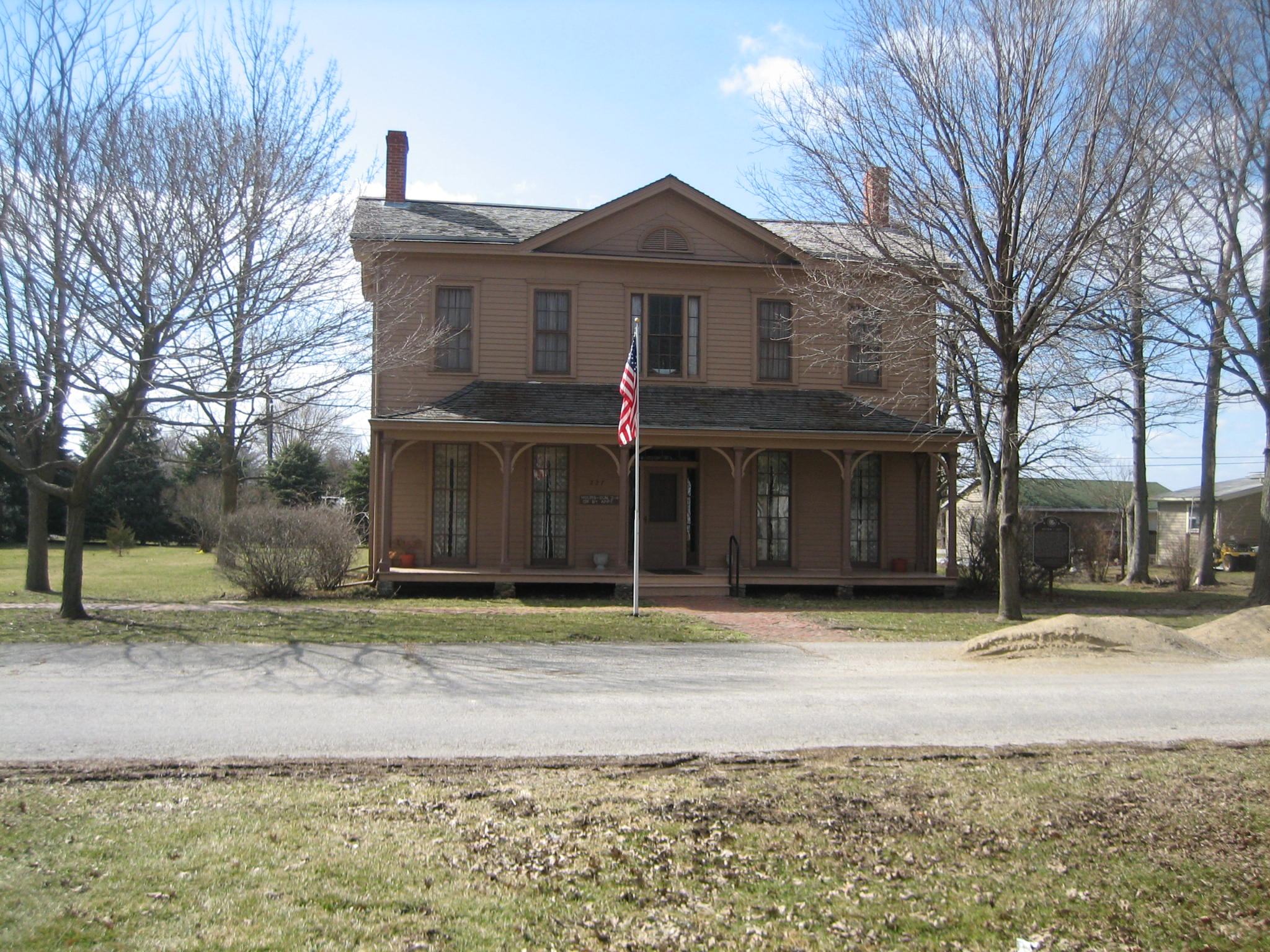

- Location within Illinois Location within the United States
- Interactive map showing the location of Matthew T. Scott House
- Location: 227 1st Ave., Chenoa, Illinois
- Coordinates: 40°44′35″N 88°43′12″W
- Area: less than one acre
- Built: 1855- 1st part, 1863 2nd part
- Architectural style: Colonial Revival
- NRHP reference No.: 83000331
- Added to NRHP: February 10, 1983

The Matthew T. Scott House is a historic house located in Chenoa, Illinois. Chenoa's founder Matthew T. Scott and his wife Julia Green once lived in the house. It was built in two parts. The first section of the House was built in 1855, in the form of a true I-House. It is the caretakers living quarters. The second section of the house, the front section, was built in 1863 in the form known as Georgian. The house features 3 period rooms, a Daughters of the American Revolution (DAR) room, and a Chenoa room. The house is significant as an example of a home from this time period.

== House ==
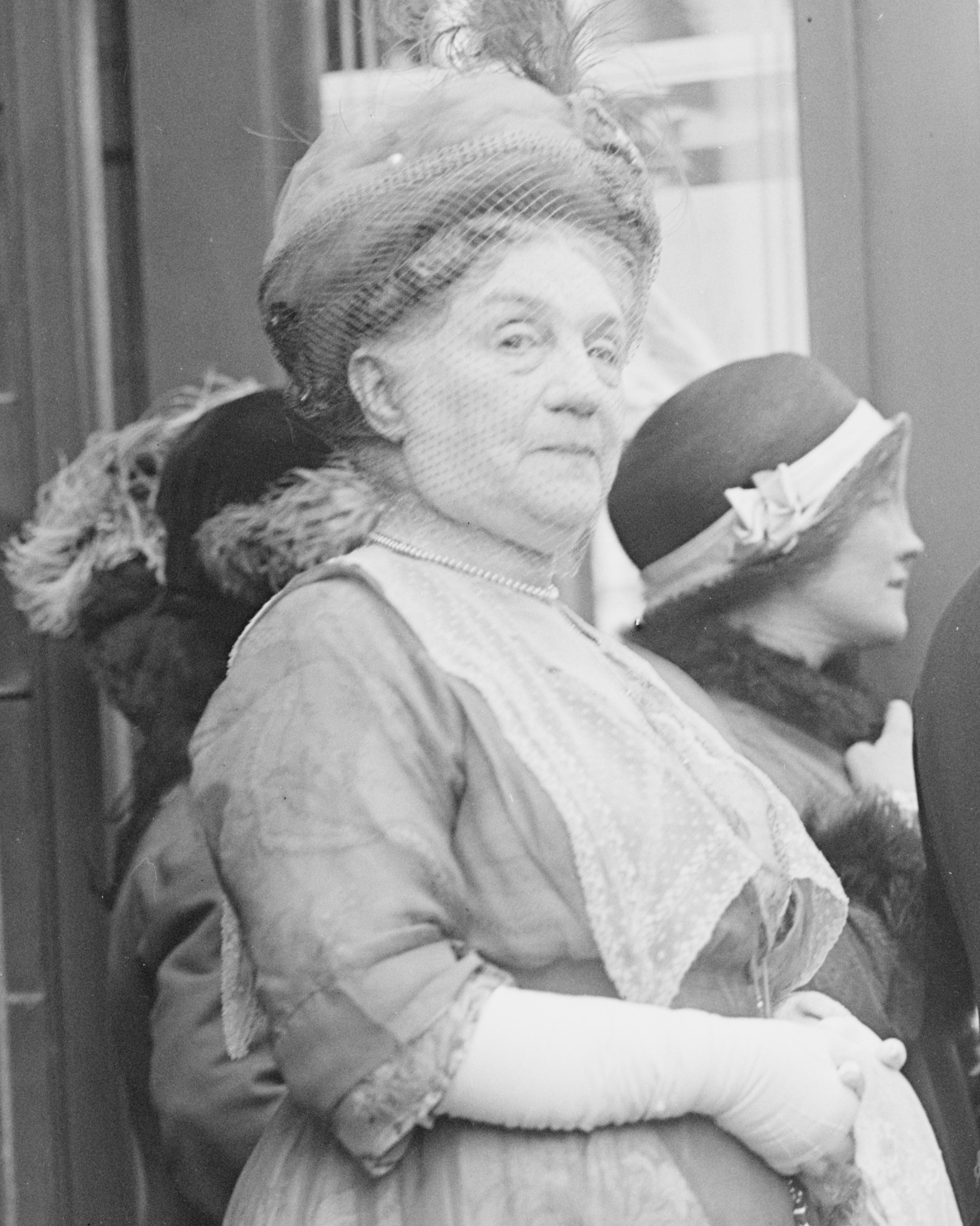
Julia Green Scott in 1913, Ex-President General of D.A.R.

Mrs. Matthew T. Scott was Julia Green, she survived her husband and became not only a landowner, but a founder and later President of the DAR. Her sister, Letitia Green, married Adlai E. Stevenson I in this house in 1866. Mr. Stevenson was a circuit lawyer, then residing in Metamora, who subsequently became a congressman; served as Postmaster General during President Grover Cleveland's first administration (1885–1889), and as the 23rd Vice President of the United States during President Grover Cleveland's second administration (1893-1897).

The house was often visited by Adlai Ewing Stevenson I and his cousin James Stevenson Ewing, U.S. minister to Belgium. Adlai Stevenson courted Letitia Green, who was Matthew T. Scott's sister-in-law. The couple were later married in the house in 1866. Stevenson and Green later had their first child Lewis Green Stevenson in the house in 1868.

The house was later bought and restored by Mrs. Elizabeth Stevenson Ives, a great niece of Matthew T. Scott. The House was listed on the U.S. National Register of Historic Places on February 10, 1983. The Scott House can be found along 1st Avenue in the McLean County, Illinois city of Chenoa.
