= Hiram Perkins Vrooman =

Hiram Perkins Vrooman (24 July 1828, Schenectady – 8 March 1908, Springfield, Massachusetts was an American pioneer, judge and politician.

Hiram was one of eight children of John Vrooman and Elizabeth Bingham who had both grown up in New York State. John was descended from Hendrick Meese Vrooman, who was one of the seventeenth century Dutch settlers of Schenectady who had died in the Schenectady massacre. However, in 1837 the family moved to Sylvania, Ohio where John started a farm. This was shortly after the Toledo War had been resolved, with Sylvania being located in the Toledo strip which was absorbed into Ohio.
