= Chenoa Township, McLean County, Illinois =

Coordinates: 40°42′34″N 88°45′01″W

Chenoa Township
- Township
- Location in McLean County

- McLean County's location in Illinois
- Country: United States
- State: Illinois
- County: McLean
- Established: November 3, 1857

Area
  - Total: 36.46 sq mi (94.4 km^{2})
  - Land: 36.39 sq mi (94.2 km^{2})
  - Water: 0.06 sq mi (0.16 km^{2}) 0.16%

Population (2010)
  - Estimate (2016): 2,037
  - Density: 57/sq mi (22/km^{2})
- Time zone: UTC-6 (CST)
  - Summer (DST): UTC-5 (CDT)
- FIPS code: 17-113-12944

Chenoa Township is located in McLean County, Illinois. As of the 2010 census, its population was 2,074 and it contained 928 housing units.

== Geography ==
According to the 2010 census, the township has a total area of 36.46 square miles (94.4 km^{2}), of which 36.39 square miles (94.2 km^{2}) (or 99.81%) is land and 0.06 square miles (0.16 km^{2}) (or 0.16%) is water.

== Demographics ==
Historical population
Census	Pop.	Note	%±
2016 (est.)	2,037
U.S. Decennial Census
