= Chenoa, Illinois =

City of Chenoa
- City
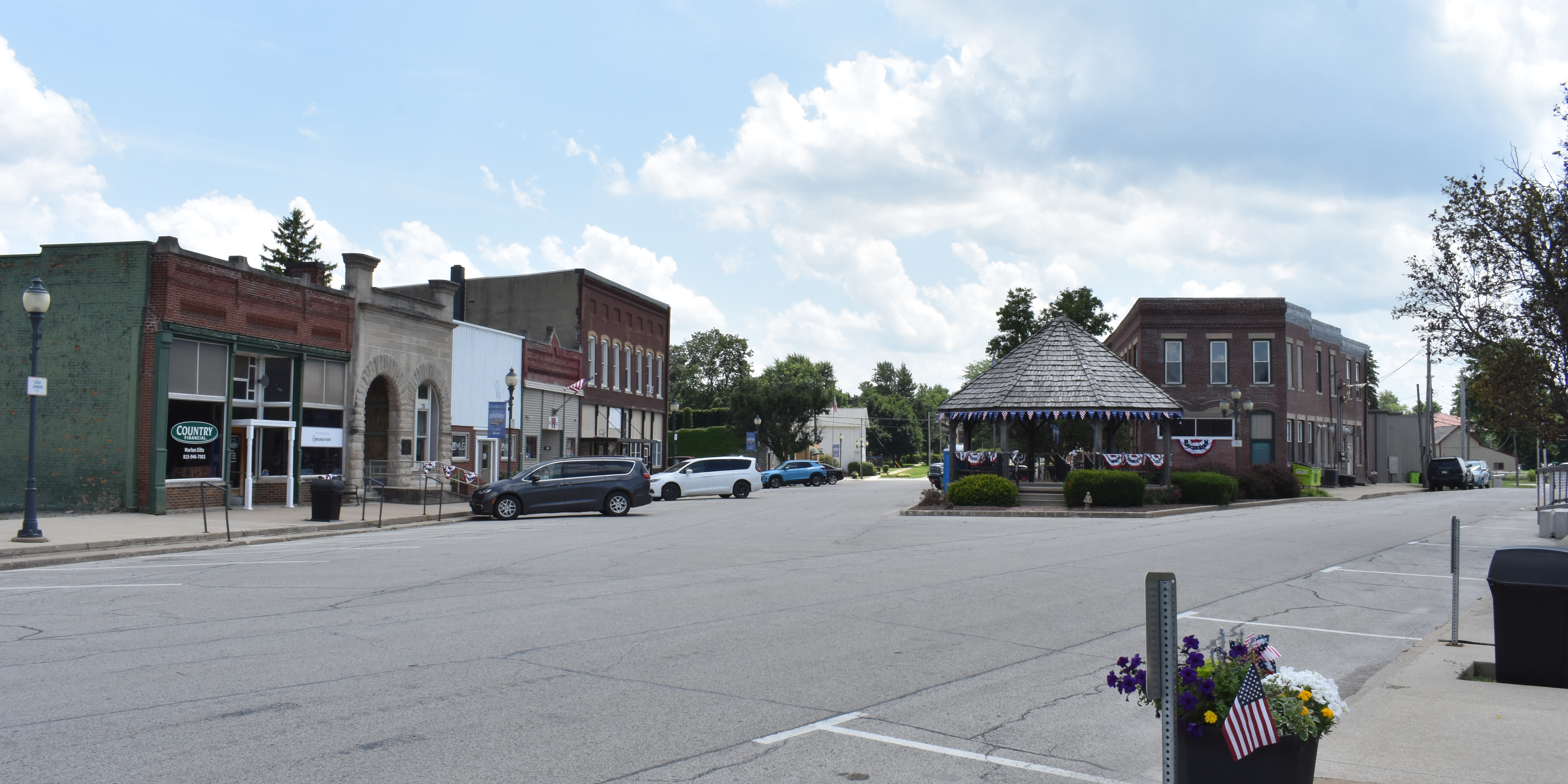
- Chenoa in July 2026
- Motto: Crossroads of Opportunity
- Location of Chenoa in McLean County, Illinois.
- Coordinates: 40°45′10″N 88°42′49″W
- Country: United States
- State: Illinois
- County: McLean
- Township: Chenoa
- Founded: 1854
- Founder: Matthew T. Scott

Government
  - Mayor: David Shane

Area
  - Total: 2.47 sq mi (6.40 km^{2})
  - Land: 2.43 sq mi (6.29 km^{2})
  - Water: 0.042 sq mi (0.11 km^{2})
- Elevation: 719 ft (219 m)

Population (2020)
  - Total: 1,720
  - Estimate (2024): 1,699
  - Density: 707.8/sq mi (273.27/km^{2})
- Time zone: UTC−6 (CST)
  - Summer (DST): UTC−5 (CDT)
- ZIP Code: 61726
- Area code: 815
- FIPS code: 17-12931
- GNIS ID: 2393816
- Website: www.chenoail.org

Chenoa is a city in McLean County, Illinois, United States. The population was 1,695 at the 2020 census. The city is located at the intersections of Interstate 55, Historic Route 66, and U.S. Route 24. Founded in 1854 by Matthew T. Scott, Chenoa was created to provide a retail and trade center for his farm tenants as well as a grain shipping facility. The Chenoa Centennial was celebrated in 1954. The town is situated in a highly productive agricultural area. The town school system closed at the end of the 2004 school year, consolidating with the nearby Prairie Central school district.

== History ==
=== Founding of Chenoa ===
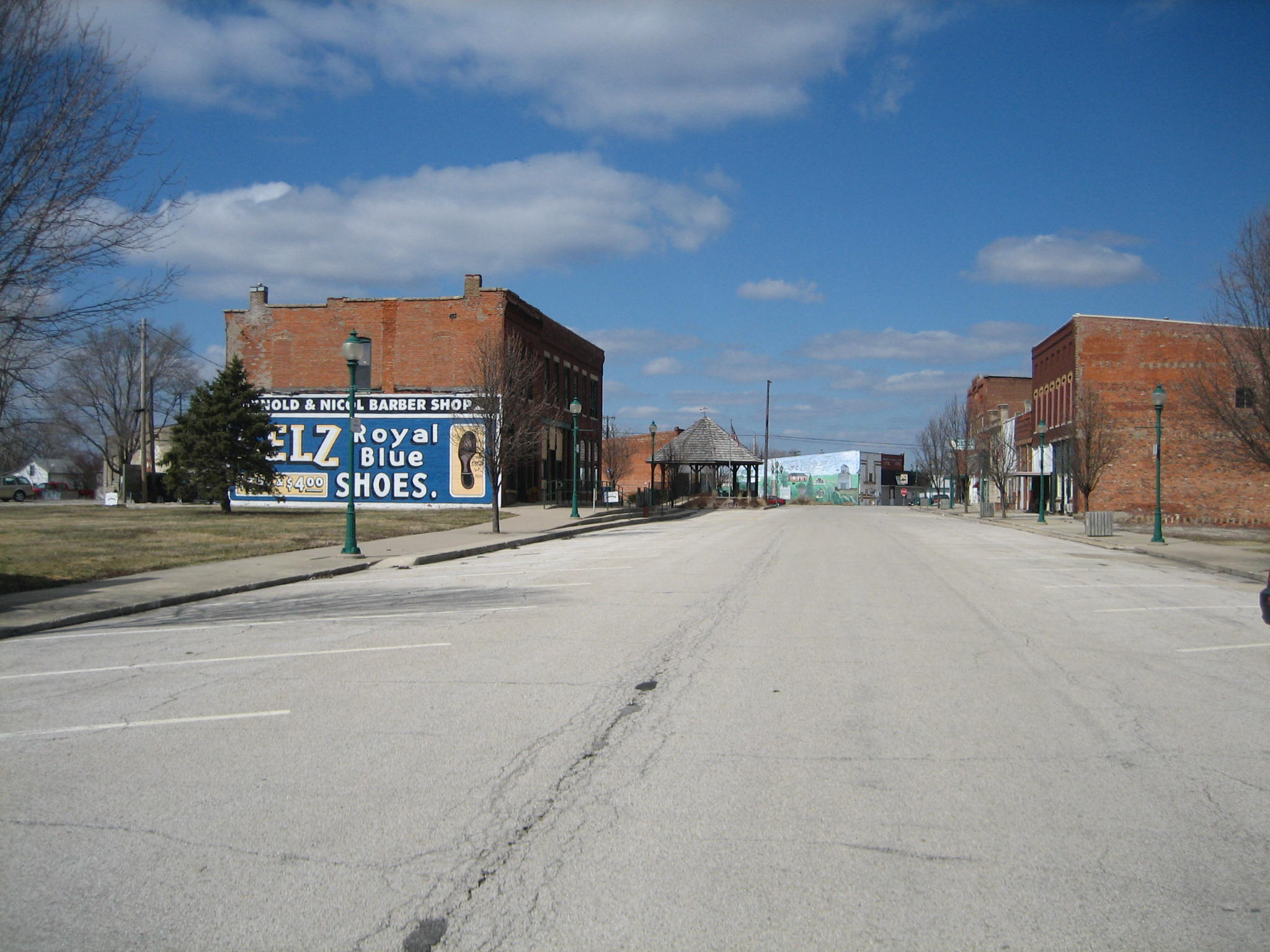
Downtown Chenoa, Illinois in mid-March 2007. The Historic Mural seen here has since been painted over after the new library was built.

The Town of Chenoa was laid out on May 13, 1856, by Matthew T. Scott. At this time, the Chicago and Alton Railroad had been running trains for almost two years but the survey for the east-west Toledo, Peoria and Oquawka (soon to be the Toledo, Peoria and Western) had not reached McLean County. Scott anticipated the place where the railroads would cross and platted the town which he called Chenoa. Scott (February 24, 1828 - May 21, 1891) was the son of a Kentucky banker, and, by the time he reached Illinois, was an experienced land developer who led a group of well-financed investors. The European settlement history of Chenoa began in 1854 when Matthew T. Scott began buying thousands of acres of land in this area.

=== The Name Chenoa ===
There has been much discussion about the meaning of the name Chenoa. Mid-nineteenth century histories explain that it was a Native American word for "Kentucky" and could therefore be rendered as "Dark and Bloody Ground." Professor of linguistics Edward Callary makes it clear that this is incorrect and that this meaning is unknown in Kentucky. Others explain that Chenoa is a Cherokee word meaning "Dove" or "White Dove." Again, this is not the case. Dove in Cherokee is "woya" and white dove "unega woya." There is also the often-repeated story that Scott had originally wanted the name to read "Chenowa," but the railroad had mistakenly dropped the letter "w." This, again, is not true. The railroad had no say in the naming of Chenoa; the spelling "Chenoa" is exactly how Scott recorded the name when he first laid out the town. However, "Chenoka" or "Chenoa" is one of many Native American names for the Kentucky River and this may explain how Scott got the idea that the word could be translated as Kentucky.

=== Design of Chenoa ===
The plan of Chenoa is complex because it is the blending of two rival townsites. Scott's original town, which lies west of the railroad, was built around a central park and whose plan is much more like that of central Illinois towns of the 1830s than that of other towns laid out in the 1850s. However, Scott only owned Section 2, while his rival, and former business companion, William Marshall had purchased Section 1. Marshall's land included most of the land east of the railroad; on this land, he laid out a competing town, East Chenoa. Scott did control a small strip between the two towns which he refused to plat out into streets and lots, so anyone who tried to pass the short distance from one town to the other would be guilty of trespass. Scott would call this strip his "imaginary wall," although it was never a physical barrier. The dual nature of the platting also explains why Chenoa had two distinct streets named Lincoln. Both Scott's and Marshall's towns were orthogonal grids with north–south and east–west streets, but these plans became still more complex when a later addition by Scott included Veto Street, which ran parallel to the railroad and at an odd angle to the earlier streets.

=== Selling Chenoa ===
The first advertisement for the town of Chenoa appeared under the bold heading, "GREAT SALE OF LOTS IN THE TOWN OF CHENOA," May 15, 1856. The advertisement makes clear the advantages Scott had in mind when he selected the location of the town. It was, he wrote, "The only crossing of railroads likely to be made within McLean County within four or five years, and persons can easily ascertain that the connection of the two roads will be effected by the first of November or December." He went on to explain that, while there was no large body of timber nearby, coal will be furnished at twelve cents a bushel and cheep lumber, poplar, walnut, and oak will also be brought in by the railroad. This was a particular advantage because "... persons will come from eight or ten miles for these articles, bringing along their grain, making loads with both ways - carrying back coal, sometimes for themselves, again for their neighbors." If anyone would build a house worth $400 to $500 within six months of buying a lot, they could have two years of credit on the sale price, interest-free. Scott was willing to take a quarter interest in a steam saw mill and would donate sites for churches, schools and burial grounds. Moreover, anyone who sold liquor in the town would forfeit the title to their property.

=== Development of Chenoa ===
The great problem with the development of Chenoa was that, before the town was laid out, there had been no settlement in the surrounding country. The land around Chenoa was prairie wilderness. The Native Americans who had hunted and lived in Illinois country for many years had been moved by the U. S. Government to regions west of the Mississippi River by the time Chenoa was founded. Soon the tough prairie sod was broken by the plow which made acres and acres of land available for farming. Scott aided the development of nearby land by plowing and cultivating 16,000 acres (65 km^{2}), building two hundred houses, and planting twenty-seven miles of hedge fences. The first structures within the limits of the new town were two little half-sod and half-board dugouts which served as depot, freight house, and shelter for railroad section hands; this is one of the very few mentions of sod houses in McLean County. J. B. Lenney came from Pennsylvania to the new town of Chenoa and in 1855 put up the frame building here which was called "The Farmer's Store." J. B. Lenney took an active part in the development of the town and is referred to as the "Father of Chenoa." In 1856, the National Hotel was constructed. All of these buildings were on the east side of the tracks. In 1864, Chenoa, East Chenoa, and several additions were united under one town government which was confirmed by a special act of the Illinois General Assembly in 1869.

=== Development continues ===
Slowly, additional improvements were made. Rectangular blocks of stone were placed at road intersections. Changes in livestock laws made it possible for residents to tear down the wooden fences that had once surrounded every residence. Many trees were planted. The Chicago and Alton was double-tracked in 1890. In 1891, the first electric lights were installed. A union station was built so both railroads could share passenger facilities; unfortunately, it burned down during Armistice celebrations on November 11, 1918. This was not the town's only serious conflagration: in the July of 1894, the entire business district east of the railroad burned down; very few of the buildings were insured. Railroad traffic peaked in 1911, when twenty-four trains arrived. After that, automobile and truck traffic slowly replaced trains, and Chenoa became a stop on Route 66. Two currently active businesses in the city are notable due to their longevity: Schuirman's Drug Store (now Chenoa Pharmacy) and Union Roofing. Several small manufacturers operate in Chenoa and a number of antique dealers are Chenoa-based. Chenoa was once home to two competing grain elevators. The last one was demolished in late December, 2020. Chenoa is now the headquarters of the Bright Stalk Wind Farm.

== Geography ==
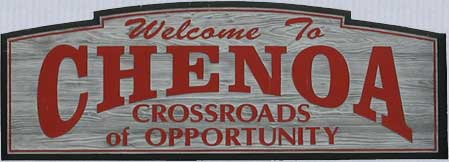
Signage upon entering Chenoa.

According to the 2020 census, Chenoa has a total area of 2.475 square miles (6.41 km^{2}), of which 2.43 square miles (6.29 km^{2}) (or 98.18%) is land and 0.045 square miles (0.12 km^{2}) (or 1.82%) is water.

Situated in McLean County, the area surrounding Chenoa boasts some of the richest soil in the world. Only patches of farmland in Argentina, southern Ukraine and along the Yellow River in China match the fertile ground that covers much of the northern half of Illinois, particularly a high-yielding band through the state's midsection. McLean County is traditionally the state's leading corn and soybean producer.

=== Historical landmarks ===
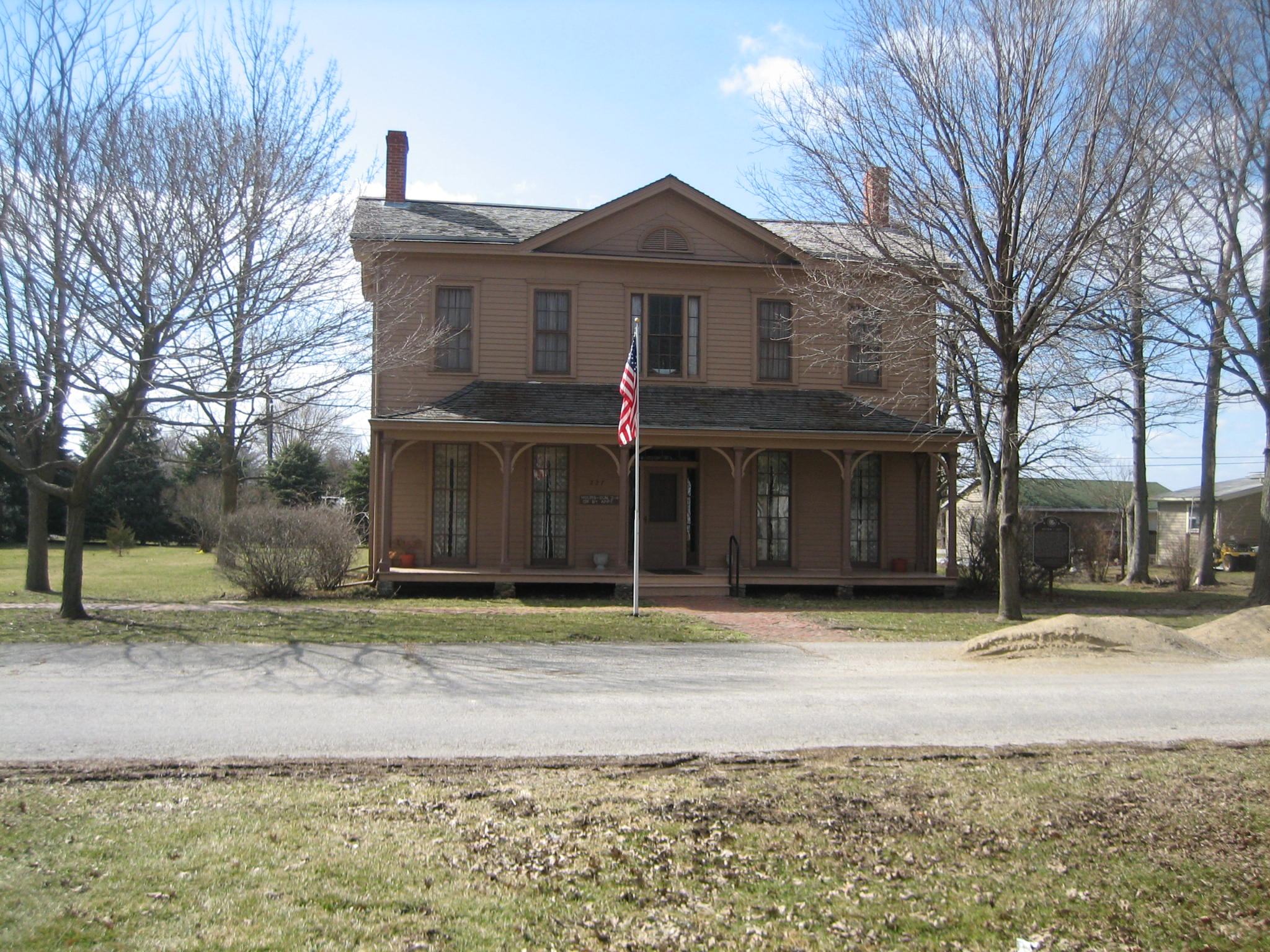
The Matthew T. Scott House

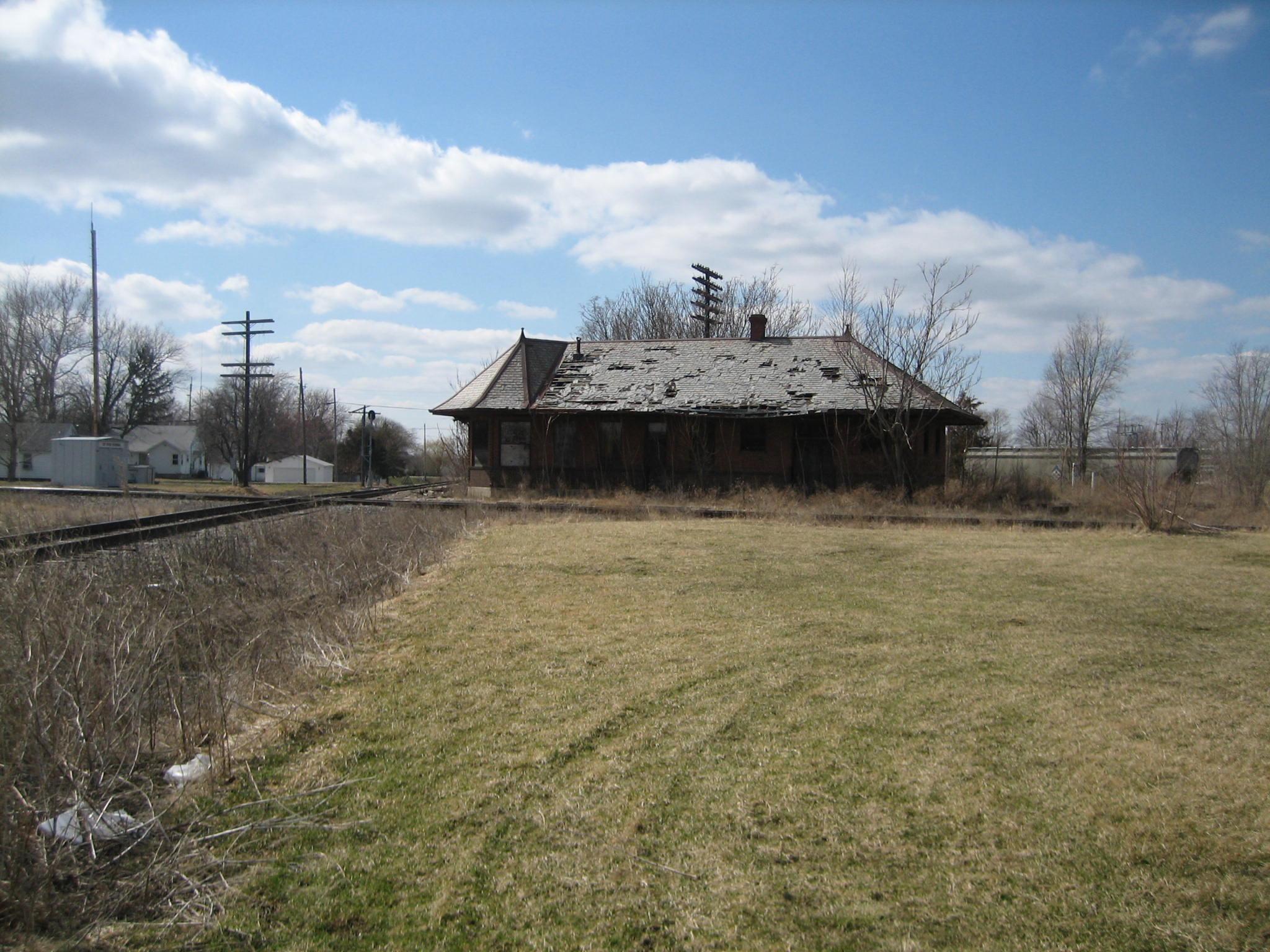
A crumbling rail station in Chenoa. The depot has since been torn down, apparently during fall 2009.

The Matthew T. Scott House was built as a home for Matthew T. Scott, who promoted and developed much of the surrounding area. It is closely associated with many events in the history of Chenoa. What appears today to be one building is, in fact, a blending of two structures. The oldest part is at the rear of the house and was built in 1855 as a post and I-beam cottage. The more formal front of the house was added in 1863 and is a true balloon frame structure built around a central hall with an impressive staircase. The foundation of both is of Joliet dolomite. It was here that the first Adlai E. Stevenson I (1835–1914), who held many important government positions and would become the 23rd Vice President of the United States from 1893 to 1897, courted Scott's sister-in-law, Letitia Green; their wedding took place in this house in 1866.

By 1980, the house was in poor condition and seemed likely to be demolished. It was then bought and restored by Mrs. Elizabeth Stevenson Ives, a great niece of Matthew T. Scott. In 1982 it was placed on the National Register of Historic Places.

=== Climate ===
Chenoa has a Humid continental climate (Köppen climate classification Dfa), with hot, humid summers and cold, slightly drier winters. The frost-free Growing season averages 173 days.

Climate data for Chenoa, Illinois (1991–2020 normals, extremes 1951–present)
Month	Jan	Feb	Mar	Apr	May	Jun	Jul	Aug	Sep	Oct	Nov	Dec	Year
Record high °F (°C)	67 (19)	73 (23)	85 (29)	91 (33)	96 (36)	102 (39)	105 (41)	103 (39)	100 (38)	92 (33)	79 (26)	72 (22)	105 (41)
Mean daily maximum °F (°C)	31.7 (−0.2)	36.5 (2.5)	49.2 (9.6)	62.4 (16.9)	73.4 (23.0)	81.7 (27.6)	83.9 (28.8)	82.3 (27.9)	77.1 (25.1)	64.4 (18.0)	48.9 (9.4)	36.7 (2.6)	60.7 (15.9)
Daily mean °F (°C)	23.4 (−4.8)	27.7 (−2.4)	39.0 (3.9)	50.8 (10.4)	62.0 (16.7)	70.8 (21.6)	73.4 (23.0)	71.5 (21.9)	65.2 (18.4)	53.4 (11.9)	40.0 (4.4)	29.0 (−1.7)	50.5 (10.3)
Mean daily minimum °F (°C)	15.2 (−9.3)	18.8 (−7.3)	28.8 (−1.8)	39.1 (3.9)	50.6 (10.3)	59.9 (15.5)	63.0 (17.2)	60.7 (15.9)	53.3 (11.8)	42.4 (5.8)	31.0 (−0.6)	21.3 (−5.9)	40.3 (4.6)
Record low °F (°C)	−25 (−32)	−22 (−30)	−6 (−21)	7 (−14)	22 (−6)	36 (2)	45 (7)	37 (3)	24 (−4)	17 (−8)	−4 (−20)	−26 (−32)	−26 (−32)
Average precipitation inches (mm)	2.17 (55)	1.59 (40)	2.68 (68)	3.57 (91)	4.52 (115)	3.81 (97)	3.74 (95)	3.17 (81)	3.13 (80)	3.23 (82)	2.63 (67)	2.03 (52)	36.27 (921)
Average snowfall inches (cm)	5.3 (13)	4.8 (12)	2.3 (5.8)	0.8 (2.0)	0.0 (0.0)	0.0 (0.0)	0.0 (0.0)	0.0 (0.0)	0.0 (0.0)	0.0 (0.0)	1.3 (3.3)	5.4 (14)	19.9 (51)
Average precipitation days (≥ 0.01 in)	6.5	4.8	7.8	10.5	11.1	9.1	8.1	7.6	6.9	8.9	8.1	6.6	96.0
Average snowy days (≥ 0.1 in)	2.8	2.5	1.5	0.4	0.0	0.0	0.0	0.0	0.0	0.0	0.8	3.1	11.1
Source: NOAA

== Demographics ==
Historical population
Census	Pop.	Note	%±
1880	1,063		—
1890	1,226		15.3%
1900	1,512		23.3%
1910	1,314		−13.1%
1920	1,311		−0.2%
1930	1,325		1.1%
1940	1,401		5.7%
1950	1,452		3.6%
1960	1,523		4.9%
1970	1,860		22.1%
1980	1,847		−0.7%
1990	1,732		−6.2%
2000	1,845		6.5%
2010	1,785		−3.3%
2020	1,720		−3.6%
Decennial US Census

=== 2020 census ===
As of the 2020 census, Chenoa had a population of 1,720. The median age was 41.7 years. 21.7% of residents were under the age of 18 and 17.9% of residents were 65 years of age or older. For every 100 females there were 104.5 males, and for every 100 females age 18 and over there were 99.1 males age 18 and over.

0.0% of residents lived in urban areas, while 100.0% lived in rural areas.

There were 725 households in Chenoa, of which 26.9% had children under the age of 18 living in them. Of all households, 50.6% were married-couple households, 19.6% were households with a male householder and no spouse or partner present, and 22.6% were households with a female householder and no spouse or partner present. About 29.7% of all households were made up of individuals and 12.9% had someone living alone who was 65 years of age or older.

There were 804 housing units, of which 9.8% were vacant. The homeowner vacancy rate was 1.9% and the rental vacancy rate was 12.5%.

Racial composition as of the 2020 census
Race	Number	Percent
White	1,556	90.5%
Black or African American	15	0.9%
American Indian and Alaska Native	1	0.1%
Asian	9	0.5%
Native Hawaiian and Other Pacific Islander	0	0.0%
Some other race	28	1.6%
Two or more races	111	6.5%
Hispanic or Latino (of any race)	84	4.9%

=== 2000 census ===
As of the 2000 census, there were 1,695 people, 790 households, and 451 families residing in the city. The population density was 1,472.2 inhabitants per square mile (568.4/km^{2}). There were 768 housing units at an average density of 612.8 per square mile (236.6/km^{2}). The racial makeup of the city was 94.24% White, 1.85% African American, 0.00% Native American, 0.65% Asian, 1.50% from other races, and 1.75% from two or more races. Hispanic or Latino of any race were 2.60% of the population.

There were 790 households, out of which 34.2% had children under the age of 18 living with them, 62.8% were married couples living together, 7.6% had a female householder with no husband present, and 26.4% were non-families. 23.0% of all households were made up of individuals, and 12.2% had someone living alone who was 65 years of age or older. The average household size was 2.59 and the average family size was 3.03.

In the city, the population was spread out, with 27.6% under the age of 18, 6.4% from 18 to 24, 29.4% from 25 to 44, 21.5% from 45 to 64, and 15.0% who were 65 years of age or older. The median age was 36 years. For every 100 females, there were 97.5 males. For every 100 females age 18 and over, there were 91.5 males.

The median income for a household in the city was $44,420, and the median income for a family was $50,948. Males had a median income of $35,821 versus $21,361 for females. The per capita income for the city was $19,559. About 4.6% of families and 5.7% of the population were below the poverty line, including 7.7% of those under age 18 and 6.7% of those age 65 or over.

== Notable people ==
- Stan Albeck, basketball head coach for various teams, was born in Chenoa
- Lewis Stevenson, Illinois secretary of state was born in Chenoa
- Marty Roberts, disc jockey (DJ), songwriter, TV personality and actor
