= Gridley, Illinois =

- Village
- Location in McLean County, Illinois
- Coordinates: 40°44′51″N 88°52′35″W
- Country: United States
- State: Illinois
- County: McLean
- Township: Gridley

Area
  - Total: 1.23 sq mi (3.19 km^{2})
  - Land: 1.23 sq mi (3.19 km^{2})
  - Water: 0 sq mi (0.00 km^{2})
- Elevation: 755 ft (230 m)

Population (2020)
  - Total: 1,456
  - Density: 1,181.2/sq mi (456.05/km^{2})
- Time zone: UTC-6 (CST)
  - Summer (DST): UTC-5 (CDT)
- ZIP code: 61744
- Area code: 309
- FIPS code: 17-31732
- GNIS ID: 2398210
- Website: villageofgridley.org

Gridley is a village in McLean County, Illinois, United States. The population was 1,456 at the 2020 census. It is part of the Bloomington–Normal Metropolitan Statistical Area.

The village of Gridley was founded in 1869 and named after General Asahel Gridley, a noted early Republican, land investor, political backer and client of Abraham Lincoln, and a descendant of a Colonel Gridley who served at the Battle of Lexington.

== History ==
=== Founding ===
Gridley was laid out on November 25, 1856, by Thomas Carlyle (c. 1832 - ?) and George Washington Kent (1820–1901). After considering the names "Kent", "Carlyle", and "Gardner", for the governor of Massachusetts, it was decided to name the town for Bloomington banker, lawyer, and land developer Asahel Gridley (1810–1881). Both Carlyle and Thomas were working for Gridley at the time the town was founded, and two years after the town was laid out Gridley purchased all of it. Along with many other towns in central Illinois, the town was established when the Peoria and Oquawka Railroad crossed the state from west to east. The railroad soon became the Toledo Peoria and Western.

=== Original design and the "Depot Grounds" ===
At first glance the original town of Gridley looks like many towns laid out along new railroads built in central Illinois in the 1850s. In addition to the 100-foot-wide (30 m) strip granted to the railroad, there were long narrow rectangles on both the north and south sides of the tracks. In most cases these areas, usually labeled "Depot Grounds", have evolved into parks or been put to other public uses. At Gridley, half of the northern Depot Ground was dedicated as a long narrow "Public Square". The remaining "Depot Grounds" would soon cause problems for the town. The remainder of the town was a fairly conventional grid of north–south and east–west streets. There were 33 blocks, most containing ten or sixteen lots. The town grew quite rapidly. Gridley then surprised everyone by announcing that he was re-platting the entire town and subdividing the land near the railroad. He argued that although the plat did say "depot grounds" he had never actually dedicated the land to the railroad or to public use. By that time the railroad and private individuals had built on the railroad grounds and the people of Gridley had used them as a location for the town jail. Gridley asked the courts to eject other people from his land. The case known as Gridley v. Hopkins eventually worked its way up to the Illinois Supreme Court, which sustained Gridley but ultimately left the others with their buildings. It became an important legal precedent and left a long legacy of local bitterness toward Gridley.

=== Early development ===
The early growth of Gridley was rapid. On February 28, 1857, the first train arrived in Gridley. A small depot building was erected on the north side of the tracks. J.M. Mitchell built the first store on the corner just north of the depot. A small house and blacksmith shop was built south of the railroad. Charles Cochrane George Washington Kent, the town's co-founder, moved to Gridley. There was a brief setback in 1858 when a tornado swept through the town, damaging Cochrane's and Kent's house and twisting the newly laid rails, but growth quickly resumed. Kent built the first grain elevator. He then enlisted in the Union Army, serving first as sergeant and then lieutenant. Upon his return he guided the town through additional growth; among other things he dug up trees along the Mackinaw River and hauled them to town where they were planted in public square. In 1884 Fred Donner established a tile factory. It was first incorporated as a town under a special charter. By 1900 the town had a population of 735.

=== Fire of 1901 ===
On Saturday, May 4, 1901, a fire destroyed most of downtown Gridley. The afternoon of May 3 had been hot and windy. At 3:40 in the afternoon smoke was seen rising from the alley behind Cohn's store. There had been a serious fire in July 1891, and the town seemed well prepared, with several cisterns and a dedicated force of volunteer fire fighters. Soon stores along both sides of Center Street were engulfed in flame. Water was pumped from several cisterns and then hoses were run to the flooded pit of the tile factory. All of the able bodied people in town, and many from the surrounding countryside, joined in the fire fighting effort. The state bank and many other structures burned to the ground. A message was telegraphed to Peoria for help, but before it could arrive the blaze had subsided. Damage was estimated at $100,000, a severe blow for a small town. Rebuilding quickly began.

=== Later history ===
Until the third decade of the twentieth century, Gridley had been a railroad town; in the early 1920s six passenger trains in both directions served the town. Then, in June 1924, the newly paved Route 8, today US-24, was opened. The hard road quickly destroyed rail passenger traffic. In 1925 it was announced that the depot would be closed on Sundays. In 1929 all passenger traffic ended. One of the more tragic episodes in Gridley's history took place on September 3, 1946. Striking railway workers had attempted to shut down the Toledo Peoria and Western Railroad. In response the railroad loaded a train with fourteen workers and four armed guards who were tasked with keeping the tracks open. Striking workers followed the train in automobiles, driving along U.S. Route 24, which paralleled the tracks. Whenever the train slowed it was pelted with rocks. At Gridley the train stopped and a gun battle erupted. When it was over, two workers were dead and three were wounded. A jury later found that the guards were acting in self-defense, and were therefore innocent. However, for the most part Gridley was peaceful, with a flourishing civic life. The Fourth of July was celebrated with races. There were Saturday night band concerts in the park, which by the 1940s had given way to free movies. Many recreational improvements were made. For example, in 1937 the old clay pits from the tile factory were bought by the town for use as a skating rink, and in 2001 the Gridley Telephone Museum opened.

== Geography ==
Gridley is located in northern McLean County, with its northern border the Livingston County line. U.S. Route 24 crosses the southern part of the village, leading west 7 miles (11 km) to El Paso and east 8 miles (13 km) to Chenoa. Gridley is about halfway between Interstate 39 to the west and Interstate 55 to the east. Bloomington, the McLean county seat, is 22 miles (35 km) to the south.

According to the U.S. Census Bureau, Gridley has a total area of 1.23 square miles (3.19 km^{2}), all land. It sits on a rise that drains south toward Buck Creek and northwest toward the East Branch of Panther Creek. Both streams run to the Mackinaw River, a west-flowing tributary of the Illinois River.

== Demographics ==
Historical population
Census	Pop.	Note	%±
1880	419		—
1890	474		13.1%
1900	716		51.1%
1910	750		4.7%
1920	720		−4.0%
1930	709		−1.5%
1940	745		5.1%
1950	817		9.7%
1960	889		8.8%
1970	1,007		13.3%
1980	1,246		23.7%
1990	1,304		4.7%
2000	1,411		8.2%
2010	1,432		1.5%
2020	1,456		1.7%
Decennial US Census

=== 2020 census ===
As of the 2020 census, Gridley had a population of 1,456. The median age was 37.3 years. 29.9% of residents were under the age of 18 and 16.8% of residents were 65 years of age or older. For every 100 females there were 95.2 males, and for every 100 females age 18 and over there were 94.1 males age 18 and over.

0.0% of residents lived in urban areas, while 100.0% lived in rural areas.

There were 559 households in Gridley, of which 37.0% had children under the age of 18 living in them. Of all households, 55.5% were married-couple households, 15.7% were households with a male householder and no spouse or partner present, and 25.0% were households with a female householder and no spouse or partner present. About 27.9% of all households were made up of individuals and 13.4% had someone living alone who was 65 years of age or older.

There were 614 housing units, of which 9.0% were vacant. The homeowner vacancy rate was 2.7% and the rental vacancy rate was 9.6%.

Racial composition as of the 2020 census
Race	Number	Percent
White	1,350	92.7%
Black or African American	20	1.4%
American Indian and Alaska Native	0	0.0%
Asian	7	0.5%
Native Hawaiian and Other Pacific Islander	0	0.0%
Some other race	7	0.5%
Two or more races	72	4.9%
Hispanic or Latino (of any race)	41	2.8%

=== 2000 census ===
As of the census of 2000, there were 1,411 people, 550 households, and 387 families residing in the village. The population density was 1,215.6 inhabitants per square mile (469.3/km^{2}). There were 569 housing units at an average density of 490.2 per square mile (189.3/km^{2}). The racial makeup of the village was 97.73% White, 0.28% African American, 0.14% Native American, 0.50% Asian, 0.07% Pacific Islander, 0.14% from other races, and 1.13% from two or more races. Hispanic or Latino of any race were 0.71% of the population.

There were 550 households, out of which 34.4% had children under the age of 18 living with them, 60.2% were married couples living together, 7.3% had a female householder with no husband present, and 29.6% were non-families. 27.6% of all households were made up of individuals, and 15.5% had someone living alone who was 65 years of age or older. The average household size was 2.57 and the average family size was 3.16.

In the village, the population was spread out, with 28.6% under the age of 18, 6.9% from 18 to 24, 27.7% from 25 to 44, 21.3% from 45 to 64, and 15.5% who were 65 years of age or older. The median age was 37 years. For every 100 females, there were 97.3 males. For every 100 females age 18 and over, there were 92.4 males.

The median income for a household in the village was $46,458, and the median income for a family was $51,908. Males had a median income of $36,818 versus $25,625 for females. The per capita income for the village was $19,752. About 5.9% of families and 6.4% of the population were below the poverty line, including 9.6% of those under age 18 and 4.6% of those age 65 or over.

== Notable people ==
- Wilbur J. Cash (1887–1956), banker, farmer, and politician; born in Gridley
- Helen F. Holt (1913–2015), Secretary of State of West Virginia; born and raised in Gridley
- Lynn C. Sieberns (1889–1962), member of the Illinois Senate from 1933 to 1941
