= Bloomington Central Business District =

Historic district in Illinois, United States

- U.S. National Register of Historic Places
- U.S. Historic district
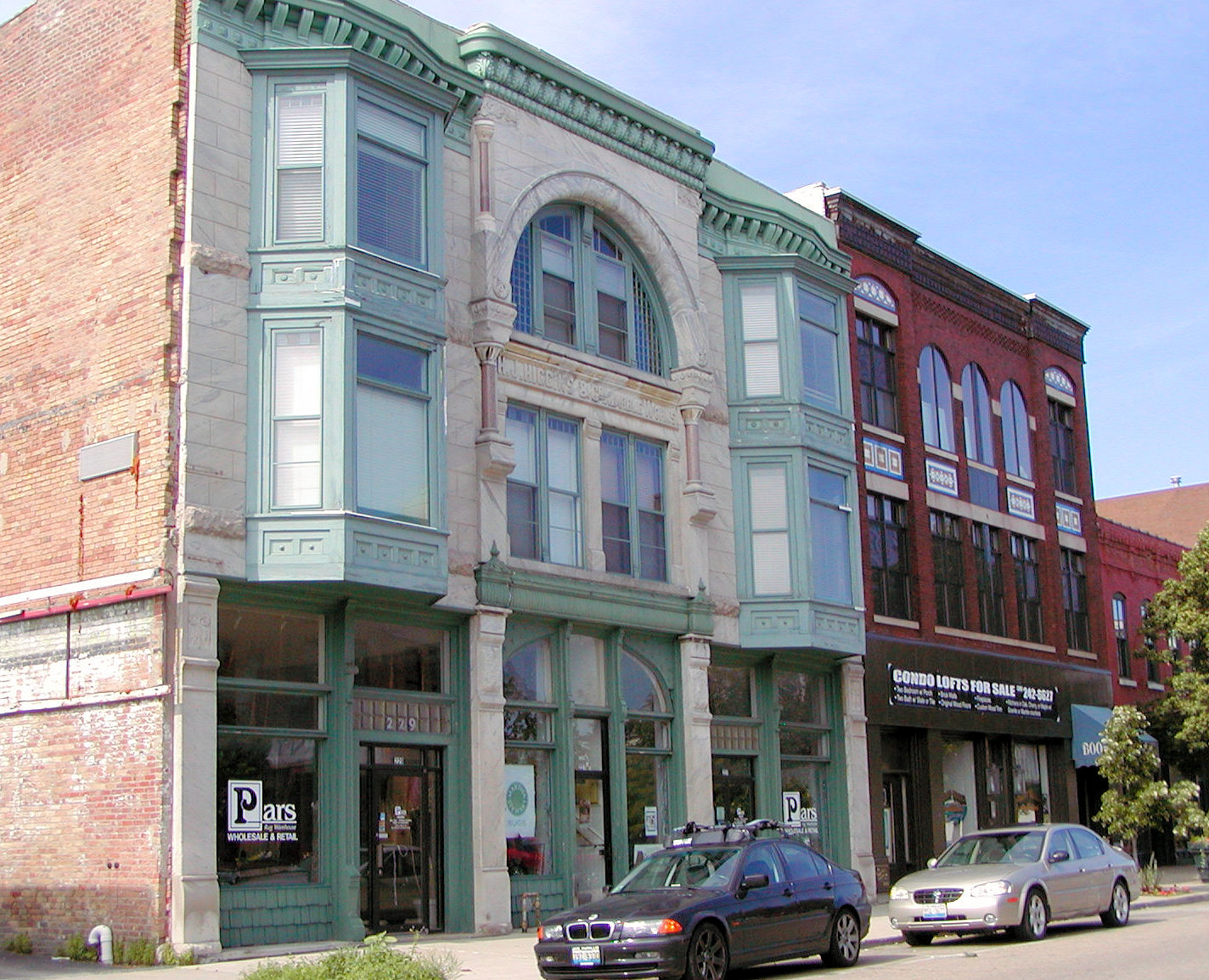
- Marble company

- Location within Illinois
- Location: Roughly bounded by Main, Center and Front Sts., Bloomington, Illinois
- Coordinates: 40°28′43″N 88°59′39″W
- Area: 34 acres (14 ha)
- Built: Various
- NRHP reference No.: 85000363
- Added to NRHP: February 28, 1985

The Bloomington Central Business District is a historic district in downtown Bloomington, Illinois. The district includes roughly twelve square blocks of the city and encompasses 140 buildings, 118 of which are contributing buildings to the district's historic character. The 1901 McLean County Courthouse, the center of government of McLean County, is the focal point of the district. The other buildings in the district were built between 1842 and 1942 and are primarily commercial. The Miller-Davis Law Buildings, two of the oldest buildings in the district, were built in 1843 and represent the early period of Bloomington's development. Bloomington's commercial core grew rapidly during the 1850s and 1860s after two railroads opened in the city; while the 1854 Gridley Bank is the only surviving pre-1857 building from this period, several more remain from the later part of the boom. The city continued to grow, and its business district continued to expand, from 1860 until 1900; however, a fire destroyed much of its downtown in 1900. Several buildings in the district date from the rebuilding period of the early 1900s.

The district was added to the National Register of Historic Places on February 28, 1985.
