= Miller–Davis Law Buildings =

- Miller-Davis Law Buildings
- U.S. National Register of Historic Places
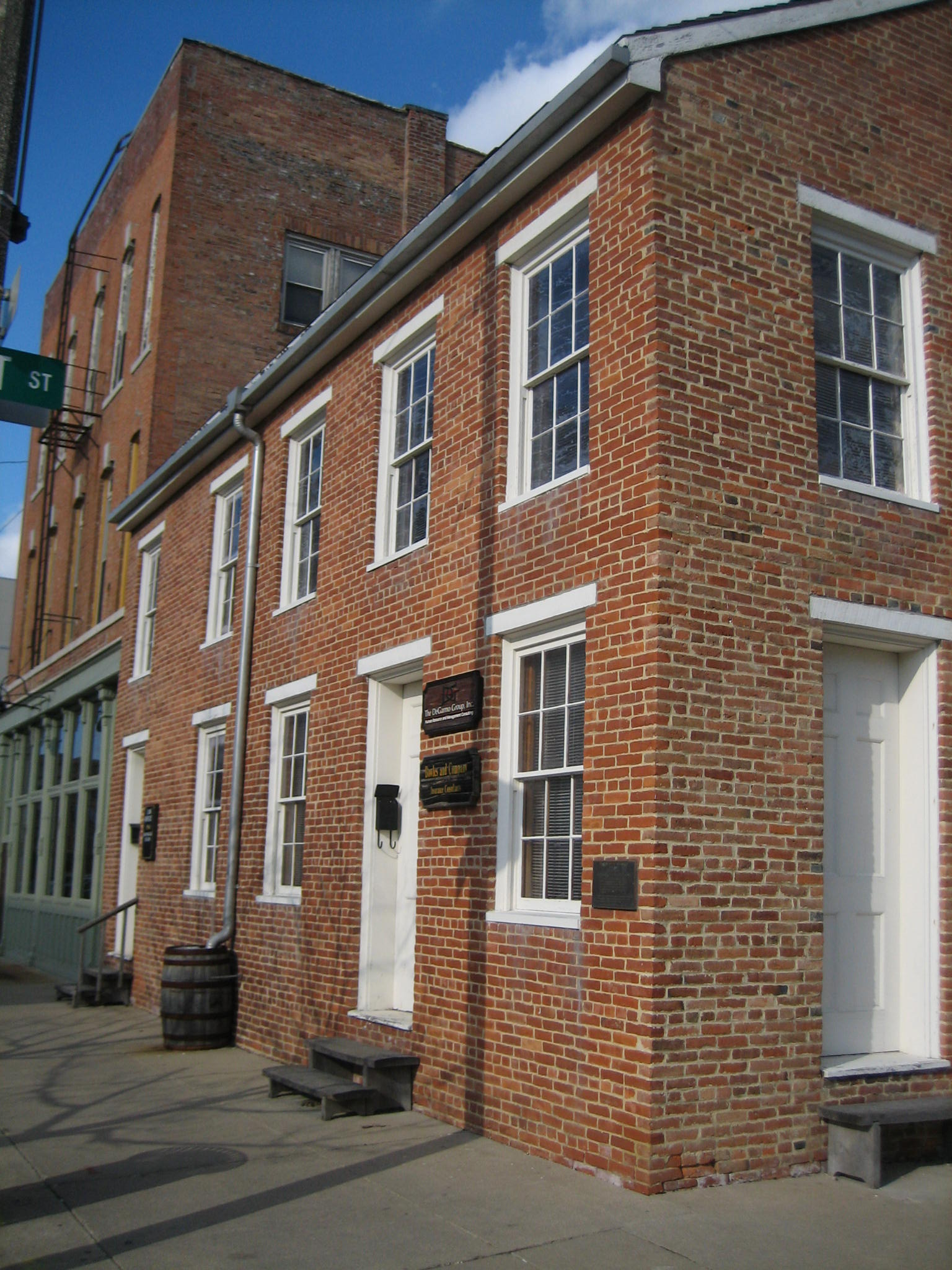

- Location within Illinois Location within the United States
- Interactive map showing the location for Miller-Davis Law Buildings
- Location: 101-103 N. Main St. and 102-104 E. Front St., Bloomington, Illinois
- Coordinates: 40°28′39″N 88°59′1″W
- Area: 0.4 acres (0.16 ha)
- Built: 1848
- NRHP reference No.: 79003162
- Added to NRHP: April 27, 1979

The Miller–Davis Law Buildings, known commonly as the Miller Davis Building, are located on Main and Front Street in the McLean County, Illinois city of Bloomington. The law offices served future Supreme Court Justice David Davis and future Illinois State Senator Asahel Gridley. The buildings became a gathering place for local lawyers such as Abraham Lincoln and Stephen A. Douglas.

== History ==
Even before the construction of the Miller–Davis Law Buildings in Bloomington, Illinois, the street corner of Main and Front Streets were a popular political rallying point. Stephen A. Douglas and David Davis debated Congressional elections here in 1840. The Miller–Davis Law Buildings were the second and third brick buildings in Bloomington, completed in 1843. Future Illinois Treasurer James T. Miller, a local businessman and land speculator, financed their construction. James Goodheart, William T. H. Miller and Squire Lawrence were tasked with its construction. They are the oldest buildings in the Bloomington Central Business District and the only examples of non-residential 1840s architecture in McLean County.

The office buildings were used by some of the state's most prominent lawyers. The first floor of the Miller building was used as a pharmacy while the second floor was used as law offices. David Davis financed an addition to this building for his own purposes. He practiced law here until he was named to the Illinois Circuit Courts in 1848. Asahel Gridley and John M. Scott practiced in the Miller offices starting in 1848. Among the lawyers known to have met with Davis, Scott, and Gridley are Joshua R. and Jesse W. Fell, William W. Orme, Ward Hill Lamon, James T. Miller, Leonard Swett, Stephen A. Douglas, and Abraham Lincoln.
