= Florence Fifer Bohrer =

American politician

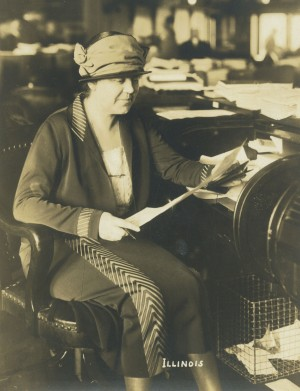

Member of the Illinois Senate from the 26th district
- In office 1924–1932
- Preceded by: Frank Hanson
- Succeeded by: Lynn C. Sieberns

Personal details
- Born: January 24, 1877 Bloomington, Illinois
- Died: July 20, 1960 (aged 83)
- Party: Republican
- Spouse: Jacob Bohrer

Florence Fifer Bohrer (January 24, 1877 in Bloomington, Illinois – July 20, 1960) was an American activist and politician in Illinois. She was the daughter of former Illinois governor Joseph W. Fifer and was the first female senator in the Illinois General Assembly. She served for two terms from 1924 to 1932.

== Early life ==
Florence Fifer was the youngest of three children born to Gertrude and Joseph Fifer in Bloomington, Illinois. She lived on Franklin Square until her father was elected as Illinois governor in 1889. That year, the family moved to Springfield, Illinois. Florence first became interested in politics after listening to her father's discussions with fellow politicians, such as Richard J. Oglesby, David Davis and Jesse W. Fell.

When she was 15 years old, Florence attended the Hillside Home School in Spring Green, Wisconsin (incorrectly titled the Unitarian Hillside School by her in a later article). After graduating in 1895, she returned to Bloomington. Shortly after coming home, she met Jacob Bohrer, who taught Latin, Greek and German languages at Illinois State University while studying law at Illinois Wesleyan University. They married on May 5, 1898. Their first child, Joseph, was born in 1899 and their second child, Gertrude, was born in 1901.

After marrying, Florence became an active member of the community. She was on the committee that founded the Bloomington Country Club and was a member of the Amateur Musical Club. She also formed the "Mother's Club," which eventually merged with the national Parent-Teacher Association.

In 1910, Florence's daughter contracted tuberculosis. Seeing the need for a local sanitarium, she formed the McLean County Tuberculosis Association with four other community members. Florence began traveling across McLean County, educating citizens on the symptoms of tuberculosis and checking children's health with the help of a nurse. Florence was successful in her efforts, and a sanitarium opened on August 17, 1919. Additionally, in response to concerns about children's health, the county initiated a hot lunch program in rural schools. Florence continued her involvement in the community, serving as chairman on the committee to create a new Girls Industrial Home in 1917, as well as chairman for the Home Service Committee for the Red Cross during World War I.

== Political life ==
During Florence's sanitarium lobbying, she became acquainted with numerous citizens of McLean County. In 1924, four years after the passing of the Nineteenth Amendment, a few friends suggested she run for the Illinois Senate because she was well known in the community and was the most qualified woman to run. Her candidacy was announced on January 25, 1924. Her platform included progressive welfare work, balancing power between Chicago and downstate, and lessening taxation. Florence's friend, Sara Forsyth, became her campaign manager, and women in the county formed the Florence Fifer Bohrer Club to support her campaign. She succeeded in defeating the current Senator Frank Hanson in the primary election.

In the fall elections, Florence's campaign focused on increasing law enforcement, the protection of agricultural interests, and the reduction of taxes. She won the election by a two to one margin. Before leaving home for Springfield, her father advised her, "Never forget that the welfare of the state is more important that the welfare of your political party." The day Florence was officially seated in the senate, sixty members of the Florence Fifer Bohrer Club and approximately 600 other women from across the state traveled to Springfield to witness the event.

Florence served on numerous committees in the senate, including ones related to charity, civil service, the economy, and public safety. She introduced and sponsored multiple bills, such as the Dance Hall Bill, which limited the operation of dance halls, a bill that opened the way for a state park system in Illinois, and a bill that made "Illinois" the official state song. Florence also introduced the Midwife Bill, which would have provided training and state licensing for midwives. It was not voted into law. She also sponsored 20 bills related to child welfare, half of which became law.

In 1932, Florence ran for senate for a third time. The recent death of her husband and mother hindered her ability to campaign, and support for the Republican Party was waning. Democratic candidate L. C. Sieberns defeated Fifer Bohrer. She returned to Bloomington, and became chairman of the McLean County Emergency Relief Office. Additionally, the Florence Fifer Bohrer Club was converted into a League of Women Voters chapter, and Florence served as president. She was elected to the National League Board in 1936.

In 1934, Florence was awarded the Bloomington Community Service Award and in 1945 the Illinois Welfare Association recognized her for her service in social action and justice.
