= John M. Scott =

American judge

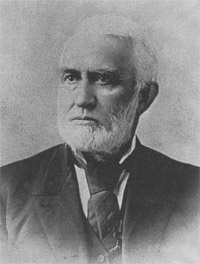

Justice of the Supreme Court of Illinois
- In office 1870–1888
- Preceded by: David Davis
- Succeeded by: Jacob W. Wilkin

Judge of the 8th Circuit Court
- In office 1862–1870

Personal details
- Born: August 1, 1824 Belleville, Illinois
- Died: January 21, 1898 (aged 74) Bloomington, Illinois
- Party: Republican
- Spouse: Charlotte A. Perry
- Profession: Attorney, judge

John Milton Scott (August 1, 1824 – January 21, 1898) was an American attorney, judge, politician and philanthropist from Illinois. Although he did not win election to the Illinois Senate from Bloomington, Illinois, he served on both the Illinois Circuit Courts (1862-1870) and the Supreme Court of Illinois (1870-1888), including three one-year terms as chief justice. The trust he established in his will funded the first hospital in Bloomington and continues to fund local healthcare today.

== Early life ==
John Milton Scott was born on August 1, 1824, in Belleville, Illinois. His parents were wealthy and could afford to send Scott for private schooling. Scott studied law in Belleville under Kinney & Bissell.

== Career ==
Admitted to the bar in 1848, Scott moved to McLean County to establish a law practice with Asahel Gridley in the Miller–Davis Law Buildings. A year later he was elected county school commissioner, a position that he held until 1852. Scott also owned and managed several farms in the Bloomington area. He also served as Bloomington city attorney before being elected judge of the McLean County court. Scott admired the political philosophies of Daniel Webster and thus affiliated himself with the Whig Party. When the party dissolved in the 1850s, Scott became a Republican. He was nominated by the party for the Illinois Senate in 1856, but lost narrowly to William C. Goudy.

In 1862, Bloomington judge David Davis was elected Associate Justice of the United States Supreme Court, thus creating a vacancy in the 8th Circuit Court. Scott was appointed to fill the unexpired term, then won election to a full term. In 1870, the Constitution of Illinois was amended; one of the amendments expanded the Supreme Court of Illinois. The Illinois bar convened that July and selected Scott as one of the new justices. He was re-elected by his district by a large margin in 1879, but declined to seek re-election to a third nine-year term in 1888. Scott served three times as Chief Justice (1875, 1882, and 1886). His most notable decision may have been Ker v. Illinois, upholding the conviction of a thief kidnapped by the Pinkerton Detective Agency after fleeing to Peru. The United States Supreme Court upheld his decision. In 1887 he wrote the opinion upholding several of the convictions of anarchists in the Haymarket Affair, which was also upheld by the U.S. Supreme Court, despite ongoing public and historical controversy concerning the trial judge and police (with many allegations of fabricated evidence). Judge Scott also wrote a dissent in Dimick v. Chicago and Northwestern Railroad, 96 Ill. 49 (1880), disagreeing with the court's other justices followed a recent decision of the Indiana Supreme Court and allowed the railroad a new trial in a case involving a farmer killed by a no-whistle train at an unguarded and brush-obstructed road crossing on his farm.

== Personal life ==
Scott married Charlotte A. Perry, the Pennsylvania-board daughter of a Presbyterian minister, in 1853. They had two children, but both died before reaching three years. The Scotts adopted and raised another daughter. Judge Scott enjoyed reading in his free time and owned a large collection of books.

== Final years and death ==
After retiring from the court, Scott traveled. He also wrote two books, and helped found the McLean County Historical Society in 1892 (and remained its president until his death). Scott died in Bloomington on January 21, 1898, and was buried in Evergreen Memorial Cemetery. His will directed that part of his estate be used to establish a hospital; the trust to support local healthcare still exists today but local courts have twice revised its terms to account for changed circumstances. His papers are held by the McLean Historical Society, now the McLean County Museum of History and housed since 1991 in the former 8th Circuit courthouse where Judge Scott once worked (a more modern facility having been constructed for the judiciary in 1976).

Political offices
Preceded by David Davis	Justice of the Illinois Supreme Court; 1862–1888	Succeeded by Jacob W. Wilkin
