= McLean County Courthouse and Square =

- McLean County Courthouse & Square
- U.S. National Register of Historic Places
- U.S. Historic district
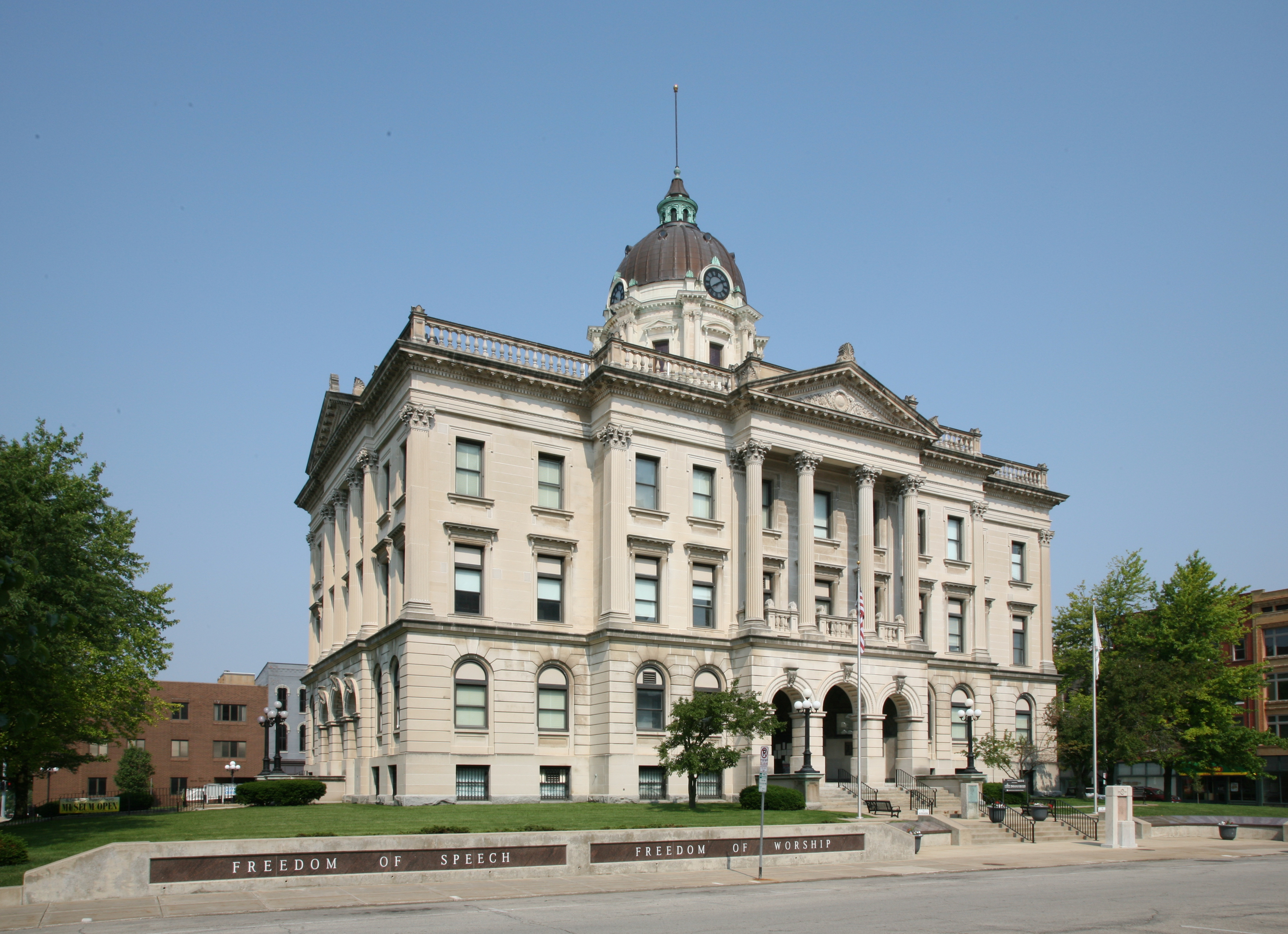
- The old McLean County Courthouse, 2013

- Location within Illinois Location within the United States
- Interactive map showing the location of McLean County Courthouse & Square
- Location: Main, Washington, Center, and Jefferson Sts., Bloomington, Illinois
- Coordinates: 40°28′39″N 88°59′1″W
- Area: 0.7 acres (0.28 ha)
- Built: 1903 (courthouse)
- Architectural style: Classical Revival
- NRHP reference No.: 73002160
- Added to NRHP: February 6, 1973

The McLean County Courthouse and Square is located in downtown Bloomington, Illinois. The site is on the National Register of Historic Places and encompasses the old McLean County Courthouse and the courthouse-facing sides of three downtown blocks. All 4 floors of the building are now occupied by the McLean County Museum of History for exhibits, collections storage, and offices. The historic buildings at the other side of the square were destroyed by fire in the 1980s. The Square is bordered by four Bloomington streets: Main Street, Center Street, Jefferson Street and Washington Street. The site was home to three previous courthouses before the current one was completed in 1903. The first courthouse at the site was built in 1831, and the second in 1836. The third was built in 1868, but suffered major damage from fire on June 19, 1900.

== History ==
=== Courthouse ===
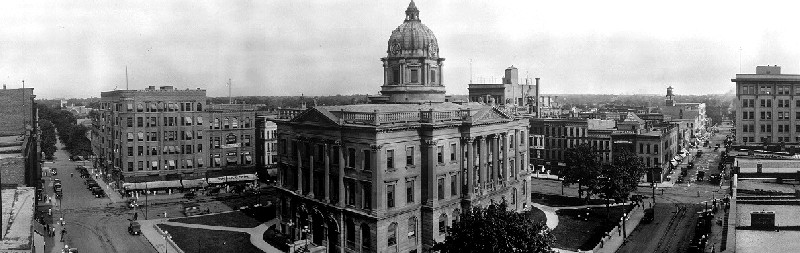
Downtown Bloomington and the McLean County Courthouse & Square are seen in this 1914 image.

The McLean County Courthouse housed the McLean County Circuit Court from 1903 to 1976. The original construction was completed in 1868 at a cost of $461,640. On June 19, 1900, a fire destroyed many of the buildings in the square and the courthouse. The courthouse was rebuilt in 1903 in a similar style following the fire. It was designed by William Reeves and John M. Baile of the Peoria firm Reeves and Baile. The rebuild of many buildings in the downtown was executed through the designs of several local architects, George Miller, Paul Moratz and A.L. Pillsbury.

The original courthouse after the catastrophic 1900 fire

In 1988, the McLean County Historical Society moved to put its museum in the Old Courthouse. Today the museum operates out of the courthouse building as it has since 1991. Until 1991, general county offices were still housed in the courthouse though the courts had moved to new facilities a few blocks away. In 2002 McLean County approved $1.2 million for renovation following a historic structures report. Other funding came through a Public Museum Capital Grant from the Illinois State Museum, a division of the Illinois Department of Natural Resources. The project included restoration of the 100-year-old courthouse dome. Original copper was salvaged and reused and the clock restored to working order. On December 24, 2004, the tower bell was rung for the first time in nearly fifty years. The dome was restored from its oxidized copper green to the original copper color.

On October 15, 2006, the Landmark Preservations Council of Illinois presented the "Outstanding Restoration" award to the McLean County Museum of History for its efforts to restore the dome of the old courthouse.

=== Square ===
The historic sides of the square are on the west, south and north sides of the courthouse, respectively. The east side of the public square was destroyed in a 1985 fire and today a contemporary office building occupies the area. The remaining historic sides are littered with historic commercial buildings which originate from the 1850s to the 1920s. The Corn Belt Bank Building at 101 W. Jefferson St. was completed in 1903, and was designed by George Miller who also designed the nearby Livingston Building, 102–104 W. Washington St.

=== Buildings on the Courthouse Square ===
- Benjamin & Shermerhorn Building: 210 N. Center St., completed 1857.
- Corn Belt Bank Building: 101 W Jefferson St., completed 1903.
- Dewenters Building (Crothers & Crew Building): 118 W. Washington St., completed c. 1856.
- Ensenberger Building: 212 N. Center St., completed 1926.
- Livingston Building: 102–104 W. Washington St., completed 1903.
- People's Bank Building:
- Phoenix Block (Kersey H. Fell Building): 106–108 W Washington St., buildings completed c. 1856.

==== Benjamin & Shermerhorn Building ====
The Benjamin & Shermerhorn building was built in 1857 by contractor S.G. Rounds. The building was originally built as a dry goods store which was operated by Edward Benjamin and John Shermerhorn. Their store occupied the first floor of the three-story building. The store was the beneficiary of excellent basement storage conditions resulting from a well that was struck during construction which provided a natural cooling system for the perishables the store carried. The building has had other notable tenants during its history as well. The Bloomington newspaper, The Pantagraph, was housed on the building's third floor until 1868. The paper, during this period in its history, was known as a radical "black republican" paper because of its stance on slavery and support for Abraham Lincoln. A local loan broker, Henry Capen & Sons, occupied the second floor from 1886 until 1926. The building's longest tenant, however, was W.B. Read and Co., a stationery and book company that started on the first floor and 1895 and later moved to occupy the entire building until the owner, William Read's, death in 1951. In 1952 Osco Drugs took over the building and the pharmacy later expanded into the connected Marblestone Building next door.

==== Dewenters Building ====
This building, on West Washington Street, is one of three buildings built by Dr. Eli Crothers around the year 1856. During their early years the buildings, including the Dewenters building served as offices for prominent Bloomington doctors and lawyers, including William Ormes and Leonard Swett, who pioneered the insanity defense for accused criminals. The building got its name, Dewenters, from the time when it housed the Dewenter and Co. men's clothing store for more than a century of its existence. Dewenter and Co. was founded by Herman Dewenter and William Krietzer in 1847 and moved to the Dewenter Building in 1870 where it stayed until 1988. The Dewenter family owned the store until 1946 but it retained its name even after its sale to new owners.

==== Ensenberger Building ====
The seven-floor Ensenberger Building, at 212 N. Center St., was completed in 1926 at a cost of $250,000. The building was the home of Bloomington icon Ensenberger Furniture from its opening until the time it closed in 1995. The furniture store was started in 1879 by Gustave A. Ensenberger and operated by his descendants until its closure. An estimated 40,000 visitors toured the building during the week following its grand opening with people coming from as far away as New York and California.

==== Livingston Building ====
The 1903 six-story Livingston Building is considered the first "skyscraper" to be built in Bloomington because of its status as the first steel frame construction building in Illinois outside of Chicago. The building was built at a cost of $36,000. The building was home to the Livingston and Sons department store for the first eleven years of its history until the store was relocated just down the block. Between 1927 and 1969 a Walgreens Drug Store and a number of legal and insurance businesses occupied the building. The Livingston was well known for its roof garden during the early 1900s which was the site of many dances and musical performances.

==== Phoenix Block ====
The Phoenix Block is a collection of buildings at 106–108 West Washington St. Today, only two of the original four buildings that made up the Phoenix Block remain. The Phoenix Block was so dubbed by the Daily Pantagraph as a remark on how quickly the buildings rose from the ashes after a fire in 1855. Originally, the buildings' upper floor served as offices for lawyers who tried cases in the original wood-frame courthouse. The Kersey H. Fell Building of 1856 is one of downtown Bloomington's oldest structures. The Fell Building housed the office of local attorney Kersey Fell. His second floor office is the place where it is claimed that Jesse Fell first suggested to Abraham Lincoln he should run for president. Aside from the law offices the third floor once housed the Illinois Natural History Museum, in 1857, which was one of the first museums in Illinois. The storefronts have been home to numerous merchants over the years. From 1905 to 1922 Homuth Jewelry had a location along the block and Sorg's Jewelers had a location on the Phoenix Block from 1946 until 1988. In addition five other jewelers have had businesses along this block at some point in its past.

== Architecture ==
=== Courthouse ===
The Old McLean County Courthouse is an example of high style architecture and is well preserved. The architecture conveys strong messages of stability, antiquity and importance. The courthouse is built in the American Renaissance style. The exterior is clad in limestone and of solid masonry construction. The plan is rectangular and symmetrical and is executed in the Corinthian order. From the roof rise a limestone drum and a copper dome which are said to be modeled after St. Peter's Basilica in Rome. The east and west faces of the building are home to the principal elevations. They feature three story porticos, a Corinthian pediment, balustrade caps and the cornice. The building's windows are decorated with Doric surrounds.

The architects wanted the building to give Bloomington residents the feeling that the courthouse belonged to them. To encourage this feeling the entrances on all four sides of the building are identical, a way to welcome people from all directions. Wanting to balance the feeling of symmetry with a sense of power Reeves and Baile created an identical hierarchy in each facade through the use of an entrance arch, enhanced vertically by columns and topped off with a pediment. The exterior also makes use of many balustrades in the roof and other levels on the exterior. Also included are detailed egg-and-dart molding, and hood molding.

The Old Courthouse interior is composed of quadrants which are set apart by broad hallways which meet at the building's center. There they form a large, open three story rotunda. The rotunda is the dominating feature of the interior. It rises over 100 feet into the air and at the top features an allegorical painting representing peace and prosperity. The halls have mosaic floors and wall treatment composed of white marble dado which is capped with antique verde serpentine stone. Marbleized plaster, scagliola, panels complete the walls. The building's ceilings are decorated with plaster cornices and molded leaf and rosette complements. The Honduras mahogany doors have a rail and panel design and beveled glass is used for decorative side lights and panels.

This postcard from the early 20th century shows the McLean County Courthouse.

The courthouse's upper stories are reached by a broad white marble stairway. It features bronze fish-scale screens which are decorated with laurel wreaths, the same type of screen closes the rails around the rotunda opening. Inside the rooms are sand cast plaster cornices and a variety of floor finishes which include mosaic, marble and maple. The original stenciling in the rooms has been lost to the past. The three original courtrooms are decorated with frescoes, marble dadoes and scagliola. The original fresco remains in the Stevenson-Ives library. Other notable architectural features include many beveled and leaded glass panels, scagliola door surrounds, solid bronze wall partitions, a number of original bronze, combination gas and electrical light fixtures and marble counters.

=== Square ===
==== Benjamin & Shermerhorn Building ====
The Bejamin & Shermerhorn Building was designed by Rudolph Richter and completed in 1857. It is designed in the Italianate Style a has a pressed brick facade, arched windows and a dentil crown.

==== Dewenters Building ====
This building is cast in the Greek Revival building style and utilizes flat stone lentils and sills on the windows. The building is topped by dentils near its roof line. Also known as Crothers & Crew Building. In the early 1990s the building was restored by architect Russel Francois for use as an architectural office (now Scharnett Associates Architects). During this renovation the third floor was converted into a contemporary apartment and studio.

==== Ensenberger Building ====
The Ensenberger Building was designed by local architect Arthur Pillsbury in an eclectic interpretation of the Art Deco Style. It was to be the last building designed by Pillsbury and one he would never see open as he was killed in an automobile accident in October 1925. The building included a six-room, fully furnished Spanish-style bungalow on the seventh floor when it opened in 1926. The bungalow had white stucco walls and arched windows and doorways. The original design of the building include gothic spires on the roof which gave the building a much less Art Deco appearance than it has today. The spires were removed in 1941 to give the building a more modern feeling. At one time there were plans to replace the terra cotta panels on the east facade with stainless steel panels. The WWII steel shortage stopped those plans and the terra cotta panels remain one of the building's most prominent features.

==== Livingston Building ====
This steel structured "skyscraper" was designed by Bloomington architect George Miller and is an example of Chicago Style architecture. The design incorporates many elements which would later be connected to what is now called the Sullivanesque Style, after Louis Sullivan. Sullivan concentrated on many of design elements seen in the Livingston Building. On its north and east side the building is decorated with pressed metal oriels. The lower base of the building makes use of columns and is top is ornamented by a detailed cornice. The Livingston Building's oriels are arranged in a curtain wall where they are located on the building. Above the first story the windows are flanked by pressed metal spandrels and the third through sixth floors are clad in red brick. One of the oriels faces Washington Street and two face Main Street. The windows are supported by terra cotta brackets and the upper spandrels are ornamented with terra cotta paneling.

==== Phoenix Block ====
The two remaining original buildings on the Phoenix Block, one of which is the Kersey H. Fell building, are done in the Greek Revival style of architecture. They share a common wall and use simple stone lentils and sills in the windows. The storefronts are accented by columns. The common wall helped to increase the speed which the Phoenix Block was constructed at. So eager were merchants to occupy the storefronts that several stores opened for business while workers were still constructing the second and third floors of the buildings.
