= Fell Arboretum =

Arboretum located in Normal, Illinois

Coordinates: 40.5108°N 88.9935°W

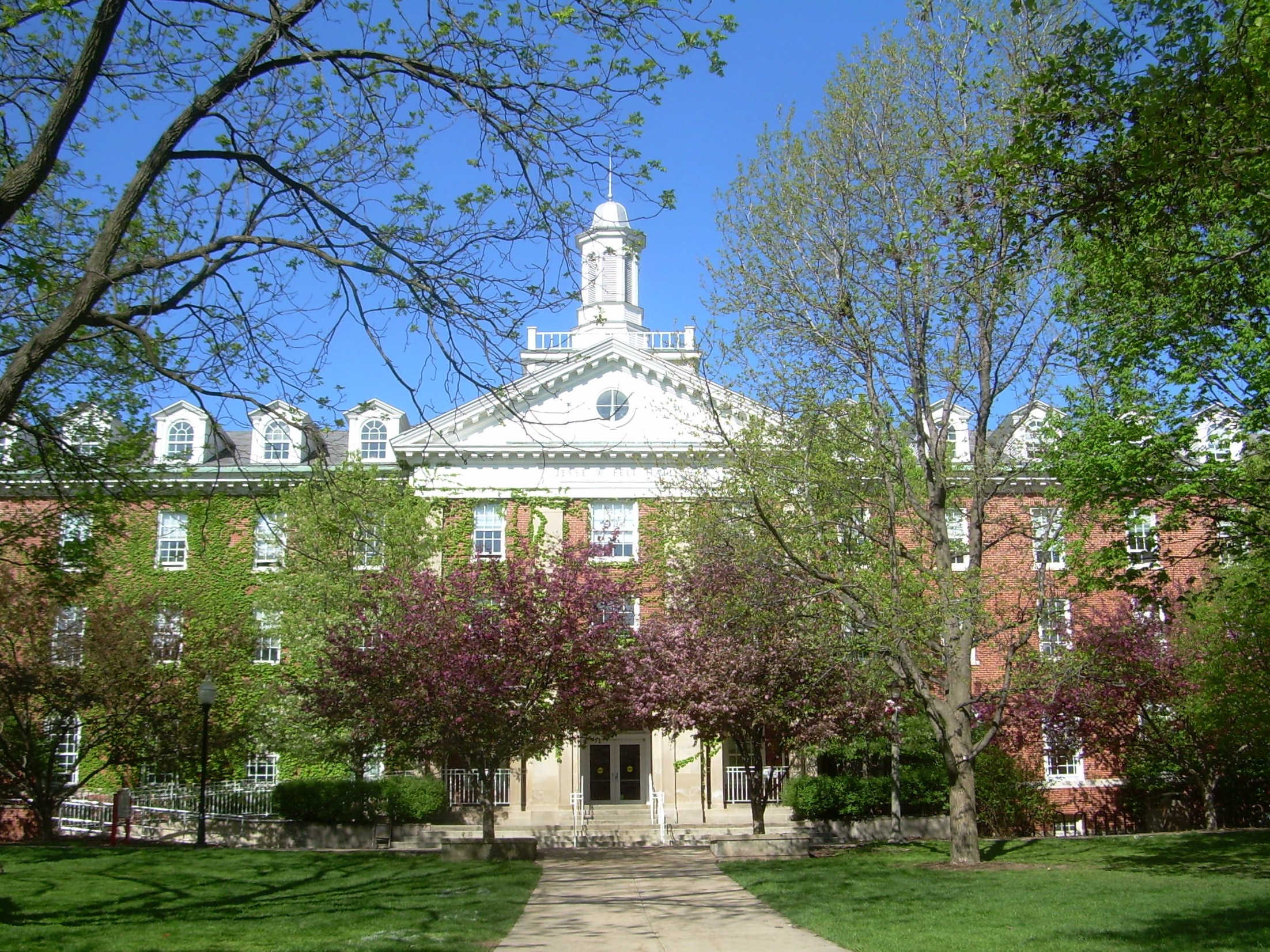
- A variety of species of trees grace the walk to Fell Hall, seen here in early spring.
- Interactive map of Fell Arboretum
- Location: Illinois State University
- Nearest city: Normal, Illinois
- Area: 490 acres (200 ha)
- Created: 1858
- Founder: Jesse W. Fell

The Fell Arboretum is an arboretum located across the campus of Illinois State University in Normal, Illinois.

== History ==
Early plans for the arboretum began in 1858 when Jesse W. Fell, founder of Illinois State University, contacted landscape designer William Saunders (botanist). Saunders planned a layout for what would eventually become The Quad for the university's campus.

In 1867, Jesse Fell obtained $3,000 from the state legislature for campus landscaping. Fell planted 1,740 trees on campus that year and 107 trees the following year. An enthusiastic tree planter, Fell wished the campus to contain every tree native to Illinois. In 1995 the campus was formally registered as an arboretum and named in Fell's honor.

The arboretum is an ArbNet Level II accredited arboretum.

== Samples ==
The arboretum contains over 4,000 trees representing over 100 varieties. Each tree is numbered, marked, and mapped. species represented include:

- Abies concolor
- Acer ginnala
- Acer griseum
- Acer platanoides
- Acer rubrum
- Acer saccharum
- Aesculus glabra
- Aesculus x carnea
- Alnus glutinosa
- Amelanchier arborea
- Aralia spinosa
- Betula alleghaniensis
- Betula nigra
- Betula populifolia
- Broussonetia papyrifera
- Carpinus caroliniana
- Carya illinoinensis
- Castanea mollissima
- Catalpa speciosa
- Celtis occidentalis
- Cercidiphyllum japonicum
- Cercis canadensis
- Cladrastis kentukea
- Cornus mas
- Cotinus obovatus
- Crataegus crus-galli
- Crataegus mollis
- Crataegus monogyna
- Diospyros virginiana
- Eucommia ulmoides
- Fagus sylvatica
- Fraxinus americana
- Fraxinus pennsylvanica
- Ginkgo biloba
- Gleditsia triacanthos
- Gymnocladus dioicus
- Halesia carolina
- Juglans nigra
- Juniperus virginiana
- Larix decidua
- Liquidambar styraciflua
- Liriodendron tulipifera
- Magnolia acuminata
- Magnolia stellata
- Magnolia x soulangiana
- Malus coronaria
- Malus cultivar
- Malus ioensis
- Malus sargentii
- Morus alba
- Nyssa sylvatica
- Phellodendron amurense
- Picea abies
- Picea glauca
- Picea pungens
- Pinus mugo
- Pinus nigra
- Pinus resinosa
- Pinus strobus
- Pinus sylvestris
- Platanus occidentalis
- Populus alba
- Prunus padus
- Prunus serotina
- Pseudotsuga menziesii
- Pyrus calleryana
- Quercus alba
- Quercus bicolor
- Quercus coccinea
- Quercus hybrid
- Quercus imbricaria
- Quercus macrocarpa
- Quercus palustris
- Quercus rubra
- Sassafras albidum
- Taxodium distichum
- Tilia americana
- Tilia cordata
- Tsuga canadensis
- Viburnum prunifolium
- Zelkova serrata

== See also ==
- List of botanical gardens in the United States
