= Callsen =

Callsen is a surname. Notable people with the surname include:

- Jan-Ingwer Callsen-Bracker (born 1984), German former professional footballer
- Katrina Callsen, American politician from Virginia
- Lynn Callsen Sieberns (1889 ― February 23, 1962), American politician from Illinois

== See also ==
- Karsten
