= Asahel Gridley =

American politician

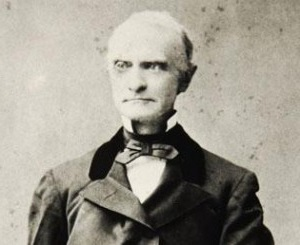

Member of the Illinois Senate from the 11th district
- In office 1850 – 1854
- Preceded by: Edward O. Smith
- Succeeded by: Jacob C. Davis

Member of the Illinois House of Representatives
- In office 1840 – 1842

Personal details
- Born: April 21, 1810 Cazenovia, New York
- Died: January 25, 1881 (aged 70) Bloomington, Illinois
- Party: Whig
- Profession: Banker, lawyer, and merchant

Asahel Gridley (April 21, 1810 – January 25, 1881) was an American politician, lawyer, merchant, and banker. Born in New York, Gridley moved to Bloomington, Illinois, when he was twenty-one. He served as a brigadier general in the Black Hawk War and was elected to three terms in the Illinois General Assembly. There, he lobbied to have the Illinois Central and Chicago and Alton Railroads pass near Bloomington. Abraham Lincoln once defended Gridley during a slander trial and was a frequent collaborator or opponent in the courts. Gridley is also the namesake of Gridley, Illinois, and platted two other McLean County towns.

== Biography ==
Asahel Gridley was born on April 21, 1810, in Cazenovia, New York. Educated at Pompey Academy, Gridley moved west in 1831 and settled in Bloomington, Illinois, on October 8. He engaged in the mercantile trade with his brother-in-law Ortogrul Covel. Gridley donated $338 to establish the first courthouse in McLean County. With the outbreak of the Black Hawk War, Gridley enlisted in the cavalry, assisting General Merritt L. Covel with raising a cavalry company. Gridley was named Covel's first lieutenant and was soon brevetted to brigadier general.

During the 1840 presidential election, Gridley campaigned on behalf of William Henry Harrison and ran for a seat on the Illinois House of Representatives. He was elected and served in the 12th General Assembly (1840–1842). Gridley successfully lobbied the assembly to have the Illinois Central Railroad build a train station within two miles of Bloomington. Gridley owned much of the land around the station and became very wealthy by selling it to the company. In the meantime, he practiced law with John M. Scott in the Miller–Davis Law Buildings. He frequently appeared opposed to or in association with Abraham Lincoln.

Gridley returned to politics in 1850, when he was elected to the Illinois Senate from the 11th district. He was re-elected to a second two-year term in 1852. Again, Gridley used his influence to include Bloomington on a rail line, this time for the Chicago and Alton Railroad. He retreated from politics after the dissolution of the Whig Party in the 1850s.

During his Senate career, he became acquainted with J. Young Scammon, who encouraged him to start his own bank. Gridley founded the McLean County Bank in 1853 with Scammon and J. H. Burch, later purchasing the interests of the other investors. In November 1856, Gridley commissioned Thomas Carlyle and George W. Kent to plat a town north of Bloomington. In his honor, Carlyle and Kent named the new settlement Gridley, Illinois. Gridley himself laid out two towns near Bloomington: Le Roy and Lexington. Gridley purchased the Bloomington Gas Light and Coke Company in 1857. Gridley died in Bloomington on January 25, 1881, and is buried in Evergreen Memorial Cemetery.

Asahel Gridley is the namesake of Gridley Township in McLean County, Illinois.

=== Personal life ===
Gridley married Mary Ann Enos on March 18, 1836, whom he met during purchasing excursions in New York City, New York, and Philadelphia, Pennsylvania. They had twelve children: Juliet, Albert, Mary, Edward, Diana, Sharon, Asahel Jr., Emily, Grace, Oliver, Rachel, and David. Gridley had an irascible personality and frequently argued with dissenters such as David Davis. In one such instance, a Bloomington businessman sued Gridley for slander. Gridley hired Abraham Lincoln as his defense and won the case; Lincoln argued that Gridley's words could not be slander because everyone knew that Gridley spoke that way.
