= Tilbury Flash =

American single-seat monoplane

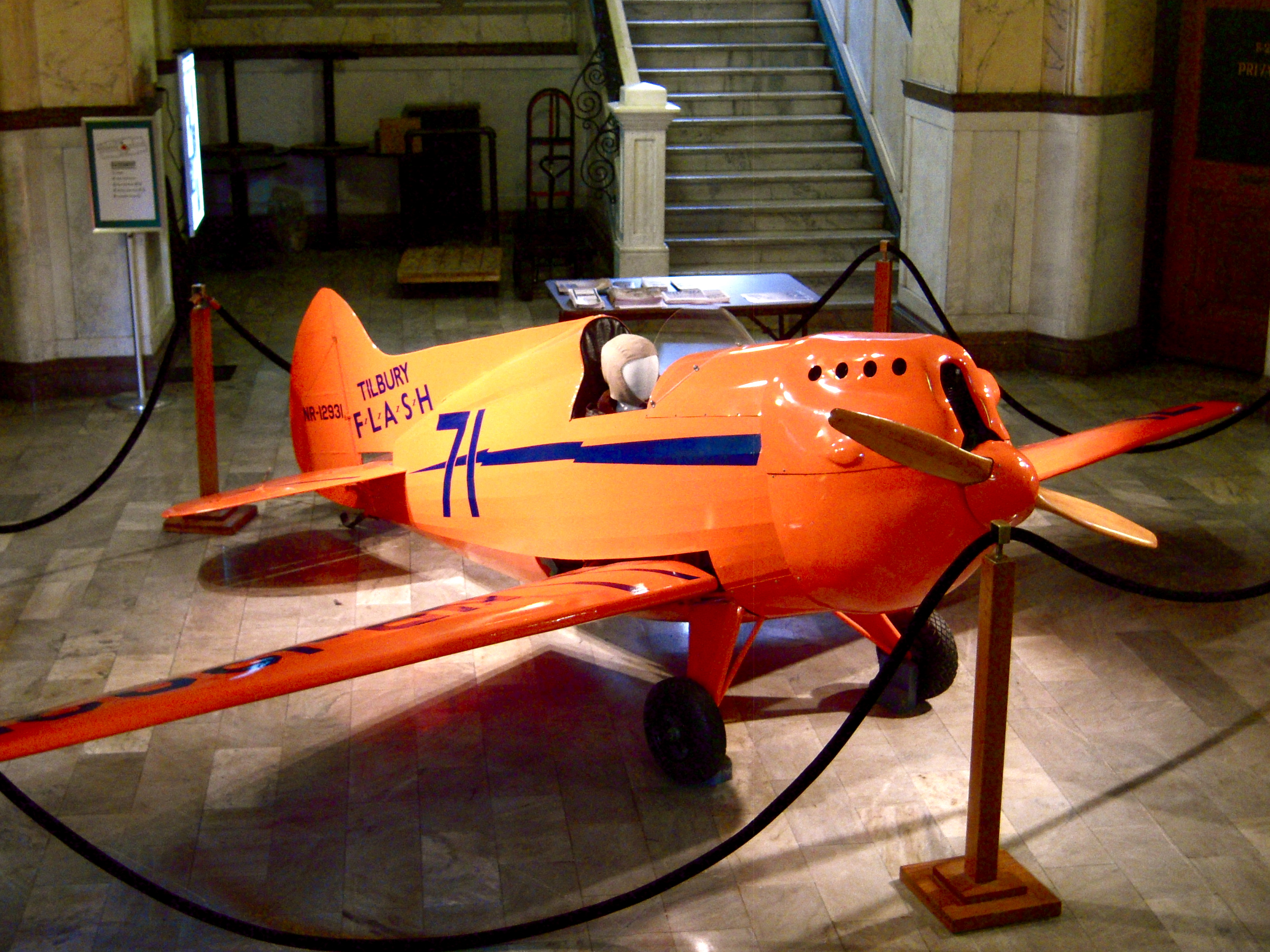

General information
- Type: Racing monoplane
- National origin: United States
- Designer: Owen Tilbury
- Status: Preserved
- Number built: 1

History
- First flight: 1932

The Tilbury Flash is a single-seat American racing monoplane designed and built in the 1930s by Owen Tilbury and Cecil Fundy. The aircraft was built in 1932 and was entered in the US National Air Races. At Cleveland, at the time it was described as probably the smallest racing aeroplane in the world.

The Flash was on display at the McLean County Museum of History in Bloomington, Illinois, but has since been removed to make room for the Cruisin' with Lincoln on 66 Visitors Center. The Flash is currently on display in the Central Illinois Regional Airport.

== Specifications ==
Data from

General characteristics

- Crew: one
- Length: 11 ft 10 in (3.61 m) later increased to 12' 5"
- Wingspan: 14 ft 8 in (4.47 m) later increased to 17' 10"
- Powerplant: 1 × Church-Henderson , 45 hp (34 kW)
