= 130th Illinois Infantry Regiment =

Union Army infantry regiment in the American Civil War

130th Regiment Illinois Volunteer Infantry
- Illinois state flag
- Active: October 25, 1862, to August 15, 1865
- Country: United States
- Allegiance: Union
- Branch: Infantry
- Engagements: Battle of Champion Hill; Battle of Big Black River Bridge; Siege of Vicksburg; Battle of Mansfield

The 130th Regiment Illinois Volunteer Infantry was an infantry regiment that served in the Union Army during the American Civil War.

== Service ==
The 130th Illinois Infantry was organized at Camp Butler, Illinois, and mustered into Federal service on October 25, 1862, for a three-year enlistment.

The regiment was mustered out of service on August 15, 1865.

== Total strength and casualties ==
The regiment suffered 2 officers and 18 enlisted men who were killed in action or who died of their wounds and 4 officers and 153 enlisted men who died of disease, for a total of 177 fatalities.

== Members ==
- Colonel Nathaniel Niles - resigned on May 6, 1864
- Major Jacob W. Wilkin, future Justice of the Supreme Court of Illinois
- Lieutenant Colonel John B. Reid - mustered out with the regiment

== See also ==
- List of Illinois Civil War Units
- Illinois in the American Civil War
