= Frank K. Dunn =

American judge

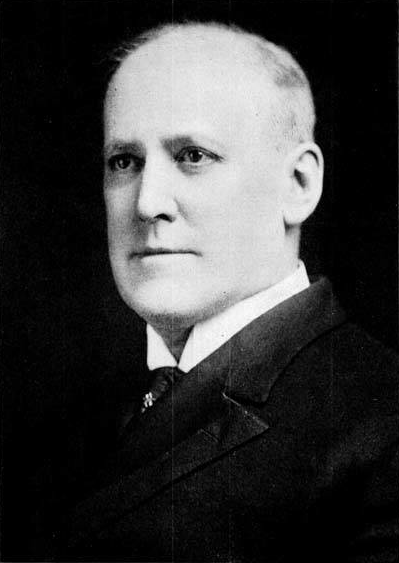

Justice of the Illinois Supreme Court
- In office 1907–1933
- Preceded by: Jacob W. Wilkin
- Succeeded by: Elwyn Riley Shaw

Illinois Circuit Court Judge
- In office 1897–1907

Personal details
- Born: Frank Kershner Dunn; November 13, 1854 Mount Gilead, Ohio, U.S.
- Died: August 8, 1940 (aged 85) Charleston, Illinois, U.S.
- Education: Harvard Law School
- Alma mater: Kenyon College
- Occupation: Lawyer, judge

Frank Kershner Dunn (November 13, 1854 – August 8, 1940) was an American lawyer and judge, who was thrice elected to the Illinois Supreme Court, serving from 1907 to 1933.

Born in Mount Gilead, Ohio, Dunn received his bachelor's degree from Kenyon College in 1873 and his law degree from Harvard Law School in 1875. Dunn was admitted to the Ohio bar and then practiced law with his father who was a judge of the Ohio Courts of Common Pleas. In 1878, Dunn moved to Charleston, Illinois where he continued to practice law. In 1897, Dunn was elected an Illinois circuit court judge. From 1907 until his retirement in 1933, Dunn served on the Illinois Supreme Court. Dunn died at his home in Charleston, Illinois after a long illness.

Political offices
Preceded by Jacob W. Wilkin	Justice of the Illinois Supreme Court; 1907–1933	Succeeded by Elwyn Riley Shaw
