= Wilbur J. Cash (politician) =

American businessman, farmer, and politician (1887–1956)

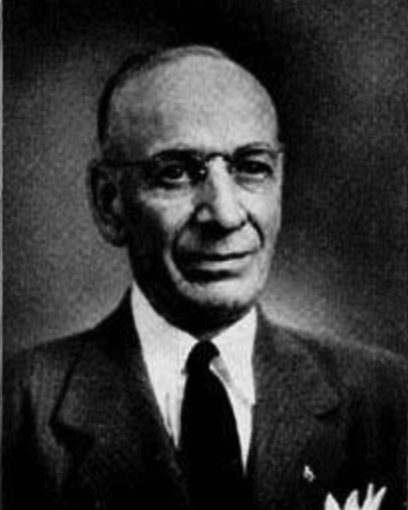

Member of the Illinois Senate from the 26th district
- In office January 1941 – January 7, 1953
- Preceded by: Lynn C. Sieberns
- Succeeded by: David Davis IV

Personal details
- Born: Wilbur James Cash; March 23, 1887 Gridley, Illinois, U.S.
- Died: June 3, 1956 (aged 69) Normal, Illinois, U.S.
- Party: Republican
- Spouse: Ruby Jones (m. 1909)

Wilbur James Cash (March 23, 1887 – June 3, 1956) was an American businessman, farmer, and politician.

Cash was born in Gridley, Illinois. He attended public schools in the area, and subsequently lived in Towanda, Illinois with wife and family. Cash was involved in the farming, merchant, and banking businesses. He served on the McLean County Board of Supervisors and was chair of the county board. He also served on the Towanda Village Board and was president of the village board. Cash also served on the school board and as the town clerk of Towanda. Cash served in the Illinois Senate during 1941 to 1953 and was as a Republican. He died at Brokaw Hospital in Normal, Illinois on June 3, 1956, after suffering from a lingering illness.
