= Jacob W. Wilkin =

American judge (1837–1907)

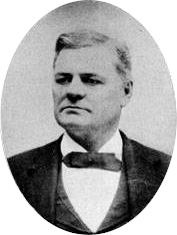

Justice of the Supreme Court of Illinois
- In office 1888–1907
- Preceded by: John M. Scott
- Succeeded by: Frank K. Dunn

Personal details
- Born: June 7, 1837 Licking County, Ohio, US
- Died: April 3, 1907 (aged 69) Danville, Illinois, US
- Party: Republican
- Spouses: Alice E. Constable (m. 1865; died 1883): Sarah E. Archer
- Children: Harry O., John Scholfield, and Jessie Bell
- Education: McKendree College
- Profession: Attorney, soldier

Military service
- Allegiance: United States
- Branch/service: 130th Illinois Volunteer Infantry Regiment
- Years of service: 1863-1865
- Rank: private, major
- Unit: Illinois militia
- Commands: Blackhawk War
- Battles/wars: Vicksburg campaign, Battle of Fort Blakeley

Jacob Wilson Wilkin (June 7, 1837 – April 3, 1907) was an American lawyer, soldier and judge, including nineteen years as a Justice (two as Chief Justice) of the Illinois Supreme Court.

== Early and family life ==
Born in Licking County, Ohio near the National Road and Newark on June 7, 1837, Jacob was the fifth of nine children born to Isaac and Sarah Wilkin. Two of his brothers would become Methodist Episcopal ministers. His family moved west to Illinois in 1845. Jacob helped on the family farm, as well as attended the local public schools. He traveled west to Lebanon, St. Clair County, Illinois to attend McKendree College, and graduated in 1862. Soon afterward, Wilkin enlisted in the Illinois militia and Union Army, as discussed below. After the war, Wilkin married, as well as began studying law under the direction of John Scholfield in Marshall, Illinois.

== Military service ==
During the Civil War. Jacob Wilkin enlisted for three years, initially as a private in the 130th Illinois Volunteer Infantry Regiment. Fellow soldiers elected him their captain, and by the time he was mustered out in August 1865, Wilkin had attained the rank of major. Wilkin fought in the Vicksburg campaign, and his company guarded General Grant. As the war ended, he was transferred to the staff of General Ransom, and fought in the Battle of Fort Blakeley in Alabama in April 1865.

== Legal career ==
Admitted to the bar in March 1867, Wilkin joined Scholfield's practice as a partner. Wilkin was a Republican and was a presidential elector during the 1872 United States presidential election. However, the following year Scholfield was elected to the Supreme Court of Illinois, ending the partnership. Wilkin continued to practice in Marshall until 1879. That year, he was elected to the 4th Illinois Circuit Court. He served until 1885, when he was elevated to the 4th District, Illinois Appellate Court. Wilkin moved to Danville, Illinois that year. In 1888, he was elected to the Supreme Court of Illinois to fill the vacancy of John M. Scott, who had declined re-election. Wilkin was re-elected in 1897 and 1906, serving a total of nineteen years. He was chief justice in 1894 and 1901.

== Personal life ==
Wilkin married Alice E. Constable, the daughter of circuit court judge Charles H. Constable (a friend turned critic of President Lincoln during the Civil War), in September 1865. They had three children: Harry O., John Scholfield, and Jessie Bell. Alice died in 1883 and Wilkin later married Sarah E. Archer. Wilkin was active in Freemasonry as a Knight Templar, 32nd degree Scottish Rite. He was also a member of the Knights of Pythias.

== Death and legacy ==
Wilkin died in Danville during his third term, on April 3, 1907, shortly before he was expected to serve as chief justice. His remains were returned for burial in Marshall Cemetery, along with his journal, titled dernier ami.

Political offices
Preceded by John M. Scott	Justice of the Illinois Supreme Court; 1888–1907	Succeeded by Frank K. Dunn
