= Towanda, Illinois =

- Village
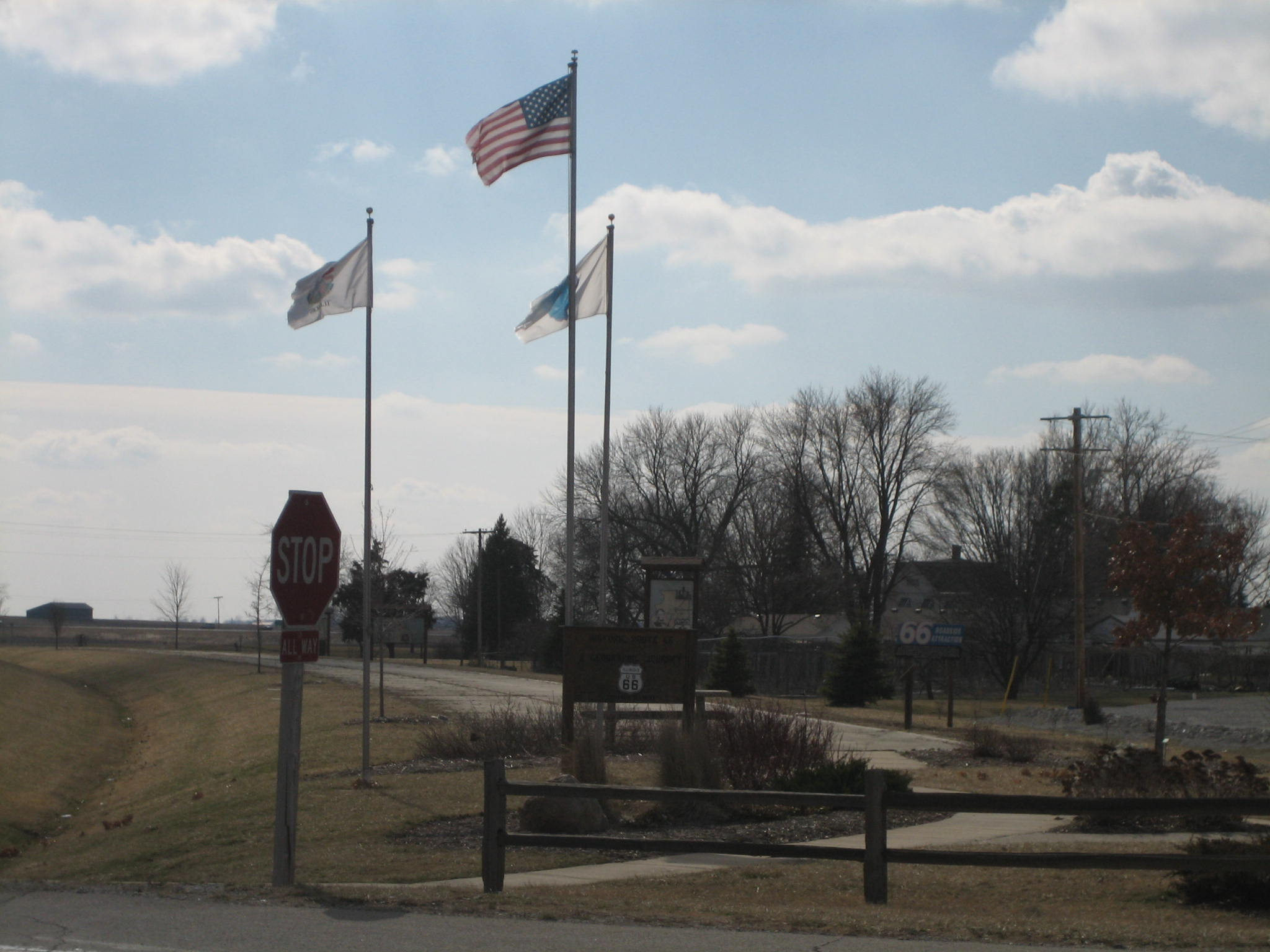
- Half of the old U.S. Route 66 roadbed is a walking trail in Towanda.

- Location in McLean County, Illinois
- Coordinates: 40°33′48″N 88°54′03″W
- Country: United States
- State: Illinois
- County: McLean
- Township: Towanda
- Founded: May 5, 1875

Area
  - Total: 0.75 sq mi (1.93 km^{2})
  - Land: 0.75 sq mi (1.93 km^{2})
  - Water: 0 sq mi (0.00 km^{2})
- Elevation: 781 ft (238 m)

Population (2020)
  - Total: 431
  - Density: 579.2/sq mi (223.62/km^{2})
- Time zone: UTC-6 (CST)
  - Summer (DST): UTC-5 (CDT)
- ZIP code: 61776
- Area code: 309
- FIPS code: 17-75822
- GNIS ID: 2399997
- Website: villageoftowanda.org

Towanda is a village in McLean County, Illinois, United States. The population was 431 at the 2020 census. It is part of the Bloomington–Normal Metropolitan Statistical Area.

== History ==
=== Origin ===
The village was named for Towanda in Bradford County, Pennsylvania. The name means "burial ground" in Nanticoke, an Algonquian language. The land on which Towanda stands was first entered by Charles Badeau who had graduated from Wesleyan University, Middletown, Connecticut, in 1840, and was employed as the assistant to the chief engineer of what was then the Alton and Springfield Railroad (now part of the Union Pacific system). Because in Illinois at that time it was illegal for railroads or their officials to establish new towns, much of the land was then transferred to two McLean County real estate developers, Jesse W. Fell (1808 – 1887) and Charles W. Holder (1819 - 1900). These two men laid out the town of Towanda and filed the plat on December 7, 1854.

Fell, a native of Chester County in southeastern Pennsylvania, was a widely known land dealer in central Illinois who played a major role in founding many towns in the region, including Clinton, Dwight, Normal, and Pontiac, and who was the driving force behind the establishment of the school that would become Illinois State University. Holder was linked with Fell in many of his town founding schemes including Normal, Illinois, and Larchwood in Lyon County, Iowa; the McLean County town of Holder is named in his honor.

Fell's association with the railroad goes back to the time when it was surveyed. On at least two occasions he was able to alter the path of the railroad to suit his own interests: organizing a bend in the road so it would pass through his town of Normal and making a slight change in the survey so it would pass through the Livingston County town of Pontiac, where he had interests, rather than the rival town of Richmond. Shortly after Towanda was laid out, most of the land was back in the hands of the railroad's land agent, English-born Charles Roadnight (1814-?). Roadnight built the first warehouse in Towanda; he settled in Bloomington, had a farm in Dwight, and in 1858 later became treasurer of what was then the Chicago and Alton Railroad.

=== Original design ===
Central Illinois towns of the 1830s, such as Bloomington, Lexington, Leroy and Pontiac, were usually built around a central square. In contrast, most towns of the 1850s, like Towanda, were oriented toward the railroad tracks. In the case of Towanda a diagonal main street was established parallel to the railroad, with the main building lots on only one side; the effect was to have the commercial establishments look across the street toward the tracks. This was a common design in newly established towns along the Chicago and Alton Railroad and may be found, with slight variations, in places like Dwight, Gardner, Odell and McLean; Fell's town of Normal, established at the same time as Towanda, was to have had exactly the same arrangement; except that in Normal, the original street paralleling the railroad quickly lost its importance to the reverse side of the block. This standard town plan often left town designers with odd triangular pieces of land, where the diagonal street met with other streets which were aligned north–south or east–west. These triangles are often still in public hands. In the case of Towanda, Fell gave each of two triangular areas, one on either side of the tracks, to the town. On the original deed they were given the name "plaza", and both have always served the city as parks.

=== Development ===
Alex Warren built the first residence in the new town and James Alexander the first warehouse. These were soon followed by Wesley Bishop's grocery and Frank Henderson's dry goods store. The largest building was a two-story structure built by Charles Roadnight, which was 50 by 100 feet (15 by 30 m); the first floor was used for stores and the second as a meeting room. It burned about 1900. In 1873–1874, wooden sidewalks were being built, followed by brick sidewalks in 1891 and concrete walkways in 1916. The town was officially incorporated in 1870. The first jail was built in the North Park and replaced at least once; the structure can not have been very substantial because in 1901 the town fathers were forced to appoint a committee to inquire into what had happened to the jail. Perhaps the most exciting event in the town's history was the attack on the Buena Vista Tavern. A group of local women took exception to the amount of money their menfolk were spending on whiskey. They assembled at the hardware store where they were issued hatchets. They then marched into the Buena Vista smashing bottles, threatening the barman, and hurling whatever they could find through the tavern windows. Each of the women was fined one dollar.

=== Early views ===
A series of photographs taken in the 1870s give a striking view of early Towanda town. They show a town crisscrossed with fences and looking rather like the set for a western movie. Cattle and hogs were driven into town at night and penned before shipping on the railroad. Houses are carefully fenced to protect gardens from stray livestock. The majority of the homes are wooden I-cottages: single story, or story-and-a-half, wood frame dwellings with a symmetrical façade. There are some modest two-story structures. Along the railroad, long rail corn crib may be seen. The simple board-and-batten railroad station is clearly visible. Perhaps the most striking structure is a stone tank house topped with a windmill.

=== Twentieth century ===
Towanda has been plagued with fires. In 1905, a large part of the downtown area burned, and in 1917 the original railroad station went up in flames. However, there was also progress. In 1901, telephone service began, and in 1937 Main Street was paved. Still, Towanda remained in the shadow of its larger neighbors to the south, Normal and Bloomington, and was always smaller than Lexington, the next town north on the stagecoach road and the Chicago and Alton Railroad line, which generally paralleled each other between Chicago and Springfield.

Trains were essential to the development of the town, but traffic was never heavy; in 1887, only one southbound and one northbound freight stopped at Towanda. Passenger service stopped altogether in the 1940s. Most travel had long since been replaced by automobile and truck traffic along the roads that paralleled the Chicago and Alton rail line: State Bond Route 4 during the 1910s, U.S. Route 66 from 1926 through the early 1970s, and Interstate 55 from the 1970s onward. In 1955, U.S. Route 66 was locally widened to four lanes, as a partially divided highway with a grass median between the northbound and southbound lanes along much of its stretch. The former southbound lanes of Route 66 are now long disused, whereas the northbound roadbed is still in use as a two-lane local highway and the current path of Historic U.S. Route 66 in Illinois, now known as the Illinois Route 66 Scenic Byway, a designated National Scenic Byway.

When in 1977 the construction of Interstate 55 detoured U.S. Route 66 in a gradual curve around the northwest side of Towanda, a 3 1/4-mile section of southbound Route 66 was closed off to motorized traffic and abandoned. Between 1998 and 2000, a not-for-profit student and community project created the Towanda Historic Route 66 Parkway, also known as the Historic Route 66 Trail (as seen on Google Maps), on a 2.5-mile (4.0 km) stretch of the old disused Route 66 roadway between the south end of Towanda and a point about 3 miles (5 km) northeast, where Interstate 55 swings east to meet up with and once again closely parallel Historic Route 66. The parkway, an ongoing project that preserved the Money Creek Bridge north of town on Route 66 and begins about 750 feet (230 m) northeast of the bridge, also includes an outdoor educational exhibit on the history of Route 66 called "Historic Route 66: A Geographic Journey" that details the path of Route 66 through all eight states. This exhibit extends from the intersection of Historic Route 66 and Jefferson Street near the I-55 interchange to a point at the southern tip of town just past an unnamed pond off Historic Route 66 (at 40.557656, -88.908876), where there is a rest stop and parking area for catfish and bass fishing in the pond. The stretch of the parkway where the exhibit was erected is a subset of the overall Towanda Trail, which includes a three-flagpole garden on the northeast corner of Jefferson Street and Route 66, several picnic areas along the length of the trail, scattered birdhouses, and intermittent landscaped areas extending from the Money Creek Bridge to the south end of the pond. The trail and parkway exhibit, now a popular local tourist stop on Historic Route 66, continue to be improved on an irregular basis, and the progress of improvements is detailed on the project website.

=== Twenty-first century ===
In 2006, the Towanda Area Historical Society partnered with the Towanda District Library to obtain a digital imaging grant from the Illinois State Library for a project entitled "Capturing Towanda's Past for Eternity." An exceptional collection of scanned documents and images were added to the project's website as a result.

== Geography ==
Towanda is in central McLean County, 6 miles (10 km) northeast of Normal and 8 miles (13 km) northeast of Bloomington, the McLean county seat. Interstate 55 crosses the northwest corner of the village, with access from Exit 171. I-55 leads northeast 124 miles (200 km) to Chicago and southwest past Normal and Bloomington 75 miles (121 km) to Springfield.

According to the U.S. Census Bureau, Towanda has a total area of 0.74 square miles (1.92 km^{2}), all land. A tributary of Money Creek flows to the northeast through the village. Money Creek is a northwest-flowing tributary of the Mackinaw River, part of the Illinois River watershed.

=== Climate ===
The village gets 37 inches (940 mm) of rain per year. The U.S. average is 37. Snowfall is 24 inches (610 mm). The average U.S. city gets 25 inches (640 mm) of snow per year. The number of days with any measurable precipitation in the village is 104.

On average, there are 190 sunny days per year in Towanda. The July high is around 87 degrees. The January low is 16. Towanda-area historical tornado activity is slightly above Illinois state average. It is 114% greater than the overall U.S. average.

On May 5, 1977, there was an F4 (max. wind speeds 207-260 mph) tornado 22.2 miles (35.7 km) away from the Towanda village center that injured 2 people and caused between $500,000 and $5,000,000 in damages.

On July 7, 2004, there was an F4 tornado 23.9 miles (38.5 km) away from the village center that injured 3 people.

== Demographics ==
Historical population
Census	Pop.	Note	%±
1880	261		—
1890	402		54.0%
1900	467		16.2%
1910	404		−13.5%
1920	404		0.0%
1930	453		12.1%
1940	430		−5.1%
1950	400		−7.0%
1960	586		46.5%
1970	578		−1.4%
1980	630		9.0%
1990	856		35.9%
2000	493		−42.4%
2010	480		−2.6%
2020	431		−10.2%
Decennial US Census

As of the census of 2000, there were 493 people, 199 households, and 146 families residing in the village. The population density was 709.0 inhabitants per square mile (273.7/km^{2}). There were 207 housing units at an average density of 114.2 inhabitants/km^{2} (297.7 inhabitants/mi^{2}). The racial makeup of the village was 98.58% White, 0.41% African American, 0.41% from other races, and 0.61% from two or more races. Also, 0.41% of the population were Hispanic or Latino of any race.

There were 199 households, out of which 29.1% had children under the age of 18 living with them, 62.3% were married couples living together, 8.5% had a woman whose husband did not live with her, and 26.6% were non-families. 22.6% of all households were made up of individuals, and 7.0% had someone living alone who was 65 years of age or older. The average household size was 2.48 and the average family size was 2.91.

In the village, the age distribution of the population showed 24.1% under the age of 18, 5.7% from 18 to 24, 33.7% from 25 to 44, 23.7% from 45 to 64, and 12.8% who were 65 years of age or older. The median age was 37 years. For every 100 females, there were 94.9 males. For every 100 females age 18 and over, there were 95.8 males.

The median income for a household in the village was $41,705, and the median income for a family was $51,875. Males had a median income of $33,750 versus $30,078 for females. The per capita income for the village was $18,702, and 5.3% of the population and only 2.6% of families had an annual income below the federal poverty line. Of the total number of people living in poverty, 8.1% were under the age of 18, and 3.4% were age 65 or older.

== Civics ==
Towanda has a grain silo complex, local library, and Towanda Elementary School of McLean County Unit District Number 5.

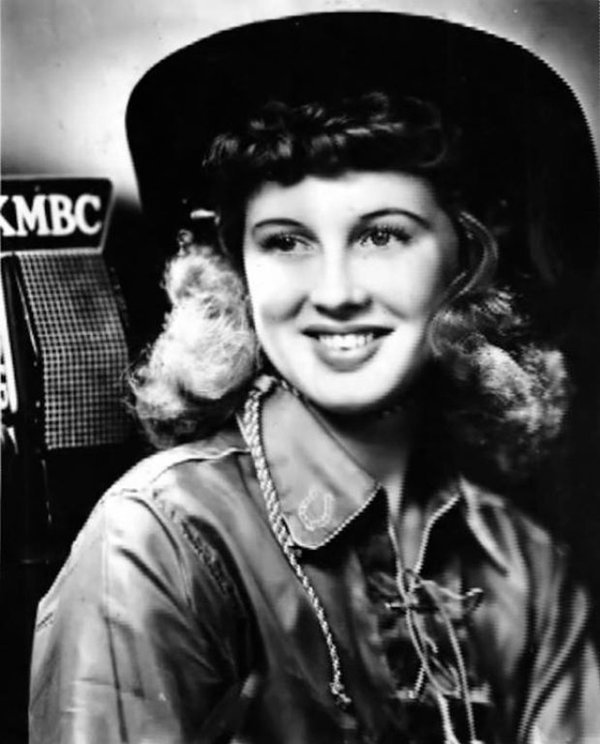
Bonnie Lou, singer, musician, and television personality born in Towanda, Illinois

Each July 3, Towanda has a spaghetti supper in the evening and a street dance at night. People from Towanda and surrounding areas come out for the festivities.

On July 4, a parade goes through Towanda and is considered a big event in McLean County. Individuals and families from around Bloomington, Normal, Hudson, Lexington and elsewhere come out for it. Additionally, there is a flea market and the two parks where vendors come from all around the United States to sell their antiques and other items.

== Notable people ==
The most famous person from Towanda was singer-musician-TV personality Bonnie Lou (born Mary Joan Kath), who gained international popularity in the 1950s with rock and roll and country hits. She became a popular TV host and performer in Cincinnati until her retirement in the 1970s.

Wilbur Cash (1887–1956), farmer, businessman, and politician, lived in Towanda.
