= Towanda Township, McLean County, Illinois =

Coordinates: 40°32′05″N 88°51′50″W

Towanda Township
- Township
- Location in McLean County

- McLean County's location in Illinois
- Country: United States
- State: Illinois
- County: McLean
- Established: November 3, 1857

Area
  - Total: 35.1 sq mi (91 km^{2})
  - Land: 35.1 sq mi (91 km^{2})
  - Water: 0 sq mi (0 km^{2}) 0%

Population (2020)
  - Total: 2,006
  - Density: 36.9/sq mi (14.2/km^{2})
- Time zone: UTC-6 (CST)
  - Summer (DST): UTC-5 (CDT)
- FIPS code: 17-113-75835

Towanda Township is located in McLean County, Illinois. As of the 2020 census, its population was 2,006 and it contained 555 housing units. It contains the entirety of the town of Towanda and a portion of the town of Normal.

== Geography ==
According to the 2010 census, the township has a total area of 35.1 square miles (91 km^{2}), all land.

== Demographics ==
As of the 2020 Census, Towanda Township's population was 2,006.

Historical population
Census	Pop.	Note	%±
2016 (est.)	1,226
U.S. Decennial Census
