= The Pantagraph =

Newspaper of Bloomington–Normal, Illinois, US

Coordinates: 40°28′48″N 88°59′36″W

- Type: Daily newspaper
- Format: Broadsheet
- Owner: Lee Enterprises
- Founder: Jesse W. Fell
- Editor: Allison Petty
- Photo editor: Clay Jackson
- Founded: January 14, 1837; 189 years ago
- Headquarters: 205 North Main Street; Bloomington, Illinois 61701
- Country: United States
- Circulation: 16,930 Daily; 17,870 Sunday (as of 2023)
- Sister newspapers: Herald & Review
- ISSN: 2641-7634
- OCLC number: 16418931
- Website: pantagraph.com

The Pantagraph is a daily newspaper that serves Bloomington–Normal, Illinois, along with 60 communities and eight counties in the Central Illinois area. Its headquarters are in Bloomington and it is owned by Lee Enterprises. The name is derived from the Greek words "panta" and "grapho," which has a combined meaning of "write all things."

== History ==
Bloomington businessman Jesse W. Fell founded the newspaper on January 14, 1837, making it among the oldest still-operating businesses in McLean County, though the business lapsed between 1839 and 1845. W. O. Davis and his heirs owned the Pantagraph for many years until selling the paper to Chronicle Publishing Company in 1980. The paper was purchased by Pulitzer from Chronicle Publishing Company in 1999; Lee Enterprises bought Pulitzer in 2005.

The paper was originally called The Bloomington Observer and McLean County Advocate. Through the years, the newspaper went through several name changes, such as The Whig, The Intelligencer, The Daily Pantagraph, The Pantagraph in 1985, just Pantagraph in 2006, changing back to The Pantagraph in 2008.

From 1935 to 2018, the newspaper operated from a 65,000-square-foot (6,000 m^{2}) building at 301 W. Washington St. Then-publisher Julie Bechtel announced in November 2017 that the business would move two blocks east to a new home at 205 N. Main St., just across from the McLean County Museum of History in the heart of downtown Bloomington.

== Operations ==
The Pantagraph was a news partner of WEEK-TV, which is situated in East Peoria, Illinois.

Its sister publications include The Woodford County Journal in Eureka, the Herald & Review in Decatur, and the Journal Gazette & Times-Courier in Mattoon.
