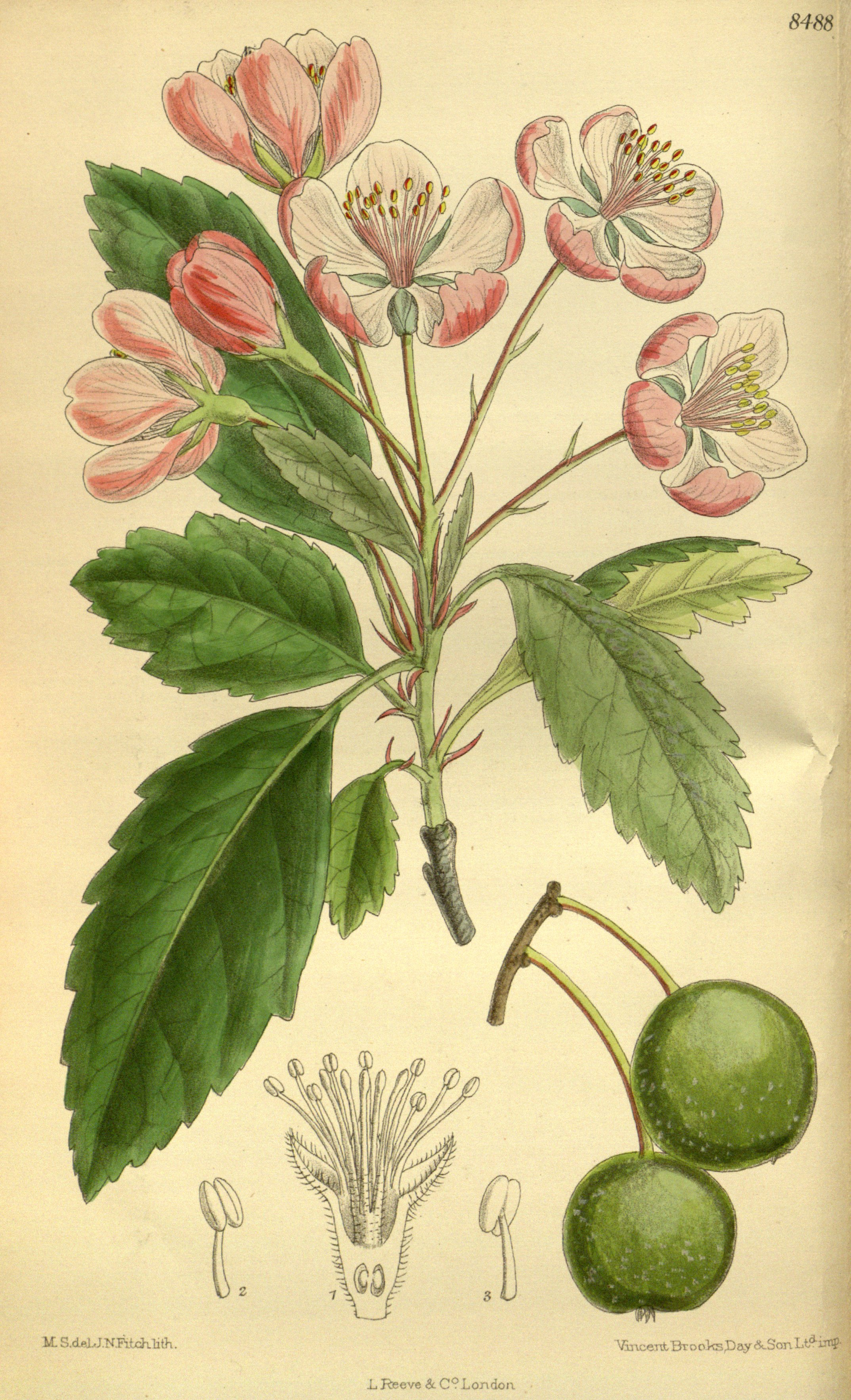
- 1913 lithograph by J.N.Fitch

Scientific classification
- Kingdom: Plantae
- Clade: Tracheophytes
- Clade: Angiosperms
- Clade: Eudicots
- Clade: Rosids
- Order: Rosales
- Family: Rosaceae
- Genus: Malus
- Species: M. ioensis

Binomial name
- Malus ioensis (Alph.Wood) Britton 1897
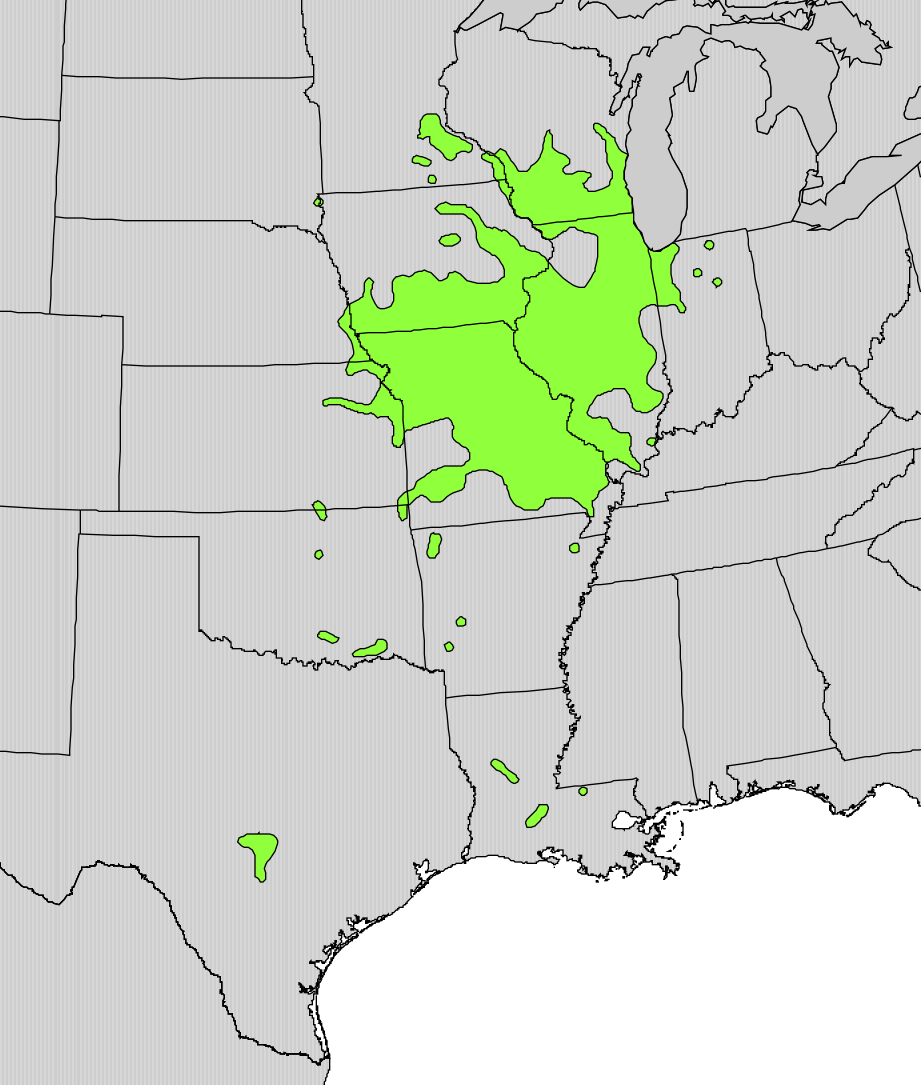
- Natural range

Synonyms
- Pyrus coronaria var. ioensis Alph. Wood 1861; Malus coronaria subsp. ioensis (Alph. Wood) Likhonos; Malus coronaria var. ioensis (Alph. Wood) C.K. Schneid.; Pyrus ioensis (Alph. Wood) L.H. Bailey

= Malus ioensis =

Species of apple tree

Malus ioensis, known as the Iowa crab or prairie crabapple, is a species of crabapple tree native to the United States. The most common variety, M. ioensis var. ioensis, is found primarily in the prairie regions of the upper Mississippi Valley. Another variety, M. ioensis var. texana, or the Texas crabapple, is found only in a small region of central Texas.

The Iowa crab can grow up to 10 meters (35 feet) in height. It bears white or pink flowers in the summer and small apple-like berries in the fall.

Various wildlife consume the fruit.
