= McLean County Museum of History =

Coordinates: 40°28′47″N 88°59′37″W

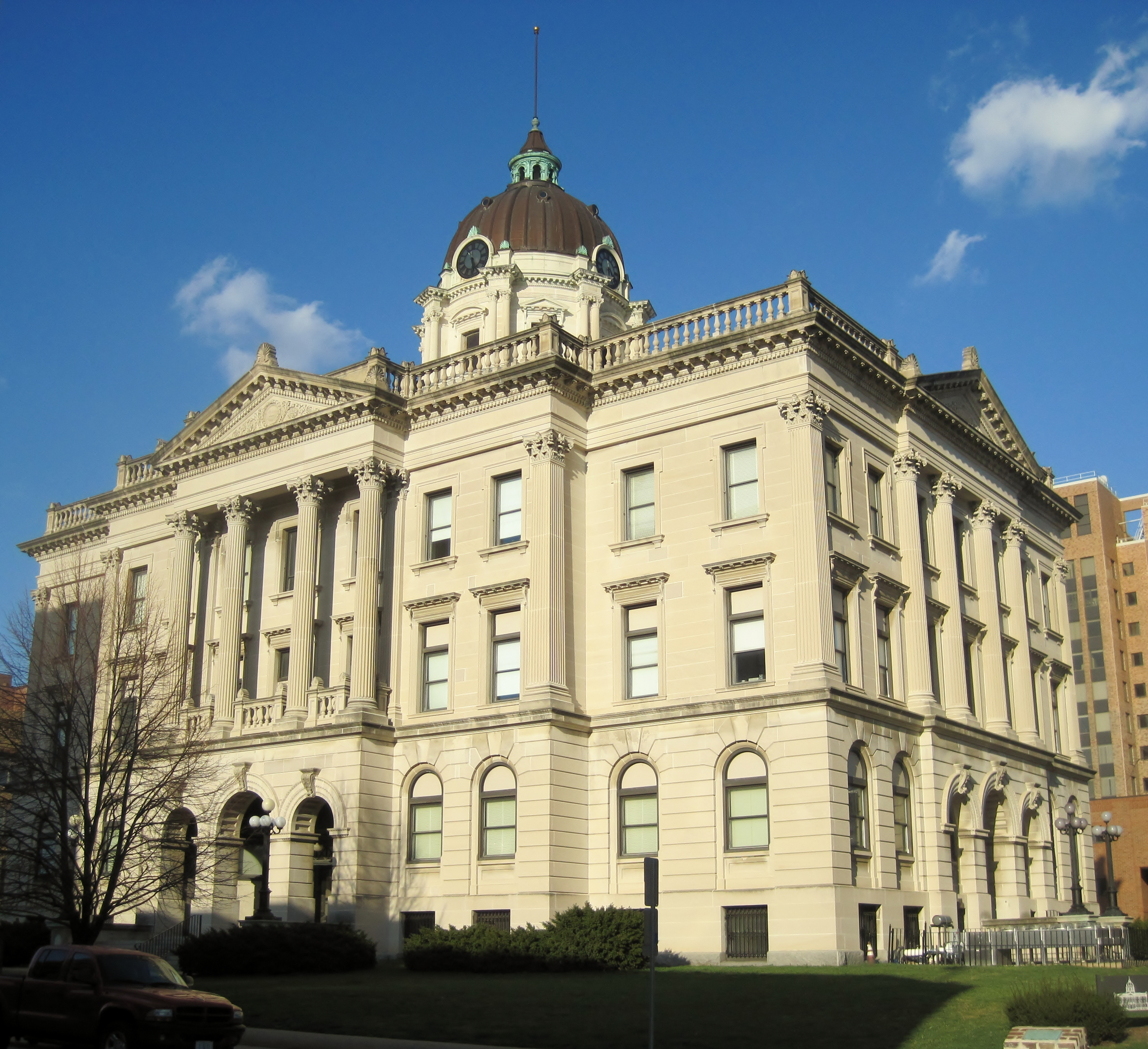
- The Main Street façade
- Established: 1892
- Location: 200 N. Main St. Bloomington, Illinois 61701
- Type: History Museum
- Public transit access: Connect Transit
- Website: http://mchistory.org

The McLean County Museum of History is an AAM accredited institution located in Bloomington, Illinois. It is the principal asset of the McLean County Historical Society, an Illinois nonprofit organization, which was founded in 1892 to study local history. The Museum moved into its current location in 1991.

== History ==
The initial purpose of the McLean County Historical Society was to meet and present papers on local history topics. Soon, people in the community began donating historical objects to the society. In 1904, the society opened its first Museum and hired a curator. Reinvigorated by a change in leadership and New Deal dollars in the 1930s, the entire collection was re-inventoried and re-cataloged. Additionally, indexes to archival and local periodical collections were developed.

A fire in the Museum structure in 1972 forced the society to reevaluate itself, though the fire did not damage the collections. Consequently, a newly organized board made the decision to operate the Museum on a professional basis. In 1979, a long-range plan was developed to achieve AAM accreditation, which was realized in 1984. The Museum was reaccredited in 1996, 2008, and 2022. In 1989-1991 McLean County Courthouse was renovated and converted to a Museum.

=== Building ===
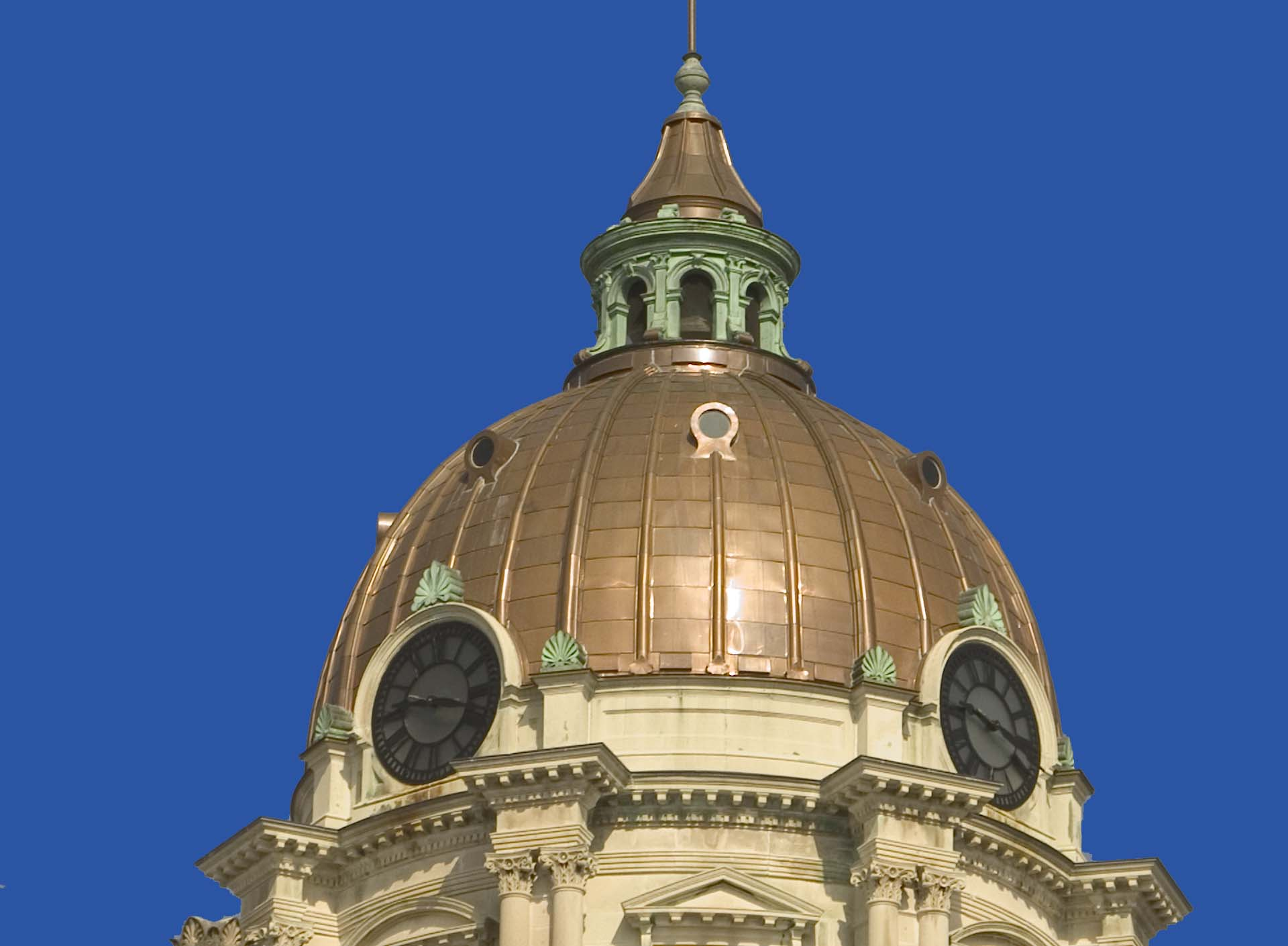
The dome of the Museum after its restoration in 2005

The Museum square is the site of three previous courthouses. The first county courthouse was built in 1831 out of whipsawn cherry and black walnut. In expectation of an economic boom, a new two-story Federal-style courthouse was constructed in 1836. This courthouse served Abraham Lincoln and other attorneys of the Eighth Judicial Circuit. It also was used by religious groups and it housed the county's first newspaper. Alfred Piquenard designed the third courthouse in 1868 in the Italian Renaissance style. On June 19, 1900, a fire in downtown Bloomington destroyed four and a half square blocks and caused major damage to the structure. The Peoria, IL firm Reeves and Baile were commissioned to design and rebuild the courthouse. Reeves designed the new courthouse in the American Renaissance style, which was completed in 1903. The building served as the county courthouse until 1976 when the courts moved to an up-to-date facility. The courthouse continued to be used for administrative purposes until 1988, and then was converted into a Museum.

In 2002, the dome and its base were restored. The original copper decorative elements were salvaged and reused, and the limestone drum stone was repaired. The c. 1957 clock mechanism was replaced, and in 2004 the bell from the 1868 courthouse rung for the first time in nearly half a century. In 2005, Landmarks Illinois presented the Outstanding Restoration award to McLean County for their efforts to restore the dome.

== Exhibits ==
The Museum's collection consists of materials that document the growth and development of McLean County from the prehistoric period through the present. The materials in the collection represent McLean County's diverse cultural history, people's relationship to their physical environment, political and economic activity, the history of institutions and organizations, civic culture, and iconography. Exhibitions draw primarily from the Museum's own collections, which numbers approximately 18,000 objects.

The Museum's permanent exhibit, Challenges, Choices, and Change, explores the lives of the people who settled McLean County. The exhibit is housed in four galleries:

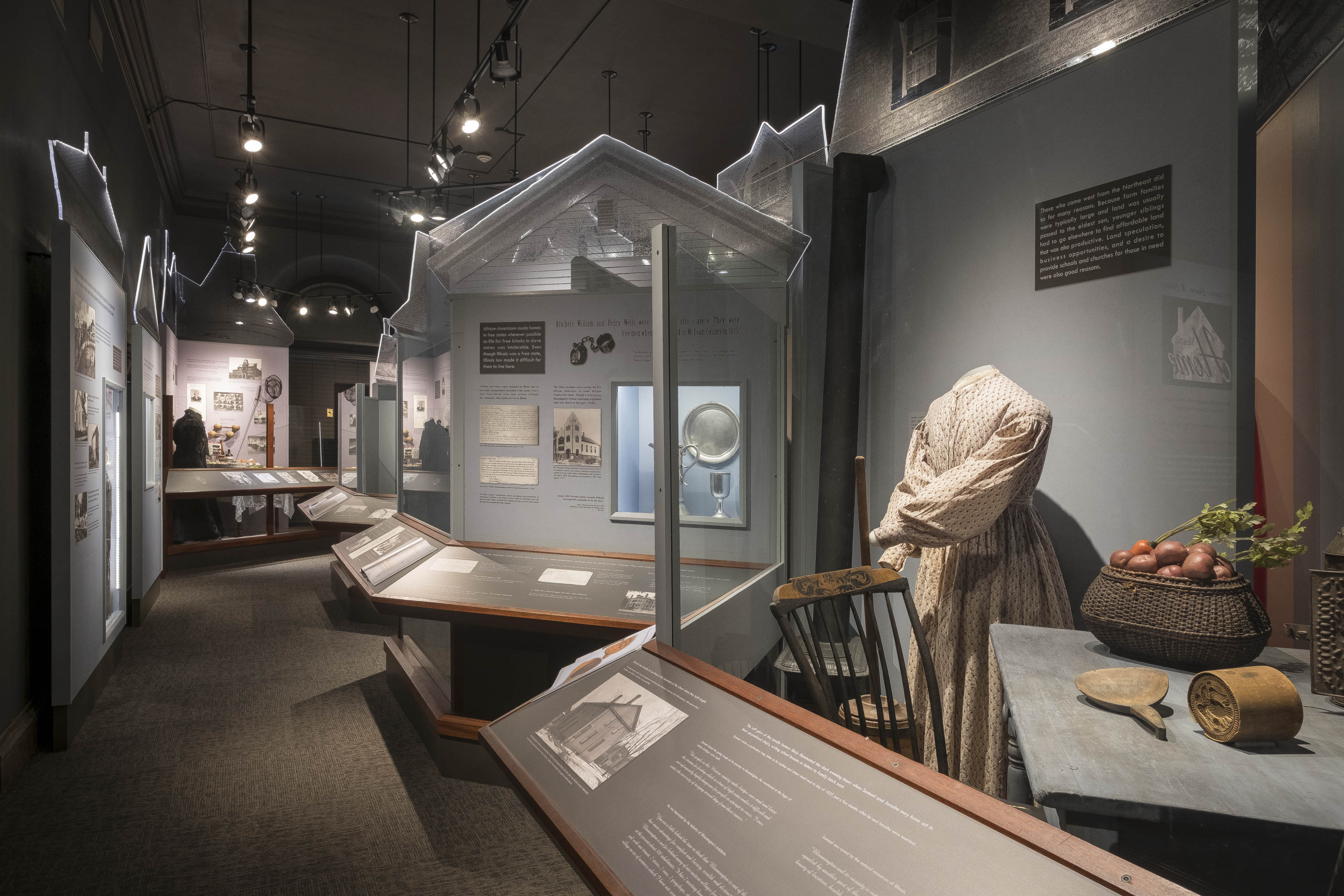
"Challenges Choices and Change: Making a Home", an exhibit

Making a Home
"From the arrival of Native people to the immigration of Asian Indians and Latinos in the late 20th century, the exhibit explores the experiences of individuals and families who came from all over the world to make McLean County their home."
A Community in Conflict
"This new permanent exhibit asks the question "Who had the power?" — the power to define morality, to gain respect, to instill fear, and more."
Working for a Living
"From the arrival of the first settlers in the 1820s to the fast paced technology driven 1990s, see how jobs have transformed and the challenges and choices workers faced changed as a new technologies developed. Join us as we explore the experience of people at work."
Farming in the Great Corn Belt
"From the first settlers in the 1820s to the modern farmer of the late 20th century, this new permanent exhibit tells the story of McLean County farmers — the tools and techniques they used, the crops and livestock they raised, and the difficult choices they made in order to be productive and profitable producers."

Abraham Lincoln in McLean County is another permanent exhibit that examines Lincoln's work as an attorney in McLean County and on the Illinois Eighth Judicial Circuit. It defines his pivotal role in the anti-slavery movement and the formation of the new Republican Party in Illinois. It makes clear the circumstances of his nomination for president in 1860, and explores the lasting connections Lincoln made with the people of this community.

The Museum also houses three temporary exhibit spaces: The Dolan & Behr Gallery, the Helen Alexander Bender Gallery and the Merwin Gallery. Exhibits are mounted by Museum staff and guest curators with objects and images from the Museum's collection. These galleries feature short term (2-3 year) exhibits that explore local history themes. Past award-winning exhibits include Just Corn: The "Amazing" Story; A Turbulent Time: Perspectives of the Vietnam War; and To Sustain the Union: Central Illinois in the Civil War.

The Museum displays the Tilbury Flash, a racing plane designed by Bloomington resident Owen Tilbury in 1932, at the Central Illinois Regional Airport. It was the smallest plane in the world when it was built, and won many aircraft racing competitions.

In 2015 the Museum opened the Cruisin' With Lincoln on 66 Visitors Center and gift shop on the lower level of the Museum.

== Research and education ==
A goal of the McLean County Museum of History is to support research in local and family history by operating a publicly accessible library and archive. The Stevenson-Ives Library and Benjamin Hoopes Family Archives contain a wide range of primary and secondary source material relating to Central Illinois history from the early 1800s to present. Types of materials housed in the archives include correspondence, diaries, business and farm ledgers, newspapers, maps, photographs, manuscripts, and oral histories.

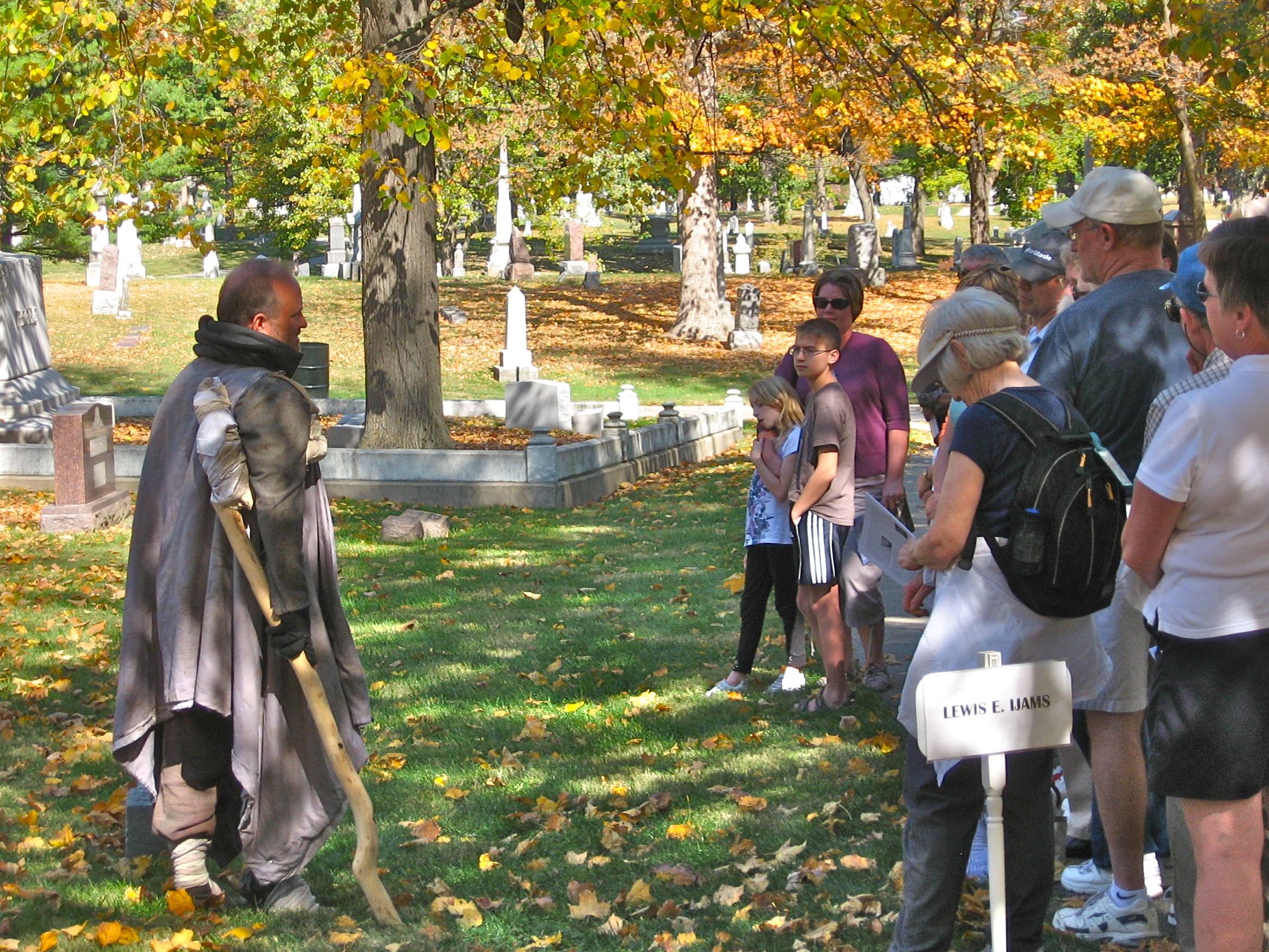
An actor portrays Lewis Ijams during the Evergreen Cemetery Walk in 2011.

Topics include works on material and popular culture, military history, biographies, religious groups, agriculture, school directories and annuals, and works by local authors. Many of the larger collections in the archives have finding aids, and about 90 of those have been placed on the Museum’s website. A significant part of the library collection relates to the study of genealogy and is provided by the McLean County Genealogical Society and the Letitia Green Stevenson Chapter of the National Society of Daughters of the American Revolution.

The Museum provides educational opportunities through hands-on, object based, and interactive learning geared towards all ages. Educational programs contextualize local history within state and national history and promote active, integrative learning using sensory experiences. All programs meet Illinois State Board of Education learning goals and are taught by the Museum’s Director of Education and Education Program Coordinator. The Museum also loans kits (a Museum-in-a-box) to classrooms which provide object-based learning on various topics for students through artifacts, reproductions, and activities. Senior reminiscence programs use objects to elicit memories and stimulate cognition and communication. Additionally, the Museum offers tours, field trips, presentations, and a History Careers Day Camp.

The Museum also features the Harriet Fuller Rust Discovery Room. This space recreates what life was like without modern technology. Children can experience life in the early 19th century by pushing a steel plow, carrying water, gardening, milking a cow, trying on period clothes, and other activities.

Since 1995, the Museum has hosted the Evergreen Cemetery Walk. Each year, local professional actors portray a variety of individuals who lived in McLean County, bringing their diverse stories to life. In addition to actor representations, the tour includes information about cemetery art and architecture, history of Evergreen Memorial Cemetery, and the history of burial and funerary practices.

== Awards ==
- Accredited by the American Alliance of Museums
- American Association of State and Local History
  - Award of Merit: 1993, 1997, 1999
  - Certificate of Commendation: 2001, 2002, 2004
  - Leadership in History Award: 2020, 2024
- Illinois Association of Museums
  - Award of Excellence: 1996
  - Best Practices in Virtual Materials: 2018
  - Best Practices in Educational Programming: 2018
- Association of Midwest Museums:
  - Best Practices Award: 2022
  - Museum Media Film Festival Award: 2019
  - Superior Achievement in Community Partnerships: 2018, 2022
- Landmarks Preservation Council of Illinois Outstanding Restoration Award 2005
