= Gridley Township, McLean County, Illinois =

Coordinates: 40°43′02″N 88°54′35″W

Gridley Township
- Township
- Location in McLean County

- McLean County's location in Illinois
- Country: United States
- State: Illinois
- County: McLean
- Established: November 3, 1857

Area
  - Total: 54.5 sq mi (141 km^{2})
  - Land: 54.48 sq mi (141.1 km^{2})
  - Water: 0.01 sq mi (0.026 km^{2}) 0.02%

Population (2010)
  - Estimate (2016): 1,905
  - Density: 35.1/sq mi (13.6/km^{2})
- Time zone: UTC-6 (CST)
  - Summer (DST): UTC-5 (CDT)
- FIPS code: 17-113-31745

Gridley Township is located in McLean County, Illinois. As of the 2010 census, its population was 1,913 and it contained 790 housing units.

== History ==
Gridley Township was named for Asahel Gridley, an Illinois state senator.

== Geography ==
According to the 2010 census, the township has a total area of 54.5 square miles (141 km^{2}), of which 54.48 square miles (141.1 km^{2}) (or 99.96%) is land and 0.01 square miles (0.026 km^{2}) (or 0.02%) is water.

== Demographics ==
Historical population
Census	Pop.	Note	%±
2016 (est.)	1,905
U.S. Decennial Census
