= Lynn C. Sieberns =

American politician

Lynn Callsen Sieberns (February 8, 1889 ― February 23, 1962) was an American politician who served in the Illinois Senate as a member of the Democratic Party.

Sieberns was born February 8, 1889. Sieberns earned a bachelor of law in 1912. Sieberns served in World War I as a medic, serving overseas for thirteen months and taking part in many important battles. He married Edna Meyer of Oak Park, Illinois.

Sieberns was elected to the Illinois Senate in 1932 after defeating Republican incumbent Florence Fifer Bohrer as part of a national Democratic wave. In the 1940 general election, Republican candidate Wilbur J. Cash defeated Sieberns. On February 23, 1962, Sieberns died of a heart attack while attending an Illinois Commerce Commission hearing.
