= Jesse W. Fell =

American businessman and land owner

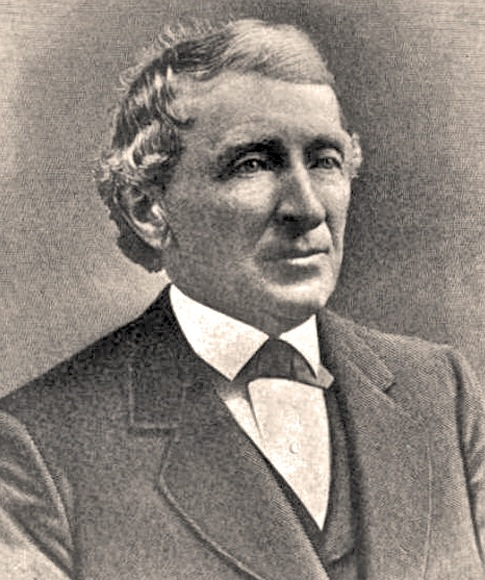

Personal details
- Born: November 10, 1808 Chester County, Pennsylvania, US
- Died: February 25, 1887 (aged 78) Normal, Illinois, US
- Spouse: Hester Vernon Brown

Jesse W. Fell (November 10, 1808 – February 25, 1887) was an American businessman and landowner. He was instrumental in the founding of Illinois State University as well as Normal, Pontiac, Clinton, Towanda, Dwight, DeWitt County and Livingston County in Central Illinois. He was also the founder of the newspaper The Pantagraph. As a close friend of Abraham Lincoln, it was Fell who urged him to challenge his opponent, Stephen A. Douglas, to their famous series of debates.

== Life and work ==
Fell was born in rural southeastern Chester County, Pennsylvania, to Quaker parents of modest means, Rebecca (Roman) and Jesse Fell. He attended local Friends schools as well as a private boy's academy and briefly taught in local public schools before migrating to Ohio to study law in 1828.

In 1831 Fell moved to Illinois, opening Bloomington's first law offices and beginning his career in real estate. Fell was especially active during the Illinois land boom in the late 1830s; with James Allin, Fell co-founded the town of Clinton, Illinois, and worked to create DeWitt County arranging for his brother, Kersey H. Fell, to become the clerk responsible for organizing the new county. He established Livingston County, which he named, and backed the founders of Pontiac, Illinois, which he also named. Fell invested in lands in Bloomington, Chicago, Milwaukee, Danville, and other places in central and eastern Illinois.

Fell also founded Bloomington's first newspaper, The Bloomington Observer and McLean County Advocate in 1837 and, after several years running a fruit orchard in Adams County, returned to McLean County and worked as an agent for the former Alton & Springfield Railroad to secure the right of way through McLean County. He helped found the town of Towanda and with his brother founded the town of Dwight. and later defeated an effort to have the railroad bypass his extensive land holdings in Pontiac. He sold lots in Decatur, Lexington, Clinton, El Paso, Joliet, and LeRoy and in 1855 he purchased timber land and began operation a sawmill near Ullin in southern Illinois.

In 1854 Fell arranged for the Chicago and Mississippi Railroad to cross the Illinois Central Railroad north of Bloomington where he had founded the town of North Bloomington. In 1860, Illinois State Normal University relocated there from a site in downtown Bloomington, resulting in the town being renamed Normal in 1865. Fell was an enthusiastic arborist who developed an extensive park around his home, and was known for planting trees in his real estate holdings.

== Death ==
Fell died at his home in Normal, Illinois, on February 25, 1887. The Normal Town Council declared that through his "untiring and disinterested efforts" he had secured the crossing of the two railroads and they passed a resolution stating that, "Normal without Jesse Fell is comparatively like a family without a father."

== Legacy ==
- Many place names in Normal reflect Jesse W. Fell. Fell Park in Normal is located on land he set aside for public use in the 1850s. There is also a Fell Avenue extending from Bloomington to Normal. Hester Street in Normal is named for his wife Hester Brown Fell. Fort Jesse Road in Normal takes its name from the nickname given by the Fell family to their isolated rural home during the early years in Illinois.
- Co-founded, along with James Allin, the city of Clinton, Illinois. With Charles W. Holder he co-founded the town of Towanda, Illinois. He was one of five men who founded Dwight, Illinois. He was deeply involved with the founding of Pontiac, Illinois and in the creation of Livingston County, Illinois. Fell Park in Pontiac is named in his honor.
- Illinois State University has an arboretum covering its main quadrangle known as the Fell Arboretum (in Jesse W. Fell's honor). The university also has a Fell Hall housing the Department of Communication named for Fell.
- Fell's granddaughter married Lewis Stevenson, making him an ancestor of the Illinois political family, including Democratic presidential candidate Adlai E. Stevenson II, his great-grandson and U.S. Senator Adlai E. Stevenson III, his great-great-grandson.
- Larchwood, in Lyon County, Iowa, was founded about 1872 by a group of McLean County, Illinois, land developers Jesse W. Fell (10 November 1808 – 25 February 1887) and Charles W. Holder (25 September 1819 – 10 April 1900).
- He helped organize the Free Congregational Church in Bloomington, a member of the [American Unitarian Association], now called the Unitarian Universalist Church of Bloomington-Normal.

He was nationally known for his love of trees. Holder was a partner in many of Fell's projects. In the summer of 1869 Fell traveled to northwestern Iowa and selected a tract of about forty sections, more than 25,000 acres (100 km^{2}) of land. Fell wrote: "I have never beheld such a large body of surpassingly beautiful prairie as is here to be found. There is absolutely no waste of land, and scarce a quarter of a section not affording an admirable building site." Holder then entered the land. Larchwood was established at the center of their holdings. Fell frequently visited the site and in May 1873 personally supervised the planting of some 100,000 saplings and tree cuttings. The town did not grow as rapidly as expected and in 1881 the development was sold to an Englishman Richard Sykes. There still is a small grove of larchwood trees growing in the Larchwood park. Larchwood has a Fell Street.
