= Benjaminville, Illinois =

Ghost town

The village of Benjaminville, Illinois, was founded in McLean County, Illinois, United States during the 1850s by Quaker farmers, who, like many others who came to Illinois, were looking to take advantage of the rich prairie soil. The town's settlement centered on the Society of Friends and the meeting house that was first constructed there in 1859. The town was rendered a ghost town after 1870 when the expected Lake Erie Railroad did not come into town. Today the unincorporated community of Bentown, Illinois, exists near the site of the former town of Benjaminville.

== History ==
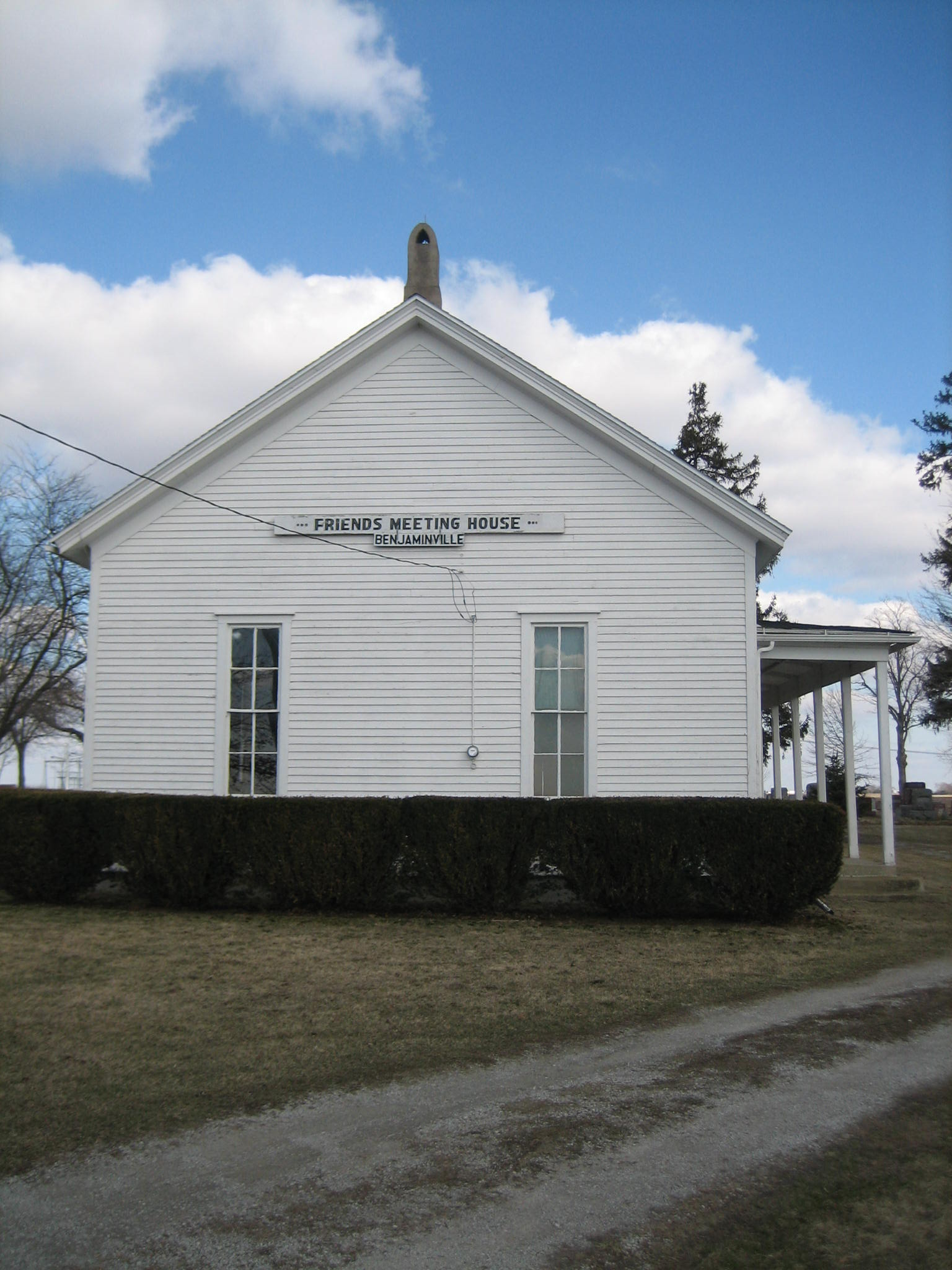
The Benjaminville Friends Meeting House is the only remaining building in the ghost town of Benjaminville

Benjaminville was founded in 1856 when three Quaker families, those of Joseph Marot, Isaac Clement and Timothy Benjamin, arrived in the area. Settlement followed and was closely tied to the Society of Friends and the local church. The town grew gradually, in 1859 the first Meeting House was erected at a cost of US$1,000 and a burial ground was established soon after. Through the 1860s a slow but steady stream of Quakers moved to the area. In 1874 the Benjaminville Friends Meeting House was erected, the only structure still extant from the town of Benjaminville. Settlement continued through the 1870s and Benjaminville became a social, political and religious hub for Friends from Illinois. An 1879 history of McLean County called Benjaminville "one of the strongest settlements of Friends that is to be found anywhere in the state."

The members of the Society of Friends Benjaminville meeting often took political stances on issues of the day. Among these were, peace, Indian affairs, women's suffrage, and the evils of boxing, lotteries and gambling. Throughout the 19th century Benjaminville was home to a distinct local community of considerable political importance. Benjaminville never grew large though it did contain at least two churches besides the meeting house and a few shops. By 1870 the town's fate was sealed when the Lake Erie Railroad opted to bypass the town because of the elevation of its terrain. The local churches eventually moved closer to the new railroad and the town's businesses shut down. In 1981 the only other remaining structure, an old wagon shop, was destroyed by fire, leaving the meeting house as the last remnant of the town.

== Geography ==
The last remaining structure in Benjaminville is located at 40°28′35.4″N 88°48′22″W. The village of Benjaminville was located near the present-day community of Holder, Illinois, east of the city of Bloomington. The town was founded on an elevated area of flat, treeless prairie. Today, much of the area is used as crop land. Near the site of Benjaminville is the present-day unincorporated community of Bentown, Illinois. The townsite lies in both Dawson Township and Oldtown Township.
