= Ellsworth, Illinois =

- Village
- Location in McLean County, Illinois
- Coordinates: 40°26′58″N 88°42′58″W
- Country: United States
- State: Illinois
- County: McLean
- Township: Dawson

Area
  - Total: 0.22 sq mi (0.56 km^{2})
  - Land: 0.22 sq mi (0.56 km^{2})
  - Water: 0 sq mi (0.00 km^{2})
- Elevation: 866 ft (264 m)

Population (2020)
  - Total: 184
  - Density: 848.8/sq mi (327.71/km^{2})
- Time zone: UTC-6 (CST)
  - Summer (DST): UTC-5 (CDT)
- ZIP Code: 61737
- Area code: 309
- FIPS code: 17-23555
- GNIS ID: 2398811
- Website: https://www.villageofellsworthil.com/

Ellsworth is a village in Dawson Township, McLean County, Illinois, United States. The population was 184 at the 2020 census. It is part of the Bloomington–Normal Metropolitan Statistical Area.

== History ==
=== Founding and original design ===
Ellsworth was laid out on December 6, 1871, by Jonathan H. Cheney (1833–1920), Almon Brigham Ives (1816–1887), and Oliver Ellsworth, whom the town was named after. Cheney was one of three sons of early McLean County settler Jonathan Cheney active in promoting the Lafayette Bloomington and Mississippi Railroad; when his brother, Haines Cheney, was in the Illinois Senate he had helped to arrange the charter of the railroad. Almon B. Ives was a Bloomington lawyer specializing in land law; both Cheney and Ives were on the board of directors of the new railroad. In 1876 the railroad was leased to the Lake Erie and Western Railroad and in 1879 was incorporated into that road. Construction began on the railroad in 1869. The new townsite occupied 40 acres (16 ha) on each side of the tracks. The plan of Ellsworth was almost identical to that of its neighbor, Arrowsmith. A 200-foot (61 m) swath of railroad land cut the town into two almost equal parts. Most of the early commercial development was along Main Street south of the tracks. The depot was on the south side of the tracks, and the early elevator on the north side.

=== Selling of Ellsworth at auction ===
In November 1871 an advertisement appeared in the Bloomington Pantagraph saying that on November 8 an auction of 150 lots would be held at the site of the new town. The advertisement praised the fertility of the surrounding countryside and stressed that the farms were of moderate size. Readers were told that the new town would be the logical point for shipping grain. They were also told that by shipping from Ellsworth their grain would go through Toledo, Ohio, "avoiding the grain scalpers of Chicago." All interested people were to gather at the Illinois Central Depot in Bloomington at 9:00 in the morning. A free train would take them to the site of the new town. A free lunch would be provided, and Bloomington brewers Meyer and Wochner would provide the beer. Some two hundred people consumed 200 loaves of bread, 150 pounds of boiled ham, 60 barrels of cheese and a barrel of crackers. A. J. Wampler bought the first lot. Most lots sold at from forty to sixty-five dollars.

=== Development of Ellsworth ===
Many local merchants were attracted to the new town. John Campbell moved his store from Stumptown about 4 miles (6 km) south of Ellsworth. Stumptown was soon totally abandoned. Edwards and Wampler moved their stock from a store in rural Blue Mound Township and were soon reported to be doing a thriving trade; Wampler became the first postmaster. Henry Vandervoort and Joseph Pierce opened a hardware store in 1873. August Flint had a wagon shop. The town founders donated "a good lot" for a church. In 1872 regular freight service began along the new railroad. Many new houses were built. Grain was soon being purchased and shipped. After a brief boom the population soon exceeded 200, but growth soon slowed.

== Geography ==
Ellsworth is in eastern McLean County, 16 miles (26 km) east of Bloomington, the county seat, and 9 miles (14 km) north-northeast of Le Roy.

According to the U.S. Census Bureau, Ellsworth has a total area of 0.22 square miles (0.57 km^{2}), all land.

== Demographics ==
Historical population
Census	Pop.	Note	%±
1880	168		—
1930	261		—
1940	255		−2.3%
1950	199		−22.0%
1960	224		12.6%
1970	259		15.6%
1980	244		−5.8%
1990	224		−8.2%
2000	271		21.0%
2010	195		−28.0%
2020	184		−5.6%
Decennial US Census

As of the 2000 United States Census, there were 271 people, 92 households and 72 families, residing in the village. The population density was 1,145.7 inhabitants per square mile (442.4/km^{2}). There were 95 housing units at an average density of 401.6 per square mile (155.1/km^{2}). The racial makeup of the village was 94.10% White, 0.37% African American, 2.95% Native American, 1.11% from other races, and 1.48% from two or more races. Hispanic or Latino of any race were 1.48% of the population.

There were 92 households, out of which 44.6% had children under the age of 18 living with them, 70.7% were married couples living together, 6.5% had a female householder with no husband present, and 21.7% were non-families. 19.6% of all households were made up of individuals, and 6.5% had someone living alone, who was 65 years of age or older. The average household size was 2.95 and the average family size was 3.43.

In the village, the population was spread out, with 31.7% under the age of 18, 9.2% from 18 to 24, 28.4% from 25 to 44, 21.0% from 45 to 64, and 9.6% who were 65 years of age or older. The median age was 33 years. For every 100 females, there were 93.6 males. For every 100 females age 18 and over, there were 88.8 males.

The median income for a household in the village was $45,714 and the median income for a family was $53,333. Males had a median income of $32,237 versus $24,688 for females. The per capita income for the village was $18,439. None of the families and 1.5% of the population were living below the poverty line.

== See also ==
- List of towns and villages in Illinois
