= Arrowsmith, Illinois =

- Village
- Location in McLean County, Illinois
- Coordinates: 40°26′57″N 88°37′56″W
- Country: United States
- State: Illinois
- County: McLean
- Township: Arrowsmith

Area
  - Total: 0.20 sq mi (0.51 km^{2})
  - Land: 0.20 sq mi (0.51 km^{2})
  - Water: 0 sq mi (0.00 km^{2})
- Elevation: 883 ft (269 m)

Population (2020)
  - Total: 276
  - Density: 1,398.0/sq mi (539.79/km^{2})
- Time zone: UTC-6 (CST)
  - Summer (DST): UTC-5 (CDT)
- ZIP code: 61722
- Area code: 309
- FIPS code: 17-02342
- GNIS ID: 2397992
- Website: arrowsmithil.gov

Arrowsmith is a village in McLean County, Illinois, United States. The population was 276 at the 2020 census. It is part of the Bloomington–Normal Metropolitan Statistical Area.

== History ==
=== Founding of Arrowsmith ===
Arrowsmith was laid out on December 7, 1871, by Charles W. Holder (1808–1887) and Owen T. Reeves (1829- ?). The founders kept their identities hidden for two years until the plat was officially recorded. Both proprietors lived in Bloomington, were experienced land dealers, and were involved in the creation of the Lafayette Bloomington and Muncie Railroad. Holder had been Jesse Fell's partner in the founding of Towanda, Illinois, was one of his partners in the development of Normal, Illinois, and the town of Holder, Illinois, would soon be named in his honor. Reeves was a Bloomington lawyer and judge who had been colonel of the short-lived 70th Illinois Infantry during the Civil War. Arrowsmith Township had voted $30,000 in bonds to support the construction of the railroad on the condition that a station be established in their township. It was at first thought that the name of the town would be Weldon, but it was soon learned that this name had been taken by a newly founded town in DeWitt County. Arrowsmith takes its name from the township in which it was located, which had been named for early settler Ezekiel Arrowsmith. Several of the first buildings in Arrowsmith were moved to the new town from Senex, located about three miles to the southwest near the edge of Old Town Timber. Taking advantage of cold weather, John Thompson had used 32 horses to skid his store from Senex to Arrowsmith in just over two hours. The Senex blacksmith shop and the post office were moved in the same year. However, most of the buildings in the new town were newly constructed, and many of the early merchants were from places other than Senex.

=== Original town design and development ===
The design of the original town was centered on a wide railroad ground, with eight blocks north of the tracks and eight blocks south of the tracks. Most of the early businesses were along Main Street north of the tracks. Both grain elevators and the early stockyards were north of the tracks, but the depot was on the south side. In 1876 the Lafayette Bloomington and Muncie Railroad was leased to the Lake Erie and Western Railroad which purchased the line in 1879, and the railroad is usually remembered under this name. Arrowsmith was incorporated as a village in April 1890. The growth of Arrowsmith was slow; in 1900 it had only 317 people.

== Geography ==
Arrowsmith is in eastern McLean County, 21 miles (34 km) east of Bloomington, the county seat, and 15 miles (24 km) west of Gibson City.

According to the U.S. Census Bureau, Arrowsmith has a total area of 0.20 square miles (0.52 km^{2}), all land. The village drains east and west to tributaries of the Sangamon River in its upper, east-flowing course. The village is part of the Illinois River watershed.

== Demographics ==
Historical population
| Census | Pop. | Note | %± |
|---|---|---|---|
| 1900 | 317 | | — |
| 1910 | 366 | | 15.5% |
| 1920 | 344 | | −6.0% |
| 1930 | 297 | | −13.7% |
| 1940 | 294 | | −1.0% |
| 1950 | 316 | | 7.5% |
| 1960 | 319 | | 0.9% |
| 1970 | 305 | | −4.4% |
| 1980 | 292 | | −4.3% |
| 1990 | 313 | | 7.2% |
| 2000 | 298 | | −4.8% |
| 2010 | 294 | | −1.3% |
| 2020 | 276 | | −6.1% |
Decennial US Census

As of the census of 2000, there were 298 people, 108 households, and 87 families residing in the village. The population density was 1,464.4 inhabitants per square mile (565.4/km^{2}). There were 117 housing units at an average density of 575.0 per square mile (222.0/km^{2}). The racial makeup of the village was 98.99% White, 0.34% Native American, and 0.67% from two or more races. Hispanic or Latino of any race were 0.67% of the population.

There were 108 households, out of which 37.0% had children under the age of 18 living with them, 70.4% were married couples living together, 4.6% had a female householder with no husband present, and 19.4% were non-families. 14.8% of all households were made up of individuals, and 10.2% had someone living alone who was 65 years of age or older. The average household size was 2.76 and the average family size was 3.09.

In the village, the population was spread out, with 27.5% under the age of 18, 10.4% from 18 to 24, 28.2% from 25 to 44, 20.8% from 45 to 64, and 13.1% who were 65 years of age or older. The median age was 34 years. For every 100 females, there were 87.4 males. For every 100 females age 18 and over, there were 96.4 males.

The median income for a household in the village was $49,375, and the median income for a family was $54,375. Males had a median income of $36,667 versus $25,179 for females. The per capita income for the village was $17,261. About 4.4% of families and 3.3% of the population were below the poverty line, including none of those under the age of eighteen and 3.2% of those 65 or over.
