= Arrowsmith Township, McLean County, Illinois =

Coordinates: 40°26′48″N 88°37′54″W

Arrowsmith Township
- Township
- Location in McLean County

- McLean County's location in Illinois
- Country: United States
- State: Illinois
- County: McLean
- Established: May 17, 1858

Area
  - Total: 36.11 sq mi (93.5 km^{2})
  - Land: 36.11 sq mi (93.5 km^{2})
  - Water: 0 sq mi (0 km^{2}) 0%

Population (2010)
  - Estimate (2016): 497
  - Density: 13.9/sq mi (5.4/km^{2})
- Time zone: UTC-6 (CST)
  - Summer (DST): UTC-5 (CDT)
- FIPS code: 17-113-02369

Arrowsmith Township is located in McLean County, Illinois. As of the 2010 census, its population was 502 and it contained 203 housing units. Arrowsmith Township is named for Ezekiel Arrowsmith (1811–1894), the first supervisor of the township. The township was originally called "Pleasant", but since there was already a Pleasant Township in Illinois, the name was changed in honor of the first superintendent. Arrowsmith Township changed its name from Pleasant Township on May 17, 1858.

The village of Arrowsmith is located in this township. Illinois Route 9 follows the northern boundary of the township. The Horizon Wind Energy Twin Groves Wind Farm is roughly centered in Arrowsmith township. Twin Groves is the largest utility-scale wind farm east of the Mississippi River.

== Geography ==
According to the 2010 census, the township has a total area of 36.11 square miles (93.5 km^{2}), all land.

== Demographics ==
Historical population
Census	Pop.	Note	%±
2016 (est.)	497
U.S. Decennial Census
