= Graining =

Faux finishing technique

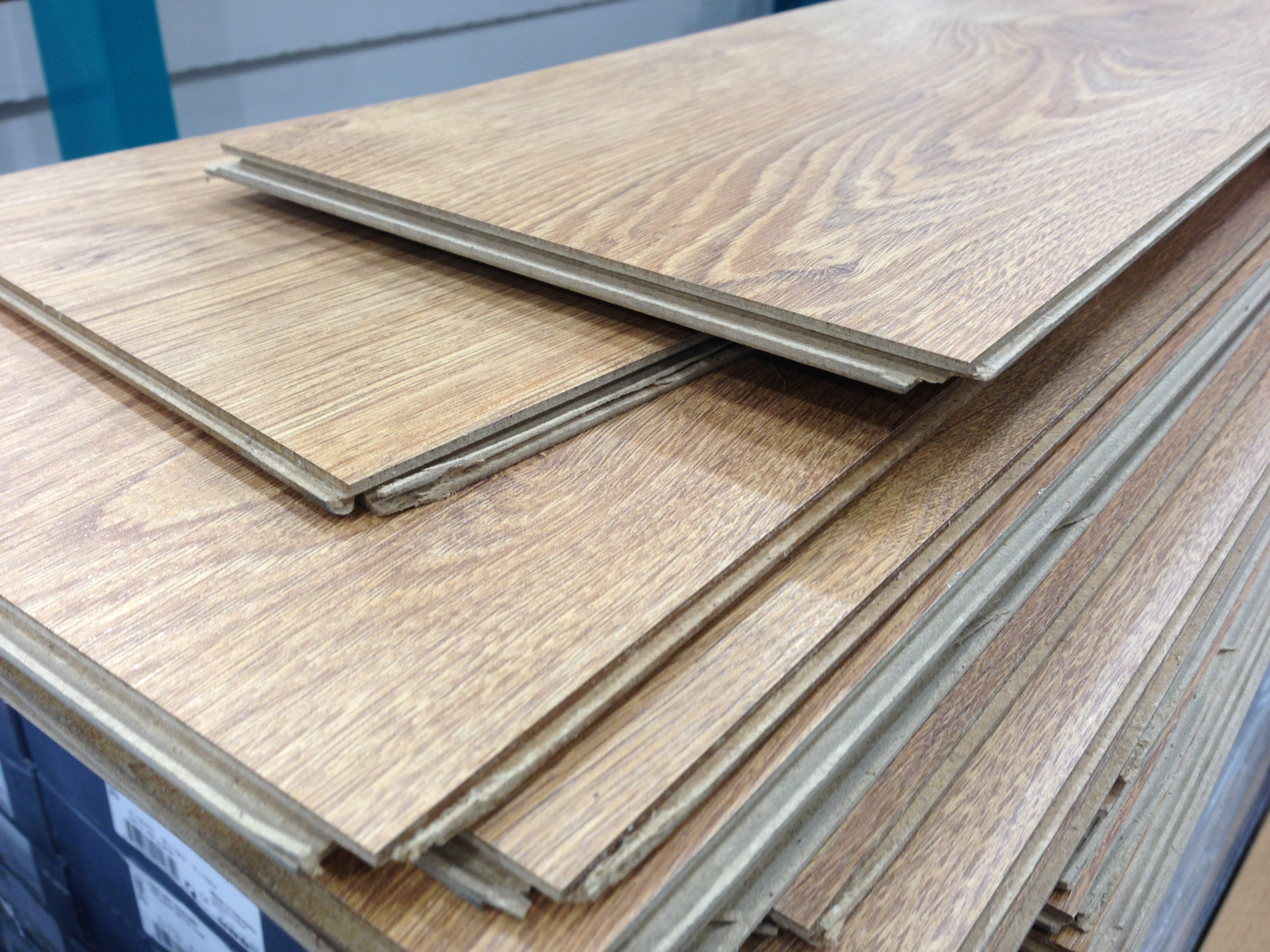
Imitation wood grain on plastic flooring

Graining is the practice of imitating wood grain on a non-wood surface, or on relatively undesirable wood surface, in order to give it the appearance of a rare or higher quality wood, thereby increasing that surface's aesthetic appeal. Graining was common in the 19th century, as people were keen on imitating hard, expensive woods by applying a superficial layer of paint onto soft, inexpensive woods or other hard surfaces.

Graining can be accomplished using either rudimentary tools or highly specialized tools. A specialized thick brush used for graining is often called a mottler. Fan brushes, floggers, softening brushes, texture combs and even fingers are used to create various effects. The painting is carried out in layers, with the first layer being a base. Today that is usually done with latex paint in a gold or orange or tan tone, depending on the type of wood the artist is aiming to imitat. A second layer of tempera or thinned paint is applied over the dry base, by means of a sponge or large inexpensive brush. During the 19th century, however, brushes were more commonly used. It can also be applied on bricks and brass, as is more common today.

Graining can also mean the production of any artificial texture on any surface. For example, in printing, making the smooth metal sheets used in modern printing processes coarse. A stoneworking equivalent of graining is marbling.

== History ==
A book entitled The Museum of Antiquity, in which a description is given of the Egyptian trades three thousand years ago, the following: Boxes, chairs, tables, etc., were often made of ebony inlaid with ivory, sycamore, and acacia veneering with thin layers and carved devices of rare woods added as ornament on inferior surfaces; and a fondness for display induced the Egyptians to paint common boards to imitate foreign varieties so generally practiced at the present day. The colors were usually applied on a thin coating of stucco or a ground smoothly laid on prepared wood and the various knots and grains made to resemble the wood they were intended to counterfeit. This account would appear to indicate that grainers were a professional class of artisans over three thousand years ago. Perhaps the principal reason why a decorator should be conversant with the production of graining is that sooner or later in his career he will may be called upon to execute it. This being so, he should be in a position to supply the demand.

Graining is the art of imitating the different types of natural wood grain. It ranges from simple Clair Bois to intricate English Walnut. The panelling of the great chamber of Theobalds House in England, used by James VI and I, was decorated in "walnut tree colour" in 1618 with highlighted mouldings in black and gold.

There are basically two types of wood graining: coarse (rustic) and fine (polite). In fine graining, layers are built up using water colors and finished with an oil glaze made of varnish, linseed oil and mineral spirits. Water colors use a beer solution tinted with a pigment, Indian inks, or Vandyke crystals dissolved in water. Vandyke crystals are very dark, almost a match for burnt umber but by varying the amount of water a color range from pale brown to nearly black can be obtained.

While wet, this thin layer may be given various textures by flogging, sponging, ragging or otherwise manipulating the paint. Another layer of figuring may be applied on top of the texture layer with an artist's brush to imitate the grain of particular woods. A softening brush may lightly passed over the wet paint to create the jagged edges typical of natural wood grain.

In 2017, the front door of the Hammond-Harwood House was restored with graining to match the original look of mahogany.

== Tools for graining ==
A few special tools, in addition to those employed in ordinary house painting, are necessary for graining, although it may be observed that some of the best examples of graining have been carried out with only a minimum of tools. While the experienced craftsman can often obtain just the effects required by the deft manipulation of an old rag or a wornout brush, it is an advantage for the beginner to have the proper implements.
