= Bentown, Illinois =

- Unincorporated community
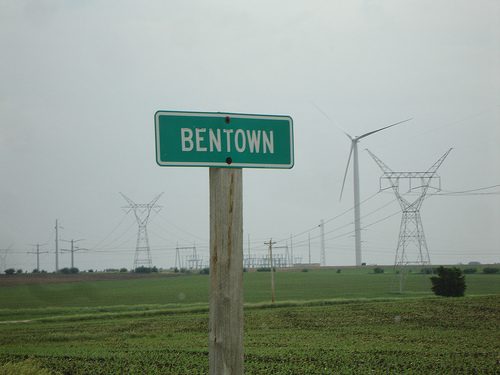
- Town sign with turbines in background

- Location within Illinois Location within the United States
- Coordinates: 40°28′19″N 88°48′23″W
- Country: United States
- State: Illinois
- County: McLean
- Elevation: 846 ft (258 m)
- Time zone: UTC-6 (Central (CST))
  - Summer (DST): UTC-5 (CDT)
- Area code: 309
- GNIS feature ID: 404196

Bentown is an unincorporated community in McLean County, Illinois, United States, named after the Benjamin family, a family that is long time residents of the area.

Situated 10 miles (16 km) east of Bloomington, this small town has recently received attention due to the construction of wind turbines nearby. Bentown lies 850 feet (260 m) above sea level.

== See also ==
- Benjaminville, Illinois
