= Dawson Township, McLean County, Illinois =

Coordinates: 40°26′13″N 88°45′09″W

Dawson Township
- Township
- Location in McLean County

- McLean County's location in Illinois
- Country: United States
- State: Illinois
- County: McLean
- Established: After 1920

Area
  - Total: 37.52 sq mi (97.2 km^{2})
  - Land: 37.26 sq mi (96.5 km^{2})
  - Water: 0.26 sq mi (0.67 km^{2}) 0.69%

Population (2010)
  - Estimate (2016): 590
  - Density: 15.8/sq mi (6.1/km^{2})
- Time zone: UTC-6 (CST)
  - Summer (DST): UTC-5 (CDT)
- FIPS code: 17-113-18732

Dawson Township is located in McLean County, Illinois. As of the 2010 census, its population was 590 and it contained 253 housing units.

== History ==
Dawson Township was originally named Lee Township, but changed to Padua Township on May 17, 1858, and then to Dawson on an unknown date. Dawson Township was named for John Wells Dawson, a pioneer settler.

== Geography ==
According to the 2010 census, the township has a total area of 37.52 square miles (97.2 km^{2}), of which 37.26 square miles (96.5 km^{2}) (or 99.31%) is land and 0.26 square miles (0.67 km^{2}) (or 0.69%) is water.

== Demographics ==
Historical population
Census	Pop.	Note	%±
2016 (est.)	590
U.S. Decennial Census

Dawson Township had 590 residents and 253 housing units as recorded in the 2010 U.S. Census. By 2023, the township’s population was estimated at 646 residents with a median age of approximately 44.4 years. The population of the Dawson area is predominantly White. As of 2023, White (Non-Hispanic) residents constituted 94.8% of the population. Black or African American (Non-Hispanic) residents comprised 3.42% of the population, and those identifying as Hispanic or Latino (of any race) represented 1.26% of the population.

The near-universal citizenship rate was recorded at 98.7% of residents. In 2023, the Median Individual Income for the township was reported to be $42,500. The Median Household Income for the township was notably higher at $82,880 (in 2023 dollars). This figure showed an increase of 6.6% compared to the previous year.

The distribution of household income in the Dawson area shows 36% of households earning between $50,000 and $100,000, and 33% earning between $100,000 and $200,000. The percentage of persons living below the poverty line in the township was approximately 6.2%. The Homeownership Rate for the Dawson was recorded at 76.2%, and the Average Car Ownership stood at two cars per household.
