= Holder, Illinois =

- Unincorporated community
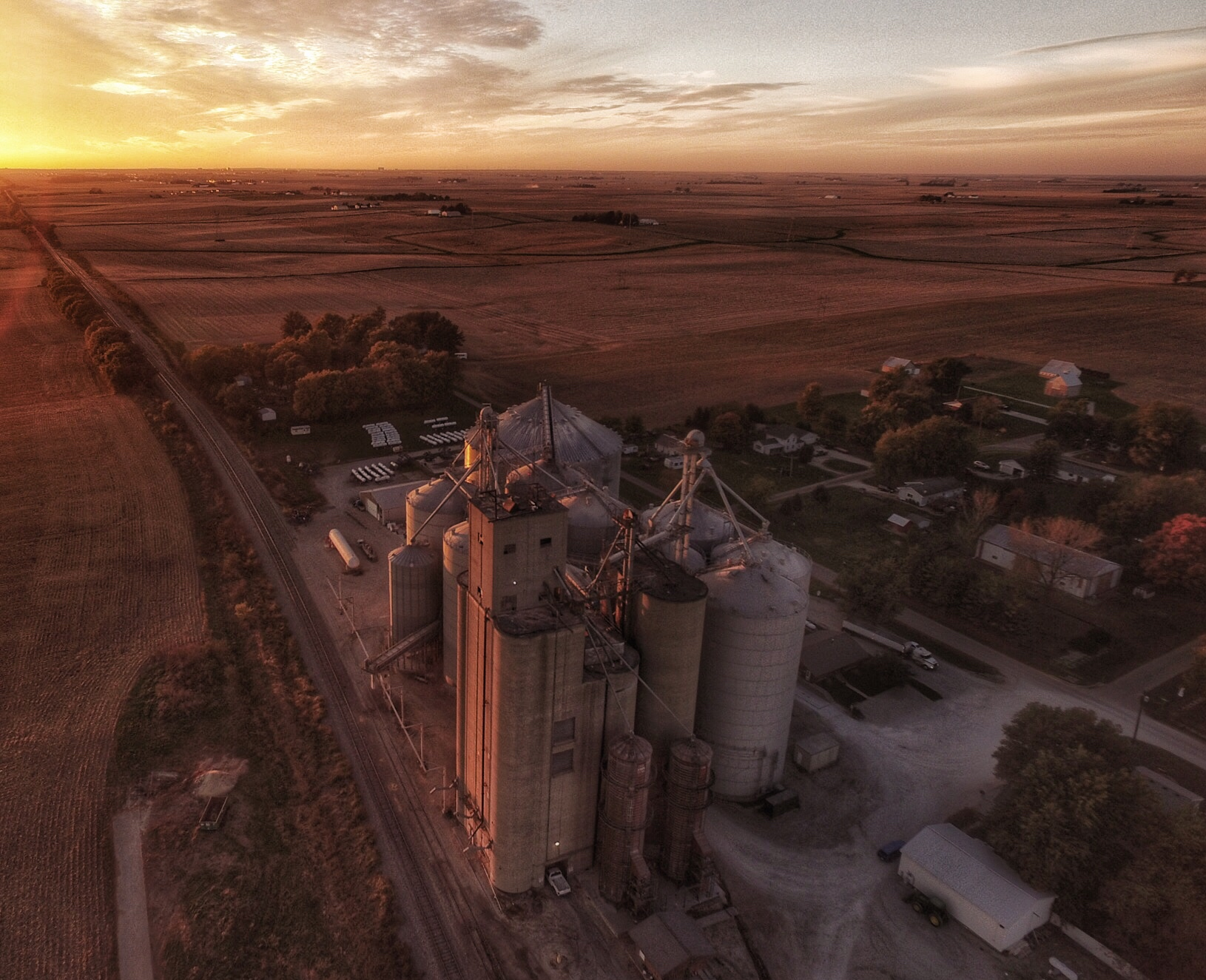
- Grain elevators in Holder, IL

- Location of Holder within Illinois Holder (the United States)
- Coordinates: 40°27′04″N 88°48′15″W
- Country: United States
- State: Illinois
- County: McLean County
- Township: Old Town Township
- Elevation: 840 ft (260 m)
- Time zone: UTC-6 (CST)
  - Summer (DST): UTC-5 (CDT)
- Area code: 309

Holder is an unincorporated community in Old Town Township, McLean County, Illinois.

== History ==
Holder was laid out 7 December 1871 by Charles W. Holder. Holder was a Bloomington land developer who was associated with the development of many towns including Towanda, Illinois, Normal, Illinois. and Lyons, Iowa. The Lafayette, Bloomington and Mississippi Railroad, for which Padua Township had supplied $30,000 worth of bonds. The location of the station came as a surprise to local people who had expected that it would be closer to the center of the Township. A store was moved to the new Town. By 1872 freight service had begun of the railroad. The original town consisted of four blocks on the north side of the depot grounds. The depot was on the south side of the tracks and early grain elevators were on both sides of the tracks.

== Geography ==
Holder is located at 40°27′4″N 88°48′15″W (40.4511462, -88.8042368), and is located east of Bloomington.

== Demographics ==
Holder consists of approximately 25 residential dwellings.
