= Old Town Township, McLean County, Illinois =

Coordinates: 40°26′42″N 88°51′37″W

Old Town Township
- Township
- Location in McLean County

- McLean County's location in Illinois
- Country: United States
- State: Illinois
- County: McLean
- Established: November 3, 1857

Area
  - Total: 35.49 sq mi (91.9 km^{2})
  - Land: 35.46 sq mi (91.8 km^{2})
  - Water: 0.03 sq mi (0.078 km^{2}) 0.08%

Population (2010)
  - Estimate (2016): 3,032
  - Density: 84.9/sq mi (32.8/km^{2})
- Time zone: UTC-6 (CST)
  - Summer (DST): UTC-5 (CDT)
- FIPS code: 17-113-55782
- Website: www.oldtowntownship-il.gov

Old Town Township is located in McLean County, Illinois. As of the 2010 census, its population was 3,010, and it contained 1,046 housing units.

== Geography ==
According to the 2010 census, the township has a total area of 35.49 square miles (91.9 km^{2}), of which 35.46 square miles (91.8 km^{2}) (or 99.92%) is land and 0.03 square miles (0.078 km^{2}) (or 0.08%) is water.

== Demographics ==
Historical population
Census	Pop.	Note	%±
2016 (est.)	3,032
U.S. Decennial Census
