= List of Illinois townships =

Illinois townships
- Map of the 1,426 townships in Illinois
- Category: Lower-level administrative division
- Location: Illinois
- Created: 1848
- Number: 1,426
- Populations: 34 (Cincinnati Township) – 170,478 (Rockford Township)
- Areas: 3.1 square miles (8.0 km^{2}) (Richwoods Township) – 112.8 square miles (292 km^{2}) (Rockford Township)
- Government: Township government

Of the 102 counties of the state of Illinois, 84 are organized into civil townships, usually referred to as simply "townships" in state law. All told, Illinois has 1,426 such townships, and they are the slight majority of the state's general units of local government.

The legal name of each township is the form "___ Township" or "Town of ____". State law specifies that no two townships in Illinois shall have the same name, and that, if the Illinois Secretary of State compares the township abstracts and finds a duplicate, the county that last adopted the name shall instead adopt a different name at the next county board meeting. Nonetheless, many township names remain duplicates in Illinois.

== History ==
After the Land Ordinance of 1785, the states of the United States from Ohio westward were gradually surveyed and divided relative to principal meridians and baselines into areas of six square miles, called townships.

Local government in the Illinois Territory, and the state of Illinois after 1818 statehood, was predominantly handled by the state's counties, although towns and villages also existed. Chicago was chartered as the state's first city in 1837.

The 1848 Constitution of Illinois granted the voters of counties the ability to divide their county into townships.

== Other forms ==
Cook County is organized into townships except for the cities of Chicago and Evanston, Illinois: voters in Chicago chose to abolish the eight townships in the city in 1902, and the single township in Evanston in 2014.

There are 17 counties with no township government: Alexander, Calhoun, Edwards, Hardin, Johnson, Massac, Menard, Monroe, Morgan, Perry, Pope, Pulaski, Randolph, Scott, Union, Wabash, and Williamson. Each of those counties is instead divided into precincts. Unlike townships, precincts have no functions in and of themselves and all their administrative functions are performed by the county.

Counties that have no townships.

== Organization and naming ==
The operation of townships in Illinois is established primarily by the Township Code (60 ILCS 1). Each county has the option to adopt or discontinue the township form of government.

Each township name is chosen by "in accordance with the express wish of the inhabitants"; but if "there is not a degree of unanimity as to the name", then the name may be chosen by the commissioners that are dividing the county into townships. In addition, if the county board is petitioned by a majority of the township's voters, the board may change the township's name.

Each township is governed by an elected board, which consists of a supervisor plus four trustees. There are special provisions for automatic creation of a township in any city or village where township organization has been chosen for the county but some of the municipality's territory does not yet have an organized township; for consolidating the territory of a city across multiple townships into a single township for the city at the voters' request; and for creating an optional "coterminous" township that follow the borders of a city in most circumstances and allows the city council to act as the township board.

=== Powers ===
60 ILCS 1/85-13 enumerates general services that townships are allowed to spend money on:

- Public safety (including law enforcement, fire protection, and building code enforcement).
- Environmental protection (including sewage disposal, sanitation, and pollution abatement).
- Public transportation (including transit systems, paratransit systems, and streets and roads).
- Health.
- Recreation.
- Libraries.
- Social services for the poor and aged.
- Development and retention of business, industrial, manufacturing, and tourist facilities within the township.

Other parts of 60 ILCS 1 authorize townships to provide cemeteries, comfort stations, community buildings, hospitals, monuments, open spaces, parks, facilities for the developmentally disabled, and disposal of brush and leaves. After approval by a referendum, a township may also provide water and sewer services and general waste collection.

== Townships ==
Township	County
Abington	Mercer
Adams	LaSalle
Addison	DuPage
Aetna	Logan
Afton	DeKalb
Akron	Peoria
Alba	Henry
Albany	Whiteside
Alden	McHenry
Algonquin	McHenry
Alhambra	Madison
Allen	LaSalle
Allens Grove	Mason
Allin	McLean
Allison	Lawrence
Alma	Marion
Alto	Lee
Alton	Madison
Amboy	Lee
Amity	Livingston
Anchor	McLean
Andalusia	Rock Island
Anderson	Clark
Andover	Henry
Annawan	Henry
Antioch	Lake
Appanoose	Hancock
Apple River	Jo Daviess
Arcola	Douglas
Arenzville	Cass
Arispie	Bureau
Aroma	Kankakee
Arrington	Wayne
Arrowsmith	McLean
Artesia	Iroquois
Asbury	Gallatin
Ash Grove	Iroquois
Ash Grove	Shelby
Ashkum	Iroquois
Ashland	Cass
Ashley	Washington
Ashmore	Coles
Ashton	Lee
Assumption	Christian
Astoria	Fulton
Athensville	Greene
Atkinson	Henry
Atlanta	Logan
Atlas	Pike
Auburn	Clark
Auburn	Sangamon
Audubon	Montgomery
Augusta	Hancock
Aurora	Kane
Austin	Macon
Aux Sable	Grundy
Avena	Fayette
Avoca	Livingston
Avon	Lake
Ayers	Champaign
Bainbridge	Schuyler
Bald Bluff	Henderson
Bald Hill	Jefferson
Ball	Sangamon
Banner	Effingham
Banner	Fulton
Barnett	DeWitt
Barnhill	Wayne
Barr	Macoupin
Barren	Franklin
Barrington	Cook
Barry	Pike
Batavia	Kane
Bath	Mason
Bear Creek	Christian
Bear Creek	Hancock
Bear Grove	Fayette
Beardstown	Cass
Beaucoup	Washington
Beaver Creek	Hamilton
Beaver	Iroquois
Beaverville	Iroquois
Bedford	Wayne
Bell Plain	Marshall
Belle Prairie	Livingston
Bellflower	McLean
Belmont	Iroquois
Belvidere	Boone
Bement	Piatt
Bennington	Marshall
Benton	Franklin
Benton	Lake
Berlin	Bureau
Bernadotte	Fulton
Berreman	Jo Daviess
Berry	Wayne
Berwick	Warren
Berwyn	Cook
Bethel	McDonough
Beverly	Adams
Bible Grove	Clay
Big Grove	Kendall
Big Mound	Wayne
Big Rock	Kane
Big Spring	Shelby
Biggsville	Henderson
Bird	Macoupin
Birmingham	Schuyler
Bishop	Effingham
Blackberry	Kane
Blackhawk	Rock Island
Blair	Clay
Blandinsville	McDonough
Blissville	Jefferson
Bloom	Cook
Bloomingdale	DuPage
Bloomington	McLean
Bloomington City	McLean
Blount	Vermilion
Blue Mound	McLean
Blue Mound	Macon
Blue Ridge	Piatt
Bluff Springs	Cass
Bluffdale	Greene
Bois D'Arc	Montgomery
Bolo	Washington
Bond	Lawrence
Bonpas	Richland
Bonus	Boone
Boone	Boone
Bourbon	Douglas
Bourbonnais	Kankakee
Bowdre	Douglas
Bowlesville	Gallatin
Bowling Green	Fayette
Bowling	Rock Island
Boynton	Tazewell
Braceville	Grundy
Bradford	Lee
Bradley	Jackson
Breese	Clinton
Bremen	Cook
Brenton	Ford
Bridgeport	Lawrence
Brighton	Macoupin
Brimfield	Peoria
Bristol	Kendall
Broadwell	Logan
Brookfield	LaSalle
Brooklyn	Lee
Brooklyn	Schuyler
Brookside	Clinton
Brookville	Ogle
Broughton	Livingston
Brouilletts Creek	Edgar
Brown	Champaign
Browning	Franklin
Browning	Schuyler
Bruce	LaSalle
Brushy Mound	Macoupin
Brushy	Saline
Buck	Edgar
Buckeye	Stephenson
Buckhart	Christian
Buckheart	Fulton
Buckhorn	Brown
Buena Vista	Schuyler
Buffalo Hart	Sangamon
Buffalo Prairie	Rock Island
Buffalo	Ogle
Bunker Hill	Macoupin
Bureau	Bureau
Burgess	Bond
Burlington	Kane
Burns	Henry
Burnt Prairie	White
Burritt	Winnebago
Burton	Adams
Burton	McHenry
Bushnell	McDonough
Butler Grove	Montgomery
Butler	Vermilion
Button	Ford
Byron	Ogle
Cahokia	Macoupin
Caledonia	Boone
Calumet	Cook
Camargo	Douglas
Cambridge	Henry
Camden	Schuyler
Camp Point	Adams
Campton	Kane
Canoe Creek	Rock Island
Canteen	St. Clair
Canton	Fulton
Capital	Sangamon
Carbondale	Jackson
Carlinville	Macoupin
Carlyle	Clinton
Carman	Henderson
Carmi	White
Carrier Mills	Saline
Carrigan	Marion
Carroll	Vermilion
Carrollton	Greene
Carson	Fayette
Carthage	Hancock
Cartwright	Sangamon
Casey	Clark
Caseyville	St. Clair
Casner	Jefferson
Cass	Fulton
Catlin	Vermilion
Cave	Franklin
Cazenovia	Woodford
Cedar	Knox
Central	Bond
Centralia	Marion
Centreville	St. Clair
Cerro Gordo	Piatt
Chalmers	McDonough
Chambersburg	Pike
Champaign	Champaign
Champaign City	Champaign
Chandlerville	Cass
Channahon	Will
Charleston	Coles
Charlotte	Livingston
Chatham	Sangamon
Chatsworth	Livingston
Chebanse	Iroquois
Chemung	McHenry
Cheney's Grove	McLean
Chenoa	McLean
Cherry Grove–Shannon	Carroll
Cherry Valley	Winnebago
Chester	Logan
Chesterfield	Macoupin
Chestnut	Knox
Chili	Hancock
Chillicothe	Peoria
Chouteau	Madison
Christy	Lawrence
Cicero	Cook
Cincinnati	Pike
Cincinnati	Tazewell
Claremont	Richland
Clarion	Bureau
Clarksburg	Shelby
Clay City	Clay
Clayton	Adams
Clayton	Woodford
Clear Lake	Sangamon
Clement	Clinton
Clinton	DeKalb
Clintonia	DeWitt
Clover	Henry
Clyde	Whiteside
Coal Valley	Rock Island
Coe	Rock Island
Colchester	McDonough
Cold Brook	Warren
Cold Spring	Shelby
Colfax	Champaign
Collinsville	Madison
Coloma	Whiteside
Colona	Henry
Columbus	Adams
Compromise	Champaign
Concord	Adams
Concord	Bureau
Concord	Iroquois
Condit	Champaign
Cooper	Sangamon
Cooperstown	Brown
Copley	Knox
Coral	McHenry
Cordova	Rock Island
Cornwall	Henry
Cortland	DeKalb
Corwin	Logan
Cottage	Saline
Cotton Hill	Sangamon
Cottonwood	Cumberland
Council Hill	Jo Daviess
Covington	Washington
Crane Creek	Mason
Creek	DeWitt
Crescent	Iroquois
Crete	Will
Crittenden	Champaign
Crook	Hamilton
Crooked Creek	Cumberland
Crooked Creek	Jasper
Cropsey	McLean
Crouch	Hamilton
Cruger	Woodford
Cuba	Lake
Cunningham	Champaign
Curran	Sangamon
Custer	Will
Dahlgren	Hamilton
Dakota	Stephenson
Dale	McLean
Dallas City	Hancock
Danforth	Iroquois
Danvers	McLean
Danville	Vermilion
Darwin	Clark
Dawson	McLean
Dayton	LaSalle
Decatur	Macon
Decker	Richland
Deer Creek	Tazewell
Deer Park	LaSalle
Deerfield	Fulton
Degognia	Jackson
DeKalb	DeKalb
Delavan	Tazewell
Dement	Ogle
Denison	Lawrence
Denning	Franklin
Denver	Richland
Derinda	Jo Daviess
Derry	Pike
DeSoto	Jackson
Detroit	Pike
DeWitt	DeWitt
Dillon	Tazewell
Dimmick	LaSalle
Divernon	Sangamon
Dix	Ford
Dixon	Lee
Dodds	Jefferson
Dolson	Clark
Dora	Moultrie
Dorchester	Macoupin
Dorr	McHenry
Douglas	Clark
Douglas	Effingham
Douglas	Iroquois
Dover	Bureau
Downers Grove	DuPage
Downs	McLean
Drummer	Ford
Drury	Rock Island
Dry Grove	McLean
Dry Point	Shelby
Du Bois	Washington
Duncan	Mercer
Dundee	Kane
Dunham	McHenry
Dunleith	Jo Daviess
DuPage	Will
Durand	Winnebago
Durham	Hancock
Dwight	Livingston
Eagle Creek	Gallatin
Eagle Point	Ogle
Eagle	LaSalle
Earl	LaSalle
East Bend	Champaign
East Eldorado	Saline
East Fork	Clinton
East Fork	Montgomery
East Galena	Jo Daviess
East Grove	Lee
East Lincoln	Logan
East Nelson	Moultrie
East Oakland	Coles
East St. Louis	St. Clair
Eastern	Franklin
Eden	LaSalle
Edford	Henry
Edgar	Edgar
Edgington	Rock Island
Edwardsville	Madison
El Paso	Woodford
Ela	Lake
Elba	Knox
Elbridge	Edgar
Eldorado	McDonough
Elgin	Kane
Eliza	Mercer
Elizabeth	Jo Daviess
Elk Grove	Cook
Elk Prairie	Jefferson
Elk	Jackson
Elkhart	Logan
Elkhorn Grove	Carroll
Elkhorn	Brown
Ellington	Adams
Ellison	Warren
Ellisville	Fulton
Elm Grove	Tazewell
Elm River	Wayne
Elmira	Stark
Elmwood	Peoria
Elsah	Jersey
Elwood	Vermilion
Embarrass	Edgar
Eminence	Logan
Emma	White
Emmet	McDonough
Empire	McLean
Enfield	White
Engelmann	St. Clair
English	Jersey
Eppards Point	Livingston
Equality	Gallatin
Erie	Whiteside
Erienna	Grundy
Erin	Stephenson
Esmen	Livingston
Essex	Kankakee
Essex	Stark
Evans	Marshall
Ewing	Franklin
Fairfield	Bureau
Fairhaven	Carroll
Fairmount	Pike
Fairview	Fulton
Fall Creek	Adams
Fall River	LaSalle
Fancy Creek	Sangamon
Farm Ridge	LaSalle
Farmers	Fulton
Farmington	Fulton
Farrington	Jefferson
Fayette	Livingston
Fayetteville	St. Clair
Felix	Grundy
Fenton	Whiteside
Fidelity	Jersey
Field	Jefferson
Fillmore	Montgomery
Flagg	Ogle
Flannigan	Hamilton
Flat Branch	Shelby
Flint	Pike
Flora	Boone
Florence	Stephenson
Florence	Will
Floyd	Warren
Fondulac	Tazewell
Forest City	Mason
Forrest	Livingston
Forreston	Ogle
Fort Russell	Madison
Foster	Madison
Foster	Marion
Fountain Bluff	Jackson
Fountain Creek	Iroquois
Fountain Green	Hancock
Four Mile	Wayne
Fox	Jasper
Fox	Kendall
Frankfort	Franklin
Frankfort	Will
Franklin Grove	Lee
Franklin	DeKalb
Frederick	Schuyler
Freeburg	St. Clair
Freedom	Carroll
Freedom	LaSalle
Freeport	Stephenson
Fremont	Lake
Friends Creek	Macon
Fulton	Whiteside
Funk's Grove	McLean
Galatia	Saline
Galesburg	Knox
Galesburg City	Knox
Galva	Henry
Ganeer	Kankakee
Garden Hill	Wayne
Garden Plain	Whiteside
Gardner	Sangamon
Garfield	Grundy
Garrett	Douglas
Genesee	Whiteside
Geneseo	Henry
Geneva	Kane
Genoa	DeKalb
Georgetown	Vermilion
German	Richland
Germantown	Clinton
Germanville	Livingston
Gillespie	Macoupin
Gilmer	Adams
Girard	Macoupin
Gladstone	Henderson
Godfrey	Madison
Gold Hill	Gallatin
Gold	Bureau
Goode	Franklin
Goodfarm	Grundy
Goose Creek	Piatt
Goose Lake	Grundy
Goshen	Stark
Grafton	McHenry
Grand Detour	Ogle
Grand Prairie	Jefferson
Grand Rapids	LaSalle
Grand Tower	Jackson
Grandview	Edgar
Grandville	Jasper
Granite City	Madison
Grant	Lake
Grant	Vermilion
Granville	Putnam
Gray	White
Green Garden	Will
Greenbush	Warren
Greene	Mercer
Greene	Woodford
Greenfield	Grundy
Greenup	Cumberland
Greenville	Bureau
Greenwood	Christian
Greenwood	McHenry
Gridley	McLean
Griggsville	Pike
Grisham	Montgomery
Grove	Jasper
Groveland	LaSalle
Groveland	Tazewell
Grover	Wayne
Guilford	Jo Daviess
Hadley	Pike
Hagener	Cass
Hahnaman	Whiteside
Haines	Marion
Hale	Warren
Hall	Bureau
Hallock	Peoria
Hamel	Madison
Hamilton	Lee
Hampshire	Kane
Hampton	Rock Island
Hancock	Hancock
Hanna	Henry
Hanover	Cook
Hanover	Jo Daviess
Hardin	Pike
Harlem	Stephenson
Harlem	Winnebago
Harmon	Lee
Harmony	Hancock
Harp	DeWitt
Harris	Fulton
Harrisburg	Saline
Harrison	Winnebago
Harristown	Macon
Harter	Clay
Hartland	McHenry
Harvel	Montgomery
Harwood	Champaign
Havana	Mason
Haw Creek	Knox
Hawthorne	White
Hebron	McHenry
Helvetia	Madison
Henderson	Knox
Hennepin	Putnam
Henry	Marshall
Hensley	Champaign
Heralds Prairie	White
Herrick	Shelby
Hickory Hill	Wayne
Hickory Point	Macon
Hickory	Schuyler
Highland	Grundy
Hillsboro	Montgomery
Hillyard	Macoupin
Hire	McDonough
Hittle	Tazewell
Holland	Shelby
Hollis	Peoria
Homer	Will
Honey Creek	Adams
Honey Creek	Crawford
Honey Point	Macoupin
Hoosier	Clay
Hope	LaSalle
Hopedale	Tazewell
Hopewell	Marshall
Hopkins	Whiteside
Houston	Adams
Hoyleton	Washington
Hudson	McLean
Humboldt	Coles
Hume	Whiteside
Hunt City	Jasper
Hunter	Edgar
Huntsville	Schuyler
Hurlbut	Logan
Hurricane	Fayette
Hutsonville	Crawford
Hutton	Coles
Illini	Macon
Illiopolis	Sangamon
Independence	Saline
Indian Creek	White
Indian Grove	Livingston
Indian Point	Knox
Indian Prairie	Wayne
Indiantown	Bureau
Industry	McDonough
Irishtown	Clinton
Iroquois	Iroquois
Irving	Montgomery
Irvington	Washington
Isabel	Fulton
Island Grove	Sangamon
Iuka	Marion
Jackson	Effingham
Jackson	Will
Jamaica	Vermilion
Jarvis	Madison
Jasper	Wayne
Jefferson	Stephenson
Jersey	Jersey
Johannisburg	Washington
Johnson	Christian
Johnson	Clark
Joliet	Will
Jonathan Creek	Moultrie
Jordan	Whiteside
Joshua	Fulton
Jubilee	Peoria
Kane	Greene
Kaneville	Kane
Kankakee	Kankakee
Kansas	Edgar
Kansas	Woodford
Kaskaskia	Fayette
Keene	Adams
Keith	Wayne
Keithsburg	Mercer
Kelly	Warren
Kendall	Kendall
Kent	Stephenson
Kerr	Champaign
Kerton	Fulton
Kewanee	Henry
Kickapoo	Peoria
Kilbourne	Mason
Kinderhook	Pike
King	Christian
Kingston	DeKalb
Kinkaid	Jackson
Kinmundy	Marion
Knights Prairie	Hamilton
Knox	Knox
La Harpe	Hancock
La Prairie	Marshall
LaClede	Fayette
Lacon	Marshall
Laenna	Logan
Lafayette	Coles
LaFayette	Ogle
Lagrange	Bond
Lake Fork	Logan
Lake	Clinton
Lake Villa	Lake
Lakewood	Shelby
LaMard	Wayne
Lamoille	Bureau
Lamoine	McDonough
Lamotte	Crawford
Lancaster	Stephenson
Lanesville	Sangamon
Laona	Winnebago
Larkinsburg	Clay
LaSalle	LaSalle
Lawndale	McLean
Lawrence	Lawrence
Leaf River	Ogle
Lebanon	St. Clair
Lee Center	Lee
Lee	Brown
Lee	Fulton
Leech	Wayne
Leef	Madison
Leepertown	Bureau
Lemont	Cook
Lenox	Warren
Lenzburg	St. Clair
Leroy	Boone
Levan	Jackson
Levee	Pike
Lewistown	Fulton
Lexington	McLean
Leyden	Cook
Liberty	Adams
Liberty	Effingham
Libertyville	Lake
Licking	Crawford
Lima	Adams
Limestone	Kankakee
Limestone	Peoria
Lincoln	Ogle
Linder	Greene
Linn	Woodford
Lisbon	Kendall
Lisle	DuPage
Little Mackinaw	Tazewell
Little Rock	Kendall
Littleton	Schuyler
Lively Grove	Washington
Liverpool	Fulton
Loami	Sangamon
Lockport	Will
Locust	Christian
Loda	Iroquois
Logan	Peoria
Lomax	Henderson
Lone Grove	Fayette
Long Branch	Saline
Long Creek	Macon
Long Point	Livingston
Looking Glass	Clinton
Loraine	Henry
Loran	Stephenson
Loudon	Fayette
Louisville	Clay
Love	Vermilion
Lovejoy	Iroquois
Lovington	Moultrie
Lowe	Moultrie
Lucas	Effingham
Ludlow	Champaign
Lukin	Lawrence
Lyman	Ford
Lynchburg	Mason
Lyndon	Whiteside
Lynn	Henry
Lynn	Knox
Lynnville	Ogle
Lyons	Cook
Mackinaw	Tazewell
Macomb	McDonough
Macomb City	McDonough
Macon	Bureau
Madison	Richland
Magnolia	Putnam
Mahomet	Champaign
Maine	Cook
Maine	Grundy
Makanda	Jackson
Malone	Tazewell
Malta	DeKalb
Manchester	Boone
Manhattan	Will
Manito	Mason
Manlius	Bureau
Manlius	LaSalle
Manteno	Kankakee
Maquon	Knox
Marengo	McHenry
Marine	Madison
Marion	Lee
Marion	Ogle
Marissa	St. Clair
Maroa	Macon
Marrowbone	Moultrie
Marshall	Clark
Martin	Crawford
Martin	McLean
Martinsburg	Pike
Martinsville	Clark
Martinton	Iroquois
Maryland	Ogle
Mascoutah	St. Clair
Mason City	Mason
Mason	Effingham
Massilon	Wayne
Mattoon	Coles
Maxwell	Sangamon
May	Christian
May	Lee
Mayberry	Hamilton
Mayfield	DeKalb
Mazon	Grundy
McClellan	Jefferson
McHenry	McHenry
McKee	Adams
McKendree	Vermilion
McLeansboro	Hamilton
Meacham	Marion
Mechanicsburg	Sangamon
Media	Henderson
Medina	Peoria
Melrose	Adams
Melrose	Clark
Mendon	Adams
Mendota	LaSalle
Menominee	Jo Daviess
Mercer	Mercer
Meriden	LaSalle
Meridian	Clinton
Metamora	Woodford
Middlefork	Vermilion
Middleport	Iroquois
Milan	DeKalb
Milford	Iroquois
Milks Grove	Iroquois
Mill Shoals	White
Millbrook	Peoria
Miller	LaSalle
Millersburg	Mercer
Mills	Bond
Millstadt	St. Clair
Milo	Bureau
Milton	DuPage
Mineral	Bureau
Minonk	Woodford
Mission	LaSalle
Mississippi	Jersey
Missouri	Brown
Moccasin	Effingham
Moline	Rock Island
Momence	Kankakee
Mona	Ford
Monee	Will
Money Creek	McLean
Monmouth	Warren
Monroe	Ogle
Montebello	Hancock
Montezuma	Pike
Montgomery	Crawford
Montgomery	Woodford
Monticello	Piatt
Montmorency	Whiteside
Moore's Prairie	Jefferson
Moraine	Lake
Morgan	Coles
Moro	Madison
Morris	Grundy
Morton	Tazewell
Mosquito	Christian
Mound	Effingham
Mound	McDonough
Mount Auburn	Christian
Mount Carroll	Carroll
Mount Erie	Wayne
Mount Hope	McLean
Mount Morris	Ogle
Mount Olive	Macoupin
Mount Pleasant	Whiteside
Mount Pulaski	Logan
Mount Sterling	Brown
Mount Vernon	Jefferson
Mount Zion	Macon
Mountain	Saline
Moweaqua	Shelby
Mulberry Grove	Bond
Munson	Henry
Murdock	Douglas
Murphysboro	Jackson
Na-Au-Say	Kendall
Nachusa	Lee
Nameoki	Madison
Naperville	DuPage
Nashville	Washington
Nauvoo	Hancock
Nebraska	Livingston
Nelson	Lee
Neoga	Cumberland
Neponset	Bureau
Nettle Creek	Grundy
Nevada	Livingston
New Athens	St. Clair
New Berlin	Sangamon
New Boston	Mercer
New Douglas	Madison
New Haven	Gallatin
New Lenox	Will
New Salem	McDonough
New Salem	Pike
New Trier	Cook
Newburg	Pike
Newcomb	Champaign
Newell	Vermilion
Newman	Douglas
Newmansville	Cass
Newport	Lake
Newton	Whiteside
Newtown	Livingston
Niantic	Macon
Niles	Cook
Nilwood	Macoupin
Nixon	DeWitt
Noble	Richland
Nokomis	Montgomery
Nora	Jo Daviess
Normal	McLean
Norman	Grundy
North Fork	Gallatin
North Henderson	Mercer
North Litchfield	Montgomery
North Muddy	Jasper
North Okaw	Coles
North Otter	Macoupin
North Palmyra	Macoupin
Northeast	Adams
Northern	Franklin
Northfield	Cook
Northville	LaSalle
Norton	Kankakee
Norwood Park	Cook
Nunda	McHenry
O'Fallon	St. Clair
Oak Park	Cook
Oakdale	Washington
Oakland	Schuyler
Oakley	Macon
Oakwood	Vermilion
Oblong	Crawford
Oconee	Shelby
Odell	Livingston
Odin	Marion
Ogden	Champaign
Ohio Grove	Mercer
Ohio	Bureau
Okaw	Shelby
Okawville	Washington
Old Ripley	Bond
Old Town	McLean
Olio	Woodford
Olive	Madison
Olney	Richland
Omaha	Gallatin
Omega	Marion
Omphghent	Madison
Onarga	Iroquois
Oneco	Stephenson
Ontario	Knox
Ophir	LaSalle
Oquawka	Henderson
Ora	Jackson
Oran	Logan
Orange	Clark
Orange	Knox
Orchard	Wayne
Oregon-Nashua	Ogle
Orel	Wayne
Orion	Fulton
Orland	Cook
Orvil	Logan
Osage	LaSalle
Osceola	Stark
Osco	Henry
Oskaloosa	Clay
Oswego	Kendall
Otego	Fayette
Ottawa	LaSalle
Otter Creek	Jersey
Otter Creek	LaSalle
Otto	Kankakee
Owego	Livingston
Owen	Winnebago
Oxford	Henry
Palatine	Cook
Palestine	Woodford
Palmyra	Lee
Palos	Cook
Pana	Christian
Panola	Woodford
Panther Creek	Cass
Papineau	Iroquois
Paradise	Coles
Paris	Edgar
Parker	Clark
Partridge	Woodford
Patoka	Marion
Patterson	Greene
Patton	Ford
Paw Paw	DeKalb
Pawnee	Sangamon
Payson	Adams
Pea Ridge	Brown
Peach Orchard	Ford
Pearl	Pike
Pecatonica	Winnebago
Pekin	Tazewell
Pella	Ford
Pembroke	Kankakee
Pendleton	Jefferson
Penn	Shelby
Penn	Stark
Pennsylvania	Mason
Peoria City	Peoria
Peotone	Will
Perry	Pike
Perryton	Mercer
Persifer	Knox
Peru	LaSalle
Pesotum	Champaign
Petty	Lawrence
Philadelphia	Cass
Phillips	White
Philo	Champaign
Phenix	Henry
Piasa	Jersey
Pickaway	Shelby
Pierce	DeKalb
Pigeon Grove	Iroquois
Pike	Livingston
Pilot Grove	Hancock
Pilot Knob	Washington
Pilot	Kankakee
Pilot	Vermilion
Pin Oak	Madison
Pine Creek	Ogle
Pine Rock	Ogle
Pitman	Montgomery
Pittsfield	Pike
Pixley	Clay
Plainfield	Will
Plato	Kane
Pleasant Grove	Coles
Pleasant Hill	Pike
Pleasant Mound	Bond
Pleasant Ridge	Livingston
Pleasant	Fulton
Pleasant Vale	Pike
Pleasant Valley	Jo Daviess
Pleasant View	Macon
Plum Hill	Washington
Point Pleasant	Warren
Polk	Macoupin
Pomona	Jackson
Pontiac	Livingston
Pontoosuc	Hancock
Pope	Fayette
Poplar Grove	Boone
Port Byron	Rock Island
Portland	Whiteside
Prairie City	McDonough
Prairie Creek	Logan
Prairie du Long	St. Clair
Prairie Green	Iroquois
Prairie	Crawford
Prairie	Edgar
Prairie	Hancock
Prairie	Shelby
Prairieton	Christian
Preemption	Mercer
Preston	Richland
Princeton	Bureau
Princeville	Peoria
Prophetstown	Whiteside
Proviso	Cook
Putman	Fulton
Quarry	Jersey
Quincy	Adams
Quiver	Mason
Raccoon	Marion
Radnor	Peoria
Raleigh	Saline
Ramsey	Fayette
Randolph	McLean
Rantoul	Champaign
Raritan	Henderson
Rawlins	Jo Daviess
Raymond	Champaign
Raymond	Montgomery
Reading	Livingston
Rector	Saline
Reed	Will
Reynolds	Lee
Rice	Jo Daviess
Rich	Cook
Richfield	Adams
Richland Grove	Mercer
Richland	LaSalle
Richland	Marshall
Richland	Shelby
Richmond	McHenry
Richview	Washington
Richwood	Jersey
Richwoods	Peoria
Ricks	Christian
Ridge	Shelby
Ridgeland	Iroquois
Ridgway	Gallatin
Ridott	Stephenson
Riley	McHenry
Rio	Knox
Ripley	Brown
River Forest	Cook
Riverside	Adams
Riverside	Cook
Rivoli	Mercer
Roanoke	Woodford
Roberts	Marshall
Robinson	Crawford
Rochester	Sangamon
Rock Creek	Hancock
Rock Creek–Lima	Carroll
Rock Grove	Stephenson
Rock Island	Rock Island
Rock Run	Stephenson
Rockbridge	Greene
Rockford	Winnebago
Rockton	Winnebago
Rockvale	Ogle
Rockville	Kankakee
Rocky Run-Wilcox	Hancock
Rogers	Ford
Rome	Jefferson
Romine	Marion
Roodhouse	Greene
Rooks Creek	Livingston
Rosamond	Christian
Roscoe	Winnebago
Rose	Shelby
Rosedale	Jersey
Rosefield	Peoria
Roseville	Warren
Ross	Edgar
Ross	Pike
Ross	Vermilion
Round Grove	Livingston
Rountree	Montgomery
Rozetta	Henderson
Rubicon	Greene
Rural	Rock Island
Rural	Shelby
Rush	Jo Daviess
Rushville	Schuyler
Russell	Lawrence
Rutland	Kane
Rutland	LaSalle
Rutledge	DeWitt
Ruyle	Jersey
Sadorus	Champaign
Saint Rose	Clinton
Sainte Marie	Jasper
Salem	Carroll
Salem	Knox
Salem	Marion
Salina	Kankakee
Saline	Madison
Salt Creek	Mason
Sand Prairie	Tazewell
Sand Ridge	Jackson
Sandoval	Marion
Sandwich	DeKalb
Sangamon	Piatt
Sangamon Valley	Cass
Santa Anna	DeWitt
Santa Fe	Clinton
Saratoga	Grundy
Saratoga	Marshall
Sargent	Douglas
Saunemin	Livingston
Savanna	Carroll
Scales Mound	Jo Daviess
Schaumburg	Cook
Sciota	McDonough
Scotland	McDonough
Scott	Champaign
Scott	Ogle
Scottville	Macoupin
Sefton	Fayette
Selby	Bureau
Seminary	Fayette
Senachwine	Putnam
Seneca	McHenry
Serena	LaSalle
Seven Hickory	Coles
Seward	Kendall
Seward	Winnebago
Shabbona	DeKalb
Shafter	Fayette
Sharon	Fayette
Shawnee	Gallatin
Shaws Point	Macoupin
Shelbyville	Shelby
Sheldon	Iroquois
Sheridan	Logan
Sherman	Mason
Shields	Lake
Shiloh	Edgar
Shiloh	Jefferson
Shiloh Valley	St. Clair
Shipman	Macoupin
Shirland	Winnebago
Shoal Creek	Bond
Sidell	Vermilion
Sidney	Champaign
Sigel	Shelby
Silver Creek	Stephenson
Six Mile	Franklin
Smallwood	Jasper
Smithton	St. Clair
Somer	Champaign
Somerset	Jackson
Somonauk	DeKalb
Songer	Clay
Sonora	Hancock
South Crouch	Hamilton
South Dixon	Lee
South Flannigan	Hamilton
South Fork	Christian
South Grove	DeKalb
South Homer	Champaign
South Hurricane	Fayette
South Litchfield	Montgomery
South Macon	Macon
South Moline	Rock Island
South Muddy	Jasper
South Ottawa	LaSalle
South Otter	Macoupin
South Palmyra	Macoupin
South Rock Island	Rock Island
South Ross	Vermilion
South Twigg	Hamilton
South Wheatland	Macon
Southwest	Crawford
Sparta	Knox
Spring Bay	Woodford
Spring Creek	Pike
Spring Garden	Jefferson
Spring Grove	Warren
Spring Lake	Tazewell
Spring Point	Cumberland
Spring	Boone
Springfield	Sangamon
Squaw Grove	DeKalb
St. Albans	Hancock
St. Anne	Kankakee
St. Charles	Kane
St. Clair	St. Clair
St. Francis	Effingham
St. Jacob	Madison
St. Joseph	Champaign
St. Mary	Hancock
Stanford	Clay
Stanton	Champaign
Staunton	Macoupin
Sterling	Whiteside
Steuben	Marshall
Stevenson	Marion
Stickney	Cook
Stites	St. Clair
Stockland	Iroquois
Stockton	Jo Daviess
Stone Fort	Saline
Stonington	Christian
Stookey	St. Clair
Stratton	Edgar
Stronghurst	Henderson
Sublette	Lee
Suez	Mercer
Sugar Creek	Clinton
Sugar Grove	Kane
Sugarloaf	St. Clair
Sullivan	Livingston
Sullivan	Moultrie
Sullivant	Ford
Summit	Effingham
Sumner	Kankakee
Sumner	Warren
Sumpter	Cumberland
Sunbury	Livingston
Swan	Warren
Sycamore	DeKalb
Symmes	Edgar
Talkington	Sangamon
Tamalco	Bond
Tampico	Whiteside
Tate	Saline
Taylor	Ogle
Taylorville	Christian
Tennessee	McDonough
Terre Haute	Henderson
Teutopolis	Effingham
Texas	DeWitt
Thompson	Jo Daviess
Thornton	Cook
Timber	Peoria
Todds Point	Shelby
Tolono	Champaign
Tompkins	Warren
Tonti	Marion
Toulon	Stark
Towanda	McLean
Tower Hill	Shelby
Tremont	Tazewell
Trivoli	Peoria
Troy Grove	LaSalle
Troy	Will
Truro	Knox
Tunbridge	DeWitt
Tuscola	Douglas
Twigg	Hamilton
Tyrone	Franklin
Union Grove	Whiteside
Union	Cumberland
Union	Effingham
Union	Fulton
Union	Livingston
Unity	Piatt
Urbana	Champaign
Ursa	Adams
Ustick	Whiteside
Utica	LaSalle
Valley	Stark
Vance	Vermilion
Vandalia	Fayette
Venedy	Washington
Venice	Madison
Vergennes	Jackson
Vermillion	LaSalle
Vermont	Fulton
Vernon	Lake
Versailles	Brown
Victor	DeKalb
Victoria	Knox
Vienna	Grundy
Vinegar Hill	Jo Daviess
Viola	Lee
Virden	Macoupin
Virgil	Kane
Virginia	Cass
Wabash	Clark
Waddams	Stephenson
Wade	Clinton
Wade	Jasper
Waldo	Livingston
Walker	Hancock
Walkerville	Greene
Wall	Ford
Wallace	LaSalle
Walnut Grove	Knox
Walnut Grove	McDonough
Walnut	Bureau
Walshville	Montgomery
Waltham	LaSalle
Wapella	DeWitt
Wards Grove	Jo Daviess
Warren	Jo Daviess
Warren	Lake
Warsaw	Hancock
Washington	Carroll
Washington	Tazewell
Washington	Will
Waterford	Fulton
Watson	Effingham
Wauconda	Lake
Waukegan	Lake
Wauponsee	Grundy
Wayne	DuPage
Waynesville	DeWitt
Webber	Jefferson
Weller	Henry
Wesley	Will
West Deerfield	Lake
West Galena	Jo Daviess
West Jersey	Stark
West Lincoln	Logan
West Point	Stephenson
West	Effingham
West	McLean
Western Mound	Macoupin
Western	Henry
Westfield	Bureau
Westfield	Clark
Wethersfield	Henry
Wheatfield	Clinton
Wheatland	Bureau
Wheatland	Fayette
Wheatland	Will
Wheeling	Cook
White Hall	Greene
White Oak	McLean
White Rock	Ogle
Whitefield	Marshall
Whitley	Moultrie
Whitmore	Macon
Wilberton	Fayette
Will	Will
Williams	Sangamon
Willow Branch	Piatt
Willow Creek	Lee
Willow Hill	Jasper
Wilmington	Will
Wilson	DeWitt
Wilton	Will
Windsor	Shelby
Winfield	DuPage
Winnebago	Winnebago
Winslow	Stephenson
Witt	Montgomery
Wood River	Madison
Woodbine	Jo Daviess
Woodbury	Cumberland
Woodland	Carroll
Woodland	Fulton
Woodside	Sangamon
Woodstock	Schuyler
Woodville	Greene
Woosung	Ogle
Worth	Cook
Worth	Woodford
Wrights	Greene
Wyanet	Bureau
Wyoming	Lee
Wysox	Carroll
Wythe	Hancock
Xenia	Clay
Yates	McLean
Yellowhead	Kankakee
York	Carroll
York	Clark
York	DuPage
Yorktown	Henry
Young America	Edgar
Young Hickory	Fulton
Zanesville	Montgomery
Zif	Wayne
Zion	Lake
Zuma	Rock Island

=== Coterminous townships ===
Several townships in Illinois are coterminous, each having boundaries identical to an incorporated municipality. Also called "townships within a city" or a "coterminous municipality," conterminous townships are governed by the state's Township Code, and granted additional privileges and powers. Those privileges and powers include the ability to combine township offices and city offices except that of township supervisor whose role then becomes supervisor of general assistance, the ability for the city council to exercise all of the powers of the township board, and the ability to unilaterally annex small portion of adjacent township territory.

Some townships are functionally coterminous, in which a city completely encompasses their boundaries, but also includes additional territory of adjacent townships. Examples of functionally coterminous municipalities include Granite City Township, Madison County; City of Peoria Township, Peoria County; and Capital Township, Sangamon County. These townships retain coterminous status as it relates to the function and structure of their local government - for instance, Capital Township's roads are maintained by the Springfield Department of Public Works as opposed to a township highway commission. However, unlike physically conterminous municipalities, functional coterminous municipalities can not unilaterally annex small portions of adjacent township territory, and must follow the regular annexation process laid out in the Illinois Municipal Code.

As of 2025, coterminous townships included:

- Alton Township, Madison County (Alton, Illinois)
- Berwyn Township, Cook County (Berwyn, Illinois)
- Bloomington City Township, McLean County (Bloomington, Illinois)
- Champaign City Township, Champaign County (Champaign, Illinois)
- Cicero Township, Cook County (Cicero, Illinois)
- Cunningham Township, Champaign County (Urbana, Illinois)
- East St. Louis Township, St. Clair County (East St. Louis, Illinois)
- Freeport Township, Stephenson County (Freeport, Illinois)
- Galesburg City Township, Knox County (Galesburg, Illinois)
- Macomb City Township, McDonough County (Macomb, Illinois)
- Oak Park Township, Cook County (Oak Park, Illinois)
- Quincy Township, Adams County (Quincy, Illinois)
- River Forest Township, Cook County (River Forest, Illinois)
- Warsaw Township, Hancock County (Warsaw, Illinois)
- Zion Township, Lake County (Zion, Illinois)

=== Former townships ===
- Belleville Township, St. Clair County — Dissolved at the end of May 2017, under a new Article 28 of the Township Code (60 ILCS 1/28-10), with the approval of ordinances by the township in January 2016 and its co-terminous municipality, the City of Belleville, in May 2016.
- Evanston Township, Cook County — formed as Ridgeville Township in 1850; boundaries changed and renamed Evanston Township in 1857; dissolved in May 2017 and functions transferred to the City of Evanston
- Godfrey Township, Madison County — created in 1875; dissolved in May 2019 and functions transferred to the village of Godfrey.
- Hyde Park Township, Cook County — created in 1861; annexed into Chicago in 1889
- Jefferson Township, Cook County — created in 1850; annexed into Chicago in 1889
- Lake Township, Cook County — created in 1850; annexed into Chicago in 1889
- Lake View Township, Cook County — formed from part of Ridgeville Township in 1857; annexed into Chicago in 1889
- Milam Township, Macon County — merged into neighboring Mount Zion Township, Macon County in 2009.
- North Chicago, South Chicago, and West Chicago Townships, Cook County, formed in the 1840s within Chicago, abolished 1902
- Ridgeville Township, Cook County — see Evanston Township in this list
- Rocky Run Township, Hancock County
- Salisbury Township, Sangamon County — In 1989, Salisbury Township was extinguished and its territory annexed to Fancy Creek and Gardner townships.
- South Fillmore Township, Montgomery County
- West Peoria Township, Peoria County In May 2021, the West Peoria Township was dissolved and the City of West Peoria assumed responsibilities for the portion within West Peoria.
- Wilcox Township, Hancock County

== See also ==
- List of census-designated places in Illinois
- List of municipalities in Illinois
- List of counties in Illinois
- List of precincts in Illinois
- List of unincorporated communities in Illinois
