= Clarksburg Township, Shelby County, Illinois =

Clarksburg Township
- Township
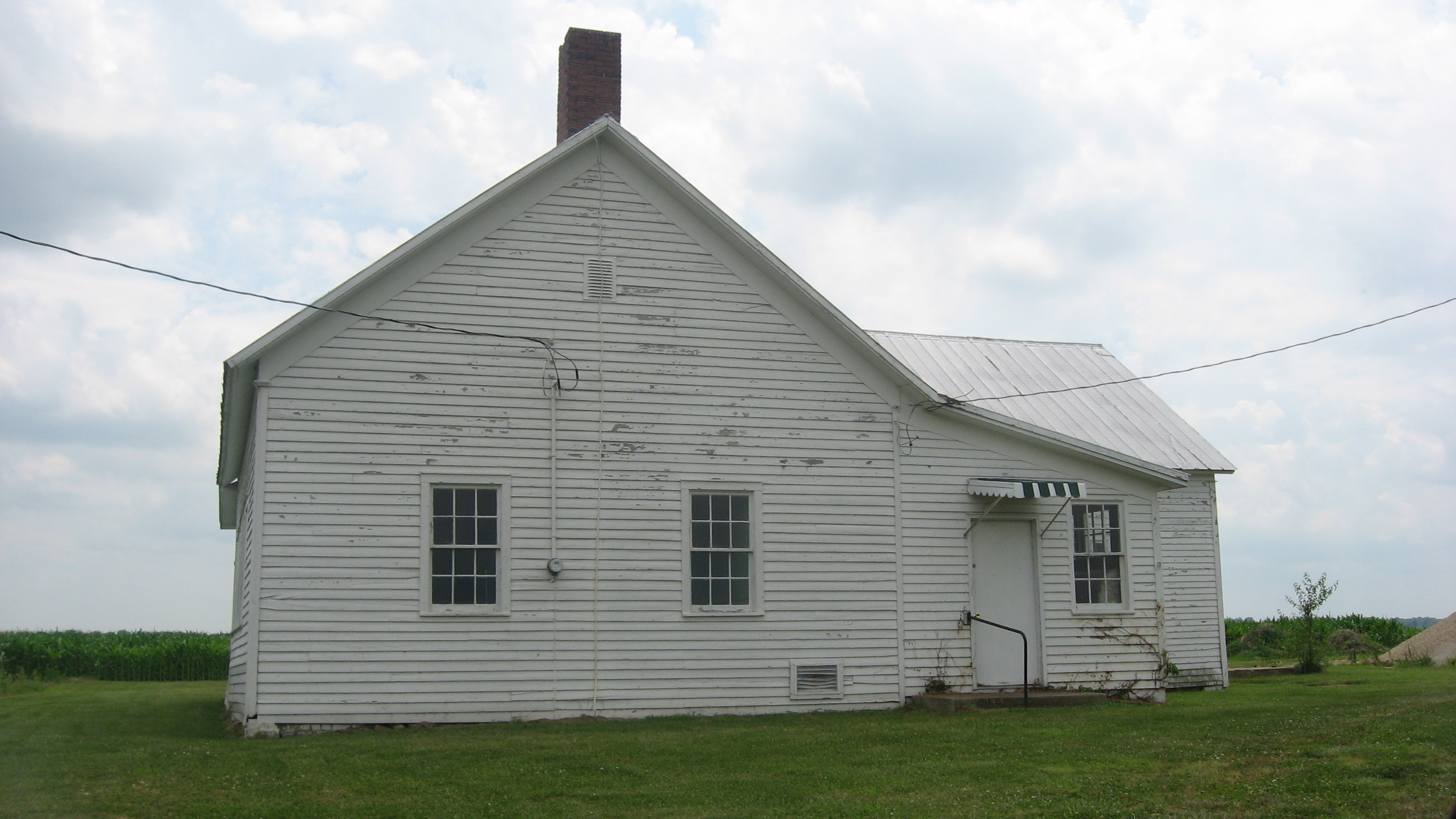
- Clarksburg Schoolhouse, west of Clarksburg

- Location of Illinois in the United States
- Coordinates: 39°18′57″N 88°45′11″W
- Country: United States
- State: Illinois
- County: Shelby
- Organized: September 19, 1918

Area
  - Total: 27.12 sq mi (70.2 km^{2})
  - Land: 27.12 sq mi (70.2 km^{2})
  - Water: 0 sq mi (0 km^{2})
- Elevation: 623 ft (190 m)

Population (2010)
  - Estimate (2016): 392
  - Density: 14.8/sq mi (5.7/km^{2})
- Time zone: UTC-6 (CST)
  - Summer (DST): UTC-5 (CDT)
- ZIP code: XXXXX
- Area code: 217
- FIPS code: 17-173-14637

Clarksburg Township is located in Shelby County, Illinois. As of the 2010 census, its population was 401 and it contained 177 housing units.

== Geography ==
According to the 2010 census, the township has a total area of 27.12 square miles (70.2 km^{2}), all land.

=== Adjacent townships ===
- Shelbyville Township (north)
- Richland Township (northeast)
- Prairie Township (east and southeast)
- Holland Township (south)
- Lakewood Township (west)
- Rose Township (northwest)

== Demographics ==
Historical population
Census	Pop.	Note	%±
2016 (est.)	392
U.S. Decennial Census
