= Flat Branch Township, Shelby County, Illinois =

Flat Branch Township
- Township

- Location of Illinois in the United States
- Coordinates: 39°33′59″N 88°58′25″W
- Country: United States
- State: Illinois
- County: Shelby
- Organized: November 8, 1859

Area
  - Total: 33.78 sq mi (87.5 km^{2})
  - Land: 33.78 sq mi (87.5 km^{2})
  - Water: 0.01 sq mi (0.026 km^{2})
- Elevation: 620 ft (190 m)

Population (2010)
  - Estimate (2016): 433
  - Density: 13.1/sq mi (5.1/km^{2})
- Time zone: UTC-6 (CST)
  - Summer (DST): UTC-5 (CDT)
- ZIP code: XXXXX
- Area code: 217
- FIPS code: 17-173-26337

Flat Branch Township is located in Shelby County in the U.S. state of Illinois. As of the 2010 census, its population was 443 and it contained 181 housing units.

== Geography ==
According to the 2010 census, the township has a total area of 33.78 square miles (87.5 km^{2}), of which 33.78 square miles (87.5 km^{2}) (or 100%) is land and 0.01 square miles (0.026 km^{2}) (or 0.03%) is water.

=== Adjacent townships ===
- Moweaqua Township (north)
- Penn Township (northeast)
- Pickaway Township (east)
- Ridge Township (southeast)
- Rural Township (south)
- Assumption Township, Christian County (southwest and west)
- Prairieton Township, Christian County (west and northwest)

== Demographics ==
Historical population
Census	Pop.	Note	%±
2016 (est.)	433
U.S. Decennial Census
