= Cold Spring Township, Shelby County, Illinois =

Cold Spring Township
- Township

- Location of Illinois in the United States
- Coordinates: 39°18′04″N 88°57′52″W
- Country: United States
- State: Illinois
- County: Shelby
- Organized: November 8, 1859

Area
  - Total: 34.97 sq mi (90.6 km^{2})
  - Land: 34.95 sq mi (90.5 km^{2})
  - Water: 0.01 sq mi (0.026 km^{2})
- Elevation: 650 ft (200 m)

Population (2010)
  - Estimate (2016): 432
  - Density: 12.6/sq mi (4.9/km^{2})
- Time zone: UTC-6 (CST)
  - Summer (DST): UTC-5 (CDT)
- ZIP code: XXXXX
- Area code: 217
- FIPS code: 17-173-15417

Cold Spring Township is located in Shelby County, Illinois. As of the 2010 census, its population was 442 and it contained 186 housing units.

== Geography ==
According to the 2010 census, the township has a total area of 34.97 square miles (90.6 km^{2}), of which 34.95 square miles (90.5 km^{2}) (or 99.94%) is land and 0.01 square miles (0.026 km^{2}) (or 0.03%) is water.

=== Adjacent townships ===
- Tower Hill Township (north)
- Rose Township (northeast)
- Lakewood Township (east)
- Dry Point Township (southeast)
- Herrick Township (south)
- Oconee Township (southwest and west)
- Pana Township, Christian County (northwest)

== Demographics ==
Historical population
Census	Pop.	Note	%±
2016 (est.)	432
U.S. Decennial Census
