= Ash Grove Township, Shelby County, Illinois =

Ash Grove Township
- Township

- Location of Illinois in the United States
- Coordinates: 39°23′41″N 88°31′48″W
- Country: United States
- State: Illinois
- County: Shelby
- Organized: November 8, 1859

Area
  - Total: 42.38 sq mi (109.8 km^{2})
  - Land: 42.11 sq mi (109.1 km^{2})
  - Water: 0.26 sq mi (0.67 km^{2})
- Elevation: 636 ft (194 m)

Population (2010)
  - Estimate (2016): 466
  - Density: 11.4/sq mi (4.4/km^{2})
- Time zone: UTC-6 (CST)
  - Summer (DST): UTC-5 (CDT)
- ZIP code: XXXXX
- Area code: 217
- FIPS code: 17-173-02466

Ash Grove Township is located in Shelby County, Illinois, USA. As of the 2010 census, its population was 479 and it contained 254 housing units.

== History ==
Ash Grove was initially settled by Euro-Americans by 1830. It was an early location of Mormon missionary activity in Illinois, with Mormons residing there by 1832. In late 1836 a mob attacked a Mormon missionary preaching at Ash Grove. Younger Green got an affidavit for the arrest of the mob, but the militia refused to cooperate in arresting the accused mobbers.

== Geography ==
According to the 2010 census, the township has a total area of 42.38 square miles (109.8 km^{2}), of which 42.11 square miles (109.1 km^{2}) (or 99.36%) is land and 0.26 square miles (0.67 km^{2}) (or 0.61%) is water.

=== Adjacent townships ===
- Whitley Township, Moultrie County (north)
- Mattoon Township, Coles County (northeast and east)
- Paradise Township, Coles County (east)
- Neoga Township, Cumberland County (east and southeast)
- Big Spring Township (south)
- Prairie Township (southwest)
- Richland Township (west)
- Windsor Township (northwest)

== Demographics ==
Historical population
Census	Pop.	Note	%±
2016 (est.)	466
U.S. Decennial Census
