= Dry Point Township, Shelby County, Illinois =

Dry Point Township
- Township

- Location of Illinois in the United States
- Coordinates: 39°14′43″N 88°51′40″W
- Country: United States
- State: Illinois
- County: Shelby
- Organized: November 8, 1859

Area
  - Total: 24.05 sq mi (62.3 km^{2})
  - Land: 24.05 sq mi (62.3 km^{2})
  - Water: 0 sq mi (0 km^{2})
- Elevation: 587 ft (179 m)

Population (2010)
  - Estimate (2016): 1,045
  - Density: 45.4/sq mi (17.5/km^{2})
- Time zone: UTC-6 (CST)
  - Summer (DST): UTC-5 (CDT)
- ZIP code: XXXXX
- Area code: 217
- FIPS code: 17-173-20851

Dry Point Township is located in Shelby County, Illinois. As of the 2010 census, its population was 1,093 and it contained 463 housing units.

== Geography ==
According to the 2010 census, the township has a total area of 24.05 square miles (62.3 km^{2}), all land.

=== Adjacent townships ===
- Lakewood Township (north)
- Holland Township (east)
- Liberty Township, Effingham County (southeast)
- Loudon Township, Fayette County (south)
- Bowling Green Township, Fayette County (south and southwest)
- Herrick Township (west)
- Cold Spring Township (northwest)

== Demographics ==
Historical population
| Census | Pop. | Note | %± |
|---|---|---|---|
| 2016 (est.) | 1,045 |
U.S. Decennial Census
