= Big Spring Township, Shelby County, Illinois =

Big Spring Township
- Township

- Location of Illinois in the United States
- Coordinates: 39°18′29″N 88°31′29″W
- Country: United States
- State: Illinois
- County: Shelby
- Organized: November 8, 1859

Area
  - Total: 29.67 sq mi (76.8 km^{2})
  - Land: 29.32 sq mi (75.9 km^{2})
  - Water: 0.35 sq mi (0.91 km^{2})
- Elevation: 640 ft (200 m)

Population (2010)
  - Estimate (2016): 686
  - Density: 23.8/sq mi (9.2/km^{2})
- Time zone: UTC-6 (CST)
  - Summer (DST): UTC-5 (CDT)
- ZIP code: XXXXX
- Area code: 217
- FIPS code: 17-173-06002

Big Spring Township is located in Shelby County, Illinois. As of the 2010 census, its population was 698 and it contained 326 housing units.

== Geography ==
According to the 2010 census, the township has a total area of 29.67 square miles (76.8 km^{2}), of which 29.32 square miles (75.9 km^{2}) (or 98.82%) is land and 0.35 square miles (0.91 km^{2}) (or 1.18%) is water.

=== Adjacent townships ===
- Ash Grove Township (north)
- Neoga Township, Cumberland County (northeast and east)
- Spring Point Township, Cumberland County (southeast)
- Sigel Township (south)
- Prairie Township (southwest and west)
- Richland Township (northwest)

== Demographics ==
Historical population
Census	Pop.	Note	%±
2016 (est.)	686
U.S. Decennial Census
