= Moweaqua Township, Shelby County, Illinois =

Moweaqua Township
- Township

- Location of Illinois in the United States
- Coordinates: 39°38′00″N 88°57′00″W
- Country: United States
- State: Illinois
- County: Shelby
- Organized: November 8, 1859

Area
  - Total: 16.88 sq mi (43.7 km^{2})
  - Land: 16.88 sq mi (43.7 km^{2})
  - Water: 0 sq mi (0 km^{2})
- Elevation: 692 ft (211 m)

Population (2010)
  - Estimate (2016): 1,904
  - Density: 118.6/sq mi (45.8/km^{2})
- Time zone: UTC-6 (CST)
  - Summer (DST): UTC-5 (CDT)
- ZIP code: XXXXX
- Area code: 217
- FIPS code: 17-173-51245

Moweaqua Township is located in Shelby County, Illinois. As of the 2010 census, its population was 2,003 and it contained 899 housing units.

== Geography ==
According to the 2010 census, the township has a total area of 16.88 square miles (43.7 km^{2}), all land.

=== Adjacent townships ===
- South Macon Township, Macon County (north)
- Milam Township, Macon County (northeast)
- Penn Township (east)
- Pickaway Township (southeast)
- Flat Branch Township (south)
- Assumption Township, Christian County (southwest)
- Prairieton Township, Christian County (west)
- Pleasant View Township, Macon County (northwest)

== Demographics ==
Historical population
Census	Pop.	Note	%±
2016 (est.)	1,904
U.S. Decennial Census
