= Cincinnati Township, Illinois =

Cincinnati Township, Illinois may refer to the following places:

- Cincinnati Township, Pike County, Illinois
- Cincinnati Township, Tazewell County, Illinois

See also

- Cincinnati Township (disambiguation)
