= Freeport Township =

Freeport Township may refer to the following townships in the United States:

- Freeport Township, Stephenson County, Illinois
- Freeport Township, Harrison County, Ohio
- Freeport Township, Greene County, Pennsylvania
