= Alton Township =

Alton Township may refer to:

- Alton Township, Madison County, Illinois
- Alton Township, Waseca County, Minnesota
