= Boody, Illinois =

- Census-designated place
- Location within Illinois Location within the United States
- Coordinates: 39°45′52″N 89°02′48″W
- Country: United States
- State: Illinois
- County: Macon
- Township: Blue Mound

Area
  - Total: 1.15 sq mi (2.98 km^{2})
  - Land: 1.15 sq mi (2.98 km^{2})
  - Water: 0 sq mi (0.00 km^{2})
- Elevation: 689 ft (210 m)

Population (2020)
  - Total: 232
  - Density: 201.6/sq mi (77.84/km^{2})
- Time zone: UTC-6 (Central (CST))
  - Summer (DST): UTC-5 (CDT)
- ZIP code: 62514
- Area code: 217
- GNIS feature ID: 2628544
- FIPS code: 17-07315

Boody is an unincorporated community and census-designated place (CDP) in Macon County, Illinois, United States. As of the 2020 census, Boody had a population of 232, down from 276 in 2010. Boody has a post office with ZIP code 62514.

The community was named after Col William H Boody.

== Geography ==
Boody is located in southwestern Macon County on Illinois Route 48, 8 miles (13 km) southwest of downtown Decatur, the county seat, and 20 miles (32 km) northeast of Taylorville.

According to the 2021 census gazetteer files, Boody has a total area of 1.15 square miles (2.98 km^{2}), all land. The community is drained to the southwest by tributaries of Spring Creek, a tributary of west-flowing Mosquito Creek and part of the Sangamon River watershed.

== Demographics ==
Historical population
Census	Pop.	Note	%±
2010	276		—
2020	232		−15.9%
U.S. Decennial Census

As of the 2020 census there were 232 people, 167 households, and 129 families residing in the CDP. The population density was 201.56 inhabitants per square mile (77.82/km^{2}). There were 119 housing units at an average density of 103.39 per square mile (39.92/km^{2}). The racial makeup of the CDP was 99.57% White, 0.00% African American, 0.00% Native American, 0.00% Asian, 0.00% Pacific Islander, 0.00% from other races, and 0.43% from two or more races. Hispanic or Latino of any race were 0.00% of the population.

There were 167 households, out of which 45.5% had children under the age of 18 living with them, 37.72% were married couples living together, 37.13% had a female householder with no husband present, and 22.75% were non-families. 22.75% of all households were made up of individuals, and 0.00% had someone living alone who was 65 years of age or older. The average household size was 3.00 and the average family size was 2.65.

The CDP's age distribution consisted of 33.7% under the age of 18, 5.4% from 18 to 24, 29% from 25 to 44, 22.8% from 45 to 64, and 9.0% who were 65 years of age or older. The median age was 34.4 years. For every 100 females, there were 100.0 males. For every 100 females age 18 and over, there were 61.9 males.

The median income for a household in the CDP was $51,417, and the median income for a family was $51,083. Males had a median income of $65,147 versus $40,532 for females. The per capita income for the CDP was $34,651. About 3.1% of families and 4.5% of the population were below the poverty line, including 0.0% of those under age 18 and 0.0% of those age 65 or over.

== Education ==
It is a part of the Meridian Community Unit School District 15.

The district's comprehensive high school is Meridian High School.

== Notable people ==
- Lauren Doyle, rugby sevens player who competed for the United States at the 2016 Summer Olympics
