= Oconee Township =

Oconee Township may refer to one of the following places in the United States:

- Oconee Township, Shelby County, Illinois
- Oconee Township, Platte County, Nebraska
