= Pleasant View Township, Macon County, Illinois =

Coordinates: 39°42′N 89°5′W

Pleasant View Township
- Township
- Location in Macon County

- Macon County's location in Illinois
- Country: United States
- State: Illinois
- County: Macon
- Settlement: Unknown

Area
  - Total: 30.59 sq mi (79.2 km^{2})
  - Land: 30.59 sq mi (79.2 km^{2})
  - Water: 0 sq mi (0 km^{2}) 0%

Population (2020)
  - Total: 1,411
  - Density: 46.13/sq mi (17.81/km^{2})
- Time zone: UTC-6 (CST)
  - Summer (DST): UTC-5 (CDT)
- FIPS code: 17-115-60677

Pleasant View Township is located in Macon County, Illinois, United States. As of the 2020 census, its population was 1,411 and it contained 612 housing units.

== Cities and towns ==
- Blue Mound

== Adjacent townships ==
- Blue Mound Township (north)
- South Macon Township (northeast and east)
- Moweaqua Township, Shelby County (southeast)
- Prairieton Township, Christian County (south)
- Stonington Township, Christian County (southwest and west)
- Mosquito Township, Christian County (west and northwest)

== Geography ==
According to the 2021 census gazetteer files, Pleasant View Township has a total area of 30.59 square miles (79.23 km^{2}), all land.

== Demographics ==
As of the 2020 census there were 1,411 people, 551 households, and 339 families residing in the township. The population density was 46.13 inhabitants per square mile (17.81/km^{2}). There were 612 housing units at an average density of 20.01 per square mile (7.73/km^{2}). The racial makeup of the township was 93.05% White, 0.78% African American, 0.57% Native American, 0.00% Asian, 0.07% Pacific Islander, 0.71% from other races, and 4.82% from two or more races. Hispanic or Latino of any race were 1.98% of the population.

There were 551 households, out of which 32.80% had children under the age of 18 living with them, 50.45% were married couples living together, 7.44% had a female householder with no spouse present, and 38.48% were non-families. 35.60% of all households were made up of individuals, and 19.10% had someone living alone who was 65 years of age or older. The average household size was 2.59 and the average family size was 3.42.

According to the 2020 American Community Survey, township's age distribution consisted of 29.2% under the age of 18, 7.5% from 18 to 24, 25.2% from 25 to 44, 20.4% from 45 to 64, and 17.7% who were 65 years of age or older. The median age was 35.2 years. For every 100 females, there were 96.5 males. For every 100 females age 18 and over, there were 99.8 males.

The median income for a household in the township was $57,969, and the median income for a family was $74,792. Males had a median income of $55,625 versus $26,816 for females. The per capita income for the township was $27,588. About 7.4% of families and 11.0% of the population were below the poverty line, including 16.2% of those under age 18 and 2.0% of those age 65 or over.

Historical population
Census	Pop.	Note	%±
2000	1,428		—
2010	1,481		3.7%
2020	1,411		−4.7%
U.S. Decennial Census
