= Prairieton Township =

Prairieton Township may refer to the following townships in the United States:

- Prairieton Township, Christian County, Illinois
- Prairieton Township, Vigo County, Indiana
