= Pickaway Township =

Pickaway Township may refer to the following townships in the United States:

- Pickaway Township, Pickaway County, Ohio
- Pickaway Township, Shelby County, Illinois
