= Lakewood, Shelby County, Illinois =

Lakewood, Illinois
- Census Designated Place
- Location within Illinois Location within the United States
- Coordinates: 39°19′25″N 88°53′53″W
- Country: United States
- State: Illinois
- County: Shelby
- Elevation: 620 ft (190 m)
- Time zone: UTC-6 (Central (CST))
  - Summer (DST): UTC-5 (CDT)
- ZIP code: 62438
- Area code: 217
- GNIS feature ID: 2806516

Lakewood is an unincorporated community and census designated place (CDP) in Lakewood Township, Shelby County, Illinois, United States. Lakewood is located on County Highway 12, 8 miles (13 km) southwest of Shelbyville. Lakewood had a post office, which opened on July 26, 1872, and closed on November 2, 2002.

== Demographics ==
Lakewood first appeared as a census designated place in the 2020 U.S. census.
