= South Macon Township, Macon County, Illinois =

Coordinates: 39°42′N 88°58′W

South Macon Township
- Township
- Location in Macon County

- Macon County's location in Illinois
- Country: United States
- State: Illinois
- County: Macon
- Settlement: November 8, 1859

Area
  - Total: 33.78 sq mi (87.5 km^{2})
  - Land: 33.78 sq mi (87.5 km^{2})
  - Water: 0 sq mi (0 km^{2}) 0%

Population (2020)
  - Total: 1,468
  - Density: 43.2/sq mi (16.7/km^{2})
- Time zone: UTC-6 (CST)
  - Summer (DST): UTC-5 (CDT)
- FIPS code: 17-115-70967

South Macon Township is located in Macon County, Illinois. As of the 2020 census, its population was at 1,468 and it contained 648 housing units. The city of Macon, Illinois is located in the South Macon Township.

== Cities and towns ==
- Macon
- Walker

== Adjacent townships ==
- South Wheatland Township (north)
- Mount Zion Township (northeast and east)
- Milam Township (east)
- Penn Township, Shelby County (southeast)
- Moweaqua Township, Shelby County (south)
- Prairieton Township, Christian County (southwest)
- Pleasant View Township (west)
- Blue Mound Township (northwest)

== Geography ==
According to the 2021 census gazetteer files, South Macon Township has a total area of 33.78 square miles (87.49 km^{2}), all land.

== Demographics ==
South Macon Township historical population
Census	Pop.	Note	%±
2000	1,545		—
2010	1,457		−5.7%
2020	1,468		0.8%

As of the 2020 census there were 1,468 people, 523 households, and 379 families residing in the township. The population density was 43.46 inhabitants per square mile (16.78/km^{2}). There were 648 housing units at an average density of 19.19 per square mile (7.41/km^{2}). The racial makeup of the township was 96.25% White, 0.54% African American, 0.07% Native American, 0.00% Asian, 0.00% Pacific Islander, 0.41% from other races, and 2.72% from two or more races. Hispanic or Latino of any race were 1.36% of the population.

There were 523 households, out of which 29.30% had children under the age of 18 living with them, 61.95% were married couples living together, 7.46% had a female householder with no spouse present, and 27.53% were non-families. 23.90% of all households were made up of individuals, and 7.80% had someone living alone who was 65 years of age or older. The average household size was 2.43 and the average family size was 2.85.

According to the 2020 American Community Survey, township's age distribution consisted of 21.3% under the age of 18, 7.2% from 18 to 24, 22.1% from 25 to 44, 29.2% from 45 to 64, and 20.2% who were 65 years of age or older. The median age was 44.6 years. For every 100 females, there were 94.2 males. For every 100 females age 18 and over, there were 98.8 males.

The median income for a household in the township was $66,917, and the median income for a family was $78,482. Males had a median income of $52,857 versus $28,621 for females. The per capita income for the township was $32,064. About 1.8% of families and 3.5% of the population were below the poverty line, including 1.5% of those under age 18 and 4.9% of those age 65 or over.
