= Blackland, Illinois =

- Unincorporated community
- Location within Illinois Location within the United States
- Coordinates: 39°45′41″N 89°06′14″W
- Country: United States
- State: Illinois
- County: Macon
- Elevation: 617 ft (188 m)
- Time zone: UTC-6 (Central (CST))
  - Summer (DST): UTC-5 (CDT)
- Area code: 217
- GNIS feature ID: 422471

Blackland is an unincorporated community in Blue Mound Township, Macon County, Illinois, United States. The community is on County Route 27 4.3 miles (6.9 km) north-northeast of Blue Mound.
