= Mode, Illinois =

- Unincorporated community
- Location within Illinois Location within the United States
- Coordinates: 39°15′59″N 88°44′01″W
- Country: United States
- State: Illinois
- County: Shelby
- Elevation: 627 ft (191 m)
- Time zone: UTC-6 (Central (CST))
  - Summer (DST): UTC-5 (CDT)
- ZIP code: 62444
- Area code: 217
- GNIS feature ID: 413695

Mode is an unincorporated community in Holland Township, Shelby County, Illinois, United States. Mode is 5.5 miles (8.9 km) west of Stewardson and has a post office with ZIP code 62444. Mode is also the home of the Holland Township Building at RR 1 Box 171A, Mode, Illinois 62444.
