= Granite City Township, Madison County, Illinois =

Granite City Township
- Township

- Location of Illinois in the United States
- Coordinates: 38°42′52″N 90°07′47″W
- Country: United States
- State: Illinois
- County: Madison
- Settled: After 1921

Area
  - Total: 11.42 sq mi (29.6 km^{2})
  - Land: 10.61 sq mi (27.5 km^{2})
  - Water: 0.82 sq mi (2.1 km^{2})
- Elevation: 420 ft (130 m)

Population (2010)
  - Estimate (2016): 26,325
  - Density: 2,563.7/sq mi (989.9/km^{2})
- Time zone: UTC-6 (CST)
  - Summer (DST): UTC-5 (CDT)
- FIPS code: 17-119-30939
- Website: granitecitytownship.com

Granite City Township is located in Madison County, Illinois, in the United States. Granite City Township was founded in 1896, close to the Mississippi River. It quickly became an industrialized city due to its access to the Mississippi River and railroads. Granite City's population has long relied on its steel mill (Granite City Steel) as a source of income. As of the 2020 census, its population was 27,549.

== Geography ==
According to the 2010 census, the township has a total area of 11.42 square miles (29.6 km^{2}), of which 10.61 square miles (27.5 km^{2}) (or 92.91%) is land and 0.82 square miles (2.1 km^{2}) (or 7.18%) is water.

== Demographics ==
According to the U.S. Census Bureau, in 2020 Granite City's population is made up of 83.6% of White Non Hispanics people, 11.9% African American people, and 8.3% Hispanic or Latino people.

Historical population
Census	Pop.	Note	%±
2016 (est.)	26,325
U.S. Decennial Census
