= Okaw Township, Shelby County, Illinois =

Okaw Township
- Township

- Location of Illinois in the United States
- Coordinates: 39°28′13″N 88°45′03″W
- Country: United States
- State: Illinois
- County: Shelby
- Organized: November 8, 1859

Area
  - Total: 35.56 sq mi (92.1 km^{2})
  - Land: 30.94 sq mi (80.1 km^{2})
  - Water: 4.63 sq mi (12.0 km^{2})
- Elevation: 686 ft (209 m)

Population (2010)
  - Estimate (2016): 897
  - Density: 30/sq mi (12/km^{2})
- Time zone: UTC-6 (CST)
  - Summer (DST): UTC-5 (CDT)
- ZIP code: XXXXX
- Area code: 217
- FIPS code: 17-173-55457

Okaw Township is located in Shelby County, Illinois. As of the 2010 census, its population was 927 and it contained 498 housing units.

== Geography ==
According to the 2010 census, the township has a total area of 35.56 square miles (92.1 km^{2}), of which 30.94 square miles (80.1 km^{2}) (or 87.01%) is land and 4.63 square miles (12.0 km^{2}) (or 13.02%) is water.

== Demographics ==
Historical population
Census	Pop.	Note	%±
2016 (est.)	897
U.S. Decennial Census
