= Todds Point Township, Shelby County, Illinois =

Todds Point Township
- Township

- Location of Illinois in the United States
- Coordinates: 39°32′36″N 88°45′34″W
- Country: United States
- State: Illinois
- County: Shelby
- Organized: Unknown

Area
  - Total: 19.59 sq mi (50.7 km^{2})
  - Land: 19.04 sq mi (49.3 km^{2})
  - Water: 0.55 sq mi (1.4 km^{2})
- Elevation: 673 ft (205 m)

Population (2010)
  - Estimate (2016): 425
  - Density: 23.2/sq mi (9.0/km^{2})
- Time zone: UTC-6 (CST)
  - Summer (DST): UTC-5 (CDT)
- ZIP code: XXXXX
- Area code: 217
- FIPS code: 17-173-75588

Todds Point Township is located in Shelby County, Illinois. As of the 2010 census, its population was 441 and it contained 208 housing units.

== Geography ==
According to the 2010 census, the township has a total area of 19.59 square miles (50.7 km^{2}), of which 19.04 square miles (49.3 km^{2}) (or 97.19%) is land and 0.55 square miles (1.4 km^{2}) (or 2.81%) is water.

== Demographics ==
Historical population
Census	Pop.	Note	%±
2016 (est.)	425
U.S. Decennial Census
