= Westervelt, Illinois =

- Census-designated place
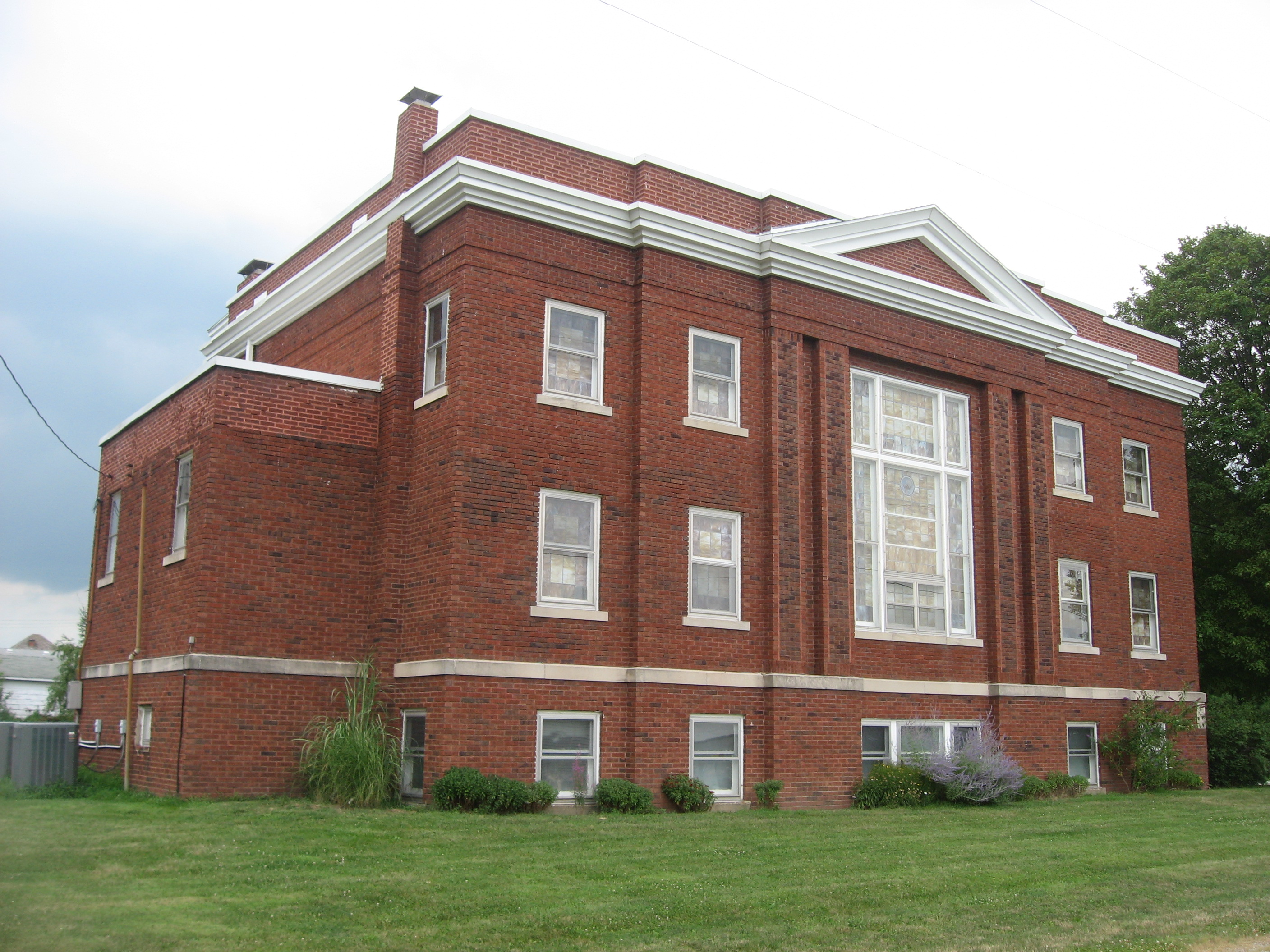
- Westervelt Christian Church

- Location within Illinois
- Coordinates: 39°28′45″N 88°51′40″W
- Country: United States
- State: Illinois
- County: Shelby
- Township: Ridge

Area
  - Total: 0.085 sq mi (0.22 km^{2})
  - Land: 0.085 sq mi (0.22 km^{2})
  - Water: 0 sq mi (0.00 km^{2})
- Elevation: 650 ft (200 m)

Population (2020)
  - Total: 131
  - Density: 1,530.8/sq mi (591.04/km^{2})
- Time zone: UTC-6 (Central (CST))
  - Summer (DST): UTC-5 (CDT)
- ZIP Code: 62565
- Area code: 217
- GNIS feature ID: 2628563

Westervelt is a census-designated place in Shelby County, Illinois, United States. Its population was 131 as of the 2020 census.

== History ==
Westervelt was established in 1904 as a station along the Chicago and Eastern Illinois Railroad, which had recently opened a line through the area. The station drew settlers and businesses from the nearby community of Brunswick, and the new community grew quickly. A 1917 tornado killed six residents and destroyed nine buildings.

The Westervelt Christian Church is listed on the National Register of Historic Places.

== Demographics ==
Historical population
Census	Pop.	Note	%±
2000	130		—
2010	128		−1.5%
2020	131		2.3%
U.S. Decennial Census
