= Cincinnati Township =

Cincinnati Township may refer to:

== Illinois ==
- Cincinnati Township, Pike County, Illinois
- Cincinnati Township, Tazewell County, Illinois

== Iowa ==
- Cincinnati Township, Harrison County, Iowa

== Ohio ==
- Cincinnati Township, Hamilton County, Ohio (defunct)
