= Mount Zion Township, Macon County, Illinois =

Coordinates: 39°44′N 88°52′W

Mount Zion Township
- Township
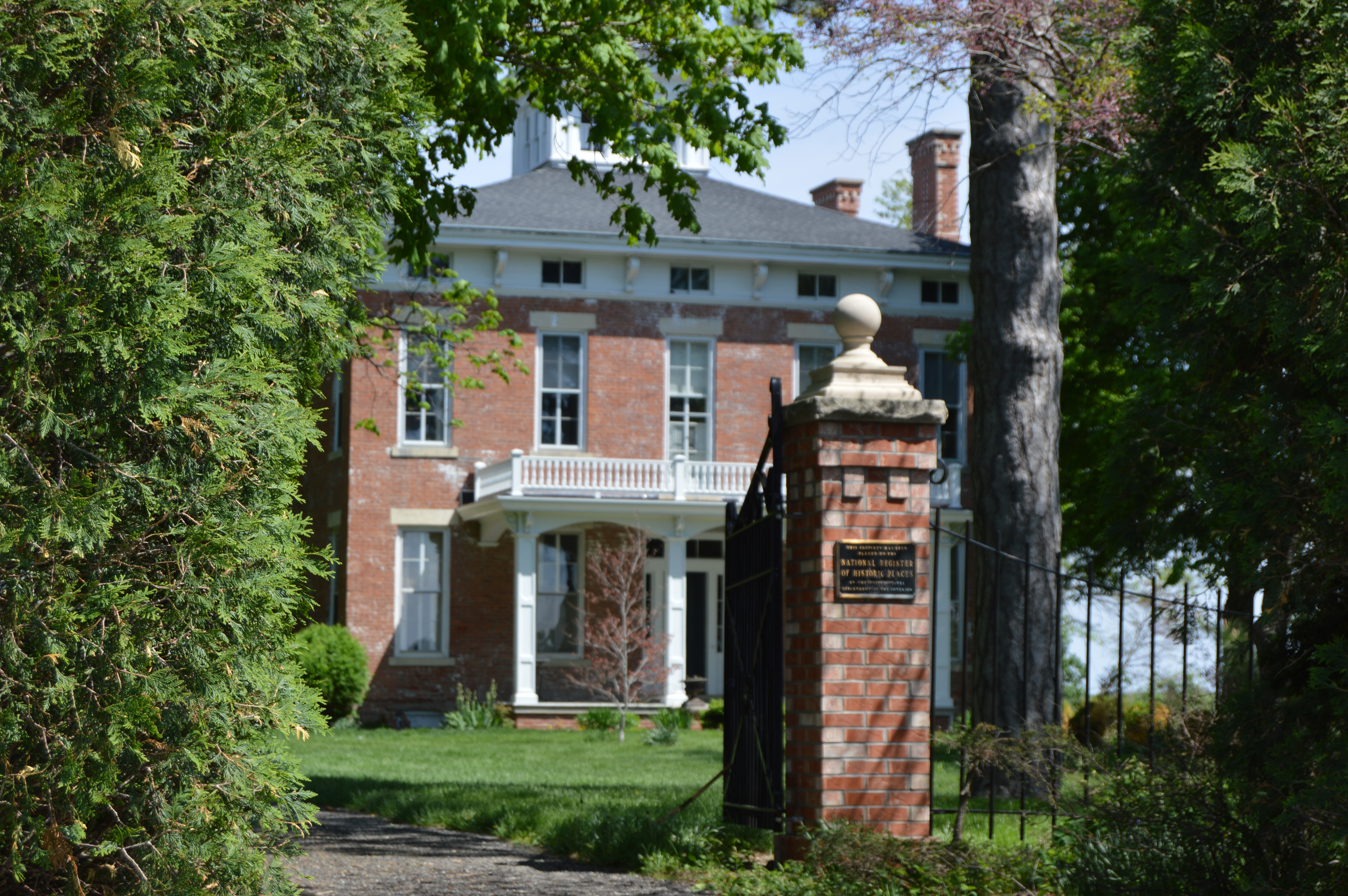
- The Eli Ulery House, a historic site in the township

- Location in Macon County

- Macon County's location in Illinois
- Country: United States
- State: Illinois
- County: Macon
- Settlement: November 8, 1859

Area
  - Total: 66.59 sq mi (172.5 km^{2})
  - Land: 66.58 sq mi (172.4 km^{2})
  - Water: 0.02 sq mi (0.052 km^{2}) 0.02%

Population (2010)
  - Total: 7,213
  - Density: 108.3/sq mi (41.83/km^{2})
- Time zone: UTC-6 (CST)
  - Summer (DST): UTC-5 (CDT)
- FIPS code: 17-115-51219

Mount Zion Township is located in Macon County, Illinois. As of the 2020 census, its population was 7,213 and it contained 3,045 housing units. In 2009, Milam Township to the south was merged into Mount Zion Township.

== Cities and towns ==
- Hervey City
- Mount Zion
- Turpin

== Adjacent townships ==
- Long Creek Township (north)
- Dora Township, Moultrie County (east and southeast)
- Penn Township, Shelby County (south)
- South Macon Township (southwest and west)
- South Wheatland Township (west and northwest)

== Geography ==
According to the 2021 census gazetteer files, Mount Zion Township has a total area of 66.59 square miles (172.47 km^{2}), of which 66.58 square miles (172.44 km^{2}) (or 99.98%) is land and 0.02 square miles (0.05 km^{2}) (or 0.02%) is water.

== Demographics ==
As of the 2020 census there were 7,213 people, 2,665 households, and 2,085 families residing in the township. The population density was 108.32 inhabitants per square mile (41.82/km^{2}). There were 3,045 housing units at an average density of 45.73 per square mile (17.66/km^{2}). The racial makeup of the township was 92.82% White, 0.93% African American, 0.14% Native American, 1.15% Asian, 0.03% Pacific Islander, 0.65% from other races, and 4.28% from two or more races. Hispanic or Latino of any race were 1.55% of the population.

There were 2,665 households, out of which 32.80% had children under the age of 18 living with them, 67.20% were married couples living together, 5.93% had a female householder with no spouse present, and 21.76% were non-families. 18.60% of all households were made up of individuals, and 8.40% had someone living alone who was 65 years of age or older. The average household size was 2.61 and the average family size was 2.98.

According to the 2020 American Community Survey, township's age distribution consisted of 26.9% under the age of 18, 5.7% from 18 to 24, 24.1% from 25 to 44, 24% from 45 to 64, and 19.1% who were 65 years of age or older. The median age was 41.6 years. For every 100 females, there were 96.1 males. For every 100 females age 18 and over, there were 91.9 males.

The median income for a household in the township was $77,527, and the median income for a family was $88,729. Males had a median income of $53,100 versus $34,497 for females. The per capita income for the township was $37,945. About 3.2% of families and 6.3% of the population were below the poverty line, including 12.3% of those under age 18 and 2.7% of those age 65 or over.

Historical population
Census	Pop.	Note	%±
2000	6,324		—
2010	7,131		12.8%
2020	7,213		1.1%
U.S. Decennial Census
