= Milam Township, Macon County, Illinois =

Coordinates: 39°41′N 88°52′W

Milam Township
- Township
- Location in Macon County

- Macon County's location in Illinois
- Country: United States
- State: Illinois
- County: Macon
- Settlement: Unknown

Area
  - Total: 23.80 sq mi (61.64 km^{2})
  - Land: 23.80 sq mi (61.64 km^{2})
  - Water: 0 sq mi (0.0 km^{2}) 0.0%

Population (2000)
  - Total: 95
- Time zone: UTC-6 (CST)
  - Summer (DST): UTC-5 (CDT)

Milam Township was a civil township in Macon County, Illinois. The population was 95 at the 2000 census. In 2009, it was merged into Mount Zion Township.

== Adjacent townships ==
- Mount Zion Township (north)
- Dora Township, Moultrie County (northeast and east)
- Marrowbone Township, Moultrie County (east and southeast)
- Penn Township, Shelby County (south)
- Moweaqua Township, Shelby County (southwest)
- South Macon Township (west and northwest)
