= Herrick, Illinois =

Herrick
- Village
- Location of Herrick in Shelby County, Illinois.
- Coordinates: 39°13′11″N 88°59′05″W
- Country: United States
- State: Illinois
- County: Shelby

Area
  - Total: 0.37 sq mi (0.95 km^{2})
  - Land: 0.37 sq mi (0.95 km^{2})
  - Water: 0 sq mi (0.00 km^{2})
- Elevation: 600 ft (180 m)

Population (2020)
  - Total: 358
  - Density: 978.1/sq mi (377.66/km^{2})
- Time zone: UTC-6 (CST)
  - Summer (DST): UTC-5 (CDT)
- ZIP code: 62431
- Area code: 618
- FIPS code: 17-34332
- GNIS ID: 2398493

Herrick is a village in Shelby County, Illinois, United States. As of the 2020 census, Herrick had a population of 358.

According to the 2010 census, Herrick has a total area of 0.37 square miles (0.96 km^{2}), all land.

== Demographics ==
Historical population
| Census | Pop. | Note | %± |
|---|---|---|---|
| 1900 | 421 | | — |
| 1910 | 618 | | 46.8% |
| 1920 | 601 | | −2.8% |
| 1930 | 474 | | −21.1% |
| 1940 | 616 | | 30.0% |
| 1950 | 554 | | −10.1% |
| 1960 | 440 | | −20.6% |
| 1970 | 537 | | 22.0% |
| 1980 | 470 | | −12.5% |
| 1990 | 466 | | −0.9% |
| 2000 | 524 | | 12.4% |
| 2010 | 436 | | −16.8% |
| 2020 | 358 | | −17.9% |
U.S. Decennial Census

As of the census of 2000, there were 524 people, 197 households, and 136 families residing in the village. The population density was 1,442.8 inhabitants per square mile (557.1/km^{2}). There were 221 housing units at an average density of 608.5 per square mile (234.9/km^{2}). The racial makeup of the village was 99.62% White, 0.19% from other races, and 0.19% from two or more races. Hispanic or Latino of any race were 0.38% of the population.

There were 197 households, out of which 36.0% had children under the age of 18 living with them, 55.3% were married couples living together, 8.6% had a female householder with no husband present, and 30.5% were non-families. 25.4% of all households were made up of individuals, and 15.7% had someone living alone who was 65 years of age or older. The average household size was 2.66 and the average family size was 3.24.

In the village, the population was spread out, with 30.7% under the age of 18, 8.2% from 18 to 24, 25.2% from 25 to 44, 18.1% from 45 to 64, and 17.7% who were 65 years of age or older. The median age was 34 years. For every 100 females, there were 103.9 males. For every 100 females age 18 and over, there were 100.6 males.

The median income for a household in the village was $24,722, and the median income for a family was $30,000. Males had a median income of $30,227 versus $20,000 for females. The per capita income for the village was $11,243. About 18.1% of families and 22.0% of the population were below the poverty line, including 32.2% of those under age 18 and 9.1% of those age 65 or over.
