= Sigel Township, Shelby County, Illinois =

Sigel Township
- Township

- Location of Illinois in the United States
- Coordinates: 39°15′05″N 88°31′28″W
- Country: United States
- State: Illinois
- County: Shelby
- Organized: Unknown

Area
  - Total: 23.83 sq mi (61.7 km^{2})
  - Land: 23.82 sq mi (61.7 km^{2})
  - Water: 0.01 sq mi (0.026 km^{2})
- Elevation: 630 ft (190 m)

Population (2010)
  - Estimate (2016): 805
  - Density: 34.7/sq mi (13.4/km^{2})
- Time zone: UTC-6 (CST)
  - Summer (DST): UTC-5 (CDT)
- ZIP code: 62462
- Area code: 217
- FIPS code: 17-173-69927

== Geography ==
According to the 2010 census, the township has a total area of 23.83 square miles (61.7 km^{2}), of which 23.82 square miles (61.7 km^{2}) (or 99.96%) is land and 0.01 square miles (0.026 km^{2}) (or 0.04%) is water.

== Demographics ==
Historical population
Census	Pop.	Note	%±
2016 (est.)	805
U.S. Decennial Census
