= Quincy Township, Adams County, Illinois =

Township in Illinois, United States

Quincy Township is one of the twenty-three townships in Adams County, Illinois. The township was established in 1850. Quincy Township is a legally distinct entity from the City of Quincy and it is one of fifteen coterminous townships in the State of Illinois. The incumbent township supervisor is Maggie Hoyt.
