= Tower Hill Township, Shelby County, Illinois =

Tower Hill Township
- Township

- Location of Illinois in the United States
- Coordinates: 39°23′24″N 88°58′07″W
- Country: United States
- State: Illinois
- County: Shelby
- Organized: November 8, 1859

Area
  - Total: 35.03 sq mi (90.7 km^{2})
  - Land: 34.83 sq mi (90.2 km^{2})
  - Water: 0.2 sq mi (0.52 km^{2})
- Elevation: 653 ft (199 m)

Population (2010)
  - Estimate (2016): 1,183
  - Density: 35.2/sq mi (13.6/km^{2})
- Time zone: UTC-6 (CST)
  - Summer (DST): UTC-5 (CDT)
- ZIP code: XXXXX
- Area code: 217
- FIPS code: 17-173-75861

Tower Hill Township is a township in Shelby County, Illinois. As of the 2010 census, its population was 1,227 and it contained 729 housing units.

== Geography ==
According to the 2010 census, the township has a total area of 35.03 square miles (90.7 km^{2}), of which 34.83 square miles (90.2 km^{2}) (or 99.43%) is land and 0.2 square miles (0.52 km^{2}) (or 0.57%) is water.

== Demographics ==
Historical population
Census	Pop.	Note	%±
2016 (est.)	1,183
U.S. Decennial Census
