= Windsor Township, Shelby County, Illinois =

Windsor Township
- Township

- Location of Illinois in the United States
- Coordinates: 39°28′18″N 88°39′09″W
- Country: United States
- State: Illinois
- County: Shelby
- Organized: November 8, 1859

Area
  - Total: 30.2 sq mi (78 km^{2})
  - Land: 28.65 sq mi (74.2 km^{2})
  - Water: 1.56 sq mi (4.0 km^{2})
- Elevation: 656 ft (200 m)

Population (2010)
  - Estimate (2016): 1,433
  - Density: 51.5/sq mi (19.9/km^{2})
- Time zone: UTC-6 (CST)
  - Summer (DST): UTC-5 (CDT)
- ZIP code: XXXXX
- Area code: 217
- FIPS code: 17-173-82335

Windsor Township is located in Shelby County, Illinois. As of the 2010 census, its population was 1,474 and it contained 675 housing units.

== Geography ==
According to the 2010 census, the township has a total area of 30.2 square miles (78 km^{2}), of which 28.65 square miles (74.2 km^{2}) (or 94.87%) is land and 1.56 square miles (4.0 km^{2}) (or 5.17%) is water.

== Demographics ==
Historical population
Census	Pop.	Note	%±
2016 (est.)	1,433
U.S. Decennial Census
