= Blue Mound Township, Macon County, Illinois =

Coordinates: 39°46′N 89°5′W

Blue Mound Township
- Township
- Location in Macon County

- Macon County's location in Illinois
- Country: United States
- State: Illinois
- County: Macon
- Settlement: November 8, 1859

Area
  - Total: 32.62 sq mi (84.5 km^{2})
  - Land: 32.57 sq mi (84.4 km^{2})
  - Water: 0.04 sq mi (0.10 km^{2}) 0.13%

Population (2020)
  - Total: 822
  - Density: 25.2/sq mi (9.74/km^{2})
- Time zone: UTC-6 (CST)
  - Summer (DST): UTC-5 (CDT)
- FIPS code: 17-115-06769

Blue Mound Township is located in Macon County, Illinois. As of the 2020 census, the population was 822 at it contained 382 housing units.

== Cities and towns ==
- Blackland
- Boody

== Adjacent townships ==
- Harristown Township (north)
- Decatur Township (northeast)
- South Wheatland Township (east)
- South Macon Township (southeast)
- Pleasant View Township (south)
- Mosquito Township, Christian County (southwest and west)
- Niantic Township (northwest)

== Geography ==
According to the 2021 census gazetteer files, Blue Mound Township has a total area of 32.62 square miles (84.49 km^{2}), of which 32.57 square miles (84.36 km^{2}) (or 99.87%) is land and 0.04 square miles (0.10 km^{2}) (or 0.13%) is water.

== Demographics ==
As of the 2020 census there were 822 people, 393 households, and 313 families residing in the township. The population density was 25.20 inhabitants per square mile (9.73/km^{2}). There were 368 housing units at an average density of 11.28 per square mile (4.36/km^{2}). The racial makeup of the township was 96.84% White, 0.12% African American, 0.24% Native American, 0.00% Asian, 0.00% Pacific Islander, 0.49% from other races, and 2.31% from two or more races. Hispanic or Latino of any race were 1.46% of the population.

There were 393 households, out of which 37.20% had children under the age of 18 living with them, 58.52% were married couples living together, 15.78% had a female householder with no spouse present, and 20.36% were non-families. 17.80% of all households were made up of individuals, and 4.10% had someone living alone who was 65 years of age or older. The average household size was 2.47 and the average family size was 2.71.

According to the 2020 American Community Survey, township's age distribution consisted of 25.2% under the age of 18, 2.5% from 18 to 24, 20% from 25 to 44, 38.1% from 45 to 64, and 14.2% who were 65 years of age or older. The median age was 45.6 years. For every 100 females, there were 99 males. For every 100 females age 18 and over, there were 103.4 males.

The median income for a household in the township was $67,452, and the median income for a family was $81,806. Males had a median income of $52,500 versus $40,810 for females. The per capita income for the township was $43,905. About 1.3% of families and 4.6% of the population were below the poverty line, including 2.1% of those under age 18 and 0.0% of those age 65 or over.

Historical population
Census	Pop.	Note	%±
2000	917		—
2010	890		−2.9%
2020	822		−7.6%
