= Rural Township, Shelby County, Illinois =

Rural Township
- Township

- Location of Illinois in the United States
- Coordinates: 39°28′45″N 88°58′13″W
- Country: United States
- State: Illinois
- County: Shelby
- Organized: November 8, 1859

Area
  - Total: 34.62 sq mi (89.7 km^{2})
  - Land: 34.61 sq mi (89.6 km^{2})
  - Water: 0.01 sq mi (0.026 km^{2})
- Elevation: 640 ft (200 m)

Population (2010)
  - Estimate (2016): 333
  - Density: 9.8/sq mi (3.8/km^{2})
- Time zone: UTC-6 (CST)
  - Summer (DST): UTC-5 (CDT)
- ZIP code: XXXXX
- Area code: 217
- FIPS code: 17-173-66313

Rural Township is located in Shelby County, Illinois. As of the 2010 census, its population was 339 and it contained 138 housing units.

== Geography ==
According to the 2010 census, the township has a total area of 34.62 square miles (89.7 km^{2}), of which 34.61 square miles (89.6 km^{2}) (or 99.97%) is land and 0.01 square miles (0.026 km^{2}) (or 0.03%) is water.

== Demographics ==
Historical population
Census	Pop.	Note	%±
2016 (est.)	333
U.S. Decennial Census
