= Shelbyville Township, Shelby County, Illinois =

Shelbyville Township
- Township

- Location of Illinois in the United States
- Coordinates: 39°23′21″N 88°44′52″W
- Country: United States
- State: Illinois
- County: Shelby
- Organized: November 8, 1859

Area
  - Total: 35.81 sq mi (92.7 km^{2})
  - Land: 34.04 sq mi (88.2 km^{2})
  - Water: 1.76 sq mi (4.6 km^{2})
- Elevation: 650 ft (200 m)

Population (2010)
  - Estimate (2016): 4,626
  - Density: 139.2/sq mi (53.7/km^{2})
- Time zone: UTC-6 (CST)
  - Summer (DST): UTC-5 (CDT)
- ZIP code: 62565
- Area code: 217
- FIPS code: 17-173-69199

Shelbyville Township is located in Shelby County, Illinois. As of the 2010 census, its population was 4,739 and it contained 2,308 housing units.

== Geography ==
According to the 2010 census, the township has a total area of 35.81 square miles (92.7 km^{2}), of which 34.04 square miles (88.2 km^{2}) (or 95.06%) is land and 1.76 square miles (4.6 km^{2}) (or 4.91%) is water.

== Demographics ==
Historical population
Census	Pop.	Note	%±
2016 (est.)	4,626
U.S. Decennial Census
