= Ridge Township, Shelby County, Illinois =

Ridge Township
- Township

- Location of Illinois in the United States
- Coordinates: 39°28′43″N 88°51′46″W
- Country: United States
- State: Illinois
- County: Shelby
- Organized: November 8, 1859

Area
  - Total: 35.4 sq mi (92 km^{2})
  - Land: 35.39 sq mi (91.7 km^{2})
  - Water: 0.01 sq mi (0.026 km^{2})
- Elevation: 650 ft (200 m)

Population (2010)
  - Estimate (2016): 417
  - Density: 12.1/sq mi (4.7/km^{2})
- Time zone: UTC-6 (CST)
  - Summer (DST): UTC-5 (CDT)
- ZIP code: XXXXX
- Area code: 217
- FIPS code: 17-173-63836

Ridge Township is located in Shelby County, Illinois. As of the 2010 census, its population was 427 and it contained 194 housing units. It contains the census-designated place of Westervelt.

== Geography ==
According to the 2010 census, the township has a total area of 35.4 square miles (92 km^{2}), of which 35.39 square miles (91.7 km^{2}) (or 99.97%) is land and 0.01 square miles (0.026 km^{2}) (or 0.03%) is water.

== Demographics ==
Historical population
Census	Pop.	Note	%±
2016 (est.)	417
U.S. Decennial Census
