= Stonington Township, Christian County, Illinois =

Stonington Township
- Township
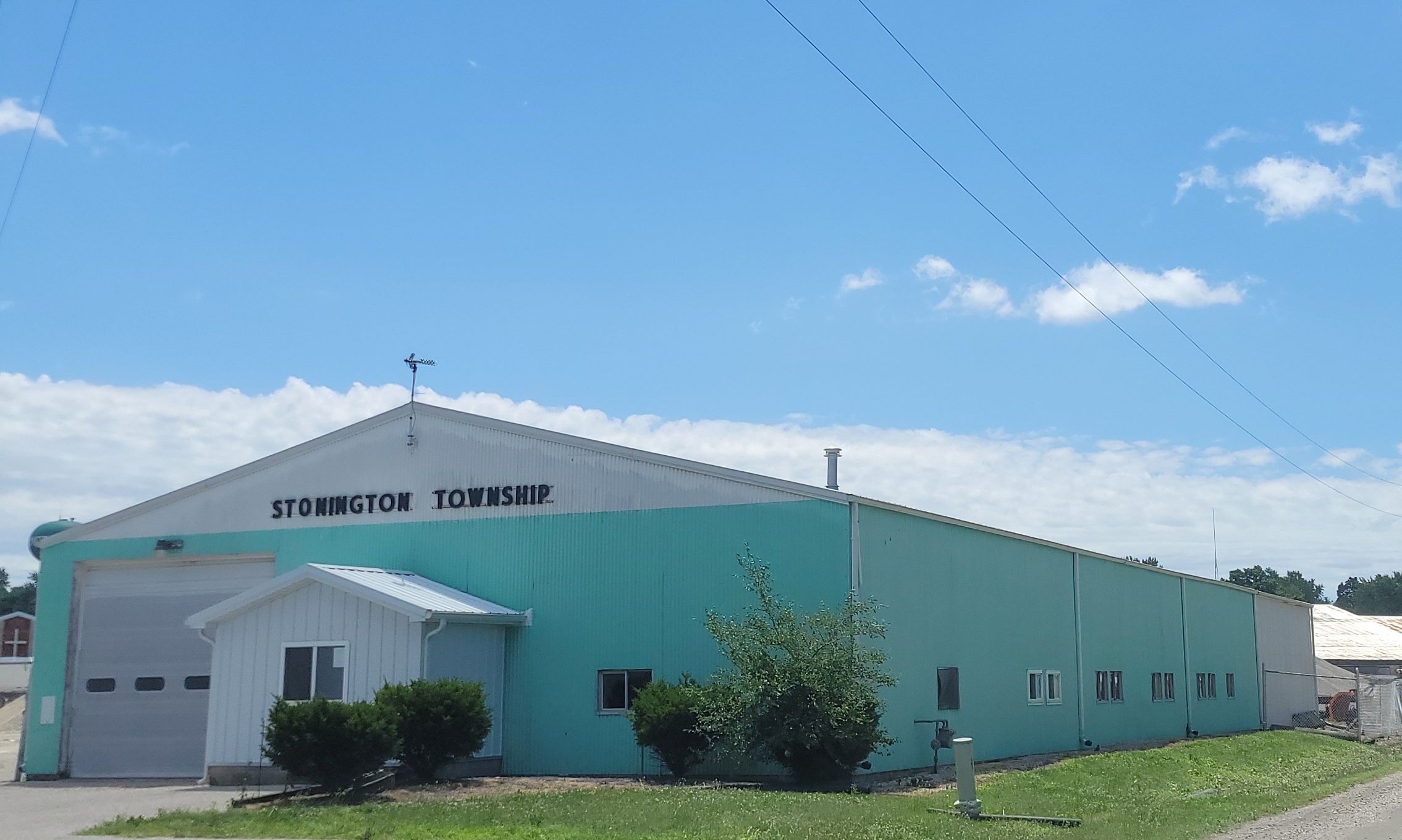
- Township building in Stonington

- Location in Christian County

- Christian County's location in Illinois
- Coordinates: 39°39′25″N 89°12′07″W
- Country: United States
- State: Illinois
- County: Christian
- Established: November 7, 1865

Area
  - Total: 36.17 sq mi (93.7 km^{2})
  - Land: 36.17 sq mi (93.7 km^{2})
  - Water: 0 sq mi (0 km^{2}) 0%
- Elevation: 610 ft (186 m)

Population (2020)
  - Total: 993
  - Density: 27.5/sq mi (10.6/km^{2})
- Time zone: UTC-6 (CST)
  - Summer (DST): UTC-5 (CDT)
- ZIP codes: 62513, 62531, 62567, 62568
- FIPS code: 17-021-72962

Stonington Township is one of seventeen townships in Christian County, Illinois, USA. As of the 2020 census, its population was 993 and it contained 467 housing units.

== Geography ==
According to the 2010 census, the township has a total area of 36.17 square miles (93.7 km^{2}), all land.

=== Cities, towns, villages ===
- Stonington

=== Unincorporated towns ===
- Sandersville at 39.611709°N 89.159805°W

=== Cemeteries ===
The township contains these three cemeteries: Mount Zion, Old Stonington and Ponting.

=== Major highways ===
- Illinois Route 48

=== Airports and landing strips ===
- McChristy Airport

== Demographics ==
Historical population
Census	Pop.	Note	%±
1870	738		—
1880	997		35.1%
1890	1,096		9.9%
1900	1,261		15.1%
1910	1,915		51.9%
1920	2,232		16.6%
1930	1,699		−23.9%
1940	1,688		−0.6%
1950	1,572		−6.9%
1960	1,545		−1.7%
1970	1,488		−3.7%
1980	1,462		−1.7%
1990	1,280		−12.4%
2000	1,180		−7.8%
2010	1,131		−4.2%
2020	993		−12.2%
U.S. Decennial Census

As of the 2020 census there were 993 people, 397 households, and 231 families residing in the township. The population density was 27.46 inhabitants per square mile (10.60/km^{2}). There were 467 housing units at an average density of 12.91 per square mile (4.98/km^{2}). The racial makeup of the township was 93.86% White, 0.40% African American, 0.10% Native American, 0.10% Asian, 0.10% Pacific Islander, 0.20% from other races, and 5.24% from two or more races. Hispanic or Latino of any race were 1.21% of the population.

There were 397 households, out of which 18.90% had children under the age of 18 living with them, 41.56% were married couples living together, 8.82% had a female householder with no spouse present, and 41.81% were non-families. 37.30% of all households were made up of individuals, and 18.10% had someone living alone who was 65 years of age or older. The average household size was 2.06 and the average family size was 2.70.

The township's age distribution consisted of 16.5% under the age of 18, 4.3% from 18 to 24, 24.8% from 25 to 44, 29.9% from 45 to 64, and 24.5% who were 65 years of age or older. The median age was 50.6 years. For every 100 females, there were 113.3 males. For every 100 females age 18 and over, there were 115.1 males.

The median income for a household in the township was $54,911, and the median income for a family was $66,563. Males had a median income of $50,179 versus $35,625 for females. The per capita income for the township was $30,058. About 17.3% of families and 12.8% of the population were below the poverty line, including 16.3% of those under age 18 and 14.4% of those age 65 or over.

== School districts ==
- Meridian Community Unit School District 15
- Taylorville Community Unit School District 3

== Political districts ==
- State House District 87
- State Senate District 44
