= Blue Mound, Illinois =

- Village
- Location in Macon County, Illinois
- Coordinates: 39°41′59″N 89°7′19″W
- Country: United States
- State: Illinois
- County: Macon
- Township: Pleasant View

Area
  - Total: 0.59 sq mi (1.52 km^{2})
  - Land: 0.59 sq mi (1.52 km^{2})
  - Water: 0 sq mi (0.00 km^{2})
- Elevation: 617 ft (188 m)

Population (2020)
  - Total: 1,133
  - Density: 1,936.2/sq mi (747.56/km^{2})
- Time zone: UTC-6 (CST)
  - Summer (DST): UTC-5 (CDT)
- ZIP Code: 62513
- Area code: 217
- FIPS code: 17-06756
- GNIS feature ID: 2398142
- Website: bluemoundil.gov

Blue Mound is a village in Macon County, Illinois, United States. The population was 1,133 at the 2020 census. It is included in the Decatur, Illinois Metropolitan Statistical Area.

== Geography ==
Blue Mound is located in southwestern Macon County. Illinois Route 48 passes through the village, leading northeast 14 miles (23 km) to Decatur, the county seat, and southwest the same distance to Taylorville.

According to the 2021 census gazetteer files, Blue Mound has a total area of 0.59 square miles (1.53 km^{2}), all land.

One and a half miles northwest of the village is the Blue Mound, a glacial kame, a cone-shaped gravel hill rising 80 feet (24 m) above the surrounding farmland. Surrounded by the Griswold Conservation Area, park and camping place, the mound is estimated to date from about 130,000 years ago in geologic time from melting of glacier ice. It is one of a group of glacial mounds in the Blue Mound area.

== Demographics ==
Historical population
Census	Pop.	Note	%±
1880	532		—
1890	696		30.8%
1900	714		2.6%
1910	900		26.1%
1920	881		−2.1%
1930	817		−7.3%
1940	811		−0.7%
1950	886		9.2%
1960	1,038		17.2%
1970	1,181		13.8%
1980	1,338		13.3%
1990	1,161		−13.2%
2000	1,129		−2.8%
2010	1,158		2.6%
2020	1,133		−2.2%
U.S. Decennial Census

As of the 2020 census there were 1,133 people, 453 households, and 268 families residing in the village. The population density was 1,936.75 inhabitants per square mile (747.78/km^{2}). The racial makeup of the village was 92.50% White, 0.79% African American, 0.71% Native American, 0.00% Asian, 0.00% Pacific Islander, 0.62% from other races, and 5.38% from two or more races. Hispanic or Latino of any race were 2.03% of the population.

There were 453 households, out of which 29.4% had children under the age of 18 living with them, 48.79% were married couples living together, 7.06% had a female householder with no husband present, and 40.84% were non-families. 37.31% of all households were made up of individuals, and 23.18% had someone living alone who was 65 years of age or older. The average household size was 3.34 and the average family size was 2.51.

The village's age distribution consisted of 25.6% under the age of 18, 8.5% from 18 to 24, 23.7% from 25 to 44, 20.8% from 45 to 64, and 21.5% who were 65 years of age or older. The median age was 37.6 years. For every 100 females, there were 72.5 males. For every 100 females age 18 and over, there were 67.0 males.

The median income for a household in the village was $49,877, and the median income for a family was $66,818. Males had a median income of $46,576 versus $26,014 for females. The per capita income for the village was $25,117. About 6.0% of families and 10.0% of the population were below the poverty line, including 11.5% of those under age 18 and 2.0% of those age 65 or over.

There were 491 housing units, of which 8.6% were vacant. The homeowner vacancy rate was 0.9% and the rental vacancy rate was 8.5%.

Racial composition as of the 2020 census
Race	Number	Percent
White	1,048	92.5%
Black or African American	9	0.8%
American Indian and Alaska Native	8	0.7%
Asian	0	0.0%
Native Hawaiian and Other Pacific Islander	0	0.0%
Some other race	7	0.6%
Two or more races	61	5.4%
Hispanic or Latino (of any race)	23	2.0%

== Education ==
It is a part of the Meridian Community Unit School District 15.

The district's comprehensive high school is Meridian High School.

== See also ==
- List of municipalities in Illinois
