= Alton Township, Madison County, Illinois =

Alton Township
- Township

- Location of Illinois in the United States
- Coordinates: 38°54′14″N 90°09′14″W
- Country: United States
- State: Illinois
- County: Madison
- Settled: November 2, 1875

Area
  - Total: 16.74 sq mi (43.4 km^{2})
  - Land: 15.47 sq mi (40.1 km^{2})
  - Water: 1.27 sq mi (3.3 km^{2})
- Elevation: 509 ft (155 m)

Population (2010)
  - Estimate (2016): 26,861
  - Density: 1,801.2/sq mi (695.4/km^{2})
- Time zone: UTC-6 (CST)
  - Summer (DST): UTC-5 (CDT)
- FIPS code: 17-119-01127
- Website: www.altontownshipil.gov

Alton Township is located in Madison County, Illinois, in the United States. As of the 2010 census, its population was 27,865 and it contained 13,266 housing units.

== See also ==
- Alton, Illinois, the city

== Geography ==
According to the 2010 census, the township has a total area of 16.74 square miles (43.4 km^{2}), of which 15.47 square miles (40.1 km^{2}) (or 92.41%) is land and 1.27 square miles (3.3 km^{2}) (or 7.59%) is water.

== Demographics ==
Historical population
Census	Pop.	Note	%±
2016 (est.)	26,861
U.S. Decennial Census
