= Holland Township, Illinois =

Holland Township
- Township

- Location of Illinois in the United States
- Coordinates: 39°14′38″N 88°44′45″W
- Country: United States
- State: Illinois
- County: Shelby
- Organized: November 8, 1859

Area
  - Total: 26.99 sq mi (69.9 km^{2})
  - Land: 26.99 sq mi (69.9 km^{2})
  - Water: 0 sq mi (0 km^{2})
- Elevation: 541 ft (165 m)

Population (2010)
  - Estimate (2016): 408
  - Density: 15.6/sq mi (6.0/km^{2})
- Time zone: UTC-6 (CST)
  - Summer (DST): UTC-5 (CDT)
- ZIP code: 62444
- Area code: 217
- FIPS code: 17-173-35567

Holland Township is located in Shelby County, Illinois. As of the 2010 census, its population was 420 and it contained 188 housing units. The 2010 Census indicates a population of 420. Current Township Officials are Supervisor Matt Forcum; Clerk Wanda Tabbert; Trustees Marvin Debolt, Larry Lieb, James Vonderhiede, and Pat Yakey; Highway Commissioner Larry Syfert; and Multi-Township Assessment District Assessor Paul Corley.

Holland Township is the site of the Holland Energy Plant, a natural gas fired energy production facility owned and operated by Hoosier Energy Rural Electric Cooperative and Wabash Valley Power Association, as well as the Delbert Mundt Water Treatment Facility owned and operated by EJ Water Cooperative of Dieterich, Illinois.

The Holland Township building is located at RR 1 Box 171A, Mode, Illinois 62444.

== Geography ==
According to the 2010 census, the township has a total area of 26.99 square miles (69.9 km^{2}), all land.

== Demographics ==
Historical population
Census	Pop.	Note	%±
2016 (est.)	408
U.S. Decennial Census
