= Freeport Township, Illinois =

Freeport Township
- Township
- Location in Stephenson County
- Coordinates: 42°17′25″N 89°38′05″W
- Country: United States
- State: Illinois
- County: Stephenson

Government
  - Supervisor: Patrick Sellers

Area
  - Total: 11.79 sq mi (30.5 km^{2})
  - Land: 11.78 sq mi (30.5 km^{2})
  - Water: 0.01 sq mi (0.026 km^{2}) 0.08%
- Elevation: 807 ft (246 m)

Population (2010)
  - Estimate (2016): 24,392
  - Density: 2,177/sq mi (841/km^{2})
- Time zone: UTC-6 (CST)
  - Summer (DST): UTC-5 (CDT)
- FIPS code: 17-177-27897
- Website: freeporttownship.org

Freeport Township is located in Stephenson County, Illinois. As of the 2010 census, its population was 25,638 and it contained 12,396 housing units. Freeport Township is coterminous with City of Freeport. It is one of fifteen coterminous townships in Illinois.

== Geography ==
According to the 2010 census, the township has a total area of 11.79 square miles (30.5 km^{2}), of which 11.78 square miles (30.5 km^{2}) (or 99.92%) is land and 0.01 square miles (0.026 km^{2}) (or 0.08%) is water.

=== Stagecoach inns ===
The Mansion House hotel on Walnut Street and Spring Streets in Freeport was built by Benjamin Goddard in 1838. It was an official stage stop on the Old State Road number 2, now Business U.S. Route 20, for the Frink, Walker & Company stage line Chicago to Galena 1839–1854. The building is no longer standing.

== Demographics ==
Historical population
Census	Pop.	Note	%±
2016 (est.)	24,392
U.S. Decennial Census
