= Mattoon Township, Coles County, Illinois =

Mattoon Township
- Township
- Location in Coles County

- Coles County's location in Illinois
- Coordinates: 39°29′N 88°25′W
- Country: United States
- State: Illinois
- County: Coles
- Established: November 8, 1859

Area
  - Total: 36.17 sq mi (93.7 km^{2})
  - Land: 36.17 sq mi (93.7 km^{2})
  - Water: 0 sq mi (0 km^{2}) 0%
- Elevation: 715 ft (218 m)

Population (2020)
  - Total: 14,668
  - Density: 405.5/sq mi (156.6/km^{2})
- Time zone: UTC-6 (CST)
  - Summer (DST): UTC-5 (CDT)
- ZIP codes: 61928, 61938
- FIPS code: 17-029-47566

Mattoon Township is one of twelve townships in Coles County, Illinois, USA. As of the 2020 census, its population was 14,668 and it contained 7,381 housing units.

== Geography ==
According to the 2010 census, the township has a total area of 36.2 square miles (94 km^{2}), all land.

=== Cities, towns, villages ===
- Mattoon (west half)

=== Extinct towns ===
- Lane Acres
- Lipsey
- Magnet
- Wabash Point

=== Cemeteries ===
The township contains two cemeteries: Calvary and Dodge Grove.

=== Major highways ===
- Interstate 57
- US Route 45
- Illinois Route 16
- Illinois Route 121

== Demographics ==
As of the 2020 census there were 14,668 people, 6,754 households, and 3,818 families residing in the township. The population density was 405.71 inhabitants per square mile (156.65/km^{2}). There were 7,381 housing units at an average density of 204.15 units per square mile (78.82 units/km^{2}). The racial makeup of the township was 89.56% White, 3.03% African American, 0.28% Native American, 0.61% Asian, 0.00% Pacific Islander, 1.02% from other races, and 5.49% from two or more races. Hispanic or Latino of any race were 3.10% of the population.

There were 6,754 households, out of which 25.20% had children under the age of 18 living with them, 34.76% were married couples living together, 15.65% had a female householder with no spouse present, and 43.47% were non-families. 36.80% of all households were made up of individuals, and 14.70% had someone living alone who was 65 years of age or older. The average household size was 2.19 and the average family size was 2.82.

The township's age distribution consisted of 20.7% under the age of 18, 8.4% from 18 to 24, 24.3% from 25 to 44, 26.5% from 45 to 64, and 20.2% who were 65 years of age or older. The median age was 43.7 years. For every 100 females, there were 94.7 males. For every 100 females age 18 and over, there were 92.0 males.

The median income for a household in the township was $43,799, and the median income for a family was $60,677. Males had a median income of $36,006 versus $29,442 for females. The per capita income for the township was $28,300. About 11.8% of families and 18.4% of the population were below the poverty line, including 28.0% of those under age 18 and 9.2% of those age 65 or over.

Historical population
Census	Pop.	Note	%±
2010	15,817		—
2020	14,668		−7.3%
U.S. Decennial Census

== School districts ==
- Mattoon Community Unit School District 2

== Political districts ==
- Illinois' 15th congressional district
- State House District 110
- State Senate District 55
