= Rose Township, Shelby County, Illinois =

Rose Township
- Township

- Location of Illinois in the United States
- Coordinates: 39°23′29″N 88°51′43″W
- Country: United States
- State: Illinois
- County: Shelby
- Organized: November 8, 1859

Area
  - Total: 35.58 sq mi (92.2 km^{2})
  - Land: 35.48 sq mi (91.9 km^{2})
  - Water: 0.09 sq mi (0.23 km^{2})
- Elevation: 584 ft (178 m)

Population (2010)
  - Estimate (2016): 1,810
  - Density: 52.1/sq mi (20.1/km^{2})
- Time zone: UTC-6 (CST)
  - Summer (DST): UTC-5 (CDT)
- ZIP code: XXXXX
- Area code: 217
- FIPS code: 17-173-65637

Rose Township is located in Shelby County, Illinois, USA. As of the 2010 census, its population was 1,848 and it contained 818 housing units.

== Geography ==
According to the 2010 census, the township has a total area of 35.58 square miles (92.2 km^{2}), of which 35.48 square miles (91.9 km^{2}) (or 99.72%) is land and 0.09 square miles (0.23 km^{2}) (or 0.25%) is water.

== Demographics ==
Historical population
Census	Pop.	Note	%±
2016 (est.)	1,810
U.S. Decennial Census
