= Shelby County, Illinois =

County in Illinois, United States

- County
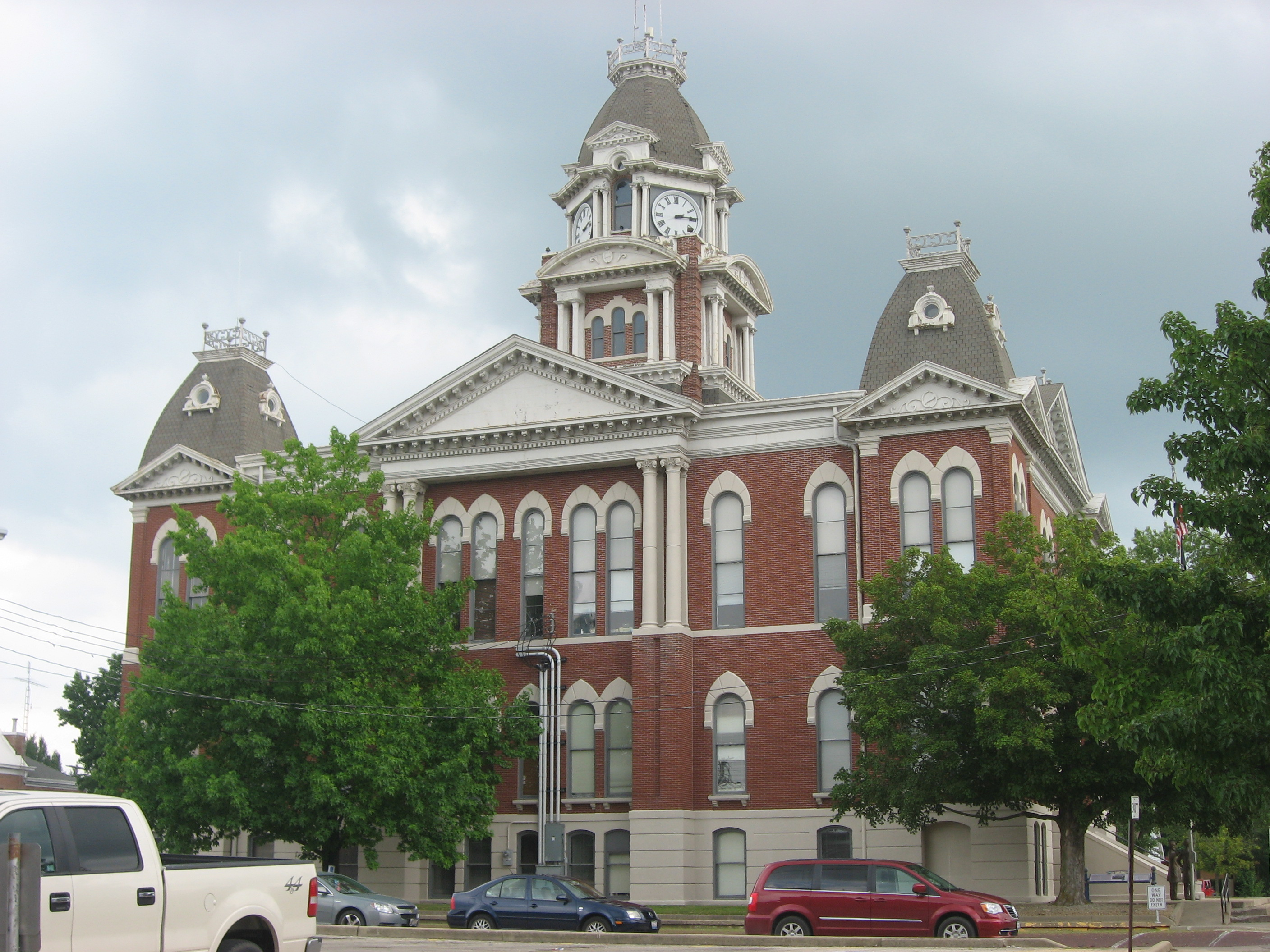
- Shelby County Courthouse

- Location within the U.S. state of Illinois
- Coordinates: 39°23′N 88°49′W
- Country: United States
- State: Illinois
- Founded: 1827
- Named for: Isaac Shelby
- Seat: Shelbyville
- Largest city: Shelbyville

Area
  - Total: 768 sq mi (1,990 km^{2})
  - Land: 759 sq mi (1,970 km^{2})
  - Water: 9.5 sq mi (25 km^{2}) 1.2%

Population (2020)
  - Total: 20,990
  - Estimate (2025): 20,576 ▼
  - Density: 27.7/sq mi (10.7/km^{2})
- Time zone: UTC−6 (Central)
  - Summer (DST): UTC−5 (CDT)
- Congressional district: 15th
- Website: www.shelbycounty-il.gov

Shelby County is a county located in the U.S. state of Illinois. According to the 2020 census, it had a population of 20,990. Its county seat is Shelbyville.

== History ==
Shelby County was established in 1827 out of Fayette County. It was named in honor of Isaac Shelby, governor of Kentucky and participant in the American Revolutionary War.

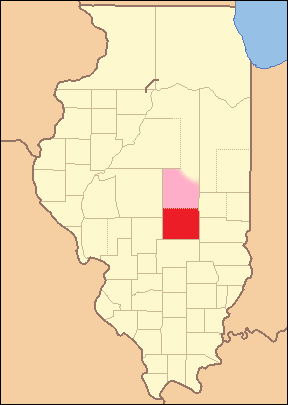
Shelby county from the time of its creation to 1829, including a large tract of unorganized territory temporarily attached to it, whose precise border was not defined.

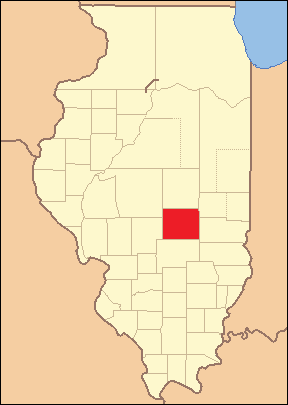
Shelby County between 1829 and 1839

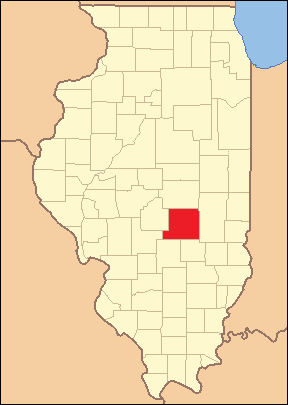
Shelby County between 1839 and 1843

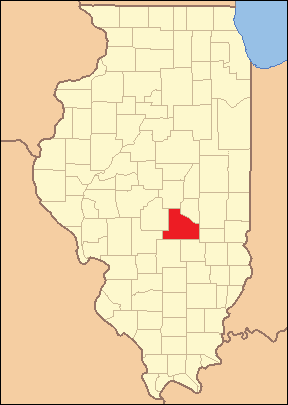
Shelby County in 1843, reduced to its present borders

== Geography ==
According to the U.S. Census Bureau, the county has a total area of 768 square miles (1,990 km^{2}), of which 759 square miles (1,970 km^{2}) is land and 9.5 square miles (25 km^{2}) (1.2%) is water.

=== Climate and weather ===
Shelbyville, Illinois

Climate chart (precipitation, max. and min. temperature)
J	F	M	A	M	J	J	A	S	O	N	D
2 34 19	1.9 41 24	3.3 52 33	3.7 65 43	4 75 53	4.1 83 62	4 87 66	3.3 85 63	3.1 80 56	3.1 68 45	3.9 52 35	3 39 24
- █ Average max. and min. temperatures in °F
- █ Precipitation totals in inches
- Source: The Weather Channel
Metric conversion
J	F	M	A	M	J	J	A	S	O	N	D
51 1 −7	48 5 −4	84 11 1	94 18 6	101 24 12	103 28 17	102 31 19	83 29 17	77 27 13	78 20 7	98 11 2	76 4 −4
- █ Average max. and min. temperatures in °C
- █ Precipitation totals in mm

In recent years, average temperatures in the county seat of Shelbyville have ranged from a low of 19 °F (−7 °C) in January to a high of 87 °F (31 °C) in July, although a record low of −26 °F (−32 °C) was recorded in January 1915 and a record high of 111 °F (44 °C) was recorded in July 1936. Average monthly precipitation ranged from 1.89 inches (48 mm) in February to 4.05 inches (103 mm) in June.

=== Major highways ===
- Interstate 57
- U.S. Highway 45
- U.S. Highway 51
- Illinois Route 16
- Illinois Route 32
- Illinois Route 128

=== Adjacent counties ===
- Macon County - north
- Moultrie County - northeast
- Coles County - east
- Cumberland County - east
- Effingham County - south
- Fayette County - south
- Montgomery County - southwest
- Christian County - west

== Demographics ==
Historical population
Census	Pop.	Note	%±
1830	2,972		—
1840	6,659		124.1%
1850	7,807		17.2%
1860	14,613		87.2%
1870	25,476		74.3%
1880	30,270		18.8%
1890	31,191		3.0%
1900	32,126		3.0%
1910	31,693		−1.3%
1920	29,601		−6.6%
1930	25,471		−14.0%
1940	26,290		3.2%
1950	24,434		−7.1%
1960	23,404		−4.2%
1970	22,589		−3.5%
1980	23,923		5.9%
1990	22,261		−6.9%
2000	22,893		2.8%
2010	22,363		−2.3%
2020	20,990		−6.1%
2025 (est.)	20,576	▼	−2.0%
U.S. Decennial Census; 1790-1960 1900-1990; 1990-2000 2010-2013

=== 2020 census ===
As of the 2020 census, the county had a population of 20,990. The median age was 45.4 years; 21.3% of residents were under the age of 18 and 23.1% of residents were 65 years of age or older. For every 100 females there were 99.6 males, and for every 100 females age 18 and over there were 97.7 males age 18 and over.

The racial makeup of the county was 96.2% White, 0.3% Black or African American, 0.2% American Indian and Alaska Native, 0.4% Asian, <0.1% Native Hawaiian and Pacific Islander, 0.5% from some other race, and 2.4% from two or more races. Hispanic or Latino residents of any race comprised 1.0% of the population.

23.5% of residents lived in urban areas, while 76.5% lived in rural areas.

There were 8,914 households in the county, of which 26.2% had children under the age of 18 living in them. Of all households, 53.2% were married-couple households, 18.4% were households with a male householder and no spouse or partner present, and 22.1% were households with a female householder and no spouse or partner present. About 28.9% of all households were made up of individuals and 14.6% had someone living alone who was 65 years of age or older.

There were 10,015 housing units, of which 11.0% were vacant. Among occupied housing units, 79.7% were owner-occupied and 20.3% were renter-occupied. The homeowner vacancy rate was 2.0% and the rental vacancy rate was 8.5%.

=== Racial and ethnic composition ===
Shelby County, Illinois – Racial and ethnic composition Note: the US Census treats Hispanic/Latino as an ethnic category. This table excludes Latinos from the racial categories and assigns them to a separate category. Hispanics/Latinos may be of any race.
Race / Ethnicity (NH = Non-Hispanic)	Pop 1980	Pop 1990	Pop 2000	Pop 2010	Pop 2020	% 1980	% 1990	% 2000	% 2010	% 2020
White alone (NH)	23,715	22,152	22,581	21,922	20,116	99.13%	99.51%	98.64%	98.03%	95.84%
Black or African American alone (NH)	21	14	35	48	65	0.09%	0.06%	0.15%	0.21%	0.31%
Native American or Alaska Native alone (NH)	19	26	24	39	35	0.08%	0.12%	0.10%	0.17%	0.17%
Asian alone (NH)	39	22	46	56	83	0.16%	0.10%	0.20%	0.25%	0.40%
Native Hawaiian or Pacific Islander alone (NH)	x	x	0	5	1	x	x	0.00%	0.02%	0.00%
Other race alone (NH)	16	2	5	4	40	0.07%	0.01%	0.02%	0.02%	0.19%
Mixed race or Multiracial (NH)	x	x	92	109	437	x	x	0.40%	0.49%	2.08%
Hispanic or Latino (any race)	113	45	110	180	213	0.47%	0.20%	0.48%	0.80%	1.01%
Total	23,923	22,261	22,893	22,363	20,990	100.00%	100.00%	100.00%	100.00%	100.00%

=== 2010 census ===
As of the 2010 United States census, there were 22,363 people, 9,216 households, and 6,376 families living in the county. The population density was 29.5 inhabitants per square mile (11.4/km^{2}). There were 10,396 housing units at an average density of 13.7 per square mile (5.3/km^{2}). The racial makeup of the county was 98.6% white, 0.3% Asian, 0.2% American Indian, 0.2% black or African American, 0.2% from other races, and 0.6% from two or more races. Those of Hispanic or Latino origin made up 0.8% of the population. In terms of ancestry, 25.5% were German, 9.9% were English, 9.8% were American, and 8.8% were Irish.

Of the 9,216 households, 29.2% had children under the age of 18 living with them, 57.1% were married couples living together, 8.0% had a female householder with no husband present, 30.8% were non-families, and 27.1% of all households were made up of individuals. The average household size was 2.40 and the average family size was 2.90. The median age was 43.5 years.

The median income for a household in the county was $44,627 and the median income for a family was $55,655. Males had a median income of $40,119 versus $27,860 for females. The per capita income for the county was $21,891. About 7.8% of families and 11.3% of the population were below the poverty line, including 16.7% of those under age 18 and 8.1% of those age 65 or over.

=== Census-designated place ===
The Census Bureau has defined one census-designated place (CDP) in Shelby County.

- Westervelt

== Government ==
=== Townships ===
Shelby County is divided into these townships:

- Ash Grove
- Big Spring
- Clarksburg
- Cold Spring
- Dry Point
- Flat Branch
- Herrick
- Holland
- Lakewood
- Moweaqua
- Oconee
- Okaw
- Penn
- Pickaway
- Prairie
- Richland
- Ridge
- Rose
- Rural
- Shelbyville
- Sigel
- Todds Point
- Tower Hill
- Windsor

== Communities ==
=== Cities ===
- Shelbyville (seat)
- Windsor

=== Town ===
- Sigel

=== Villages ===
- Cowden
- Findlay
- Herrick
- Moweaqua
- Oconee
- Stewardson
- Strasburg
- Tower Hill

=== Census-designated place ===
- Lakewood
- Westervelt

=== Other unincorporated communities ===
- Clarksburg
- Henton
- Mode

== Politics ==
United States presidential election results for Shelby County, Illinois
Year	Republican		Democratic		Third party(ies)	
Year	No.	%	No.	%	No.	%
1892	2,304	32.45%	3,523	49.62%	1,273	17.93%
1896	3,071	38.75%	4,709	59.42%	145	1.83%
1900	3,365	41.38%	4,514	55.52%	252	3.10%
1904	3,220	46.53%	2,962	42.80%	738	10.66%
1908	3,312	42.30%	4,065	51.92%	453	5.79%
1912	1,431	20.77%	3,467	50.33%	1,991	28.90%
1916	5,911	42.61%	7,515	54.18%	445	3.21%
1920	6,351	53.93%	5,113	43.42%	312	2.65%
1924	5,605	48.13%	5,265	45.21%	776	6.66%
1928	7,214	62.58%	4,071	35.31%	243	2.11%
1932	4,657	35.91%	8,093	62.40%	219	1.69%
1936	5,795	40.81%	8,186	57.64%	220	1.55%
1940	7,250	47.71%	7,704	50.69%	243	1.60%
1944	6,201	50.65%	5,919	48.35%	123	1.00%
1948	5,282	47.89%	5,589	50.68%	158	1.43%
1952	7,189	57.65%	5,268	42.25%	12	0.10%
1956	7,075	56.94%	5,337	42.95%	13	0.10%
1960	6,872	54.53%	5,720	45.39%	11	0.09%
1964	4,281	37.66%	7,088	62.34%	0	0.00%
1968	5,487	49.27%	4,528	40.66%	1,122	10.07%
1972	7,217	62.08%	4,389	37.75%	20	0.17%
1976	5,234	45.54%	6,172	53.70%	87	0.76%
1980	6,441	59.12%	3,988	36.61%	465	4.27%
1984	6,372	59.38%	4,317	40.23%	41	0.38%
1988	5,370	53.28%	4,650	46.14%	58	0.58%
1992	3,631	32.49%	5,101	45.65%	2,443	21.86%
1996	4,215	43.06%	4,249	43.41%	1,324	13.53%
2000	5,851	57.57%	4,018	39.54%	294	2.89%
2004	6,753	63.85%	3,744	35.40%	80	0.76%
2008	6,396	58.67%	4,245	38.94%	261	2.39%
2012	6,843	65.55%	3,342	32.01%	254	2.43%
2016	8,229	74.48%	2,288	20.71%	532	4.81%
2020	9,426	77.80%	2,504	20.67%	185	1.53%
2024	9,267	79.18%	2,240	19.14%	196	1.67%

== See also ==
- National Register of Historic Places listings in Shelby County
