= Herrick Township, Shelby County, Illinois =

Herrick Township
- Township

- Location of Illinois in the United States
- Coordinates: 39°14′40″N 88°58′08″W
- Country: United States
- State: Illinois
- County: Shelby
- Organized: Unknown

Area
  - Total: 17.4 sq mi (45 km^{2})
  - Land: 17.4 sq mi (45 km^{2})
  - Water: 0 sq mi (0 km^{2})
- Elevation: 597 ft (182 m)

Population (2010)
  - Estimate (2016): 607
  - Density: 36/sq mi (14/km^{2})
- Time zone: UTC-6 (CST)
  - Summer (DST): UTC-5 (CDT)
- ZIP code: XXXXX
- Area code: 618
- FIPS code: 17-173-34345

Herrick Township is located in Shelby County, Illinois. As of the 2010 census, its population was 626 and it contained 279 housing units.

== Geography ==
According to the 2010 census, the township has a total area of 17.4 square miles (45 km^{2}), all land.

== Demographics ==
Historical population
Census	Pop.	Note	%±
2016 (est.)	607
U.S. Decennial Census
