= Oconee Township, Shelby County, Illinois =

Oconee Township
- Township

- Location of Illinois in the United States
- Coordinates: 39°17′14″N 89°04′52″W
- Country: United States
- State: Illinois
- County: Shelby
- Organized: November 8, 1859

Area
  - Total: 55.2 sq mi (143 km^{2})
  - Land: 55.11 sq mi (142.7 km^{2})
  - Water: 0.08 sq mi (0.21 km^{2})
- Elevation: 659 ft (201 m)

Population (2010)
  - Estimate (2016): 760
  - Density: 14.1/sq mi (5.4/km^{2})
- Time zone: UTC-6 (CST)
  - Summer (DST): UTC-5 (CDT)
- ZIP code: XXXXX
- Area code: 217
- FIPS code: 17-173-55145

Oconee Township is located in Shelby County, Illinois. As of the 2010 census, its population was 776 and it contained 373 housing units.

== Geography ==
According to the 2010 census, the township has a total area of 55.2 square miles (143 km^{2}), of which 55.11 square miles (142.7 km^{2}) (or 99.84%) is land and 0.08 square miles (0.21 km^{2}) (or 0.14%) is water.

== Demographics ==
Historical population
Census	Pop.	Note	%±
2016 (est.)	760
U.S. Decennial Census
