= Pickaway Township, Shelby County, Illinois =

Pickaway Township
- Township

- Location of Illinois in the United States
- Coordinates: 39°33′47″N 88°52′09″W
- Country: United States
- State: Illinois
- County: Shelby
- Organized: November 8, 1859

Area
  - Total: 29.7 sq mi (77 km^{2})
  - Land: 29.7 sq mi (77 km^{2})
  - Water: 0 sq mi (0 km^{2})
- Elevation: 718 ft (219 m)

Population (2010)
  - Estimate (2016): 172
  - Density: 6/sq mi (2.3/km^{2})
- Time zone: UTC-6 (CST)
  - Summer (DST): UTC-5 (CDT)
- ZIP code: XXXXX
- Area code: 217
- FIPS code: 17-173-59663

Pickaway Township is located in Shelby County, Illinois. As of the 2010 census, its population was 179 and it contained 74 housing units.

== Geography ==
According to the 2010 census, the township has a total area of 29.7 square miles (77 km^{2}), all land.

== Demographics ==
Historical population
Census	Pop.	Note	%±
2016 (est.)	172
U.S. Decennial Census
