= Richland Township, Shelby County, Illinois =

Richland Township
- Township

- Location of Illinois in the United States
- Coordinates: 39°23′27″N 88°38′32″W
- Country: United States
- State: Illinois
- County: Shelby
- Organized: November 8, 1859

Area
  - Total: 36.32 sq mi (94.1 km^{2})
  - Land: 36.32 sq mi (94.1 km^{2})
  - Water: 0 sq mi (0 km^{2})
- Elevation: 696 ft (212 m)

Population (2010)
  - Estimate (2016): 732
  - Density: 21/sq mi (8.1/km^{2})
- Time zone: UTC-6 (CST)
  - Summer (DST): UTC-5 (CDT)
- ZIP code: XXXXX
- Area code: 217
- FIPS code: 17-173-63615

Richland Township is located in Shelby County, Illinois, USA. As of the 2010 census, its population was 762 and it contained 335 housing units.

== Geography ==
According to the 2010 census, the township has a total area of 36.32 square miles (94.1 km^{2}), all land.

== Demographics ==
Historical population
Census	Pop.	Note	%±
2016 (est.)	732
U.S. Decennial Census
