= Prairie Township, Shelby County, Illinois =

Prairie Township
- Township

- Location of Illinois in the United States
- Coordinates: 39°16′57″N 88°38′17″W
- Country: United States
- State: Illinois
- County: Shelby
- Organized: November 8, 1859

Area
  - Total: 54.16 sq mi (140.3 km^{2})
  - Land: 54.16 sq mi (140.3 km^{2})
  - Water: 0 sq mi (0 km^{2})
- Elevation: 640 ft (200 m)

Population (2010)
  - Estimate (2016): 1,221
  - Density: 23/sq mi (8.9/km^{2})
- Time zone: UTC-6 (CST)
  - Summer (DST): UTC-5 (CDT)
- ZIP code: XXXXX
- Area code: 217
- FIPS code: 17-173-61522

Prairie Township is located in Shelby County, Illinois. As of the 2010 census, its population was 1,247 and it contained 557 housing units.

== Geography ==
According to the 2010 census, the township has a total area of 54.16 square miles (140.3 km^{2}), all land.

== Demographics ==
Historical population
Census	Pop.	Note	%±
2016 (est.)	1,221
U.S. Decennial Census
