= Cincinnati Township, Pike County, Illinois =

Coordinates: 39°37′46″N 91°11′25″W

Cincinnati Township
- Township
- Location in Pike County

- Pike County's location in Illinois
- Country: United States
- State: Illinois
- County: Pike
- Established: Unknown

Area
  - Total: 26.73 sq mi (69.2 km^{2})
  - Land: 23.82 sq mi (61.7 km^{2})
  - Water: 2.91 sq mi (7.5 km^{2}) 10.89%

Population (2010)
  - Estimate (2016): 30
  - Density: 1.3/sq mi (0.50/km^{2})
- Time zone: UTC-6 (CST)
  - Summer (DST): UTC-5 (CDT)
- FIPS code: 17-149-14390

Cincinnati Township is located in Pike County, Illinois. As of the 2010 census, its population was 31 and it contained 54 housing units. Cincinnati formed from Pleasant Vale Township sometime before 1921.

== Geography ==
According to the 2010 census, the township has a total area of 26.73 square miles (69.2 km^{2}), of which 23.82 square miles (61.7 km^{2}) (or 89.11%) is land and 2.91 square miles (7.5 km^{2}) (or 10.89%) is water.

== Demographics ==
Historical population
Census	Pop.	Note	%±
2016 (est.)	30
U.S. Decennial Census
