= Lakewood Township, Shelby County, Illinois =

Lakewood Township
- Township

- Location of Illinois in the United States
- Coordinates: 39°18′39″N 88°51′19″W
- Country: United States
- State: Illinois
- County: Shelby
- Organized: January 19, 1911

Area
  - Total: 30.08 sq mi (77.9 km^{2})
  - Land: 30.08 sq mi (77.9 km^{2})
  - Water: 0 sq mi (0 km^{2})
- Elevation: 594 ft (181 m)

Population (2010)
  - Estimate (2016): 427
  - Density: 14.6/sq mi (5.6/km^{2})
- Time zone: UTC-6 (CST)
  - Summer (DST): UTC-5 (CDT)
- ZIP code: XXXXX
- Area code: 217
- FIPS code: 17-173-41690

Lakewood Township is located in Shelby County, Illinois. As of the 2010 census, its population was 439 and it contained 191 housing units.

== Geography ==
According to the 2010 census, the township has a total area of 30.08 square miles (77.9 km^{2}), all land.

== Demographics ==
Historical population
Census	Pop.	Note	%±
2016 (est.)	427
U.S. Decennial Census

The 2016 population estimate was 427 individuals.
