= Prairieton Township, Christian County, Illinois =

Prairieton Township
- Township
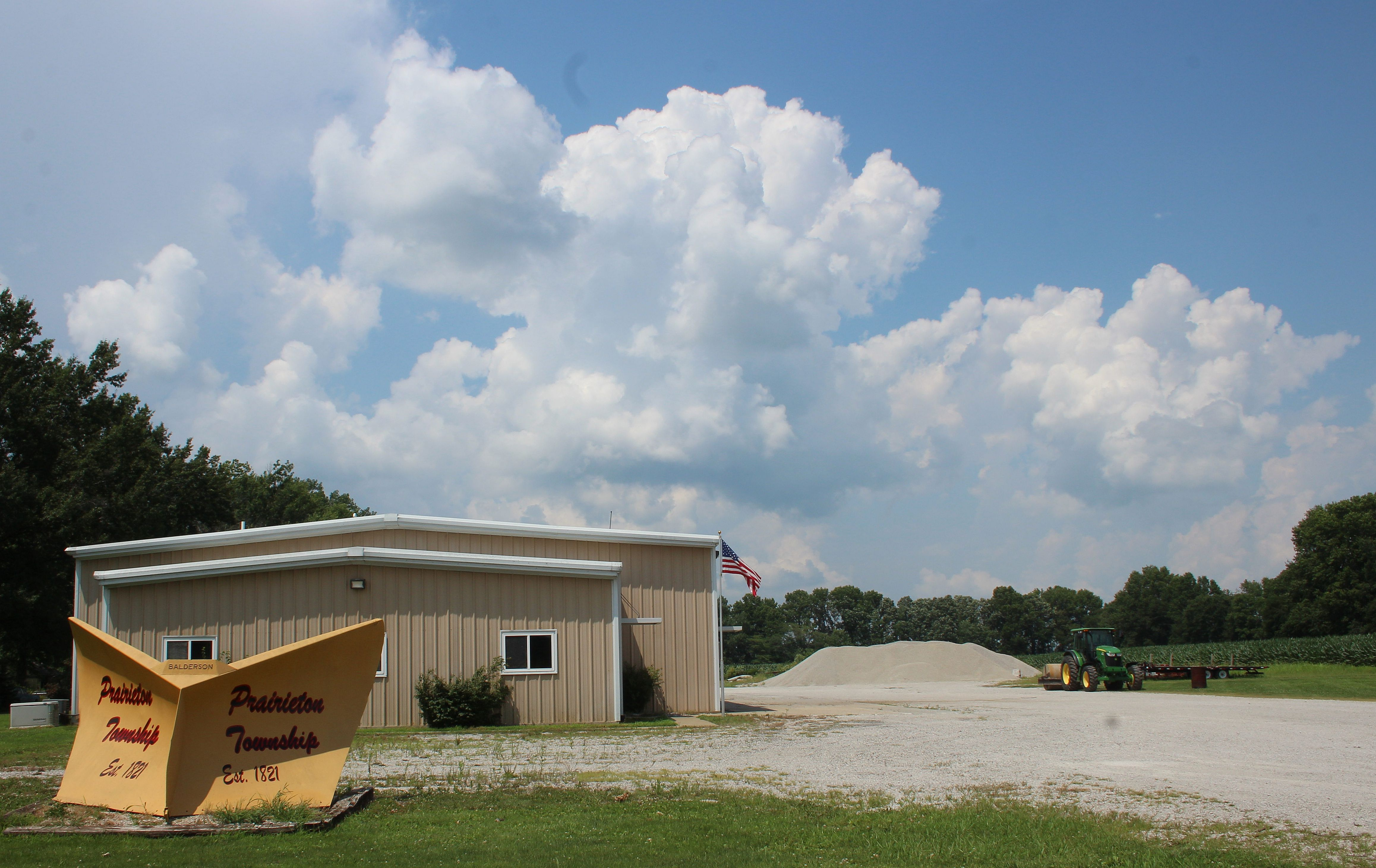

- Location in Christian County

- Christian County's location in Illinois
- Coordinates: 39°37′N 89°5′W
- Country: United States
- State: Illinois
- County: Christian
- Established: November 7, 1865

Area
  - Total: 36.58 sq mi (94.7 km^{2})
  - Land: 36.57 sq mi (94.7 km^{2})
  - Water: 0.02 sq mi (0.052 km^{2}) 0.05%
- Elevation: 594 ft (181 m)

Population (2020)
  - Total: 425
  - Density: 11.6/sq mi (4.49/km^{2})
- Time zone: UTC-6 (CST)
  - Summer (DST): UTC-5 (CDT)
- ZIP codes: 62510, 62550, 62567
- FIPS code: 17-021-61730

Prairieton Township is one of seventeen townships in Christian County, Illinois, United States. As of the 2020 census, its population was 425 and it contained 177 housing units.

== History ==
Like the other sixteen townships of the county, this township was established by an order of the Christian County commissioners' court in March 1866, after township organization had been approved by a countywide referendum on November 7, 1865. It was initially named Adams Township but was renamed Prairieton in April 1866.

== Geography ==
Prairieton is the northernmost of the three townships in Christian County that lie east of the third principal meridian. Like the others, it was originally placed in Shelby County in 1839, but was subsequently transferred to Christian County by the state legislature.

According to the 2010 census, the township has a total area of 36.58 square miles (94.7 km^{2}), of which 36.57 square miles (94.7 km^{2}) (or 99.97%) is land and 0.02 square miles (0.052 km^{2}) (or 0.05%) is water.

=== Cities, towns, villages ===
- Moweaqua (west side)

=== Unincorporated towns ===
- Radford at 39.5775°N 89.03453°W

=== Cemeteries ===
The township contains these four cemeteries: Adams, Bilyeu, Hayes and Jacobs.

=== Major highways ===
- U.S. Route 51

== Demographics ==
Historical population
Census	Pop.	Note	%±
1880	950		—
1890	1,067		12.3%
1900	1,028		−3.7%
1910	888		−13.6%
1920	833		−6.2%
1930	761		−8.6%
1940	654		−14.1%
1950	593		−9.3%
1960	487		−17.9%
1970	420		−13.8%
1980	459		9.3%
1990	537		17.0%
2000	492		−8.4%
2010	449		−8.7%
2020	425		−5.3%
U.S. Decennial Census

As of the 2020 census there were 425 people, 182 households, and 160 families residing in the township. The population density was 11.61 inhabitants per square mile (4.48/km^{2}). There were 177 housing units at an average density of 4.84 per square mile (1.87/km^{2}). The racial makeup of the township was 95.53% White, 1.41% African American, 0.00% Native American, 0.00% Asian, 0.00% Pacific Islander, 0.00% from other races, and 3.06% from two or more races. Hispanic or Latino of any race were 0.94% of the population.

There were 182 households, out of which 58.80% had children under the age of 18 living with them, 87.91% were married couples living together, 0.00% had a female householder with no spouse present, and 12.09% were non-families. 12.10% of all households were made up of individuals, and 10.40% had someone living alone who was 65 years of age or older. The average household size was 2.93 and the average family size was 3.19.

The township's age distribution consisted of 34.1% under the age of 18, 2.8% from 18 to 24, 35% from 25 to 44, 20.2% from 45 to 64, and 7.7% who were 65 years of age or older. The median age was 34.1 years. For every 100 females, there were 87.0 males. For every 100 females age 18 and over, there were 123.6 males.

The median income for a household in the township was $99,688, and the median income for a family was $102,083. Males had a median income of $53,472 versus $34,063 for females. The per capita income for the township was $33,404. About 5.6% of families and 3.8% of the population were below the poverty line.

== School districts ==
- Central A & M Community Unit School District 21
- Meridian Community Unit School District 15
- Taylorville Community Unit School District 3

== Political districts ==
- State House District 87
- State Senate District 44
