= Penn Township, Shelby County, Illinois =

Penn Township
- Township

- Location of Illinois in the United States
- Coordinates: 39°37′10″N 88°51′25″W
- Country: United States
- State: Illinois
- County: Shelby
- Organized: Unknown

Area
  - Total: 23.76 sq mi (61.5 km^{2})
  - Land: 23.76 sq mi (61.5 km^{2})
  - Water: 0 sq mi (0 km^{2})
- Elevation: 712 ft (217 m)

Population (2010)
  - Estimate (2016): 103
  - Density: 4.5/sq mi (1.7/km^{2})
- Time zone: UTC-6 (CST)
  - Summer (DST): UTC-5 (CDT)
- ZIP code: XXXXX
- Area code: 217
- FIPS code: 17-173-58590

Penn Township is located in Shelby County, Illinois. As of the 2010 census, its population was 107 and it contained 46 housing units.

== Geography ==
According to the 2010 census, the township has a total area of 23.76 square miles (61.5 km^{2}), all land.

== Demographics ==
Historical population
Census	Pop.	Note	%±
2016 (est.)	103
U.S. Decennial Census
