= Bement Township, Piatt County, Illinois =

Bement Township
- Township
- Location in Piatt County

- Piatt County's location in Illinois
- Coordinates: 39°55′34″N 88°32′29″W
- Country: United States
- State: Illinois
- County: Piatt
- Established: November 8, 1859

Area
  - Total: 48.32 sq mi (125.1 km^{2})
  - Land: 48.32 sq mi (125.1 km^{2})
  - Water: 0 sq mi (0 km^{2}) 0%
- Elevation: 669 ft (204 m)

Population (2010)
  - Estimate (2016): 1,857
  - Density: 39.2/sq mi (15.1/km^{2})
- Time zone: UTC-6 (CST)
  - Summer (DST): UTC-5 (CDT)
- FIPS code: 17-147-05157

Bement Township is a township in Piatt County, Illinois, USA. As of the 2010 census, its population was 1,893 and it contained 798 housing units.

== Geography ==
According to the 2010 census, the township has a total area of 48.32 square miles (125.1 km^{2}), all land.

=== Cities and towns ===
- Bement
- Ivesdale (west quarter)

=== Extinct towns ===
- Bodmann
- Piatt

=== Adjacent townships ===
- Monticello Township (north)
- Colfax Township, Champaign County (northeast)
- Sadorus Township, Champaign County (east)
- Garrett Township, Douglas County (southeast)
- Unity Township (south)
- Cerro Gordo Township (southwest)
- Willow Branch Township (northwest)

=== Cemeteries ===
The township contains one cemetery, Bement.

=== Major highways ===
- Illinois State Route 105

=== Airports and landing strips ===
- Bartram Landing Strip
- Kirwan Landing Strip
- Triple Creek Airport

== Demographics ==
Historical population
Census	Pop.	Note	%±
2016 (est.)	1,857
U.S. Decennial Census
