= Monticello Township, Piatt County, Illinois =

Monticello Township
- Township
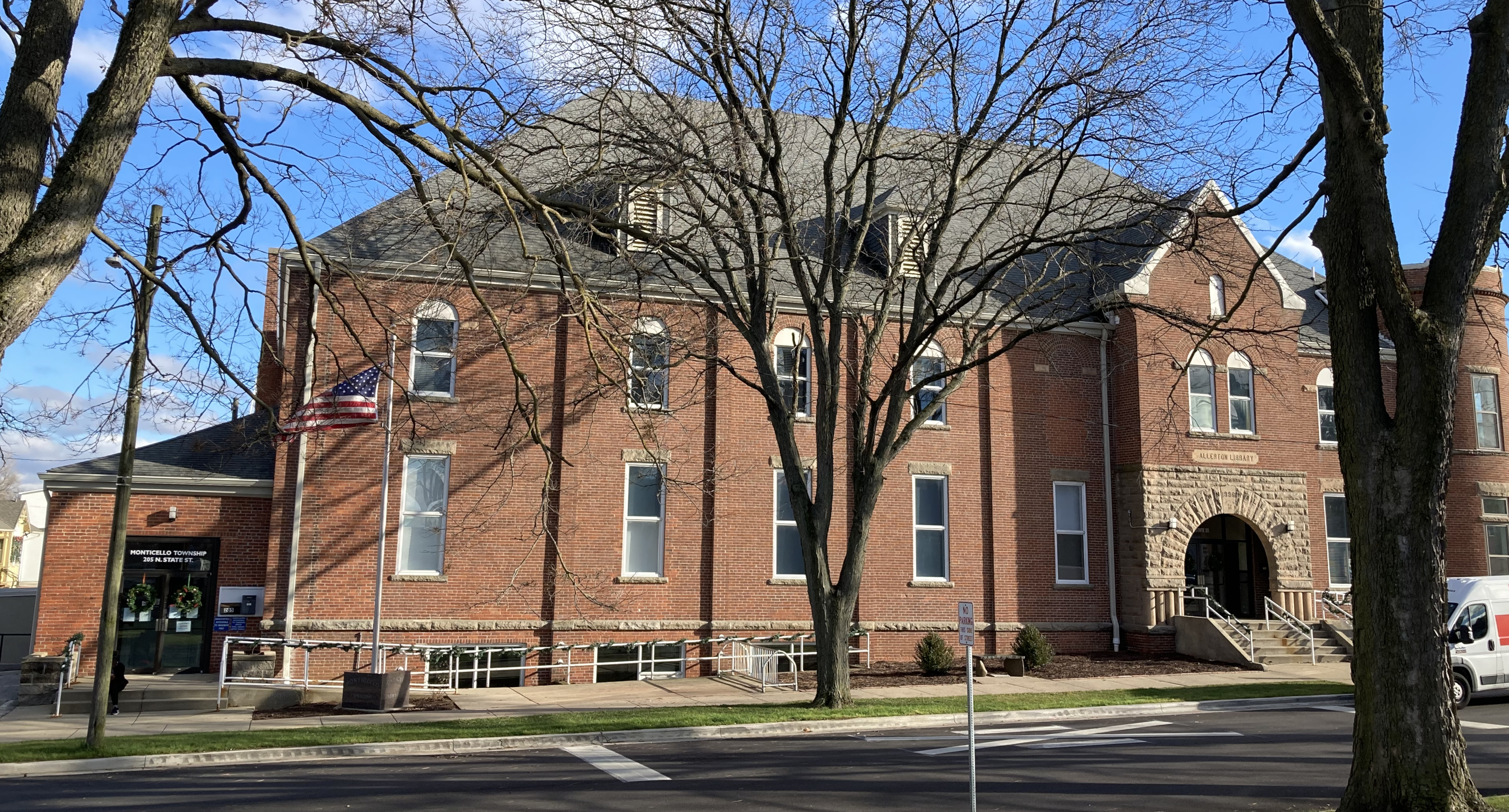
- Township Office and Allerton Library

- Location in Piatt County

- Piatt County's location in Illinois
- Coordinates: 40°00′34″N 88°32′17″W
- Country: United States
- State: Illinois
- County: Piatt
- Established: November 8, 1859

Area
  - Total: 48.11 sq mi (124.6 km^{2})
  - Land: 48.05 sq mi (124.4 km^{2})
  - Water: 0.06 sq mi (0.16 km^{2}) 0.12%
- Elevation: 712 ft (217 m)

Population (2010)
  - Estimate (2016): 5,940
  - Density: 122.9/sq mi (47.5/km^{2})
- Time zone: UTC-6 (CST)
  - Summer (DST): UTC-5 (CDT)
- FIPS code: 17-147-50257

Monticello Township is a township in Piatt County, Illinois, USA. As of the 2010 census, its population was 5,906 and it contained 2,651 housing units.

== Geography ==
Monticello is Township 18 North, Range 6 East and part of Township 18 North, Range 5 East of the Third Principal Meridian.

According to the 2010 census, the township has a total area of 48.11 square miles (124.6 km^{2}), of which 48.05 square miles (124.4 km^{2}) (or 99.88%) is land and 0.06 square miles (0.16 km^{2}) (or 0.12%) is water. The streams of Camp Creek and Goose Creek are tributaries of the Sangamon River which runs through this township.

=== Cities and towns ===
- Monticello (large majority)

=== Adjacent townships ===
- Sangamon Township (north)
- Scott Township, Champaign County (northeast)
- Colfax Township, Champaign County (east)
- Sadorus Township, Champaign County (southeast)
- Bement Township (south)
- Willow Branch Township (west)
- Goose Creek Township (northwest)

=== Cemeteries ===
The township contains several cemeteries: Haneline (Section 14, T. 18 N., R. 5 E.), Monticello, Monticello and Woolington. Barnes Cemetery is in Section 1, T. 18 N., R. 6 E.

=== Schools ===
Haneline School No. 69 (Section 23, T. 18 N., R. 5 E.), a brick building, is now a residence on Allerton Road.

=== Major highways ===
- Interstate 72
- Illinois State Route 105

=== Airports and landing strips ===
- Piatt County Airport

== Demographics ==
Historical population
Census	Pop.	Note	%±
2016 (est.)	5,940
U.S. Decennial Census

As of 2025, Monticello township had a population of 6,154, with a median age of 46.7.
