= Pesotum Township, Champaign County, Illinois =

Pesotum Township
- Township
- Location in Champaign County

- Champaign County's location in Illinois
- Coordinates: 39°55′14″N 88°17′45″W
- Country: United States
- State: Illinois
- County: Champaign

Area
  - Total: 35.11 sq mi (90.9 km^{2})
  - Land: 35.07 sq mi (90.8 km^{2})
  - Water: 0.04 sq mi (0.10 km^{2}) 0.11%
- Elevation: 696 ft (212 m)

Population (2020)
  - Total: 882
  - Density: 25.1/sq mi (9.71/km^{2})
- Time zone: UTC-6 (CST)
  - Summer (DST): UTC-5 (CDT)
- FIPS code: 17-019-59286

Pesotum Township is a township in Champaign County, Illinois, USA. As of the 2020 census, its population was 882 and it contained 378 housing units.

== History ==
Pesotum Township was formed from a part of Sadorus Township on an unknown date.

== Geography ==
Pesotum is Township 17 North, Range 8 East of the Third Principal Meridian.

According to the 2010 census, the township has a total area of 35.11 square miles (90.9 km^{2}), of which 35.07 square miles (90.8 km^{2}) (or 99.89%) is land and 0.04 square miles (0.10 km^{2}) (or 0.11%) is water.

=== Cities and towns ===
- Pesotum

=== Cemeteries ===
The township contains these cemeteries, Andy Rock (Section 19), Peabody burials, and Pesotum.

=== Major highways ===
- Interstate 57
- U.S. Route 45

== Demographics ==
As of the 2020 census there were 882 people, 331 households, and 174 families residing in the township. The population density was 25.12 inhabitants per square mile (9.70/km^{2}). There were 378 housing units at an average density of 10.76 per square mile (4.15/km^{2}). The racial makeup of the township was 95.58% White, 0.57% African American, 0.00% Native American, 0.11% Asian, 0.00% Pacific Islander, 0.68% from other races, and 3.06% from two or more races. Hispanic or Latino of any race were 1.36% of the population.

There were 331 households, out of which 21.10% had children under the age of 18 living with them, 39.88% were married couples living together, 3.02% had a female householder with no spouse present, and 47.43% were non-families. 44.10% of all households were made up of individuals, and 28.40% had someone living alone who was 65 years of age or older. The average household size was 2.40 and the average family size was 3.44.

The township's age distribution consisted of 25.9% under the age of 18, 4.3% from 18 to 24, 17.7% from 25 to 44, 33.1% from 45 to 64, and 19.1% who were 65 years of age or older. The median age was 46.3 years. For every 100 females, there were 78.1 males. For every 100 females age 18 and over, there were 102.1 males.

The median income for a household in the township was $72,292, and the median income for a family was $90,833. Males had a median income of $52,727 versus $43,281 for females. The per capita income for the township was $32,151. About 5.7% of families and 6.3% of the population were below the poverty line, including 1.0% of those under age 18 and 2.6% of those age 65 or over.

Historical population
Census	Pop.	Note	%±
2010	845		—
2020	882		4.4%
U.S. Decennial Census
