= Stanton Township, Champaign County, Illinois =

Stanton Township
- Township
- Location in Champaign County

- Champaign County's location in Illinois
- Coordinates: 40°11′14″N 88°03′53″W
- Country: United States
- State: Illinois
- County: Champaign

Area
  - Total: 34.76 sq mi (90.0 km^{2})
  - Land: 34.71 sq mi (89.9 km^{2})
  - Water: 0.06 sq mi (0.16 km^{2}) 0.17%
- Elevation: 669 ft (204 m)

Population (2020)
  - Total: 514
  - Density: 14.8/sq mi (5.72/km^{2})
- Time zone: UTC-6 (CST)
  - Summer (DST): UTC-5 (CDT)
- FIPS code: 17-019-72273

Stanton Township is a township in Champaign County, Illinois, USA. As of the 2020 census, its population was 514 and it contained 200 housing units.

== History ==
Stanton Township formed from a portion of St. Joseph Township on an unknown date. The first settler in the township was called Samuel McClughen, who came from Ohio in 1834.

== Geography ==
Stanton is Township 20 North, Range 10 East of the Third Principal Meridian.

According to the 2010 census, the township has a total area of 34.76 square miles (90.0 km^{2}), of which 34.71 square miles (89.9 km^{2}) (or 99.86%) is land and 0.06 square miles (0.16 km^{2}) (or 0.17%) is water. The stream of Spoon River runs through this township.

=== Cemeteries ===
Cemeteries in Stanton Township include: Huls Cemetery South (also known as Stanton Friends or Friends Church).

=== Unincorporated towns ===
- Sellers

(This list is based on USGS data and may include former settlements.)

=== Airports and landing strips ===
- Flessner Landing Field

== Demographics ==
As of the 2020 census there were 514 people, 238 households, and 167 families residing in the township. The population density was 14.79 inhabitants per square mile (5.71/km^{2}). There were 200 housing units at an average density of 5.75 per square mile (2.22/km^{2}). The racial makeup of the township was 94.75% White, 0.97% African American, 0.19% Native American, 0.19% Asian, 0.00% Pacific Islander, 0.19% from other races, and 3.70% from two or more races. Hispanic or Latino of any race were 1.95% of the population.

There were 238 households, out of which 21.80% had children under the age of 18 living with them, 68.49% were married couples living together, 0.00% had a female householder with no spouse present, and 29.83% were non-families. 29.80% of all households were made up of individuals, and 5.00% had someone living alone who was 65 years of age or older. The average household size was 2.33 and the average family size was 2.86.

The township's age distribution consisted of 23.1% under the age of 18, 1.6% from 18 to 24, 17.1% from 25 to 44, 37.2% from 45 to 64, and 20.9% who were 65 years of age or older. The median age was 53.7 years. For every 100 females, there were 131.3 males. For every 100 females age 18 and over, there were 146.8 males.

The median income for a household in the township was $92,616, and the median income for a family was $94,157. Males had a median income of $66,250 versus $30,341 for females. The per capita income for the township was $39,124. No families and 9.7% of the population were below the poverty line.

Historical population
Census	Pop.	Note	%±
2010	505		—
2020	514		1.8%
U.S. Decennial Census
