= Somer Township, Champaign County, Illinois =

Somer Township
- Township
- Location in Champaign County

- Champaign County's location in Illinois
- Coordinates: 40°10′49″N 88°11′13″W
- Country: United States
- State: Illinois
- County: Champaign
- Established: November 8, 1859

Area
  - Total: 32.64 sq mi (84.5 km^{2})
  - Land: 32.61 sq mi (84.5 km^{2})
  - Water: 0.03 sq mi (0.078 km^{2}) 0.09%
- Elevation: 732 ft (223 m)

Population (2020)
  - Total: 988
  - Density: 30.3/sq mi (11.7/km^{2})
- Time zone: UTC-6 (CST)
  - Summer (DST): UTC-5 (CDT)
- FIPS code: 17-019-70382

Somer Township is a township in Champaign County, Illinois, USA. As of the 2020 census, its population was 988 and it contained 469 housing units.

== History ==
Somer Township changed its name from Pleasant Hill Township on April 30, 1860.

== Geography ==
Somer is Township 20 North, Range 9 East of the Third Principal Meridian.

According to the 2021 census gazetteer files, Somer Township has a total area of 32.64 square miles (84.54 km^{2}), of which 32.61 square miles (84.46 km^{2}) (or 99.91%) is land and 0.03 square miles (0.08 km^{2}) (or 0.09%) is water.

=== Unincorporated towns ===
- Leverett
- Wilbur Heights

(This list is based on USGS data and may include former settlements.)

=== Cemeteries ===
The township contains these cemeteries: Clements (Section 35), Coslet and Yearsley (Section 26).

Historic cemeteries (some of these may no longer be visible): Adkins Grave Yard (Section 21), Brownfield (Section 26), Heater (Section 23), Indian burial ground (Section 16), Methodist Church site (Section 27), Rhinehart Grave Yard (Section 34), Somers (Section 27).

=== Grain Elevators ===
Leverett elevator (Section 17) was built along the Illinois Central (which was absorbed by Canadian National Railway in 1998).

Sharp's Crossing elevator (Section 4) was built on the short–lived Kankakee and Urbana Traction Company interurban line around 1920, and was operated by the Sharp Grain Company. The wooden elevator on the west side of U.S. Route 45 at County Road 2300 North was destroyed by fire.

=== Public transit ===
- Champaign–Urbana Mass Transit District

=== Major highways ===
- Interstate 57
- U.S. Route 45

== Demographics ==
As of the 2020 census there were 988 people, 482 households, and 237 families residing in the township. The population density was 30.27 inhabitants per square mile (11.69/km^{2}). There were 469 housing units at an average density of 14.37 per square mile (5.55/km^{2}). The racial makeup of the township was 75.81% White, 10.12% African American, 0.81% Native American, 1.42% Asian, 0.20% Pacific Islander, 2.13% from other races, and 9.51% from two or more races. Hispanic or Latino of any race were 4.66% of the population.

There were 482 households, out of which 11.80% had children under the age of 18 living with them, 40.46% were married couples living together, 8.71% had a female householder with no spouse present, and 50.83% were non-families. 47.30% of all households were made up of individuals, and 6.80% had someone living alone who was 65 years of age or older. The average household size was 1.83 and the average family size was 2.62.

The township's age distribution consisted of 14.5% under the age of 18, 3.9% from 18 to 24, 10.4% from 25 to 44, 41.7% from 45 to 64, and 29.7% who were 65 years of age or older. The median age was 52.5 years. For every 100 females, there were 136.5 males. For every 100 females age 18 and over, there were 138.6 males.

The median income for a household in the township was $63,229, and the median income for a family was $63,281. Males had a median income of $67,019 versus $31,058 for females. The per capita income for the township was $39,315. About 14.8% of families and 16.3% of the population were below the poverty line, including 74.2% of those under age 18 and 9.9% of those age 65 or over.

Historical population
Census	Pop.	Note	%±
2010	1,268		—
2020	988		−22.1%
U.S. Decennial Census
