= Harwood Township, Illinois =

Harwood Township
- Township
- Location in Champaign County

- Champaign County's location in Illinois
- Coordinates: 40°21′48″N 88°03′06″W
- Country: United States
- State: Illinois
- County: Champaign
- Established: September 1869

Area
  - Total: 36.86 sq mi (95.5 km^{2})
  - Land: 36.85 sq mi (95.4 km^{2})
  - Water: 0.01 sq mi (0.026 km^{2}) 0.03%
- Elevation: 750 ft (230 m)

Population (2020)
  - Total: 610
  - Density: 17/sq mi (6.4/km^{2})
- Time zone: UTC-6 (CST)
  - Summer (DST): UTC-5 (CDT)
- FIPS code: 17-019-33422

Harwood Township is a township in Champaign County, Illinois, USA. As of the 2020 census, its population was 610 and it contained 273 housing units.

== History ==
Harwood Township formed from Ludlow Township as Sheldon Township in September, 1869. Then the name was changed to Shuck Township on an unknown date, then to Harwood Township on February 22, 1870 in Abel Harwood (1814-1891), a delegate to the Illinois state constitutional convention, representing Champaign and other counties.

== Geography ==
Harwood is Township 22 North, Range 10 East of the Third Principal Meridian.

According to the 2010 census, the township has a total area of 36.86 square miles (95.5 km^{2}), of which 36.85 square miles (95.4 km^{2}) (or 99.97%) is land and 0.01 square miles (0.026 km^{2}) (or 0.03%) is water.

=== Cities and towns ===
- Gifford (northwest quarter)

=== Unincorporated towns ===
- Dillsburg, which had a rail station.

(This list is based on USGS data and may include former settlements.)

=== Cemeteries ===
The township contains six cemeteries: Harwood Chapel, Heater, Hitz Family, Holy Sepulchre, Holy Sepulchre and Huffman.

=== Major highways ===
- U.S. Route 136

== Demographics ==
As of the 2020 census there were 610 people, 256 households, and 162 families residing in the township. The population density was 16.55 inhabitants per square mile (6.39/km^{2}). There were 273 housing units at an average density of 7.41 per square mile (2.86/km^{2}). The racial makeup of the township was 84.75% White, 0.66% African American, 0.49% Native American, 0.16% Asian, 0.00% Pacific Islander, 9.51% from other races, and 4.43% from two or more races. Hispanic or Latino of any race were 13.44% of the population.

There were 256 households, out of which 34.40% had children under the age of 18 living with them, 55.86% were married couples living together, 7.42% had a female householder with no spouse present, and 36.72% were non-families. 34.80% of all households were made up of individuals, and 27.70% had someone living alone who was 65 years of age or older. The average household size was 2.40 and the average family size was 3.17.

The township's age distribution consisted of 23.5% under the age of 18, 6.7% from 18 to 24, 15.6% from 25 to 44, 24.6% from 45 to 64, and 29.6% who were 65 years of age or older. The median age was 48.0 years. For every 100 females, there were 73.2 males. For every 100 females age 18 and over, there were 65.5 males.

The median income for a household in the township was $68,750, and the median income for a family was $98,929. Males had a median income of $51,389 versus $32,083 for females. The per capita income for the township was $37,495. About 4.3% of families and 4.1% of the population were below the poverty line, including 6.1% of those under age 18 and 1.6% of those age 65 or over.

Historical population
Census	Pop.	Note	%±
2010	623		—
2020	610		−2.1%
U.S. Decennial Census
