= Pesotum =

Pesotum may refer to:

- Pesotum, Illinois, a village in Champaign County, Illinois, United States
- Pesotum (fungus), a fungus genus in the family Ophiostomataceae
