= Cunningham Township, Champaign County, Illinois =

Cunningham Township
- Township
- Location in Champaign County

- Champaign County's location in Illinois
- Coordinates: 40°06′31″N 88°12′19″W
- Country: United States
- State: Illinois
- County: Champaign
- Established: Late 1928

Government
  - Supervisor: Danielle Chynoweth
  - Assessor: Ivana Owona

Area
  - Total: 11.90 sq mi (30.8 km^{2})
  - Land: 11.83 sq mi (30.6 km^{2})
  - Water: 0.07 sq mi (0.18 km^{2}) 0.6%
- Elevation: 732 ft (223 m)

Population (2020)
  - Total: 38,336
  - Density: 3,241/sq mi (1,251/km^{2})
- Time zone: UTC-6 (CST)
  - Summer (DST): UTC-5 (CDT)
- FIPS code: 17-019-18121
- Website: ctso.org

Cunningham Township is a township in Champaign County, Illinois, United States. As of the 2020 census, its population was 38,336 and it contained 18,321 housing units. Cunningham Township is coterminous with the City of Urbana. It is one of two coterminous townships in Champaign County and one of fifteen coterminous townships statewide.

== History ==
Cunningham Township formed from Champaign Township in late 1928.

== Geography ==
According to the 2021 census gazetteer files, Cunningham Township has a total area of 11.90 square miles (30.82 km^{2}), of which 11.83 square miles (30.64 km^{2}) (or 99.40%) is land and 0.07 square miles (0.18 km^{2}) (or 0.60%) is water.

=== Cities and towns ===
- Urbana

=== Unincorporated towns ===
- Mira

(This list is based on USGS data and may include former settlements.)

=== Cemeteries ===
The township contains three cemeteries: East Lawn, Eastlawn Addition and Harvey.

=== Public transit ===
- Champaign–Urbana Mass Transit District

=== Major highways ===
- Interstate 74
- U.S. Route 45
- U.S. Route 150
- Illinois State Route 130

=== Airports and landing strips ===
- Carle Hospital Heliport
- County Emergency Services-Disaster Agency Heliport
- Frasca Field
- Illini Airport

== Demographics ==
As of the 2020 census there were 38,336 people, 17,295 households, and 6,680 families residing in the township. The population density was 3,220.97 inhabitants per square mile (1,243.62/km^{2}). There were 18,321 housing units at an average density of 1,539.32 per square mile (594.33/km^{2}). The racial makeup of the township was 51.61% White, 18.86% African American, 0.30% Native American, 18.26% Asian, 0.03% Pacific Islander, 3.57% from other races, and 7.37% from two or more races. Hispanic or Latino of any race were 8.52% of the population.

There were 17,295 households, out of which 17.10% had children under the age of 18 living with them, 25.57% were married couples living together, 8.99% had a female householder with no spouse present, and 61.38% were non-families. 44.60% of all households were made up of individuals, and 8.10% had someone living alone who was 65 years of age or older. The average household size was 2.06 and the average family size was 2.70.

The township's age distribution consisted of 11.7% under the age of 18, 38.2% from 18 to 24, 26.1% from 25 to 44, 13.4% from 45 to 64, and 10.5% who were 65 years of age or older. The median age was 25.0 years. For every 100 females, there were 97.8 males. For every 100 females age 18 and over, there were 97.2 males.

The median income for a household in the township was $35,984, and the median income for a family was $66,955. Males had a median income of $27,150 versus $25,511 for females. The per capita income for the township was $25,365. About 11.4% of families and 29.1% of the population were below the poverty line, including 19.1% of those under age 18 and 5.6% of those age 65 or over.

Historical population
| Census | Pop. | Note | %± |
|---|---|---|---|
| 2010 | 41,250 | | — |
| 2020 | 38,336 | | −7.1% |
U.S. Decennial Census
