= Champaign County, Illinois =

Champaign County
- County
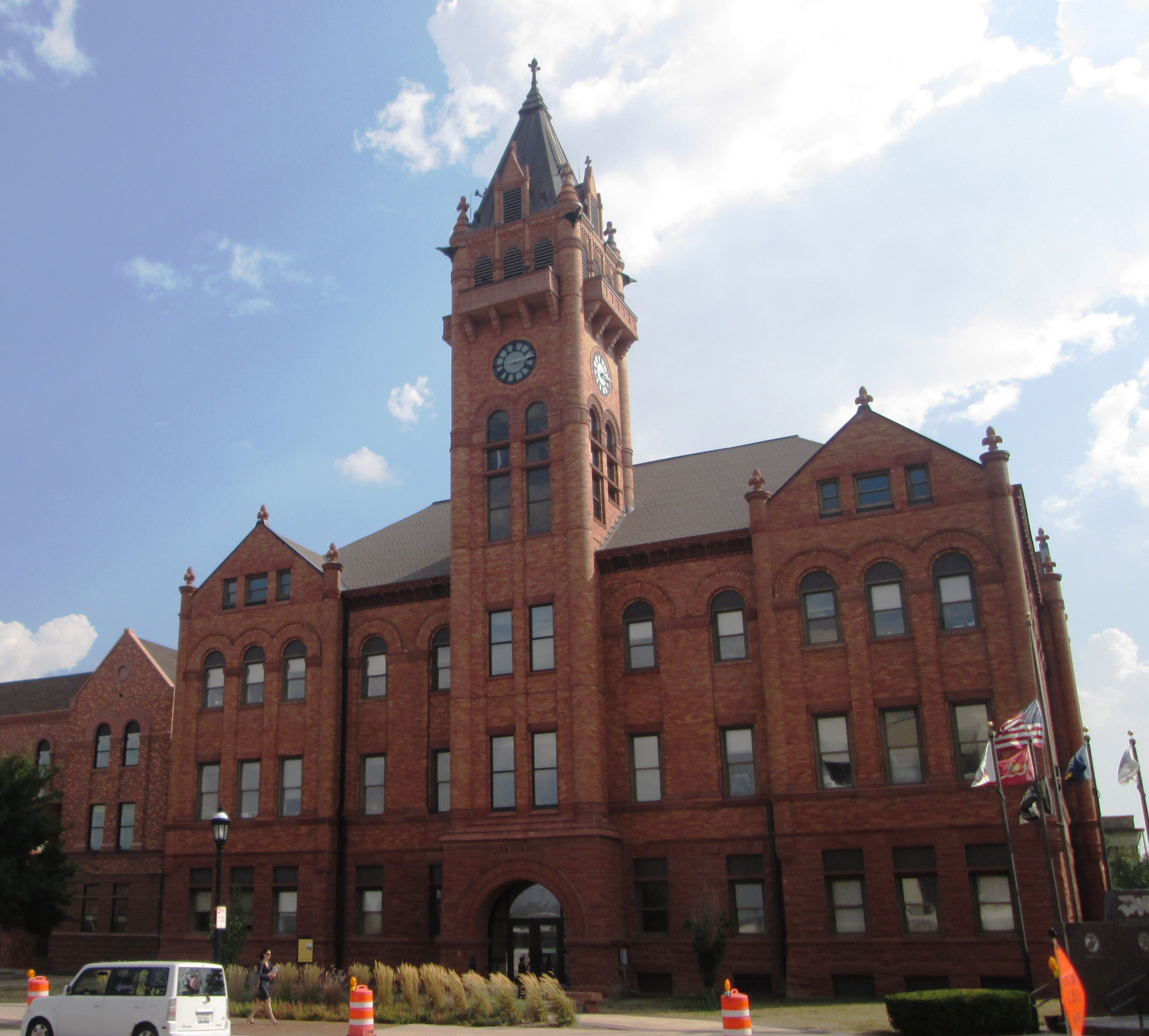
- The Champaign County Courthouse in Urbana

- Location within Illinois

- Illinois' location within the United States
- Coordinates: 40°6′59″N 88°14′36″W
- Country: United States
- State: Illinois
- Region: Central Illinois
- Metro area: Champaign–Urbana Metropolitan
- Incorporated: February 20, 1833
- County seat: Urbana
- Largest city: Champaign

Area
  - Total: 998 sq mi (2,580 km^{2})
  - Land: 996 sq mi (2,580 km^{2})
  - Water: 2.1 sq mi (5.4 km^{2})
  - Rank: 5th largest county in Illinois

Population (2020)
  - Total: 205,865
  - Estimate (2025): 209,972 ▲
  - Density: 207/sq mi (79.8/km^{2})
- Time zone: UTC−6 (Central)
  - Summer (DST): UTC−5 (Central)
- ZIP Code prefixes: 60949, 61801, 61802, 61815, 61816, 61820-61822, 61840, 61843, 61845, 61847, 61849, 61851-61853, 61859, 61862-61864, 61866, 61871-61875, 61877, 61878, 61880
- Area codes: 217/447
- Congressional district: 2nd, 13th, 15th
- Website: champaigncountyil.gov

Elected countywide officials Champaign County, IL
| Office | Name | Party |
|---|---|---|
| County Executive | Steve Summers | Democratic |
| Assessor | Paula Bates | Democratic |
| Auditor | George P. Danos | Democratic |
| County Board Chair | Jennifer Locke | Democratic |
| County Board Majority | Jenny Lokshin | Democratic |
| Circuit Clerk | Susan W. McGrath | Democratic |
| County Clerk & Recorder | Aaron Ammons | Democratic |
| Coroner | Laurie Brauer | Democratic |
| Sheriff | Dustin Heuerman | Democratic |
| State's Attorney | Julia Rietz | Democratic |
| Treasurer | Byron Clark | Democratic |

Champaign County is a county in the U.S. state of Illinois. As of the 2020 Census, its population was 205,865, making it the 10th-most populous county in Illinois. Its county seat is Urbana.

Champaign County is part of the Champaign–Urbana metropolitan area. The twin cities of Urbana and Champaign are the only cities in the county, and it is the home to the University of Illinois Urbana-Champaign.

== History ==
Champaign County was organized in 1833, having been previously a part of Vermilion County. The development of the county was greatly furthered by the arrival of the Chicago Branch of the Illinois Central Railroad, and even more by the establishment of the land-grant university. Later, the county also got an airport and a mass transit district. The northern part of the county experienced an economic and demographic setback with the closing of Chanute Air Force Base in the 1990s. In the 2004 Presidential election, it was one of only 15 of the 102 Illinois counties where John Kerry received a majority of the vote (50.37%).

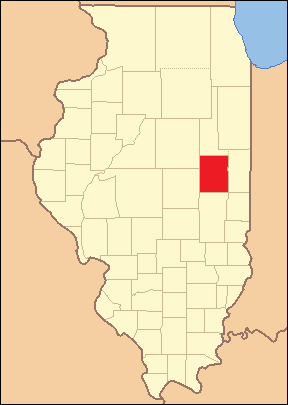
Champaign County at the time of its creation in 1833

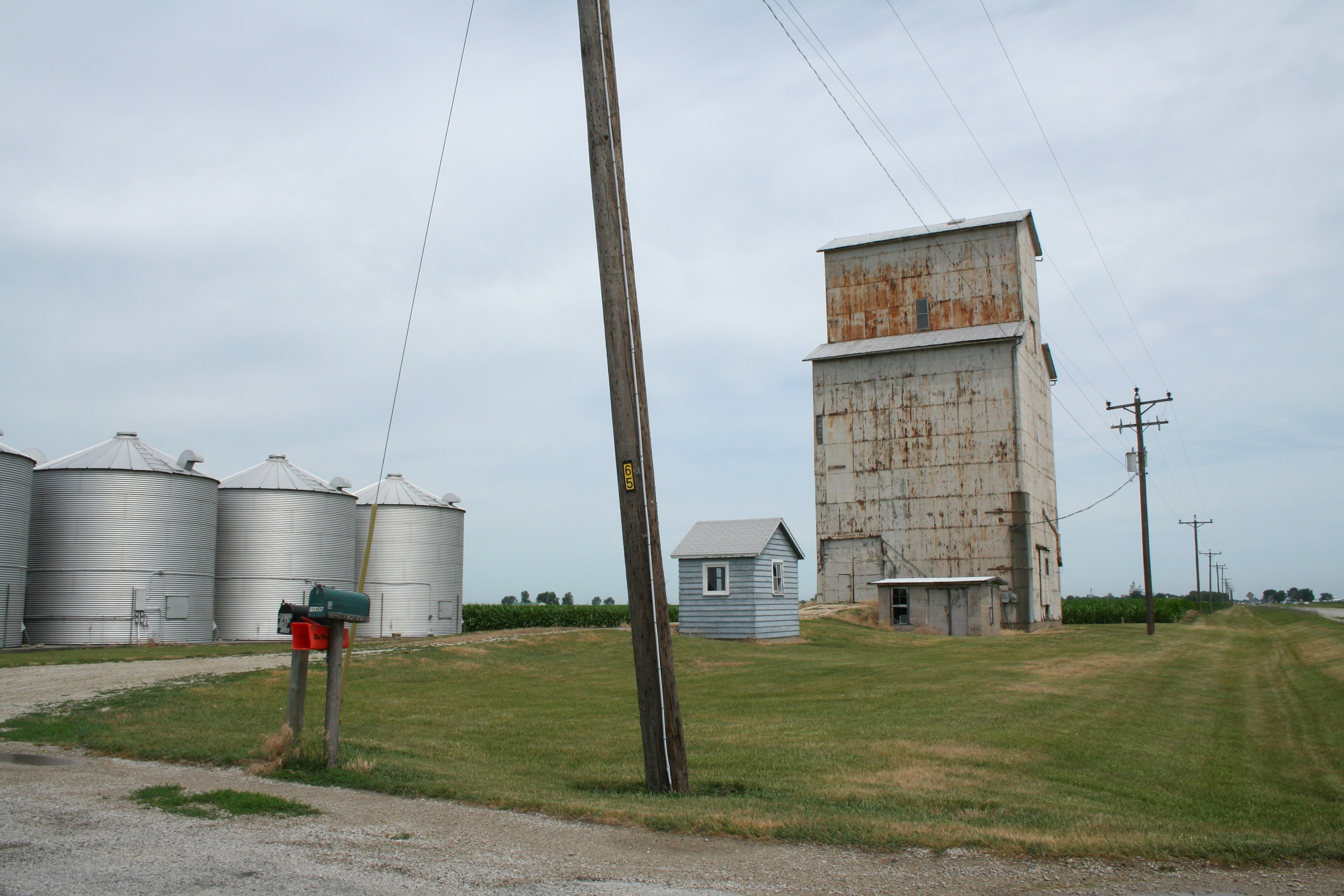
Country grain elevator in Champaign County

== Geography ==
The county is 27 miles wide (east–west) and 36 miles long (north–south). Its area is 998 square miles (2,580 km^{2}), of which 996 square miles (2,580 km^{2}) is land and 2.1 square miles (5.4 km^{2}) (0.2%) is water. It is the fifth-largest county in Illinois by land area.

Because Champaign County is situated on a large and very flat plateau, it had virtually no natural drainage, so that much of the County consisted of wetlands until drainage ditches were built, beginning in the 1870s. This was an example of an upland marsh, which resulted in a high incidence of malaria before the late nineteenth century.

The topography of Champaign County was formed by the Wisconsin glaciation about 20,000 years before the present. Lobes of ice from what is now Lake Michigan crossed the county, creating a deep pile of glacial soil, up to 300 feet thick, topped by numerous moraines forming small, flat watersheds with no outlets.

Champaign County is situated on the divide between the Ohio and Mississippi Rivers. Rivers flow out of Champaign County to the east, west, and south. The Kaskaskia River has its origin to the northwest of Champaign, draining the western side of that City. The Kaskaskia flows toward the southwest, joining the Mississippi south of St. Louis, Missouri.

The Embarras River, on the other hand, drains the south-central portion of Champaign–Urbana, originating in southeastern Champaign and flowing through the experimental fields on the southern part of the campus of the University of Illinois. The Embarras is a tributary to the Wabash River and Ohio River systems. The northeast corner of Champaign, the central portion of the University campus, and the northern part of Urbana are drained by the Boneyard Creek, which flows into the Saline Branch, a tributary of the Vermilion and Wabash rivers.

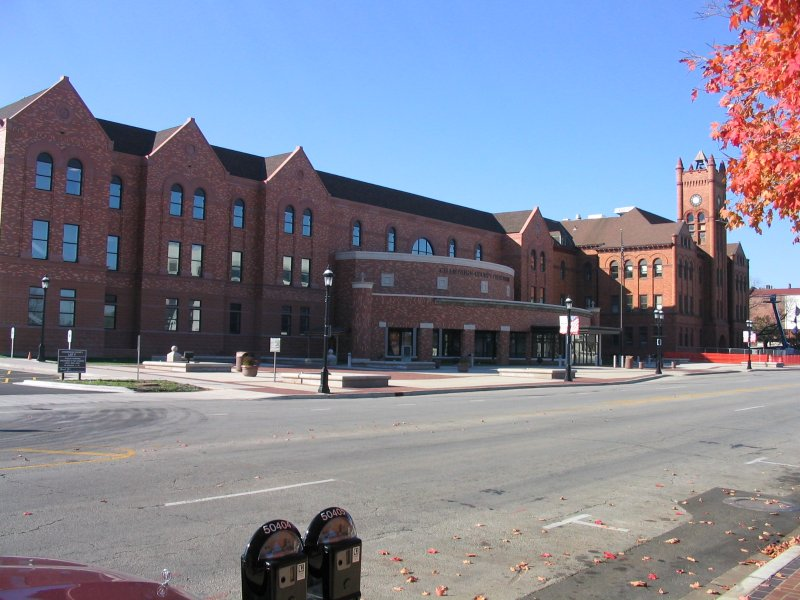
Champaign County Courthouse in Urbana

=== Adjacent counties ===
- McLean County – northwest
- Ford County – north
- Vermilion County – east
- Edgar County – southeast
- Douglas County – south
- Piatt County – west

== Transportation ==
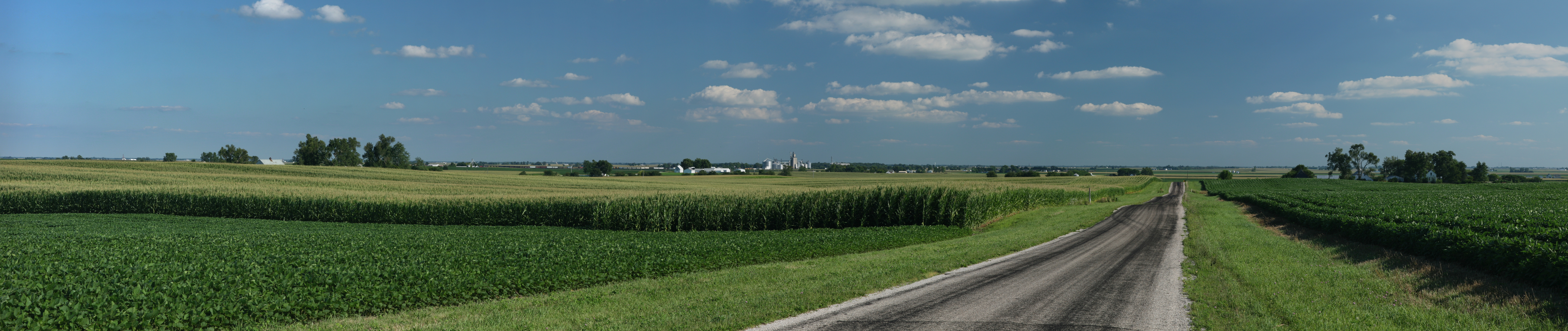
Corn and soybean fields dominate the rural parts of Champaign County

=== Major highways ===
- I-57
- I-72
- I-74
- US 45
- US 136
- US 150
- IL 10
- IL 47
- IL 49
- IL 54 – former US 54
- IL 130

=== Airports ===
The following public-use airports are located in the county:

- University of Illinois Willard Airport (CMI) – Champaign–Urbana
- Rantoul National Aviation Center (Frank Elliott Field) (TIP) – Rantoul
- Frasca Field (C16) – Urbana

=== Rail ===
There are two train stations in Champaign County: The Illinois Terminal in downtown Champaign and Rantoul station in Rantoul. Both stations are served by the Amtrak Illini and Saluki trains, which operate once daily between Chicago and Carbondale. The Illinois Terminal is also served by the City of New Orleans, which operates once daily between Chicago and New Orleans. Amtrak passenger trains in Champaign County use the former Illinois Central mainline, which is owned by the Canadian National Railway and also used by freight trains.

The Norfolk Southern Railway operates two branch lines in Champaign County: the Mansfield Line from Urbana to Mansfield and the Lafayette District from Decatur to Peru, Indiana. Canadian National also operates branch lines from Champaign to Seymour and Rantoul to Dewey. Traffic on the branch lines is limited and consists primarily of freight.

=== Intercity buses ===
Amtrak, Greyhound, and Peoria Charter operate intercity buses from Champaign–Urbana to Chicago, St. Louis, Indianapolis, and other destinations.

=== Public transit ===
The Champaign–Urbana Mass Transit District operates public city buses in Champaign, Urbana, and Savoy.

Champaign County Area Rural Transit System (C-CARTS) provides on-demand transportation services for those living in rural areas of the county. C-CARTS also operates fixed-route local bus service in the village of Rantoul, along with an additional route connecting Rantoul to Champaign–Urbana.

== Renewable energy ==
In August 2018, the Champaign County Board voted to approve solar farms on certain agricultural properties. Solar farms produce photovoltaic energy, which is energy produced by cells that generate electricity when they are hit by light. The board approved solar farms in AG-1 and AG-2 agricultural zoning districts. In order to make the solar farms, developers must obtain a special permit from the county board first. At least seven applications for permits were submitted in the first month.

== Climate and weather ==
Urbana, Illinois

Climate chart (precipitation, max. and min. temperature)
| J | F | M | A | M | J | J | A | S | O | N | D |
| 1.9 32 16 | 2 38 21 | 3.2 49 30 | 3.7 62 40 | 4.8 74 51 | 4.2 83 60 | 4.7 85 64 | 4.4 83 62 | 3.2 78 54 | 2.8 65 43 | 3.5 50 33 | 2.8 37 22 |
- █ Average max. and min. temperatures in °F
- █ Precipitation totals in inches
- Source: The Weather Channel
Metric conversion
| J | F | M | A | M | J | J | A | S | O | N | D |
| 48 0 −9 | 51 3 −6 | 82 9 −1 | 93 17 4 | 122 23 11 | 107 28 16 | 119 29 18 | 111 28 17 | 82 26 12 | 71 18 6 | 88 10 1 | 70 3 −6 |
- █ Average max. and min. temperatures in °C
- █ Precipitation totals in mm

In recent years, average temperatures in the county seat of Urbana have ranged from a low of 16 °F (−9 °C) in January to a high of 85 °F (29 °C) in July, although a record low of −25 °F (−32 °C) was recorded in January 1999 and a record high of 109 °F (43 °C) was recorded in July 1954. Average monthly precipitation ranged from 1.90 inches (48 mm) in January to 4.80 inches (122 mm) in May.

== Demographics ==
2000 census age pyramid for Champaign County with a marked mode for college-aged individuals due to the presence of the University of Illinois.

Historical population
| Census | Pop. | Note | %± |
|---|---|---|---|
| 1840 | 1,475 | | — |
| 1850 | 2,649 | | 79.6% |
| 1860 | 14,629 | | 452.2% |
| 1870 | 32,737 | | 123.8% |
| 1880 | 40,863 | | 24.8% |
| 1890 | 42,159 | | 3.2% |
| 1900 | 47,622 | | 13.0% |
| 1910 | 51,829 | | 8.8% |
| 1920 | 56,959 | | 9.9% |
| 1930 | 64,273 | | 12.8% |
| 1940 | 70,578 | | 9.8% |
| 1950 | 106,100 | | 50.3% |
| 1960 | 132,436 | | 24.8% |
| 1970 | 163,281 | | 23.3% |
| 1980 | 168,392 | | 3.1% |
| 1990 | 173,025 | | 2.8% |
| 2000 | 179,669 | | 3.8% |
| 2010 | 201,081 | | 11.9% |
| 2020 | 205,865 | | 2.4% |
| 2025 (est.) | 209,972 | ▲ | 2.0% |
U.S. Decennial Census; 1790–1960 1900–1990; 1990–2000 2010–2019

=== 2020 census ===
As of the 2020 census, the county had a population of 205,865. The median age was 30.8 years. 19.2% of residents were under the age of 18 and 13.3% of residents were 65 years of age or older. For every 100 females there were 98.4 males, and for every 100 females age 18 and over there were 97.0 males age 18 and over.

As of the 2020 census, the racial makeup of the county was 62.7% White, 13.9% Black or African American, 0.4% American Indian and Alaska Native, 11.9% Asian, <0.1% Native Hawaiian and Pacific Islander, 3.8% from some other race, and 7.3% from two or more races. Hispanic or Latino residents of any race comprised 8.1% of the population.

As of the 2020 census, 84.0% of residents lived in urban areas, while 16.0% lived in rural areas.

As of the 2020 census, there were 84,419 households in the county, of which 24.7% had children under the age of 18 living in them. Of all households, 37.0% were married-couple households, 25.1% were households with a male householder and no spouse or partner present, and 31.0% were households with a female householder and no spouse or partner present. About 34.9% of all households were made up of individuals and 9.4% had someone living alone who was 65 years of age or older.

As of the 2020 census, there were 93,075 housing units, of which 9.3% were vacant. Among occupied housing units, 51.4% were owner-occupied and 48.6% were renter-occupied. The homeowner vacancy rate was 2.0% and the rental vacancy rate was 10.5%.

=== 2010 census ===
As of the 2010 census, there were 201,081 people, 80,665 households, and 42,737 families residing in the county. The population density was 201.8 inhabitants per square mile (77.9/km^{2}). There were 87,569 housing units at an average density of 87.9 per square mile (33.9/km^{2}). The racial makeup of the county was 73.4% white, 12.4% black or African American, 8.9% Asian, 0.3% American Indian, 0.1% Pacific islander, 2.2% from other races, and 2.7% from two or more races. Those of Hispanic or Latino origin made up 5.3% of the population. In terms of ancestry, 23.9% were German, 12.2% were Irish, 11.5% were American, and 8.9% were English.

Of the 80,665 households, 25.8% had children under the age of 18 living with them, 39.7% were married couples living together, 9.9% had a female householder with no husband present, 47.0% were non-families, and 33.2% of all households were made up of individuals. The average household size was 2.29 and the average family size was 2.95. The median age was 28.9 years.

The median income for a household in the county was $45,262 and the median income for a family was $65,785. Males had a median income of $45,823 versus $35,321 for females. The per capita income for the county was $24,553. About 9.7% of families and 20.5% of the population were below the poverty line, including 20.2% of those under age 18 and 8.3% of those age 65 or over.

=== Racial and ethnic composition ===
Champaign County, Illinois – Racial and ethnic composition Note: The US Census treats Hispanic/Latino as an ethnic category. This table excludes Latinos from the racial categories and assigns them to a separate category. Hispanics/Latinos may be of any race.
| Race / Ethnicity (NH = Non-Hispanic) | Pop 1980 | Pop 1990 | Pop 2000 | Pop 2010 | Pop 2020 | % 1980 | % 1990 | % 2000 | % 2010 | % 2020 |
|---|---|---|---|---|---|---|---|---|---|---|
| White alone (NH) | 146,970 | 144,824 | 139,143 | 142,470 | 125,280 | 87.28% | 83.70% | 77.44% | 70.85% | 60.86% |
| Black or African American alone (NH) | 14,492 | 16,534 | 19,881 | 24,553 | 28,215 | 8.61% | 9.96% | 11.07% | 12.21% | 13.71% |
| Native American or Alaska Native alone (NH) | 269 | 429 | 345 | 360 | 279 | 0.16% | 0.25% | 0.19% | 0.18% | 0.14% |
| Asian alone (NH) | 3,286 | 7,819 | 11,553 | 17,879 | 24,420 | 1.95% | 4.52% | 6.43% | 8.89% | 11.86% |
| Pacific Islander alone (NH) | 55 | 76 | 64 | 129 | 60 | 0.03% | 0.04% | 0.04% | 0.06% | 0.03% |
| Other race alone (NH) | 915 | 130 | 325 | 387 | 897 | 0.54% | 0.08% | 0.18% | 0.19% | 0.44% |
| Mixed race or Multiracial (NH) | — | — | 3,155 | 4,696 | 10,048 | — | — | 1.76% | 2.34% | 4.88% |
| Hispanic or Latino (any race) | 2,405 | 1,637 | 5,203 | 10,607 | 16,666 | 1.43% | 0.95% | 2.90% | 5.27% | 8.10% |
| Total | 168,392 | 173,025 | 179,669 | 201,081 | 205,865 | 100.00% | 100.00% | 100.00% | 100.00% | 100.00% |

The Champaign County Economic Development Corporation (CHCEDC) produced a 2009 County Demographic Profile which includes information on the population, labor, housing, cost of living, education, taxes, retail sales, transportation, quality of life, utilities. CHCEDC also conducts labor force studies every two years and labor shed studies every few years.

== Economy ==
Supported by the University of Illinois, through backings such as the Research Park, and Champaign County leaders, the area has shown even more growth in Information Technology, Micro/Nanotechnology, Bio-Imaging, Healthcare, Logistics, Distribution, and Agribusiness in recent years.

In 2010, the top 15 employers in the county are the University of Illinois, Carle Foundation Hospital, Champaign Schools Unit 4, Kraft Heinz, OSF Healthcare, Parkland College, Kirby Foods, Christie Clinic, Champaign County Government, Urbana School District #116, FedEx, Plastipak, Rantoul Foods, Busey Bank, and SuperValu.

== Communities ==
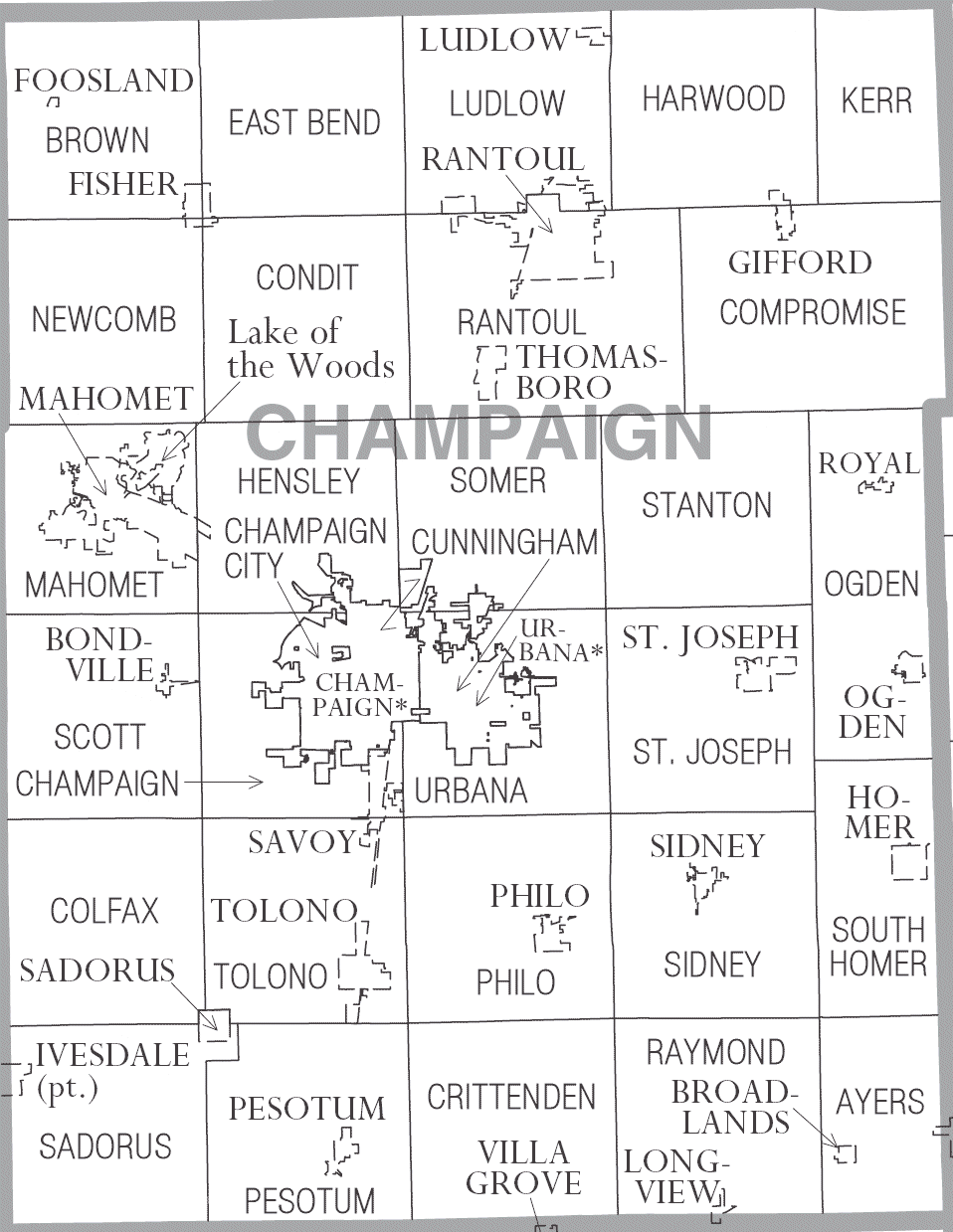
Map of Champaign County

| Community | Community type | Population | Total Area | Water Area | Land Area | Pop. Density |
|---|---|---|---|---|---|---|
| Bondville | village | 388 | 0.25 | 0.00 | 0.25 | 1,545.82 |
| Broadlands | village | 316 | 0.32 | 0.00 | 0.32 | 981.37 |
| Champaign (largest city) | city | 88,302 | 23.14 | 0.15 | 22.99 | 3,800 |
| Dewey | census-designated place | 105 | 0.10 | 0.00 | 0.10 | 1,082.47 |
| Fisher | village | 2,062 | 1.33 | 0.00 | 1.33 | 1,550.38 |
| Foosland | village | 75 | 0.07 | 0.00 | 0.07 | 1,086.96 |
| Gifford | village | 911 | 0.44 | 0.00 | 0.44 | 2,050 |
| Homer | village | 1,073 | 0.98 | 0.00 | 0.98 | 1,094.90 |
| Ivesdale | village | 265 | 0.72 | 0.00 | 0.72 | 370.11 |
| Lake of the Woods | census-designated place | 2,403 | 1.77 | 0.08 | 1.68 | 1,428.66 |
| Longview | village | 112 | 0.25 | 0.00 | 0.25 | 453.44 |
| Ludlow | village | 308 | 0.40 | 0.00 | 0.40 | 775.82 |
| Mahomet | village | 9,434 | 9.79 | 0.07 | 9.72 | 970.38 |
| Ogden | village | 729 | 0.59 | 0.00 | 0.59 | 1,239.80 |
| Penfield | census-designated place | 151 | 0.26 | 0.00 | 0.26 | 587.55 |
| Pesotum | village | 550 | 0.58 | 0.01 | 0.57 | 966.61 |
| Philo | village | 1,392 | 0.83 | 0.00 | 0.83 | 1,679.13 |
| Rantoul | village | 12,371 | 8.59 | 0.10 | 8.49 | 1,457.13 |
| Royal | village | 293 | 0.18 | 0.00 | 0.18 | 1,601.09 |
| Sadorus | village | 402 | 1.03 | 0.00 | 1.03 | 391.43 |
| Savoy | village | 8,857 | 3.30 | 0.07 | 3.23 | 2,739.56 |
| Seymour | census-designated place | 317 | 0.09 | 0.00 | 0.09 | 3,500 |
| Sidney | village | 1,208 | 0.63 | 0.01 | 0.62 | 1,935.90 |
| St. Joseph | village | 3,810 | 2.10 | 0.02 | 2.08 | 1,829.09 |
| Thomasboro | village | 1,034 | 1.00 | 0.00 | 1.00 | 1,034.00 |
| Tolono | village | 3,604 | 2.06 | 0.00 | 2.06 | 1,748.67 |
| Urbana (seat) | city | 38,336 | 11.90 | 0.07 | 11.83 | 3,240.57 |
| Champaign County | county | 205,865 | 998 | 2.1 | 996 | 210 |

=== Townships ===
Township government was adopted on November 8, 1859.

- Ayers
- Brown
- Champaign
- Champaign City
- Colfax
- Compromise
- Condit
- Crittenden
- Cunningham
- East Bend
- Harwood
- Hensley
- Kerr
- Ludlow
- Mahomet
- Newcomb
- Ogden
- Pesotum
- Philo
- Rantoul
- Raymond
- Sadorus
- Scott
- Sidney
- Somer
- South Homer
- St. Joseph
- Stanton
- Tolono
- Urbana

=== Other unincorporated places ===
- Augerville
- Deers
- Dewey
- Dickerson
- Dillsburg
- Flatville
- Gerald
- Giblin
- Leverett
- Lotus
- Mayview
- Mira
- Parkville
- Rising
- Rutherford
- Sellers
- Staley
- Tipton
- Tomlinson
- Wilbur Heights

== Politics ==
Like most of central Illinois, Champaign County was powerfully Republican between the Civil War and the latter portion of the 20th century. From 1856 to 1988, it only supported a Democrat three times, in the national Democratic landslides of 1932, 1936 and 1964. Pockets of Democratic support existed in the cities of Champaign and Urbana, which frequently sent Democrats to the Illinois House of Representatives.

Since 1992, Champaign County has been one of the few Democratic bastions in central Illinois, and has become one of the most Democratic counties in downstate Illinois. Since 2004, it has given a majority of the vote to Democratic candidates due to the county's liberalism, as home to the University of Illinois Urbana-Champaign. This tracks closely with the strong Democratic trend in other counties influenced by college towns since the 1990s. The county's more rural precincts are still heavily Republican, however, they are overpowered by the vote in Champaign and Urbana, which account for over 60 percent of the county's population.

George H. W. Bush in 1988 was the last Republican to carry the county, and Barack Obama's 2008 performance was the best by a Democrat until Joe Biden's 2020 performance surpassed it. In 2024, Democrat Kamala Harris received over 60% of the vote in the county, the highest percentage ever received by a Democratic presidential nominee, despite losing the presidential election. Republican Donald Trump had particularly poor showings in the county, receiving less than 40% of the vote in 2016, 2020, and 2024, his third-worst showing in the state and his worst outside the Chicago area.

United States presidential election results for Champaign County, Illinois
| Year | Republican | | Democratic | | Third party(ies) | |
| Year | No. | % | No. | % | No. | % |
|---|---|---|---|---|---|---|
| 1892 | 5,290 | 50.93% | 4,502 | 43.35% | 594 | 5.72% |
| 1896 | 6,780 | 57.66% | 4,643 | 39.49% | 335 | 2.85% |
| 1900 | 6,660 | 55.06% | 5,015 | 41.46% | 420 | 3.47% |
| 1904 | 6,954 | 61.10% | 3,754 | 32.98% | 674 | 5.92% |
| 1908 | 7,162 | 57.15% | 4,830 | 38.54% | 539 | 4.30% |
| 1912 | 3,220 | 25.62% | 4,454 | 35.43% | 4,896 | 38.95% |
| 1916 | 14,632 | 57.82% | 9,601 | 37.94% | 1,071 | 4.23% |
| 1920 | 15,573 | 71.83% | 5,247 | 24.20% | 861 | 3.97% |
| 1924 | 14,244 | 62.81% | 5,221 | 23.02% | 3,212 | 14.16% |
| 1928 | 19,494 | 68.28% | 8,915 | 31.23% | 141 | 0.49% |
| 1932 | 13,995 | 45.04% | 16,474 | 53.02% | 601 | 1.93% |
| 1936 | 15,808 | 45.77% | 18,203 | 52.71% | 524 | 1.52% |
| 1940 | 20,314 | 53.26% | 17,563 | 46.04% | 267 | 0.70% |
| 1944 | 18,935 | 57.46% | 13,842 | 42.00% | 177 | 0.54% |
| 1948 | 19,156 | 60.88% | 11,572 | 36.78% | 737 | 2.34% |
| 1952 | 27,188 | 65.91% | 13,951 | 33.82% | 112 | 0.27% |
| 1956 | 28,190 | 67.06% | 13,799 | 32.82% | 51 | 0.12% |
| 1960 | 27,793 | 61.16% | 17,115 | 37.66% | 533 | 1.17% |
| 1964 | 22,010 | 46.04% | 25,792 | 53.96% | 0 | 0.00% |
| 1968 | 26,027 | 53.50% | 18,425 | 37.87% | 4,196 | 8.63% |
| 1972 | 33,700 | 57.43% | 24,743 | 42.17% | 236 | 0.40% |
| 1976 | 34,546 | 54.74% | 26,858 | 42.56% | 1,703 | 2.70% |
| 1980 | 33,329 | 50.99% | 21,017 | 32.16% | 11,014 | 16.85% |
| 1984 | 39,224 | 58.61% | 27,266 | 40.74% | 435 | 0.65% |
| 1988 | 33,247 | 52.36% | 29,733 | 46.82% | 519 | 0.82% |
| 1992 | 27,096 | 35.61% | 35,003 | 46.00% | 13,993 | 18.39% |
| 1996 | 28,232 | 42.50% | 32,454 | 48.86% | 5,743 | 8.65% |
| 2000 | 34,645 | 46.64% | 35,515 | 47.81% | 4,125 | 5.55% |
| 2004 | 39,896 | 48.40% | 41,524 | 50.37% | 1,014 | 1.23% |
| 2008 | 33,871 | 40.13% | 48,597 | 57.57% | 1,940 | 2.30% |
| 2012 | 35,312 | 44.92% | 40,831 | 51.94% | 2,466 | 3.14% |
| 2016 | 33,368 | 36.42% | 50,137 | 54.72% | 8,123 | 8.87% |
| 2020 | 35,285 | 36.92% | 57,067 | 59.71% | 3,221 | 3.37% |
| 2024 | 32,965 | 36.52% | 54,314 | 60.18% | 2,977 | 3.30% |

== Education ==
Here is a list of K–12 school districts with territory in the county, no matter how slight, even if the districts have their schools and/or administrative offices in other counties:

K–12:

- Arthur Community Unit School District 305
- Bement Community Unit School District 5
- Champaign Community Unit School District 4
- Fisher Community Unit School District 1
- Gibson City-Melvin-Sibley Community Unit School District 5
- Heritage Community Unit School District 8
- Mahomet-Seymour Community Unit School District 3
- Monticello Community Unit School District 25
- Paxton-Buckley-Loda Community Unit School District 10
- Tolono Community Unit School District 7
- Tuscola Community Unit School District 301
- Urbana School District 116
- Villa Grove Community Unit School District 302

Secondary:

- Armstrong Township High School District 225
- Rantoul Township High School District 193
- St. Joseph-Ogden Community High School District 305

Elementary:

- Armstrong-Ellis Consolidated School District 61
- Gifford Community Consolidated School District 188
- Ludlow Community Consolidated School District 142
- Prairieview-Ogden Community Consolidated School District 197
- Rantoul City School District 137
- St. Joseph Community Consolidated School District 169
- Thomasboro Community Consolidated School District 130

University of Illinois lies in the county.

== Notable people ==
- Henry P. Rusk, dean of the Department of Agriculture at the University of Illinois

== See also ==
- National Register of Historic Places listings in Champaign County, Illinois
