= Ludlow Township =

Ludlow Township may refer to the following townships in the United States:

- Ludlow Township, Champaign County, Illinois
- Ludlow Township, Allamakee County, Iowa
- Ludlow Township, Washington County, Ohio
