= Milmine =

Milmine may refer to:

== People ==
- Douglas Milmine (1921–2017), Bishop of Paraguay
- Georgine Milmine (1871–1950), Canadian-American author and journalist

== Places ==
- Milmine, Illinois
