= Gerald, Illinois =

- Unincorporated community
- Location within Illinois Location within the United States
- Coordinates: 40°16′14″N 87°55′48″W
- Country: United States
- State: Illinois
- County: Champaign
- Elevation: 728 ft (222 m)
- Time zone: UTC-6 (Central (CST))
  - Summer (DST): UTC-5 (CDT)
- Area code: 217
- GNIS feature ID: 422733

Gerald is an unincorporated community in Champaign County, Illinois, United States. Gerald is located along a railroad line 7 miles (11 km) northeast of Royal.
