= Unity Township, Piatt County, Illinois =

Unity Township
- Township
- Location in Piatt County

- Piatt County's location in Illinois
- Coordinates: 39°49′40″N 88°31′42″W
- Country: United States
- State: Illinois
- County: Piatt

Area
  - Total: 48.11 sq mi (124.6 km^{2})
  - Land: 48.11 sq mi (124.6 km^{2})
  - Water: 0 sq mi (0 km^{2}) 0%
- Elevation: 666 ft (203 m)

Population (2010)
  - Estimate (2016): 1,371
  - Density: 29.5/sq mi (11.4/km^{2})
- Time zone: UTC-6 (CST)
  - Summer (DST): UTC-5 (CDT)
- FIPS code: 17-147-76888

Unity Township is a township in Piatt County, Illinois, USA. As of the 2010 census, its population was 1,418 and it contained 666 housing units.

Massive dredge projects in the early 1900s transformed swamplands into a highly productive corn and livestock region.

== Geography ==
According to the 2010 census, the township has a total area of 48.11 square miles (124.6 km^{2}), all land.

=== Cities and towns ===
- Atwood (west half)
- Hammond

=== Unincorporated communities ===
- Pierson

=== Extinct towns ===
- Mackville
- Voorhies

=== Adjacent townships ===
- Bement Township (north)
- Sadorus Township, Champaign County (northeast)
- Garrett Township, Douglas County (east)
- Lowe Township, Moultrie County (south)
- Lovington Township, Moultrie County (southwest)
- Cerro Gordo Township (west)

=== Cemeteries ===
The township contains six cemeteries: Antioch, Hammond, Lake Fork, Long, Mackville, and Moore.

=== Major highways ===
- U.S. Route 36

=== Airports and landing strips ===
- Morris Farm Incorporated Airport

== Demographics ==
Historical population
Census	Pop.	Note	%±
2016 (est.)	1,371
U.S. Decennial Census
