= Crittenden Township, Champaign County, Illinois =

Crittenden Township
- Township
- Location in Champaign County

- Champaign County's location in Illinois
- Coordinates: 39°55′33″N 88°11′14″W
- Country: United States
- State: Illinois
- County: Champaign

Area
  - Total: 36.5 sq mi (95 km^{2})
  - Land: 36.45 sq mi (94.4 km^{2})
  - Water: 0.05 sq mi (0.13 km^{2}) 0.14%
- Elevation: 659 ft (201 m)

Population (2020)
  - Total: 337
  - Density: 9.25/sq mi (3.57/km^{2})
- Time zone: UTC-6 (CST)
  - Summer (DST): UTC-5 (CDT)
- FIPS code: 17-019-17588

Crittenden Township is a township in Champaign County, Illinois, USA. As of the 2020 census, its population was 337 and it contained 134 housing units.

== History ==
Crittenden Township formed from part of Philo Township on an unknown date.

== Geography ==
Crittenden is Township 17 North, Range 9 East of the Third Principal Meridian.

According to the 2010 census, the township has a total area of 36.5 square miles (95 km^{2}), of which 36.45 square miles (94.4 km^{2}) (or 99.86%) is land and 0.05 square miles (0.13 km^{2}) (or 0.14%) is water. The streams of Black Slough and East Branch Embarras River run through this township.

=== Unincorporated towns ===
(This list is based on USGS data and may include former settlements.)

=== Cemeteries ===
The township contains these cemeteries: Calvary at Saint Thomas church, Jessee (Section 33), Kemp, Saint Marys and Shafer (Section 23).

=== Major highways ===
- Illinois State Route 130

== Demographics ==
As of the 2020 census there were 337 people, 109 households, and 75 families residing in the township. The population density was 9.23 inhabitants per square mile (3.56/km^{2}). There were 134 housing units at an average density of 3.67 per square mile (1.42/km^{2}). The racial makeup of the township was 93.18% White, 0.89% African American, 0.00% Native American, 0.00% Asian, 0.00% Pacific Islander, 2.97% from other races, and 2.97% from two or more races. Hispanic or Latino of any race were 0.59% of the population.

There were 109 households, out of which 11.00% had children under the age of 18 living with them, 68.81% were married couples living together, none had a female householder with no spouse present, and 31.19% were non-families. 6.40% of all households were made up of individuals, and none had someone living alone who was 65 years of age or older. The average household size was 2.54 and the average family size was 2.88.

The township's age distribution consisted of 14.1% under the age of 18, 0.0% from 18 to 24, 15.9% from 25 to 44, 39.3% from 45 to 64, and 30.7% who were 65 years of age or older. The median age was 58.3 years. For every 100 females, there were 79.9 males. For every 100 females age 18 and over, there were 85.9 males.

The median income for a household in the township was $118,472, and the median income for a family was $131,307. Males had a median income of $116,806 versus $22,857 for females. The per capita income for the township was $40,039. No families and 19.5% of the population were below the poverty line, including none of those under age 18 and none of those age 65 or over.

Historical population
Census	Pop.	Note	%±
2010	325		—
2020	337		3.7%
U.S. Decennial Census
