= Cerro Gordo Township, Piatt County, Illinois =

Cerro Gordo Township
- Township
- Location in Piatt County

- Piatt County's location in Illinois
- Coordinates: 39°51′N 88°41′W
- Country: United States
- State: Illinois
- County: Piatt
- Established: November 8, 1859

Area
  - Total: 60.26 sq mi (156.1 km^{2})
  - Land: 60.26 sq mi (156.1 km^{2})
  - Water: 0 sq mi (0 km^{2}) 0%
- Elevation: 702 ft (214 m)

Population (2010)
  - Estimate (2016): 1,999
  - Density: 34/sq mi (13/km^{2})
- Time zone: UTC-6 (CST)
  - Summer (DST): UTC-5 (CDT)
- FIPS code: 17-147-12275

Cerro Gordo Township is a township in Piatt County, Illinois, USA. As of the 2010 census, its population was 2,046 and it contained 874 housing units.

== Geography ==
According to the 2010 census, the township has a total area of 60.26 square miles (156.1 km^{2}), all land.

=== Cities and towns ===
- Cerro Gordo

=== Unincorporated towns ===
- La Place
- Milmine

=== Extinct towns ===
- Burrowsville
- Lintner

=== Adjacent townships ===
- Willow Branch Township (north)
- Bement Township (northeast)
- Unity Township (east)
- Lovington Township, Moultrie County (south)
- Dora Township, Moultrie County (southwest)
- Long Creek Township, Macon County (west)
- Oakley Township, Macon County (west)

=== Cemeteries ===
The township contains four cemeteries: Cerro Gordo, Clover, County and LaPlace.

=== Major highways ===
- U.S. Route 36
- Illinois Route 32
- Illinois Route 105

=== Airports and landing strips ===
- White Landing Strip

== Demographics ==
Historical population
Census	Pop.	Note	%±
2016 (est.)	1,999
U.S. Decennial Census

=== Race ===
Cerro Gordo is very predominantly white, with the remainder being either Hispanic, of two or more races, or of 'other'.

=== Age ===
Cerro Gordo Township is approximately 58% between the ages of 18 and 64, with the average age being 41.2.
