= Ludlow Township, Champaign County, Illinois =

Ludlow Township
- Township
- Location in Champaign County

- Champaign County's location in Illinois
- Coordinates: 40°21′10″N 88°10′00″W
- Country: United States
- State: Illinois
- County: Champaign
- Established: November 8, 1859

Area
  - Total: 36.65 sq mi (94.9 km^{2})
  - Land: 36.62 sq mi (94.8 km^{2})
  - Water: 0.03 sq mi (0.078 km^{2}) 0.08%
- Elevation: 764 ft (233 m)

Population (2020)
  - Total: 4,077
  - Density: 111.3/sq mi (42.99/km^{2})
- Time zone: UTC-6 (CST)
  - Summer (DST): UTC-5 (CDT)
- FIPS code: 17-019-45187

Ludlow Township is a township in Champaign County, Illinois, USA. As of the 2020 census, its population was 4,077 and it contained 2,078 housing units.

== History ==
Ludlow Township changed its name from Pera Township in March, 1867.

== Geography ==
Ludlow is Township 22 North, Range 9 East of the Third Principal Meridian.

According to the 2010 census, the township has a total area of 36.65 square miles (94.9 km^{2}), of which 36.62 square miles (94.8 km^{2}) (or 99.92%) is land and 0.03 square miles (0.078 km^{2}) (or 0.08%) is water.

=== Cities and towns ===
- Ludlow
- Rantoul (north quarter)

=== Unincorporated towns ===
- Tomlinson

(This list is based on USGS data and may include former settlements.)

=== Cemeteries ===
The township contains five cemeteries: Ludlow, Maplewood, Mennonite, Miller and Mount Hope.

=== Major highways ===
- Interstate 57
- U.S. Route 45
- U.S. Route 136

== Demographics ==
As of the 2020 census there were 4,077 people, 2,017 households, and 1,148 families residing in the township. The population density was 111.23 inhabitants per square mile (42.95/km^{2}). There were 2,078 housing units at an average density of 56.69 per square mile (21.89/km^{2}). The racial makeup of the township was 63.40% White, 17.37% African American, 0.44% Native American, 1.23% Asian, 0.00% Pacific Islander, 10.06% from other races, and 7.51% from two or more races. Hispanic or Latino of any race were 15.01% of the population.

There were 2,017 households, out of which 24.40% had children under the age of 18 living with them, 37.13% were married couples living together, 16.81% had a female householder with no spouse present, and 43.08% were non-families. 38.50% of all households were made up of individuals, and 16.30% had someone living alone who was 65 years of age or older. The average household size was 2.09 and the average family size was 2.79.

The township's age distribution consisted of 13.7% under the age of 18, 9.5% from 18 to 24, 33.1% from 25 to 44, 24.7% from 45 to 64, and 18.9% who were 65 years of age or older. The median age was 40.5 years. For every 100 females, there were 93.2 males. For every 100 females age 18 and over, there were 87.1 males.

The median income for a household in the township was $40,174, and the median income for a family was $62,842. Males had a median income of $29,095 versus $27,768 for females. The per capita income for the township was $26,254. About 12.5% of families and 12.7% of the population were below the poverty line, including 26.3% of those under age 18 and 8.4% of those age 65 or over.

Historical population
| Census | Pop. | Note | %± |
|---|---|---|---|
| 2010 | 4,278 | | — |
| 2020 | 4,077 | | −4.7% |
U.S. Decennial Census
