= Mayview, Illinois =

- Unincorporated community
- Location within Illinois Location within the United States
- Coordinates: 40°06′48″N 88°06′37″W
- Country: United States
- State: Illinois
- County: Champaign
- Elevation: 686 ft (209 m)
- Time zone: UTC-6 (Central (CST))
  - Summer (DST): UTC-5 (CDT)
- Area code: 217
- GNIS feature ID: 413168

Mayview is an unincorporated community in Champaign County, Illinois, United States. Mayview is located along U.S. Route 150, east of Urbana.
