= Sidney Township, Champaign County, Illinois =

Sidney Township
- Township
- Location in Champaign County

- Champaign County's location in Illinois
- Coordinates: 40°00′38″N 88°03′59″W
- Country: United States
- State: Illinois
- County: Champaign
- Established: November 8, 1859

Area
  - Total: 36.44 sq mi (94.4 km^{2})
  - Land: 36.32 sq mi (94.1 km^{2})
  - Water: 0.12 sq mi (0.31 km^{2}) 0.33%
- Elevation: 669 ft (204 m)

Population (2020)
  - Total: 1,709
  - Density: 47.05/sq mi (18.17/km^{2})
- Time zone: UTC-6 (CST)
  - Summer (DST): UTC-5 (CDT)
- FIPS code: 17-019-69888

Sidney Township is a township in Champaign County, Illinois, USA. As of the 2020 census, its population was 1,709 and it contained 723 housing units.

== Geography ==
Sidney is Township 18 North, Range 10 East of the Third Principal Meridian.

In 1881 the Wabash railroad built a spur from Sidney to Urbana on the route of a vanished 1838 unpaved dirt road going from Paris in Edgar County to Urbana. In 1854 the road was part of the mail stage route from Urbana to Vincennes, Indiana. The road disappeared when township roads on section lines were established in 1860.

According to the 2010 census, the township has a total area of 36.44 square miles (94.4 km^{2}), of which 36.32 square miles (94.1 km^{2}) (or 99.67%) is land and 0.12 square miles (0.31 km^{2}) (or 0.33%) is water. The stream of Rush Branch runs through this township. The Salt Fork of the Vermilion River winds its way through the northern sections of the township. Frito-Lay has a large corn handling facility located in section 12 (40°1′50″N 88°1′34″W) along the county highway between Sidney and Homer; it sits near a major Norfolk Southern east–west rail line.

Map of Sidney Township

=== Cities and towns ===
- Sidney

=== Unincorporated towns ===
- Rutherford

(This list is based on USGS data and may include former settlements.)

=== Cemeteries ===
The township contains six cemeteries: Bliss (Section 11), Boys Family, Brownfield, Brumley, Lynn Grove (Section 31) and Mount Hope.

The historic 1867 Umbanhower Cemetery was in Section 1.

=== Grain Elevators ===
Block elevators. Two elevators (Section 33) were built along the Chicago and Eastern Illinois—Union Pacific railroad. Isaac Cole Grain and Coal operated a wooden elevator there in 1913.

Deers elevator (Section 6) was built along the Wabash—Norfolk Southern railroad spur running between Urbana and Sidney 1881−1990, and was operated by Dryer and Burt Grain and Coal in 1913. The elevator has been demolished. Deers Station depot had a post office 1887−1913 at the southeast intersection of county roads 1200N and 1800E, that was also demolished. The railroad spur and adjacent siding were abandoned and the tracks taken up in the 1990s.

Sidney elevator (Section 16) was built along the Wabash—Norfolk Southern railroad, and was operated by Isaac Cole Grain and Coal in 1913; Sidney Grain Company in 1929.

=== Mills ===
George Akers built a water-powered mill on the Salt Fork in Section 2 in the 1830s. Remains of the mill were on the property owned by James Michael West after 1854.

=== Airports and landing strips ===
- Justus Airport

== Demographics ==
As of the 2020 census there were 1,709 people, 653 households, and 485 families residing in the township. The population density was 46.90 inhabitants per square mile (18.11/km^{2}). There were 723 housing units at an average density of 19.84 per square mile (7.66/km^{2}). The racial makeup of the township was 92.80% White, 0.53% African American, 0.00% Native American, 0.47% Asian, 0.00% Pacific Islander, 0.82% from other races, and 5.38% from two or more races. Hispanic or Latino of any race were 1.99% of the population.

There were 653 households, out of which 34.80% had children under the age of 18 living with them, 61.41% were married couples living together, 6.58% had a female householder with no spouse present, and 25.73% were non-families. 16.40% of all households were made up of individuals, and 7.50% had someone living alone who was 65 years of age or older. The average household size was 2.82 and the average family size was 3.25.

The township's age distribution consisted of 29.7% under the age of 18, 6.4% from 18 to 24, 20.1% from 25 to 44, 31.2% from 45 to 64, and 12.8% who were 65 years of age or older. The median age was 37.9 years. For every 100 females, there were 100.3 males. For every 100 females age 18 and over, there were 98.0 males.

The median income for a household in the township was $86,298, and the median income for a family was $97,083. Males had a median income of $55,294 versus $49,904 for females. The per capita income for the township was $36,495. About 1.4% of families and 2.9% of the population were below the poverty line, including 2.2% of those under age 18 and none of those age 65 or over.

Historical population
Census	Pop.	Note	%±
2010	1,733		—
2020	1,709		−1.4%
U.S. Decennial Census
