= Willow Branch Township, Piatt County, Illinois =

Willow Branch Township
- Township
- Location in Piatt County

- Piatt County's location in Illinois
- Coordinates: 39°59′N 88°41′W
- Country: United States
- State: Illinois
- County: Piatt

Area
  - Total: 67.39 sq mi (174.5 km^{2})
  - Land: 67.33 sq mi (174.4 km^{2})
  - Water: 0.06 sq mi (0.16 km^{2}) 0.09%
- Elevation: 630 ft (192 m)

Population (2010)
  - Estimate (2016): 830
  - Density: 12.5/sq mi (4.8/km^{2})
- Time zone: UTC-6 (CST)
  - Summer (DST): UTC-5 (CDT)
- FIPS code: 17-147-81906

Willow Branch Township is a township in Piatt County, Illinois, USA. As of the 2010 census, its population was 839 and it contained 355 housing units.

== History ==
Willow Branch Township changed its name from Liberty Township sometime around 1860.

The area is the site of a major archaeological site of the University of Illinois along the nearby Sangamon River of the homestead of Ira Sarlls, an early pioneer farmer to the area from New York

== Geography ==
According to the 2010 census, the township has a total area of 67.39 square miles (174.5 km^{2}), of which 67.33 square miles (174.4 km^{2}) (or 99.91%) is land and 0.06 square miles (0.16 km^{2}) (or 0.09%) is water. The streams of Wildcat Creek and Willow Branch run through this township. Both streams are tributaries of the Sangamon River which runs from northeast to southwest through the township.

Willow Branch is part of Townships 17 and 18 North, Range 4 and 5 East of the Third Principal Meridian.

Robert Allerton Park, owned by the University of Illinois, is located in parts of Sections 20, 21, 22, 27, 28, 29, 30; T.18 N., R.5 E.

=== Cities and towns ===
- Cisco

=== Extinct towns ===
- Amenia

=== Adjacent townships ===
- Goose Creek Township (north)
- Monticello Township (east)
- Bement Township (southeast)
- Cerro Gordo Township (south)
- Oakley Township, Macon County (southwest)
- Friends Creek Township, Macon County (west)
- Whitmore Township, Macon County (west)
- Nixon Township, DeWitt County (northwest)

=== Cemeteries ===
The township contains eight cemeteries: Ater, Cronninger, Pioneer, Stringtown, Van Meter, Warfield Family, West France and Willow Branch. The Sheppard Family Cemetery and West Family Cemetery (both no longer used) are located in Robert Allerton Park.

=== Grain elevators ===
Amenia—Allerton Station elevator (Section 17; T. 18 N., R. 5 E.) was built along the Decatur–Monticello–Champaign—Illinois Central railroad on the Allerton farm Piatt North No. 1 in 1912. The wooden elevator burned 15 April 2015. Two concrete silos remain on the site.

=== Schools ===
Rural schools in T.18 N., R.5 E. included Excelsior School No. 66 (Section 7), Shady Nook School No.4, later No. 67 (Section 20), Stringtown School No. 65 (Section 8), Wildcat School No. 2, later No. 68 (Section 15), Willow Branch School No. 70 (Section 32).

The rural schools were all demolished or converted to residences.

=== Major highways ===
- Interstate 72
- Illinois State Route 48

=== Airports and landing strips ===
- Norfleet Farms Airport

== Demographics ==
Historical population
Census	Pop.	Note	%±
2016 (est.)	830
U.S. Decennial Census
