= Pierson, Illinois =

Pierson
- Unincorporated community
- Location within Illinois
- Coordinates: 39°47′53″N 088°31′42″W
- Country: United States
- State: Illinois
- County: Piatt
- Township: Unity
- Elevation: 676 ft (206 m)
- ZIP code: 61929
- GNIS feature ID: 0415648

Pierson (also known as Pierson Station) is an unincorporated community in Unity Township, Piatt County, Illinois, United States.

== Geography ==
Pierson is located at 39°47′53″N 088°31′42″W at an elevation of 676 feet.
