= Milmine, Illinois =

Milmine
- Unincorporated community
- Location within Illinois
- Coordinates: 39°54′27″N 088°39′01″W
- Country: United States
- State: Illinois
- County: Piatt
- Township: Cerro Gordo
- Elevation: 712 ft (217 m)
- ZIP code: 61855
- GNIS feature ID: 0413629

Milmine is an unincorporated community in Cerro Gordo Township, Piatt County, Illinois, United States.

== Geography ==
Milmine is located at 39°54′27″N 088°39′01″W at an elevation of 712 feet.
