= Ludlow, Illinois =

Ludlow
- Village
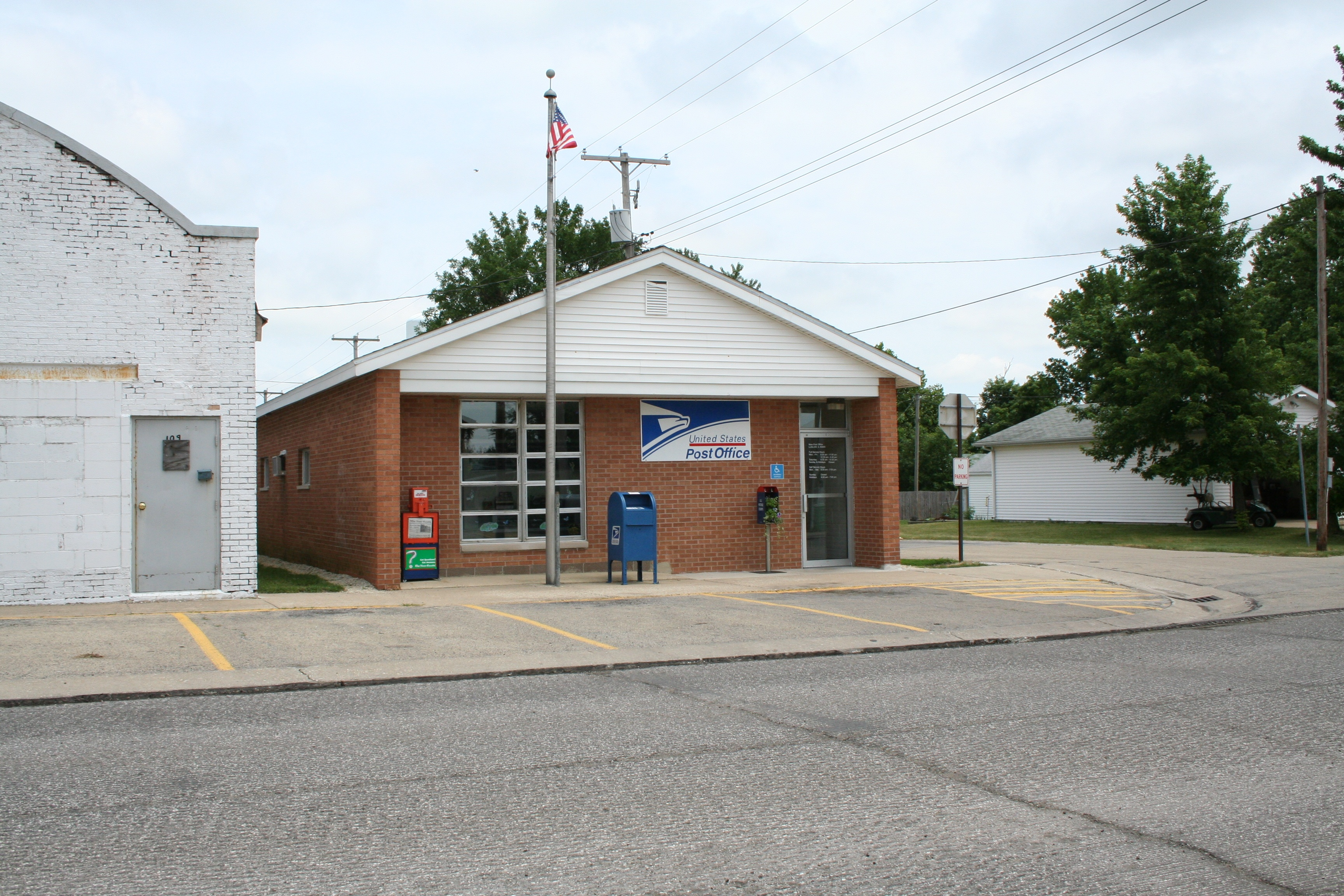
- Ludlow Post Office

- Location of Ludlow in Champaign County, Illinois.

- Location within Champaign County Ludlow (Illinois)
- Coordinates: 40°23′08″N 88°07′27″W
- Country: United States
- State: Illinois
- County: Champaign

Government
  - Mayor: Steve Thomas

Area
  - Total: 0.40 sq mi (1.03 km^{2})
  - Land: 0.40 sq mi (1.03 km^{2})
  - Water: 0 sq mi (0.00 km^{2})
- Elevation: 771 ft (235 m)

Population (2020)
  - Total: 308
  - Density: 775/sq mi (299.2/km^{2})
- Time zone: UTC-6 (CST)
  - Summer (DST): UTC-5 (CDT)
- Zip code: 60949
- Area code: 217
- FIPS code: 17-45174
- GNIS feature ID: 2399200
- Website: https://villageofludlow.com/home

Ludlow is a village in Champaign County, Illinois, United States. The population was 308 at the 2020 census.

== History ==
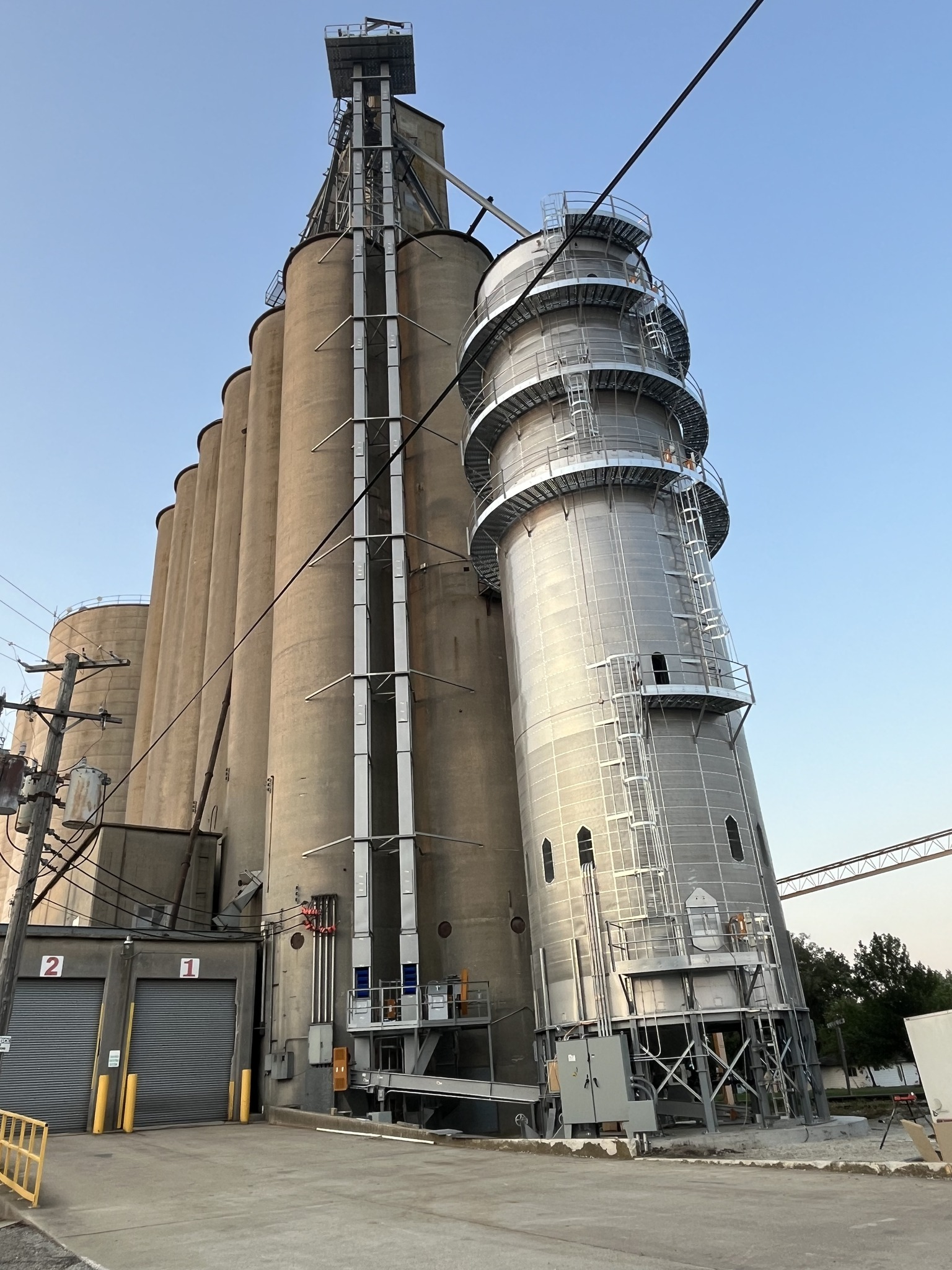
Ludlow, Illinois grain elevators

Once named Pera Station, Ludlow, a prairie town in northern Champaign County, Illinois, has a rich history dating back to its days as a stop on the Illinois Central Railroad. This settlement played a crucial role in connecting the region's rural communities and facilitating trade between Urbana and Loda. The village was renamed Ludlow in 1868 after James D. Ludlow, a shareholder in the Illinois Central Railroad. The construction of the railroad brought about a significant influx of settlers to Ludlow, many were attracted by the area's fertile soil and vast prairies. The early years saw rapid growth, with James Ludlow donating land to the village for its expansion. The village grew to include two churches, becoming a hub for community gatherings and worship. The village continued to expand including a hardware store, as well as two blacksmith shops were established. Additionally, the "Ludlow Co-Op Elevator Company" was formed in 1904, the company has continued to serve the community and has since grown, expanding to 11 locations.

In 1949, a fire department was formed to service the residents of Ludlow, known as “Ludlow Fire Protection District". In the late 1970s, Ludlow received significant funding after an arson attack. This funding assisted in critical infrastructure upgrades, which had a lasting impact on the town's development and growth. The funds were used to renovate roads, upgrade drainage systems, and install curbs, among other projects including, building a new community center. Ludlow continues to grow and evolve, with police services and a local post office.

== Geography ==
According to the 2021 census gazetteer files, Ludlow has a total area of 0.40 square miles (1.04 km^{2}), all land.

The small community of Ludlow is approximately 117 miles from Chicago, Illinois. An average of 6 miles from its closest cities or villages, those being Paxton, Illinois, and Rantoul, Illinois. Ludlow is also 21 miles from the University of Illinois Urbana-Champaign.

=== Major highways ===
- US Route 45
- Interstate 57

== Demographics ==
Historical population
| Census | Pop. | Note | %± |
|---|---|---|---|
| 1880 | 293 | | — |
| 1890 | 298 | | 1.7% |
| 1900 | 306 | | 2.7% |
| 1910 | 305 | | −0.3% |
| 1920 | 343 | | 12.5% |
| 1930 | 310 | | −9.6% |
| 1940 | 318 | | 2.6% |
| 1950 | 475 | | 49.4% |
| 1960 | 460 | | −3.2% |
| 1970 | 531 | | 15.4% |
| 1980 | 397 | | −25.2% |
| 1990 | 323 | | −18.6% |
| 2000 | 324 | | 0.3% |
| 2010 | 371 | | 14.5% |
| 2020 | 308 | | −17.0% |
U.S. Decennial Census

As of the 2020 census there were 308 people, 173 households, and 80 families residing in the village. The population density was 775.82 inhabitants per square mile (299.55/km^{2}). There were 153 housing units at an average density of 385.39 per square mile (148.80/km^{2}). The racial makeup of the village was 75.32% White, 2.60% African American, 1.30% Asian, 0.00% Pacific Islander, 10.71% from other races, and 10.06% from two or more races. Hispanic or Latino of any race were 14.29% of the population.

There were 173 households, out of which 26.6% had children under the age of 18 living with them, 27.17% were married couples living together, 2.89% had a female householder with no husband present, and 53.76% were non-families. 36.99% of all households were made up of individuals, and 13.29% had someone living alone who was 65 years of age or older. The average household size was 3.31 and the average family size was 2.46.

The village's age distribution consisted of 18.1% under the age of 18, 17.8% from 18 to 24, 24.7% from 25 to 44, 30.6% from 45 to 64, and 8.9% who were 65 years of age or older. The median age was 37.7 years. For every 100 females, there were 94.5 males. For every 100 females age 18 and over, there were 110.2 males.

The median income for a household in the village was $47,679, and the median income for a family was $60,625. Males had a median income of $45,417 versus $20,000 for females. The per capita income for the village was $20,027. About 15.0% of families and 26.4% of the population were below the poverty line, including 37.5% of those under age 18 and none of those age 65 or over.

== Education ==
Ludlow is served by one school, Ludlow Grade School, a public elementary school that provides education to the local children from kindergarten through 8th grade. Students in grades 9th-12th attend Rantoul High School, which is located in the nearby village of Rantoul.

The current principal of Ludlow Grade School is Jeff Graham.

== Government ==
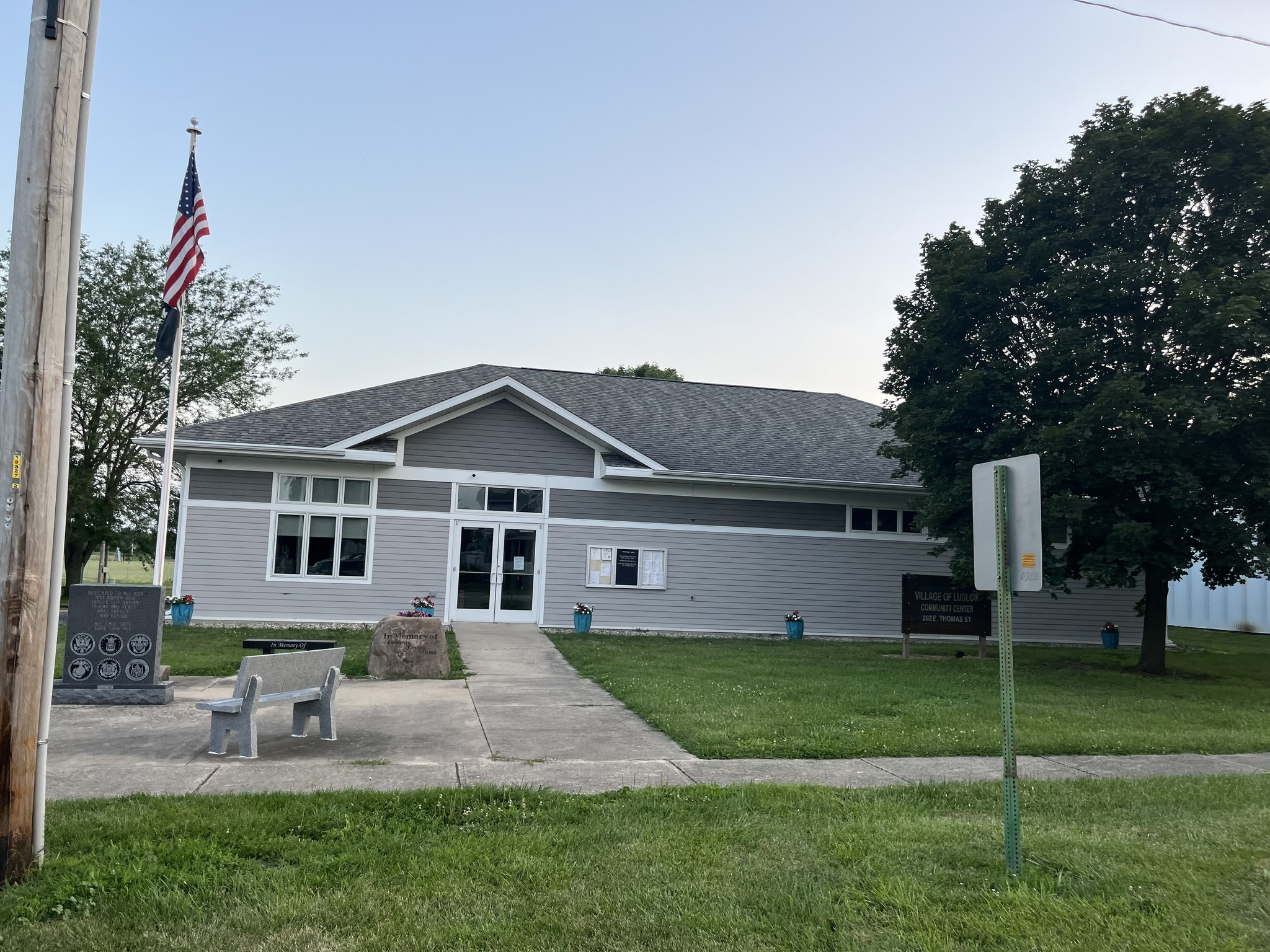
The Ludlow Community Center

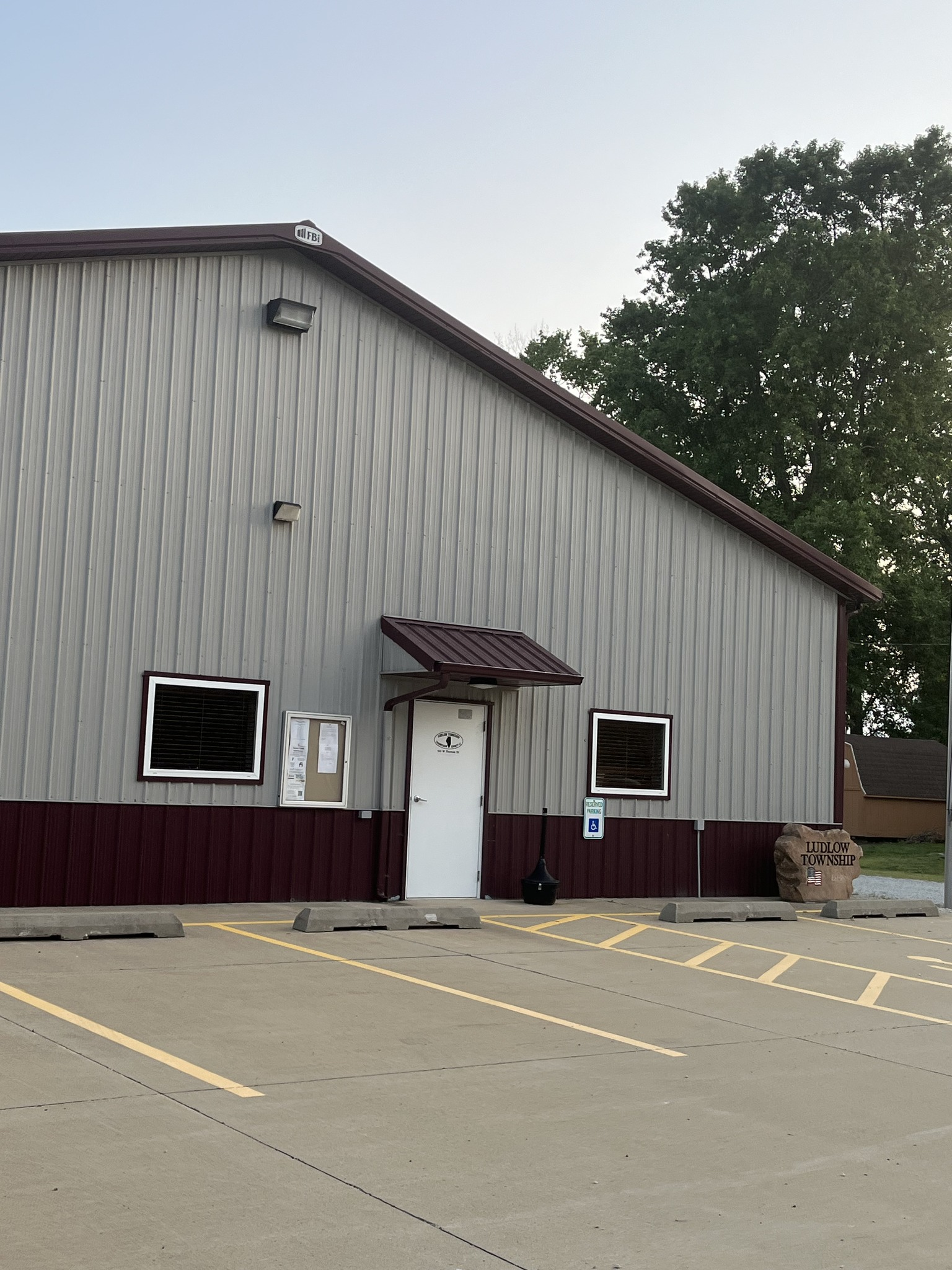
Ludlow Township

Ludlow's government officials are as such:

Current mayor is Steve Thomas.

Village Clerk & Treasurer is Dawn Good-Adwell.

Ludlow Board of Trustees- Brian B., John C., Tom F., Miranda M., Paxton P., and Marsha S.

== Cultural references ==
The town of Ludlow is identified as the first site of an invasion of giant locusts in the 1957 movie Beginning of the End.
