= Mira, Illinois =

- Unincorporated community
- Location within Illinois Location within the United States
- Coordinates: 40°05′02″N 88°09′44″W
- Country: United States
- State: Illinois
- County: Champaign
- Elevation: 696 ft (212 m)
- Time zone: UTC-6 (Central (CST))
  - Summer (DST): UTC-5 (CDT)
- Area code: 217
- GNIS feature ID: 422989

Mira (or Myra Station) is a locale and former rail depot in Champaign County, Illinois, United States. It was a stop on a branch of the Wabash Railroad with a grain elevator, but the elevator was removed in 1986, leaving the name behind but no train station. It was named for a 'prominent resident of [the] vicinity', Myra Silver, who was later killed at the station.

== History ==
Myra Station elevator (Section 22, Urbana Township) was built along the Wabash—Norfolk Southern railroad spur running between Urbana and Sidney 1881−1990. The elevator was operated by Jacob G. Holterman until December 1903 when it was taken over by Alfred Edmond Silver as Silver Elevator Company. The concrete elevator at the intersection of Illinois Route 130 and East Windsor Road was demolished in 1986. Myra Station depot on the opposite side of the tracks was named for Myra Silver (1834−1903) who owned a farm south of the depot in Section 26. On 30 November 1903 she was killed by a train approaching from the southeast as she was crossing the tracks to board at the station. The accident was described in some detail by one of the local newspapers. The railroad spur was abandoned and the tracks taken up in the 1990s.

The variant spelling Mira first appeared on maps of Champaign County in the early 1900s and has persisted on some maps and highway signs, although it is not justified by local usage. In addition to a memorial to Myra Silver set up by a resident near the intersection, there is a Myra Ridge subdivision nearby.
