= Colfax Township, Champaign County, Illinois =

Colfax Township
- Township
- Location in Champaign County

- Champaign County's location in Illinois
- Coordinates: 40°01′07″N 88°23′57″W
- Country: United States
- State: Illinois
- County: Champaign

Area
  - Total: 36.3 sq mi (94 km^{2})
  - Land: 36.29 sq mi (94.0 km^{2})
  - Water: 0.01 sq mi (0.026 km^{2}) 0.03%
- Elevation: 690 ft (210 m)

Population (2020)
  - Total: 219
  - Density: 6.03/sq mi (2.33/km^{2})
- Time zone: UTC-6 (CST)
  - Summer (DST): UTC-5 (CDT)
- FIPS code: 17-019-15482

Colfax Township is a township in Champaign County, Illinois, USA. As of the 2020 census, its population was 219 and it contained 109 housing units.

== History ==
Colfax Township formed from Tolono Township in 1869.

== Geography ==
Colfax is Township 18 North, Range 7 East of the Third Principal Meridian.

According to the 2010 census, the township has a total area of 36.3 square miles (94 km^{2}), of which 36.29 square miles (94.0 km^{2}) (or 99.97%) is land and 0.01 square miles (0.026 km^{2}) (or 0.03%) is water.

Blue Mound, a glacial kame in Section 7, is the highest point in the township. A pole barn and a few trees are all that remain of the farmstead that once occupied the site.

=== Unincorporated towns ===
- Giblin

(This list is based on USGS data and may include former settlements.)

=== Cemeteries ===
The township contains these cemeteries: Craw (Section 25), Davis Memorial, Dunn and Saint Boniface (Section 2).

== Demographics ==
As of the 2020 census there were 219 people, 37 households, and 6 families residing in the township. The population density was 6.04 inhabitants per square mile (2.33/km^{2}). There were 109 housing units at an average density of 3.01 per square mile (1.16/km^{2}). The racial makeup of the township was 87.67% White, 0.00% African American, 0.00% Native American, 3.65% Asian, 0.00% Pacific Islander, 0.46% from other races, and 8.22% from two or more races. Hispanic or Latino of any race were 2.28% of the population.

There were 37 households, out of which 0.00% had children under the age of 18 living with them, 16.22% were married couples living together, none had a female householder with no spouse present, and 83.78% were non-families. 83.80% of all households were made up of individuals, and none had someone living alone who was 65 years of age or older. The average household size was 1.97 and the average family size was 7.00.

The township's age distribution consisted of 0.0% under the age of 18, 21.9% from 18 to 24, 0% from 25 to 44, 60.2% from 45 to 64, and 17.8% who were 65 years of age or older. The median age was 53.5 years. For every 100 females, there were 43.1 males. For every 100 females age 18 and over, there were 43.1 males.

Historical population
| Census | Pop. | Note | %± |
|---|---|---|---|
| 2010 | 266 | | — |
| 2020 | 219 | | −17.7% |
U.S. Decennial Census
