= Giblin, Illinois =

- Unincorporated community
- Location within Illinois Location within the United States
- Coordinates: 40°01′03″N 88°24′24″W
- Country: United States
- State: Illinois
- County: Champaign
- Elevation: 692 ft (211 m)
- Time zone: UTC-6 (Central (CST))
  - Summer (DST): UTC-5 (CDT)
- Area code: 217
- GNIS feature ID: 1725549

Giblin was an unincorporated rural community in Champaign County, Illinois, United States. Giblin is 9 miles (14 km) east of Monticello.

Though no longer extant, the community once had a general store with a post office, house, and a township hall. It only lasted for at most 40 years. The post office was opened in 1892, and closed in 1903 with the advent of rural mail delivery.
