= Wilbur Heights, Illinois =

- Unincorporated community
- Location within Illinois Location within the United States
- Coordinates: 40°08′33″N 88°14′08″W
- Country: United States
- State: Illinois
- County: Champaign
- Elevation: 745 ft (227 m)
- Time zone: UTC-6 (Central (CST))
  - Summer (DST): UTC-5 (CDT)
- Zip: 61888
- Area code: 217
- GNIS feature ID: 421138

Wilbur Heights is an unincorporated community in Champaign County, Illinois, United States. Wilbur Heights is a northern suburb of Champaign and Urbana.

Bordered by Market Street, Wallace, and 5th street, this neighborhood is currently zoned as "industrial". It is surrounded by companies such as Illini Recycling, Sport's Redi-mix, Judson Baptist Chapel, and The Salvation Army.
