= Royal, Illinois =

Royal
- Village
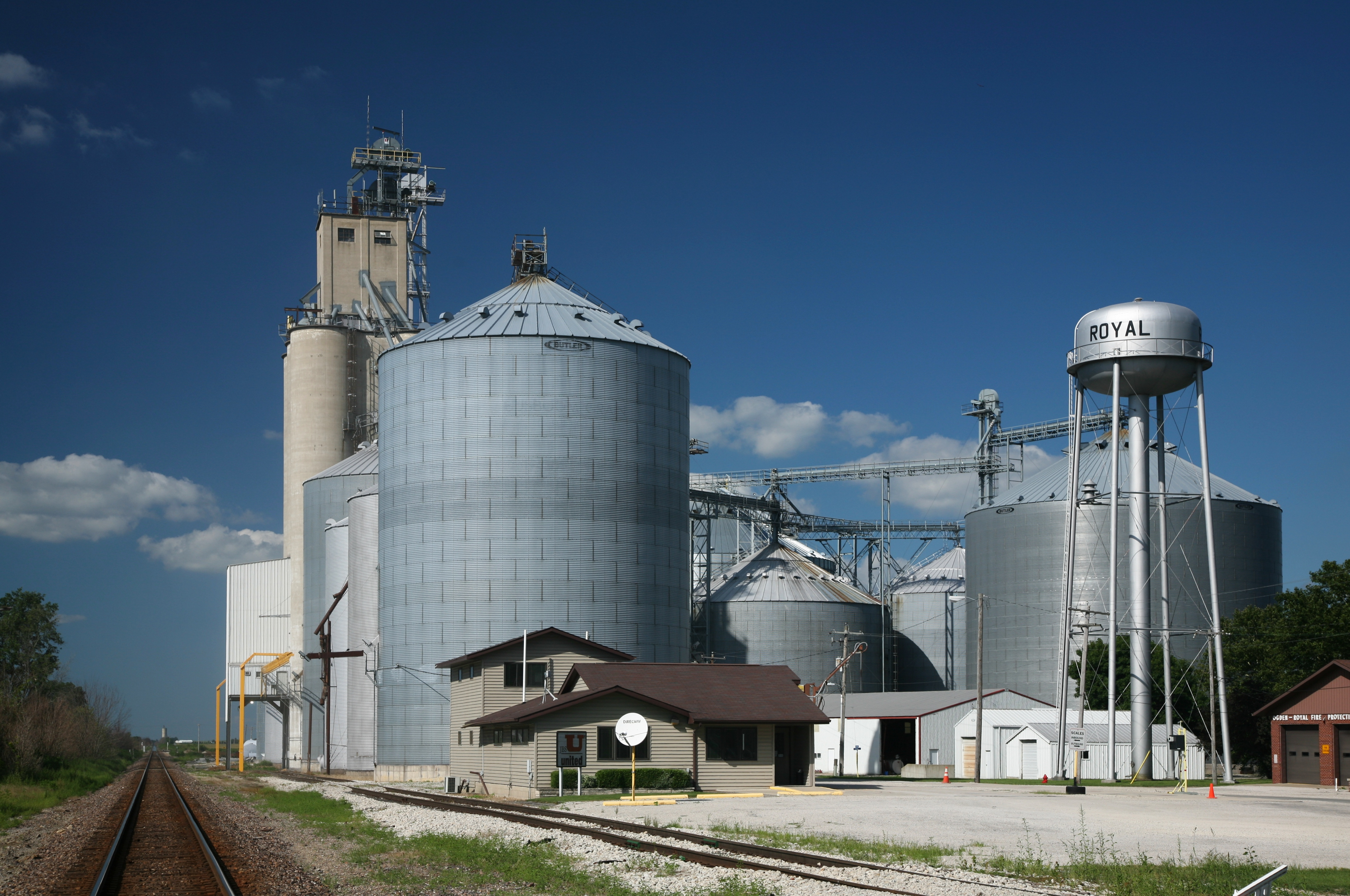
- Grain elevators and water tower in Royal, IL

- Location of Royal in Champaign County, Illinois.

- Location within Champaign County Royal (Illinois)
- Coordinates: 40°11′35″N 87°58′19″W
- Country: United States
- State: Illinois
- County: Champaign
- Founded: 1882

Area
  - Total: 0.18 sq mi (0.47 km^{2})
  - Land: 0.18 sq mi (0.47 km^{2})
  - Water: 0 sq mi (0.00 km^{2})
- Elevation: 686 ft (209 m)

Population (2020)
  - Total: 293
  - Density: 1,598.2/sq mi (617.07/km^{2})
- Time zone: UTC-6 (CST)
  - Summer (DST): UTC-5 (CDT)
- Zip code: 61871
- Area code: 217
- FIPS code: 17-66157
- GNIS feature ID: 2399136
- Website: villageofroyal.com

Royal is a village in Champaign County, Illinois, United States. The population was 293 at the 2020 census.

== History ==
Royal, Illinois is a small village that in part consists of grain elevators at the intersection of a railroad and County Road 20.

Nearly a hundred years ago, the people of St. John Lutheran Church decided to move their church building into town, to better serve current and future generations of people in the village of Royal. Not everyone initially wanted to move the church building; the vote to move was narrowly split. Nonetheless, having made the decision, the congregation came together and embraced the vision for a ministry within the village of Royal. The people worked together for many hours to move their church home. The men and boys of the congregation carefully deconstructed the church, brick by brick, and transported the bricks from out in the country into the village of Royal. There, the congregation's women and older men painstakingly cleaned the mortar from the bricks to provide the building blocks for a new St. John Lutheran Church to serve the people of Royal. The church still stands today, with 831 members and an average attendance of 200 people.

In 1982, around the time of the town's centennial anniversary, people began to talk to one another about constructing a shared Community Building to benefit the current and future people of Royal. Hearkening back to the example of the members of St. John's, the wider community came together around the shared vision of a community of people living together. This vision was embodied in the concept of a Community Building.

An apartment building in Champaign, Illinois needed to be demolished. Hearkening back to the example of the people of St. John Lutheran, the people gathered the bricks and worked together to clean the mortar from each brick. The people then built the new Community Building with these bricks, and it was completed the year after the centennial. The building still stands today and is used by the people of Royal for personal and public events for as little as $85.00 for a small group.

== Geography ==
According to the 2021 census gazetteer files, Royal has a total area of 0.18 square miles (0.47 km^{2}), all land.

== Demographics ==
Historical population
Census	Pop.	Note	%±
1960	171		—
1970	197		15.2%
1980	274		39.1%
1990	217		−20.8%
2000	279		28.6%
2010	293		5.0%
2020	293		0.0%
U.S. Decennial Census

As of the 2020 census there were 293 people, 149 households, and 101 families residing in the village. The population density was 1,601.09 inhabitants per square mile (618.18/km^{2}). There were 143 housing units at an average density of 781.42 per square mile (301.71/km^{2}). The racial makeup of the village was 95.56% White, 0.34% African American, 0.68% Asian, 0.68% from other races, and 2.73% from two or more races. Hispanic or Latino of any race were 0.68% of the population.

There were 149 households, out of which 28.2% had children under the age of 18 living with them, 57.05% were married couples living together, 10.07% had a female householder with no husband present, and 32.21% were non-families. 29.53% of all households were made up of individuals, and 18.79% had someone living alone who was 65 years of age or older. The average household size was 3.04 and the average family size was 2.48.

The village's age distribution consisted of 21.9% under the age of 18, 8.9% from 18 to 24, 23.7% from 25 to 44, 22.1% from 45 to 64, and 23.2% who were 65 years of age or older. The median age was 40.4 years. For every 100 females, there were 94.7 males. For every 100 females age 18 and over, there were 81.8 males.

The median income for a household in the village was $75,750, and the median income for a family was $91,750. Males had a median income of $46,250 versus $32,188 for females. The per capita income for the village was $35,455. About 4.0% of families and 5.7% of the population were below the poverty line, including 14.8% of those under age 18 and 1.2% of those age 65 or over.
