= Philo Township, Champaign County, Illinois =

Philo Township
- Township
- Location in Champaign County

- Champaign County's location in Illinois
- Coordinates: 40°00′38″N 88°10′55″W
- Country: United States
- State: Illinois
- County: Champaign
- Established: November 8, 1859

Area
  - Total: 36.66 sq mi (94.9 km^{2})
  - Land: 36.66 sq mi (94.9 km^{2})
  - Water: 0 sq mi (0 km^{2}) 0%
- Elevation: 682 ft (208 m)

Population (2020)
  - Total: 1,897
  - Density: 51.75/sq mi (19.98/km^{2})
- Time zone: UTC-6 (CST)
  - Summer (DST): UTC-5 (CDT)
- FIPS code: 17-019-59546

Philo Township is a township in Champaign County, Illinois, USA. As of the 2020 census, its population was 1,897 and it contained 762 housing units.

== History ==
Philo Township changed its name from Hale Township on April 30, 1860.

== Geography ==
Philo is Township 18 North, Range 9 East of the Third Principal Meridian.

According to the 2010 census, the township has a total area of 36.66 square miles (94.9 km^{2}), all land.

=== Cities and towns ===
- Philo

=== Cemeteries ===
The township contains these cemeteries: Calvary, Captain Davidson, Locust Grove (Section 22) and Loeffler.

=== Grain elevators ===
Philo elevator (Section 22) was built along the Wabash—Norfolk Southern railroad.

=== Major highways ===
- Illinois State Route 130

== Demographics ==
As of the 2020 census there were 1,897 people, 714 households, and 582 families residing in the township. The population density was 51.75 inhabitants per square mile (19.98/km^{2}). There were 762 housing units at an average density of 20.79 per square mile (8.03/km^{2}). The racial makeup of the township was 94.31% White, 0.42% African American, 0.16% Native American, 0.69% Asian, 0.21% Pacific Islander, 0.84% from other races, and 3.37% from two or more races. Hispanic or Latino of any race were 1.11% of the population.

There were 714 households, out of which 31.80% had children under the age of 18 living with them, 73.53% were married couples living together, 7.98% had a female householder with no spouse present, and 18.49% were non-families. 14.80% of all households were made up of individuals, and 9.10% had someone living alone who was 65 years of age or older. The average household size was 2.90 and the average family size was 3.19.

The township's age distribution consisted of 20.6% under the age of 18, 10.1% from 18 to 24, 30.7% from 25 to 44, 27.2% from 45 to 64, and 11.4% who were 65 years of age or older. The median age was 36.6 years. For every 100 females, there were 97.7 males. For every 100 females age 18 and over, there were 100.0 males.

The median income for a household in the township was $96,818, and the median income for a family was $106,528. Males had a median income of $52,639 versus $53,500 for females. The per capita income for the township was $41,400. About 2.4% of families and 3.5% of the population were below the poverty line, including 7.9% of those under age 18 and 2.9% of those age 65 or over.

Historical population
Census	Pop.	Note	%±
2010	1,954		—
2020	1,897		−2.9%
U.S. Decennial Census
