= Parkville, Illinois =

- Unincorporated community
- Location within Illinois Location within the United States
- Coordinates: 39°53′30″N 88°21′40″W
- Country: United States
- State: Illinois
- County: Champaign
- Elevation: 673 ft (205 m)
- Time zone: UTC-6 (Central (CST))
  - Summer (DST): UTC-5 (CDT)
- Area code: 217
- GNIS feature ID: 424530

Parkville is an unincorporated community in Champaign County, Illinois, United States. Parkville is located along Twomile Slough, 5.2 miles (8.4 km) south-southwest of Sadorus.
