= St. Joseph Township, Champaign County, Illinois =

Saint Joseph Township
- Township
- Location in Champaign County

- Champaign County's location in Illinois
- Coordinates: 40°06′09″N 88°03′46″W
- Country: United States
- State: Illinois
- County: Champaign
- Established: November 8, 1859

Area
  - Total: 36.63 sq mi (94.9 km^{2})
  - Land: 36.48 sq mi (94.5 km^{2})
  - Water: 0.15 sq mi (0.39 km^{2}) 0.41%
- Elevation: 669 ft (204 m)

Population (2020)
  - Total: 5,597
  - Density: 153.4/sq mi (59.24/km^{2})
- Time zone: UTC-6 (CST)
  - Summer (DST): UTC-5 (CDT)
- FIPS code: 17-019-66963

Saint Joseph Township is a township in Champaign County, Illinois, USA. As of the 2020 census, its population was 5,597 and it contained 2,244 housing units.

== Geography ==
St. Joseph is Township 19 North, Range 10 East of the Third Principal Meridian.

According to the 2010 census, the township has a total area of 36.63 square miles (94.9 km^{2}), of which 36.48 square miles (94.5 km^{2}) (or 99.59%) is land and 0.15 square miles (0.39 km^{2}) (or 0.41%) is water.

The western section of the Kickapoo Rail Trail follows the former Big Four—Conrail System railroad right–of–way along U.S. Route 150 from the City of Urbana to the Village of St. Joseph. Going east from Urbana landmarks along the trail include Urbana Walmart, John Deere implement dealer, Cottonwood Road (CR 1700E), CR 1800E, Mt. Olive Cemetery, Mayview, Sellers Road (CR 1900E), Full′s Siding elevator, CR 1975E, CR 2075E, Corteva (Pioneer Supply) seed company, Salt Fork Paintball, the baseball field, Salt Fork River bridge, St. Joseph water tower, Wheelhouse restaurant and Main Street Mall, St. Joseph business district and elevator.

=== Cities and towns ===
- St. Joseph

=== Cemeteries ===
Mt. Olive Cemetery (Section 7) is west of Mayview on the north side of U.S. Route 150.

Historic cemeteries (some of these may no longer be visible): Bartley Cemetery (Section 26), Cora Brooks farm (Section 3), Deadman′s Grove (Section 7), Huss Cemetery (Section 33), Indian burial ground (Section 27), Patterson Cemetery (Section 24), Peters or Thompson Cemetery (Section 25), Stayton Cemetery (Section 28)

=== Grain Elevators ===
Full's Siding elevator (Section 17) was built on the Big Four—Conrail System railroad. The concrete silos and steel bins are on the south side of U.S. Route 150 east of Mayview.

Mayview elevators (Section 18), built on the Big Four—Conrail System railroad, are no longer standing. J.B. Walton and Son and E.C. Saddoris were operators in 1913.

St. Joseph elevator (Section 14), built on the Big Four—Conrail System railroad, is in the Village of St. Joseph. Operated by the Rising Farmer's Grain Company in 1918.

Tipton elevator (Section 26) was built on the Chicago and Eastern Illinois—Union Pacific railroad. Operated by Dryer and Burt Grain and Coal in 1913; Ogden and Burt in 1929.

=== Major highways ===
- Interstate 74
- U.S. Route 150

== Demographics ==
As of the 2020 census there were 5,597 people, 1,999 households, and 1,441 families residing in the township. The population density was 152.79 inhabitants per square mile (58.99/km^{2}). There were 2,244 housing units at an average density of 61.26 per square mile (23.65/km^{2}). The racial makeup of the township was 93.55% White, 0.45% African American, 0.21% Native American, 0.71% Asian, 0.00% Pacific Islander, 0.82% from other races, and 4.25% from two or more races. Hispanic or Latino of any race were 2.34% of the population.

There were 1,999 households, out of which 43.90% had children under the age of 18 living with them, 53.13% were married couples living together, 17.36% had a female householder with no spouse present, and 27.91% were non-families. 21.80% of all households were made up of individuals, and 13.20% had someone living alone who was 65 years of age or older. The average household size was 2.89 and the average family size was 3.44.

The township's age distribution consisted of 31.5% under the age of 18, 4.1% from 18 to 24, 26.8% from 25 to 44, 25.5% from 45 to 64, and 12.2% who were 65 years of age or older. The median age was 37.2 years. For every 100 females, there were 94.2 males. For every 100 females age 18 and over, there were 91.3 males.

The median income for a household in the township was $93,233, and the median income for a family was $105,592. Males had a median income of $53,427 versus $49,179 for females. The per capita income for the township was $35,727. About 1.9% of families and 5.7% of the population were below the poverty line, including 2.5% of those under age 18 and 13.5% of those age 65 or over.

Historical population
Census	Pop.	Note	%±
2010	5,876		—
2020	5,597		−4.7%
U.S. Decennial Census
