= Sellers, Illinois =

- Unincorporated community
- Location within Illinois Location within the United States
- Coordinates: 40°11′11″N 88°06′17″W
- Country: United States
- State: Illinois
- County: Champaign
- Elevation: 696 ft (212 m)
- Time zone: UTC-6 (Central (CST))
  - Summer (DST): UTC-5 (CDT)
- Area code: 217
- GNIS feature ID: 423173

Sellers is an unincorporated community in Champaign County, Illinois, United States. Sellers is northeast of Urbana.
