= County board =

A county board is a common form of county legislature, particular of counties in the United States.

Related forms of county government include:

- Board of Supervisors — a form of county legislature in some U.S. states
- County commission, also called a board of county commissioners — a form of county administration in some U.S. states
- County council — a form of county legislature in some countries.

Some states, such as New York, uses a County Legislature for larger, "chartered" counties, but have a Board of Supervisors for smaller rural counties.

Forms unique to a single state include:

- Police jury — the most common form of legislature in parishes of Louisiana
- Board of Chosen Freeholders — the county legislature in each county of New Jersey
- Fiscal court — Same in Kentucky.

== See also ==
- County executive
- Local government in the United States
