= Leverett, Illinois =

- Unincorporated community
- Location within Illinois Location within the United States
- Coordinates: 40°11′21″N 88°12′35″W
- Country: United States
- State: Illinois
- County: Champaign
- Elevation: 686 ft (209 m)
- Time zone: UTC-6 (Central (CST))
  - Summer (DST): UTC-5 (CDT)
- Area code: 217
- GNIS feature ID: 422910

Leverett is an unincorporated community in Champaign County, Illinois, United States. Leverett is located along a railroad line north of Urbana.
