= Ivesdale, Illinois =

Ivesdale
- Village
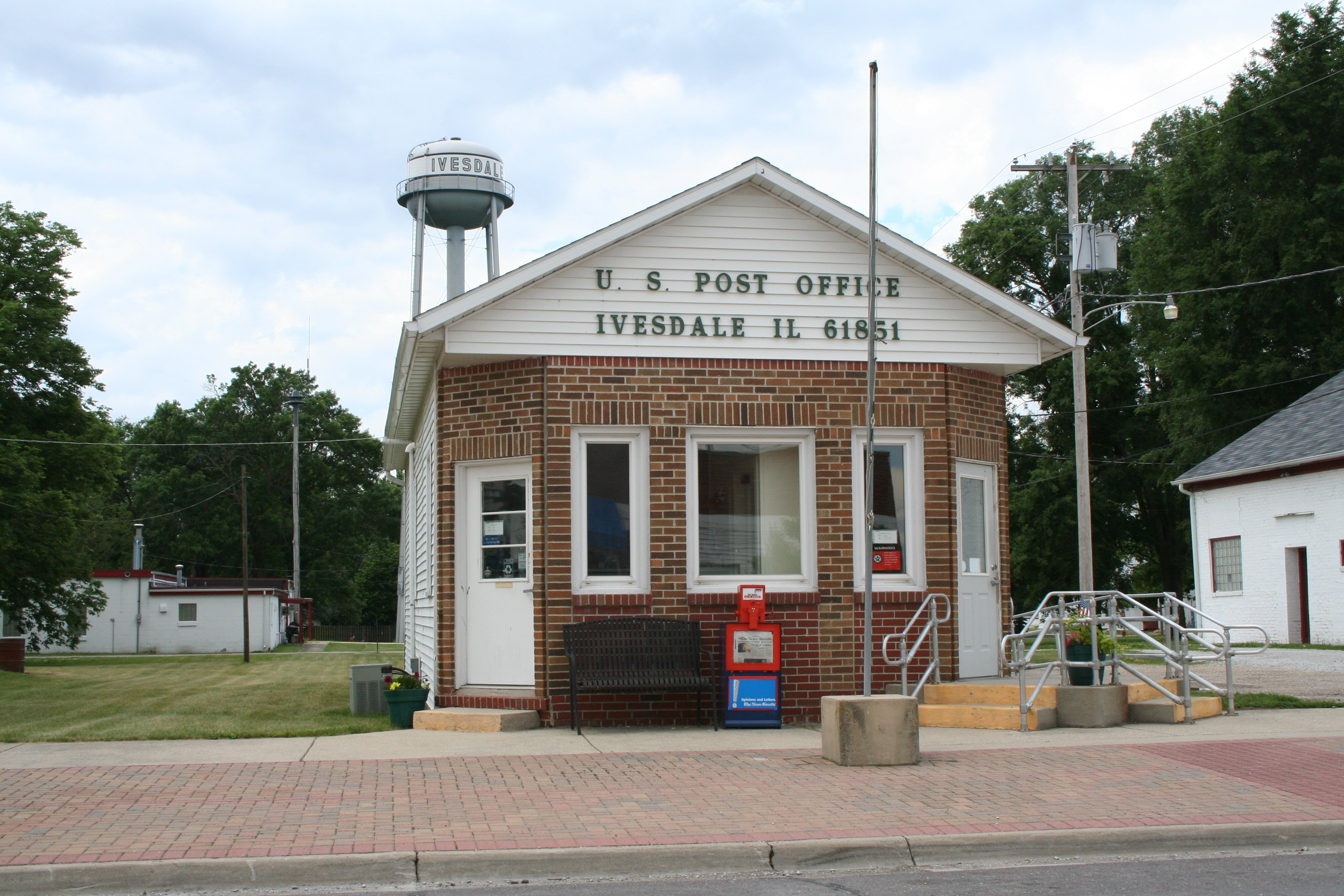
- Post Office and Water Tower

- Location of Ivesdale in Piatt and Champaign Counties, Illinois.

- Location within Champaign County Ivesdale (Illinois)
- Coordinates: 39°56′45″N 88°27′21″W
- Country: United States
- State: Illinois
- County: Champaign, Piatt

Government
  - Village President: Dan Bates, Jr.

Area
  - Total: 0.71 sq mi (1.85 km^{2})
  - Land: 0.71 sq mi (1.85 km^{2})
  - Water: 0 sq mi (0.00 km^{2})
- Elevation: 682 ft (208 m)

Population (2020)
  - Total: 265
  - Density: 370/sq mi (142.9/km^{2})
- Time zone: UTC-6 (CST)
  - Summer (DST): UTC-5 (CDT)
- Zip code: 61851
- Area code: 217
- FIPS code: 17-37998
- GNIS ID: 2398284

Ivesdale is a village in Champaign County, Illinois, United States; a very small portion of the village extends into Piatt County, Illinois. The population was 265 at the 2020 census.

== History ==
Ivesdale is served by Saint Joseph Catholic Parish and is home to Saint Joseph Roman Catholic Church (built in 1894) which is known locally as "The Cathedral of the Cornfield".

Bernard Alblinger, who served as mayor from 1963 until his death in 2011, was the second-longest-serving mayor in the history of Illinois, serving a total of 48 consecutive years.

== Geography ==
According to the 2021 census gazetteer files, Ivesdale has a total area of 0.72 square miles (1.86 km^{2}), all land.

== Demographics ==
Historical population
Census	Pop.	Note	%±
1880	235		—
1890	323		37.4%
1900	476		47.4%
1910	436		−8.4%
1920	390		−10.6%
1930	386		−1.0%
1940	386		0.0%
1950	407		5.4%
1960	360		−11.5%
1970	357		−0.8%
1980	339		−5.0%
1990	339		0.0%
2000	288		−15.0%
2010	267		−7.3%
2020	265		−0.7%
U.S. Decennial Census

As of the 2020 census there were 265 people, 113 households, and 74 families residing in the village. The population density was 370.11 inhabitants per square mile (142.90/km^{2}). There were 121 housing units at an average density of 168.99 per square mile (65.25/km^{2}). The racial makeup of the village was 95.85% White, 0.38% African American, and 3.77% from two or more races. Hispanic or Latino of any race were 0.75% of the population.

There were 113 households, out of which 26.5% had children under the age of 18 living with them, 52.21% were married couples living together, 8.85% had a female householder with no husband present, and 34.51% were non-families. 28.32% of all households were made up of individuals, and 19.47% had someone living alone who was 65 years of age or older. The average household size was 2.68 and the average family size was 2.21.

The village's age distribution consisted of 21.6% under the age of 18, 6.8% from 18 to 24, 27.2% from 25 to 44, 26.8% from 45 to 64, and 17.6% who were 65 years of age or older. The median age was 39.9 years. For every 100 females, there were 88.0 males. For every 100 females age 18 and over, there were 79.8 males.

The median income for a household in the village was $51,477, and the median income for a family was $56,250. Males had a median income of $47,917 versus $26,500 for females. The per capita income for the village was $25,204. About 14.9% of families and 17.6% of the population were below the poverty line, including 27.8% of those under age 18 and 22.7% of those age 65 or over.

== Education ==
It is in the Bement Community Unit School District 5.

== Gallery ==
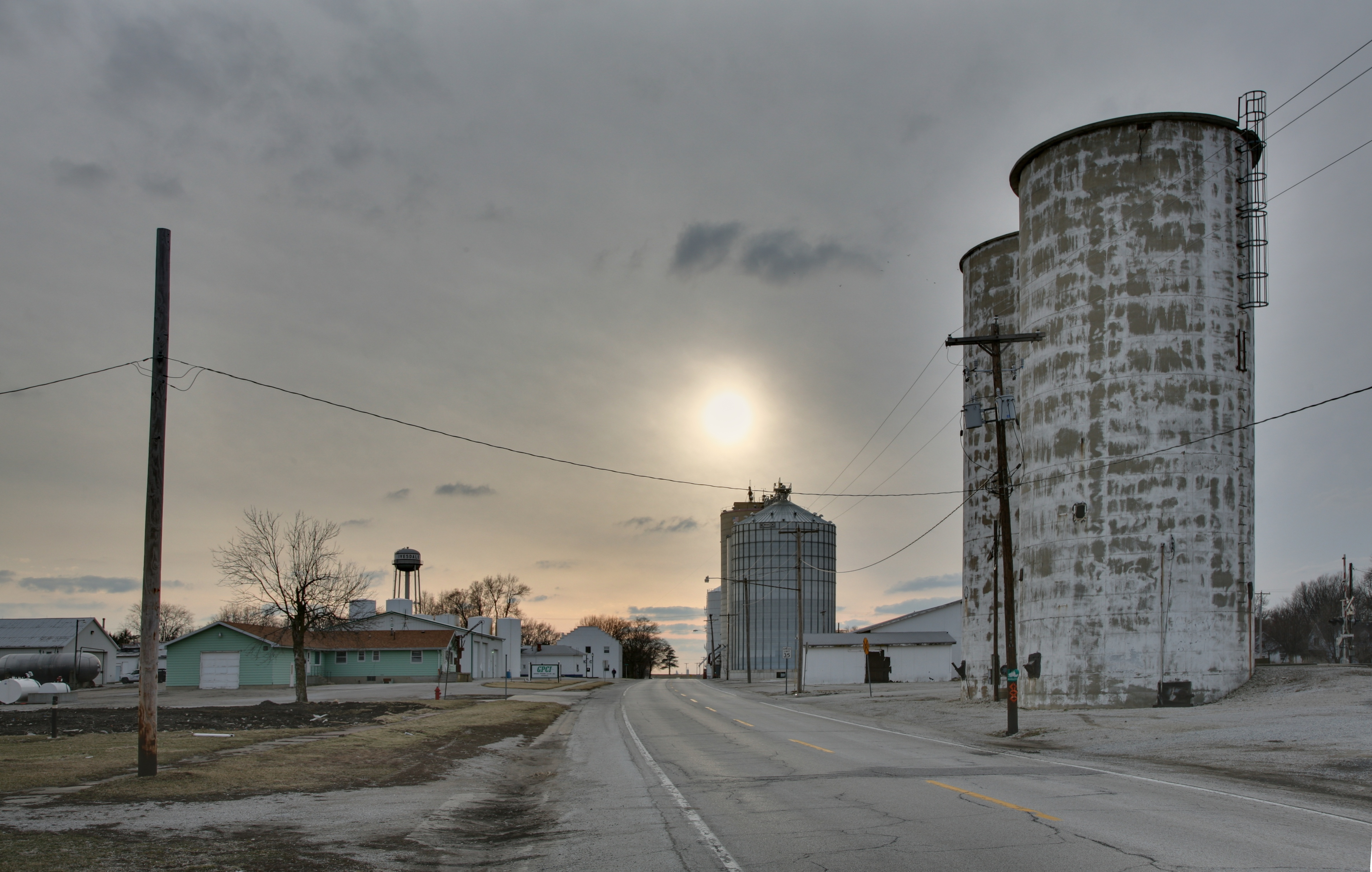
Ivesdale grain elevators

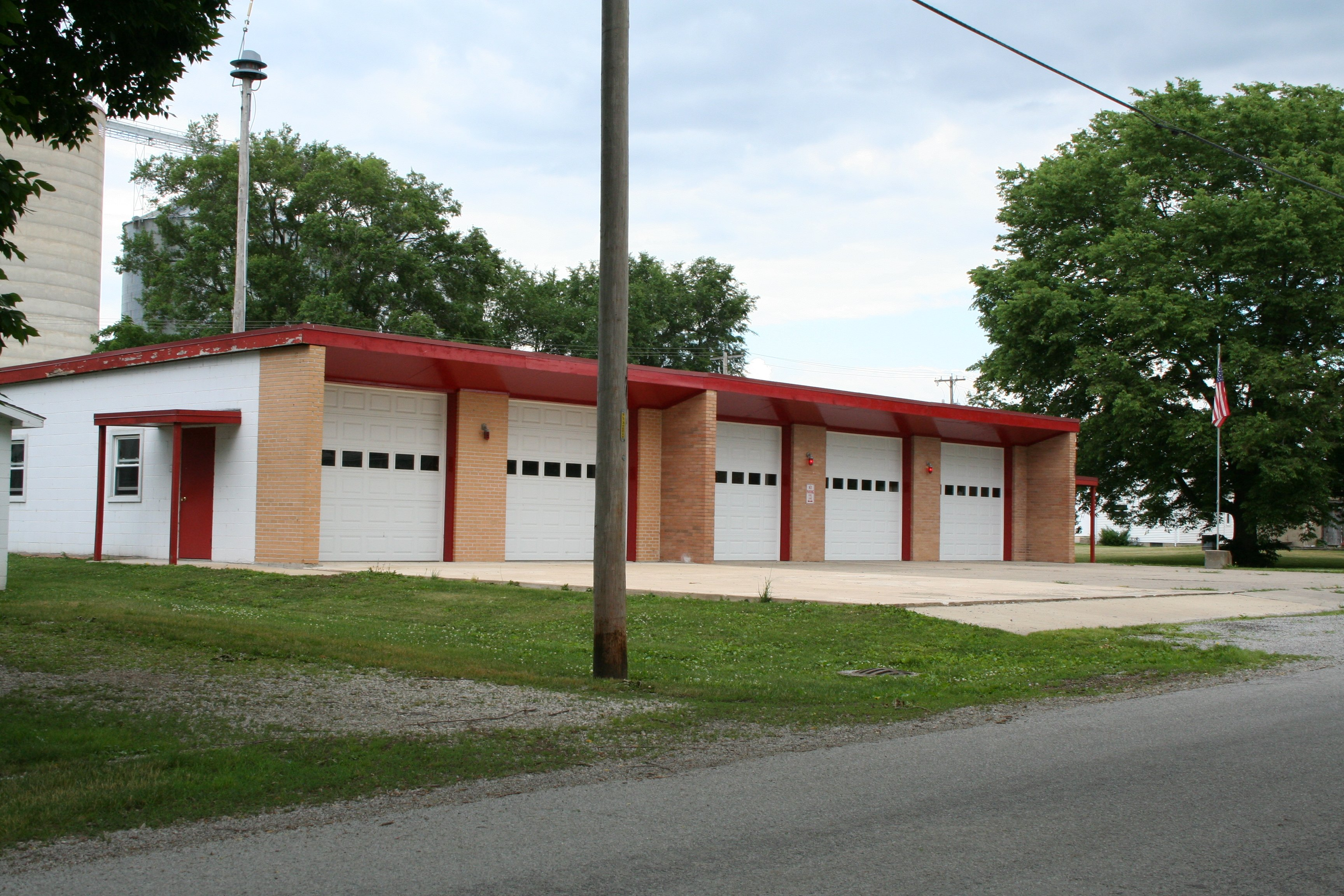
Ivesdale fire station

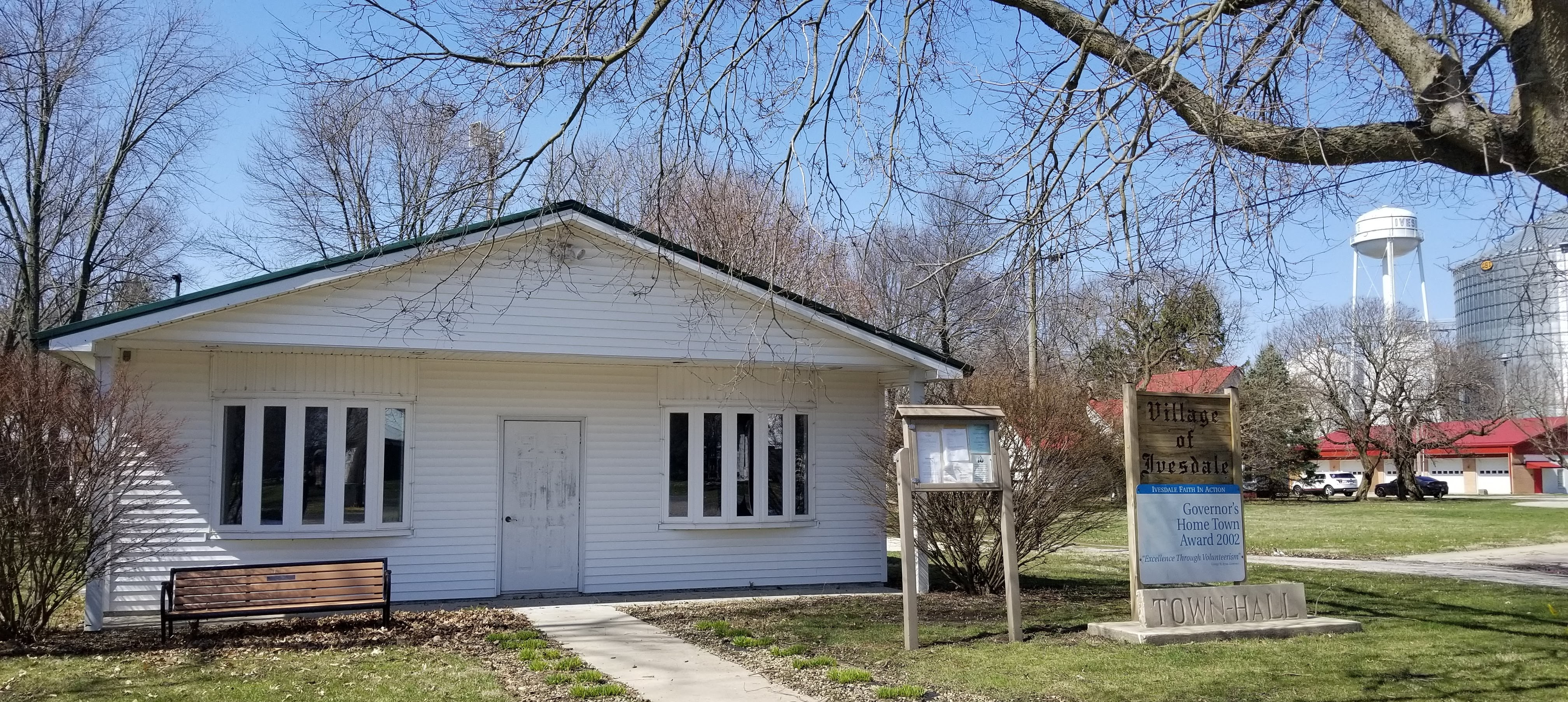
Ivesdale town hall
