= Sadorus Township, Champaign County, Illinois =

Sadorus Township
- Township
- Location in Champaign County

- Champaign County's location in Illinois
- Coordinates: 39°55′51″N 88°23′49″W
- Country: United States
- State: Illinois
- County: Champaign
- Established: November 8, 1859

Area
  - Total: 37.95 sq mi (98.3 km^{2})
  - Land: 37.9 sq mi (98 km^{2})
  - Water: 0.05 sq mi (0.13 km^{2}) 0.13%
- Elevation: 699 ft (213 m)

Population (2020)
  - Total: 948
  - Density: 25.0/sq mi (9.66/km^{2})
- Time zone: UTC-6 (CST)
  - Summer (DST): UTC-5 (CDT)
- FIPS code: 17-019-66547

Sadorus Township is a township in Champaign County, Illinois, USA. As of the 2020 census, its population was 948 and it contained 423 housing units.

== Geography ==
Sadorus is Township 17 North, Range 7 East of the Third Principal Meridian.

According to the 2010 census, the township has a total area of 37.95 square miles (98.3 km^{2}), of which 37.9 square miles (98 km^{2}) (or 99.87%) is land and 0.05 square miles (0.13 km^{2}) (or 0.13%) is water.

=== Cities and towns ===
- Ivesdale (east three-quarters)
- Sadorus

=== Unincorporated towns ===
- Parkville

(This list is based on USGS data and may include former settlements.)

=== Cemeteries ===
The township contains these cemeteries: O'Brien (Section 32), Old Frame, Rice (Section 26), Rock, and Sadorus.

== Demographics ==
As of the 2020 census there were 948 people, 376 households, and 240 families residing in the township. The population density was 24.99 inhabitants per square mile (9.65/km^{2}). There were 423 housing units at an average density of 11.15 per square mile (4.31/km^{2}). The racial makeup of the township was 91.03% White, 0.11% African American, 0.63% Native American, 0.53% Asian, 0.00% Pacific Islander, 0.21% from other races, and 7.49% from two or more races. Hispanic or Latino of any race were 2.64% of the population.

There were 376 households, out of which 25.50% had children under the age of 18 living with them, 51.60% were married couples living together, 6.91% had a female householder with no spouse present, and 36.17% were non-families. 25.00% of all households were made up of individuals, and 18.60% had someone living alone who was 65 years of age or older. The average household size was 2.29 and the average family size was 2.77.

The township's age distribution consisted of 18.9% under the age of 18, 3.4% from 18 to 24, 20.2% from 25 to 44, 30.8% from 45 to 64, and 26.6% who were 65 years of age or older. The median age was 51.8 years. For every 100 females, there were 93.0 males. For every 100 females age 18 and over, there were 98.9 males.

The median income for a household in the township was $56,875, and the median income for a family was $75,000. Males had a median income of $51,000 versus $22,083 for females. The per capita income for the township was $33,567. About 5.8% of families and 7.7% of the population were below the poverty line, including 14.7% of those under age 18 and 4.4% of those age 65 or over.

Historical population
Census	Pop.	Note	%±
2010	967		—
2020	948		−2.0%
U.S. Decennial Census
