= Pesotum, Illinois =

Pesotum
- Village
- Location of Pesotum in Champaign County, Illinois.

- Location within Champaign County Pesotum (Illinois)
- Coordinates: 39°54′47″N 88°16′28″W
- Country: United States
- State: Illinois
- County: Champaign

Area
  - Total: 0.58 sq mi (1.50 km^{2})
  - Land: 0.57 sq mi (1.47 km^{2})
  - Water: 0.0077 sq mi (0.02 km^{2})
- Elevation: 715 ft (218 m)

Population (2020)
  - Total: 550
  - Density: 966.7/sq mi (373.24/km^{2})
- Time zone: UTC-6 (CST)
  - Summer (DST): UTC-5 (CDT)
- Postal code: 61863
- Area code: 217
- FIPS code: 17-59273
- GNIS feature ID: 2399658
- Website: https://pesotum.org/

Pesotum is a village in Champaign County, Illinois, United States. As of the 2020 census, Pesotum had a population of 550.

The village was named after Pesotum, a Native American warrior in the Battle of Fort Dearborn.

== Geography ==
According to the 2021 census gazetteer files, Pesotum has a total area of 0.58 square miles (1.50 km^{2}), of which 0.57 square miles (1.48 km^{2}) (or 98.44%) is land and 0.01 square miles (0.03 km^{2}) (or 1.56%) is water.

== Demographics ==
Historical population
Census	Pop.	Note	%±
1910	376		—
1920	478		27.1%
1930	404		−15.5%
1940	367		−9.2%
1950	415		13.1%
1960	468		12.8%
1970	536		14.5%
1980	651		21.5%
1990	558		−14.3%
2000	521		−6.6%
2010	551		5.8%
2020	550		−0.2%
U.S. Decennial Census

As of the 2020 census, there were 550 people, 193 households, and 120 families residing in the village. The population density was 951.56 inhabitants per square mile (367.40/km^{2}). There were 249 housing units at an average density of 430.80 per square mile (166.33/km^{2}). The racial makeup of the village was 96.73% White, 0.73% African American, 0.18% from other races, and 2.36% from two or more races. Hispanic or Latino of any race were 1.64% of the population.

There were 193 households, out of which 23.8% had children under the age of 18 living with them, 48.19% were married couples living together, 5.18% had a female householder with no husband present, and 37.82% were non-families. 32.12% of all households were made up of individuals, and 13.47% had someone living alone who was 65 years of age or older. The average household size was 2.91 and the average family size was 2.32.

The village's age distribution consisted of 16.3% under the age of 18, 7.6% from 18 to 24, 22.1% from 25 to 44, 39.9% from 45 to 64, and 14.1% who were 65 years of age or older. The median age was 47.1 years. For every 100 females, there were 96.1 males. For every 100 females age 18 and over, there were 95.8 males.

The median income for a household in the village was $76,339, and the median income for a family was $87,917. Males had a median income of $44,875 versus $40,000 for females. The per capita income for the village was $33,158. About 8.3% of families and 8.0% of the population were below the poverty line, including 3.1% of those under age 18 and 6.3% of those age 65 or over.

== Education ==
It is in the Tolono Community Unit School District 7.
