= South Fork Township, Christian County, Illinois =

South Fork Township
- Township
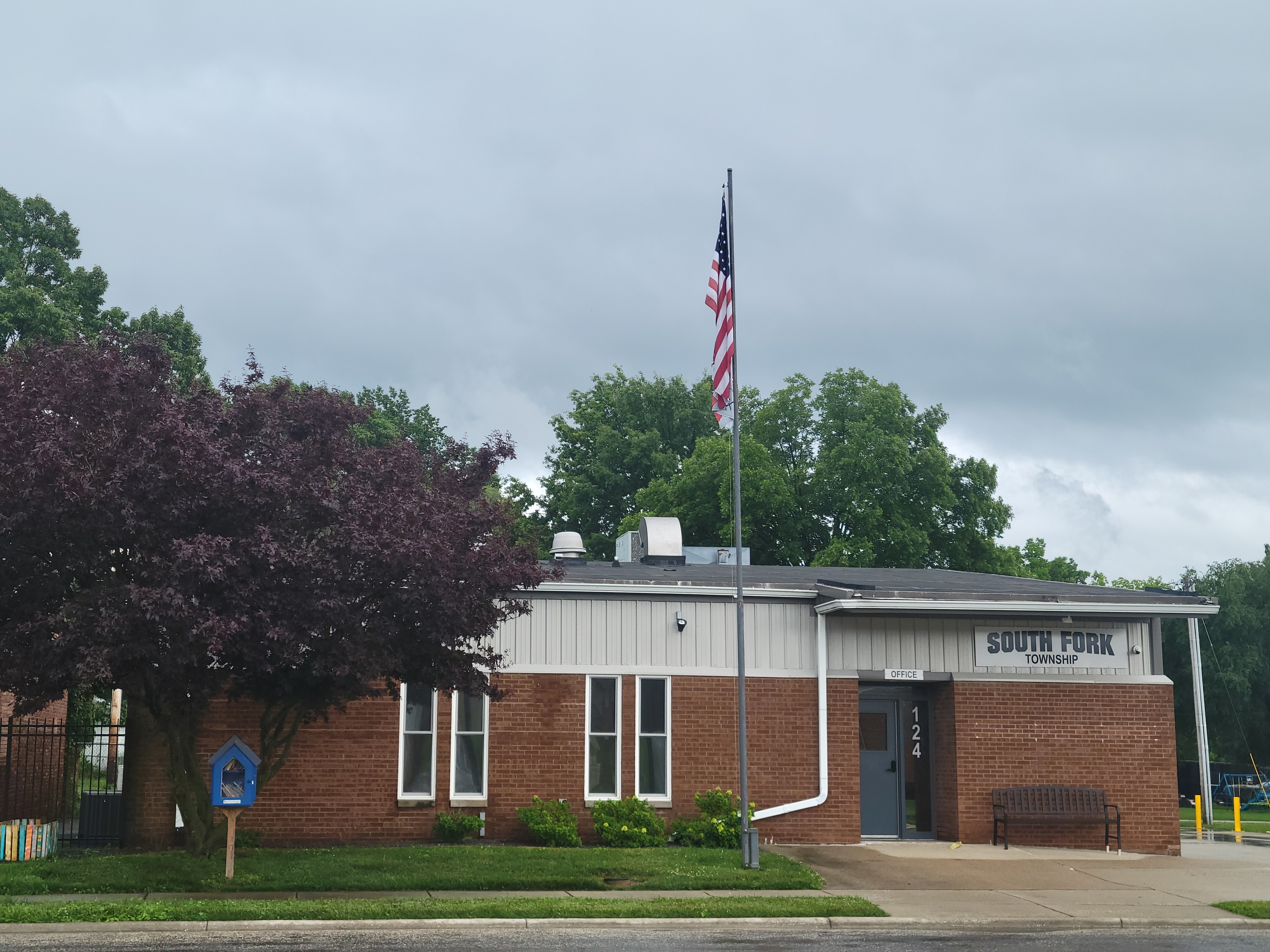
- Township building in Kincaid

- Location in Christian County

- Christian County's location in Illinois
- Coordinates: 39°35′12″N 89°27′21″W
- Country: United States
- State: Illinois
- County: Christian
- Established: November 7, 1865

Area
  - Total: 65.79 sq mi (170.4 km^{2})
  - Land: 62.13 sq mi (160.9 km^{2})
  - Water: 3.67 sq mi (9.5 km^{2}) 5.58%
- Elevation: 597 ft (182 m)

Population (2020)
  - Total: 2,565
  - Density: 41.28/sq mi (15.94/km^{2})
- Time zone: UTC-6 (CST)
  - Summer (DST): UTC-5 (CDT)
- ZIP codes: 62517, 62531, 62540, 62546, 62558, 62568, 62570
- FIPS code: 17-021-70798

South Fork Township is one of seventeen townships in Christian County, Illinois, USA. As of the 2020 census, its population was 2,565, and it contained 1,242 housing units.

== Geography ==
According to the 2010 census, the township has a total area of 65.79 square miles (170.4 km^{2}), of which 62.13 square miles (160.9 km^{2}) (or 94.44%) is land, and 3.67 square miles (9.5 km^{2}) (or 5.58%) is water. The township contains Sangchris Lake State Recreation Area.

=== Major settlements ===
- Bulpitt
- Jeisyville
- Kincaid
- Tovey

=== Unincorporated towns ===
- Sicily at 39.590051°N 89.491206°W
- Tovey Humphrey Station at 39.589772°N 89.455093°W

=== Cemeteries ===
The township contains cemeteries: Achenback Lutheran, Bethany, Anderson and Finley.

=== Major highways ===
- Illinois Route 104

== Demographics ==
Historical population
Census	Pop.	Note	%±
1870	1,279		—
1880	1,600		25.1%
1890	1,506		−5.9%
1900	1,395		−7.4%
1910	1,169		−16.2%
1920	4,335		270.8%
1930	4,503		3.9%
1940	4,241		−5.8%
1950	4,261		0.5%
1960	3,507		−17.7%
1970	3,039		−13.3%
1980	3,151		3.7%
1990	2,629		−16.6%
2000	2,696		2.5%
2010	2,788		3.4%
2020	2,565		−8.0%
U.S. Decennial Census

As of the 2020 census there were 2,565 people, 1,139 households, and 677 families residing in the township. The population density was 38.93 inhabitants per square mile (15.03/km^{2}). There were 1,242 housing units at an average density of 18.85 per square mile (7.28/km^{2}). The racial makeup of the township was 94.58% White, 0.39% African American, 0.23% Native American, 0.19% Asian, 0.00% Pacific Islander, 0.27% from other races, and 4.33% from two or more races. Hispanic or Latino of any race were 1.05% of the population.

There were 1,139 households, out of which 23.10% had children under the age of 18 living with them, 47.67% were married couples living together, 7.64% had a female householder with no spouse present, and 40.56% were non-families. 29.10% of all households were made up of individuals, and 11.80% had someone living alone who was 65 years of age or older. The average household size was 2.28 and the average family size was 2.86.

The township's age distribution consisted of 17.7% under the age of 18, 10.9% from 18 to 24, 22.9% from 25 to 44, 31.4% from 45 to 64, and 17.0% who were 65 years of age or older. The median age was 43.7 years. For every 100 females, there were 107.0 males. For every 100 females age 18 and over, there were 104.9 males.

The median income for a household in the township was $62,813, and the median income for a family was $84,297. Males had a median income of $56,705 versus $31,719 for females. The per capita income for the township was $37,868. About 4.4% of families and 10.4% of the population were below the poverty line, including 11.1% of those under age 18 and 13.3% of those age 65 or over.

== School districts ==
- Edinburg Community Unit School District 4
- Morrisonville Community Unit School District 1
- Pawnee Community Unit School District 11
- South Fork School District 14
- Taylorville Community Unit School District 3

== Political districts ==
- State House District 98
- State Senate District 49
