= Audubon Township, Montgomery County, Illinois =

Audubon
- Township
- Location in Montgomery County

- Location of Audubon Township in Illinois
- Coordinates: 39°17′N 89°11′W
- Country: United States
- State: Illinois
- County: Montgomery
- Settled: November 5, 1872

Area
  - Total: 53.96 sq mi (139.8 km^{2})
  - Land: 53.94 sq mi (139.7 km^{2})
  - Water: 0.02 sq mi (0.052 km^{2})
- Elevation: 666 ft (203 m)

Population (2010)
  - Estimate (2016): 529
- Time zone: UTC-6 (CST)
  - Summer (DST): UTC-5 (CDT)
- FIPS code: 17-135-02960

Audubon Township (T10+N½T9N R1W) is located in Montgomery County, Illinois, United States. As of the 2010 census, its population was 552 and it contained 253 housing units.

== Geography ==
According to the 2010 census, the township has a total area of 53.96 square miles (139.8 km^{2}), of which 53.94 square miles (139.7 km^{2}) (or 99.96%) is land and 0.02 square miles (0.052 km^{2}) (or 0.04%) is water.

== Demographics ==
Historical population
Census	Pop.	Note	%±
2016 (est.)	529
U.S. Decennial Census

== Adjacent townships ==
- Rosamond Township, Christian County (north)
- Pana Township, Christian County (northeast)
- Oconee Township, Shelby County (east)
- Ramsey Township, Fayette County (southeast)
- Hurricane Township, Fayette County (south)
- Witt Township (southwest)
- Nokomis Township (west)
- Greenwood Township, Christian County (northwest)
