= May Township, Christian County, Illinois =

May Township
- Township
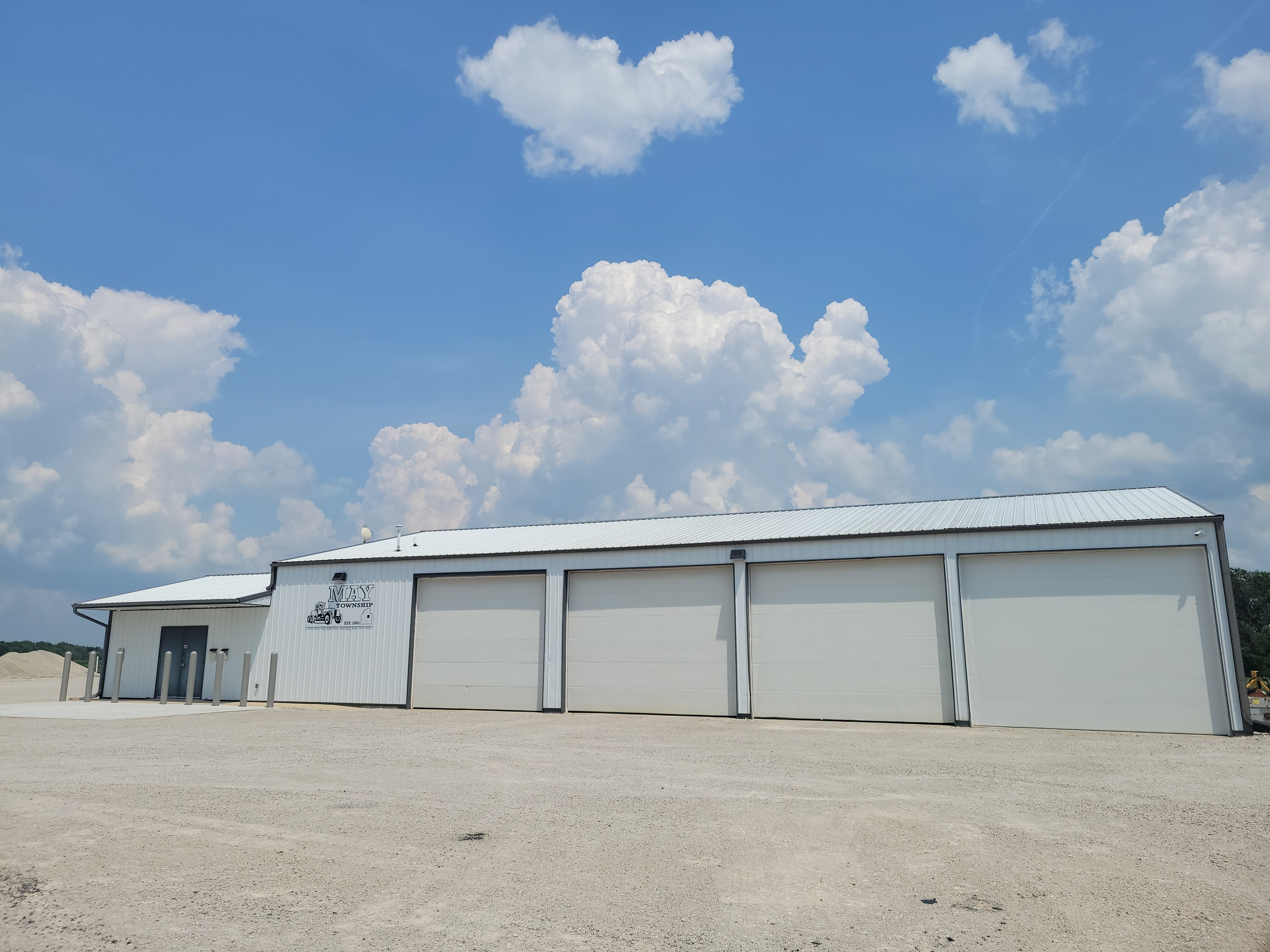
- Township building

- Location in Christian County

- Christian County's location in Illinois
- Coordinates: 39°33′54″N 89°11′35″W
- Country: United States
- State: Illinois
- County: Christian
- Established: November 7, 1865

Area
  - Total: 36.41 sq mi (94.3 km^{2})
  - Land: 36.34 sq mi (94.1 km^{2})
  - Water: 0.07 sq mi (0.18 km^{2}) 0.19%
- Elevation: 607 ft (185 m)

Population (2020)
  - Total: 1,760
  - Density: 48.4/sq mi (18.7/km^{2})
- Time zone: UTC-6 (CST)
  - Summer (DST): UTC-5 (CDT)
- ZIP codes: 62510, 62567, 62568
- FIPS code: 17-021-47631

May Township is one of seventeen townships in Christian County, Illinois, United States. As of the 2020 census, its population was 1,760 and it contained 774 housing units.

== History ==
May Township was established November 7, 1865, as Smith Township, but was later changed to Howard, then Penn, and finally to May. References as to when the name changes happened have been lost. It was named in honor of Colonel Charles May, of the artillery arm of the service in the Mexican–American War.

== Geography ==
According to the 2010 census, the township has a total area of 36.41 square miles (94.3 km^{2}), of which 36.34 square miles (94.1 km^{2}) (or 99.81%) is land and 0.07 square miles (0.18 km^{2}) (or 0.19%) is water.

The highest point in May Township is located approximately 20 feet south of the centerline of County Road 1600 North, at roughly 1816 East (.16 miles East of 1800 North Road, a/k/a Christian County Highway #7).

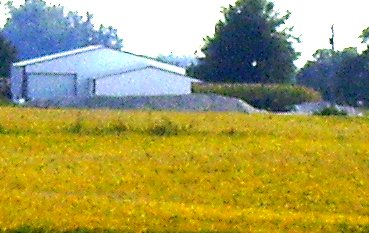
The May Township Road Department Office

=== Cities, towns, villages ===
- Taylorville (east edge)

=== Unincorporated towns ===
- Old Stonington at 39.611431°N 89.147861°W
- Willey Station at 39.596988°N 89.233419°W

=== Cemeteries ===
The township contains these four cemeteries: Fraley, Harris Number 2, Long and Tanner.

=== Major highways ===
- Illinois Route 29
- Illinois Route 48

=== Airports and landing strips ===
- Anselm Landing Strip

== Demographics ==
Historical population
Census	Pop.	Note	%±
1870	681		—
1880	793		16.4%
1890	864		9.0%
1900	885		2.4%
1910	832		−6.0%
1920	764		−8.2%
1930	670		−12.3%
1940	613		−8.5%
1950	617		0.7%
1960	741		20.1%
1970	1,013		36.7%
1980	1,468		44.9%
1990	1,307		−11.0%
2000	1,436		9.9%
2010	1,581		10.1%
2020	1,760		11.3%
U.S. Decennial Census

As of the 2020 census there were 1,760 people, 620 households, and 482 families residing in the township. The population density was 48.35 inhabitants per square mile (18.67/km^{2}). There were 774 housing units at an average density of 21.26 per square mile (8.21/km^{2}). The racial makeup of the township was 96.65% White, 0.28% African American, 0.23% Native American, 0.57% Asian, 0.00% Pacific Islander, 0.17% from other races, and 2.10% from two or more races. Hispanic or Latino of any race were 0.00% of the population.

There were 620 households, out of which 26.90% had children under the age of 18 living with them, 65.97% were married couples living together, 6.94% had a female householder with no spouse present, and 22.26% were non-families. 13.50% of all households were made up of individuals, and 8.20% had someone living alone who was 65 years of age or older. The average household size was 2.56 and the average family size was 2.91.

The township's age distribution consisted of 20.3% under the age of 18, 4.0% from 18 to 24, 18.8% from 25 to 44, 31% from 45 to 64, and 25.8% who were 65 years of age or older. The median age was 53.1 years. For every 100 females, there were 119.2 males. For every 100 females age 18 and over, there were 100.8 males.

The median income for a household in the township was $80,463, and the median income for a family was $81,481. Males had a median income of $66,679 versus $33,059 for females. The per capita income for the township was $48,246. About 1.0% of families and 3.2% of the population were below the poverty line, including none of those under age 18 and 2.2% of those age 65 or over.

== School districts ==
- Central A & M Community Unit School District 21
- Taylorville Community Unit School District 3

== Political districts ==
- State House District 87
- State House District 98
- State Senate District 44
- State Senate District 49
