= Buckhart Township, Illinois =

Buckhart Township, Illinois may refer to the following places:

- Buckhart Township, Christian County, Illinois
- Buckheart Township, Fulton County, Illinois (often misspelled Buckhart Township, Fulton County, Illinois)
