= Clarksdale =

Clarksdale may refer to some places in the United States:

- Clarksdale, Illinois, unincorporated community in Christian County
- Clarksdale, Mississippi, city in Coahoma County
- Clarksdale, Missouri, city in DeKalb County

== See also ==
- Clarkdale (disambiguation)
