= Locust Township =

Locust Township may refer to the following townships in the United States:

- Locust Township, Christian County, Illinois
- Locust Township, Columbia County, Pennsylvania
