= Locust Township, Christian County, Illinois =

Locust Township
- Township
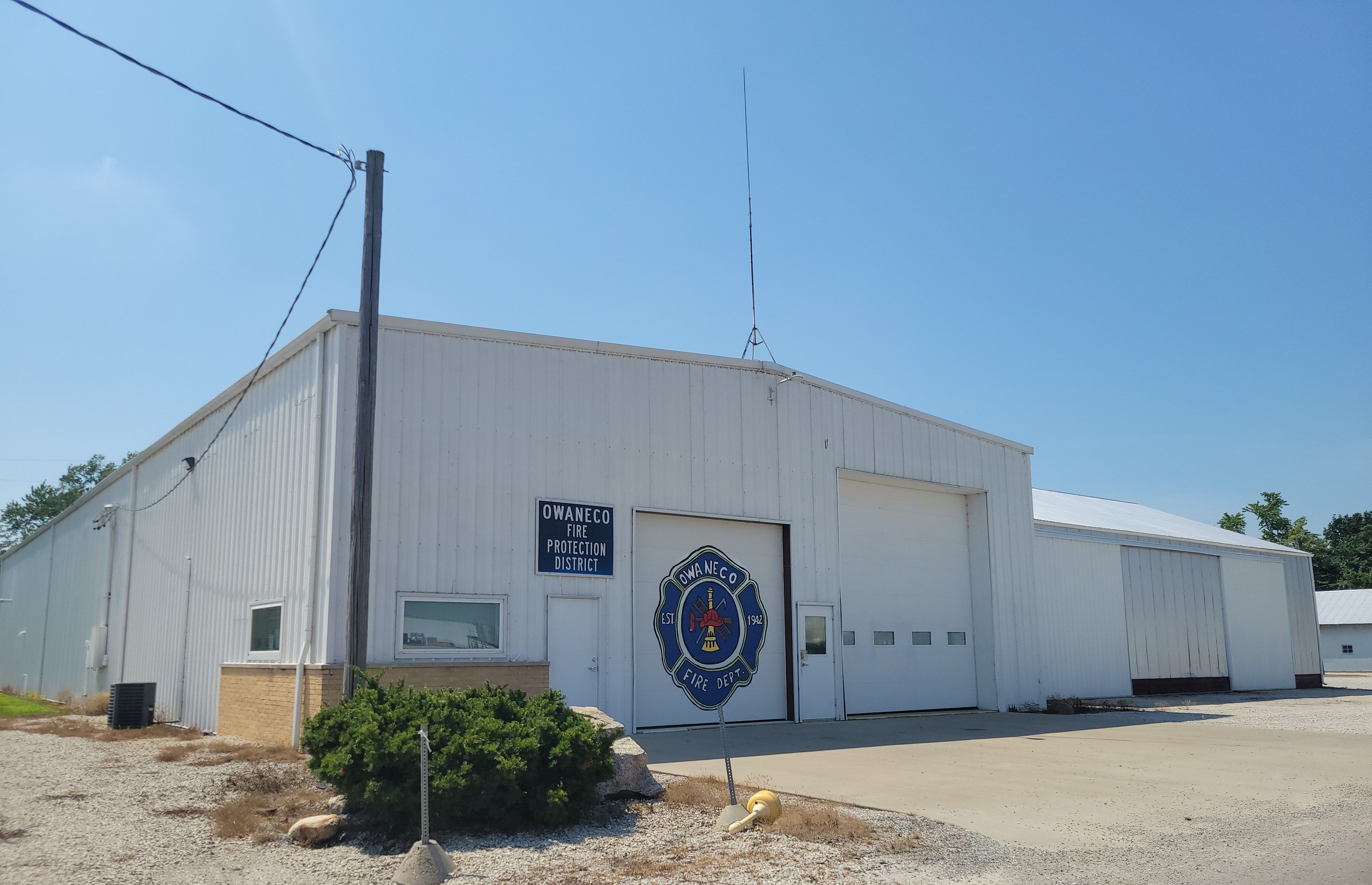
- Owaneco Fire Protection District building and adjacent Locust Township highway garage, in Owaneco.

- Location in Christian County

- Christian County's location in Illinois
- Coordinates: 39°28′51″N 89°11′39″W
- Country: United States
- State: Illinois
- County: Christian
- Established: November 7, 1865

Area
  - Total: 36.1 sq mi (93 km^{2})
  - Land: 35.84 sq mi (92.8 km^{2})
  - Water: 0.26 sq mi (0.67 km^{2}) 0.72%
- Elevation: 610 ft (190 m)

Population (2020)
  - Total: 3,137
  - Density: 87.53/sq mi (33.79/km^{2})
- Time zone: UTC-6 (CST)
  - Summer (DST): UTC-5 (CDT)
- ZIP codes: 62555, 62557, 62568
- FIPS code: 17-021-44251

Locust Township is one of seventeen townships in Christian County, Illinois, USA. As of the 2020 census, its population was 3,137 and it contained 249 housing units. Taylorville Correctional Center is located in the township.

== Geography ==
According to the 2010 census, the township has a total area of 36.1 square miles (93 km^{2}), of which 35.84 square miles (92.8 km^{2}) (or 99.28%) is land and 0.26 square miles (0.67 km^{2}) (or 0.72%) is water.

=== Cities, towns, villages ===
- Owaneco
- Taylorville (east edge)

=== Unincorporated towns ===
- Millersville at 39.451155°N 89.158140°W
- Velma at 39.514767°N 89.232588°W

=== Cemeteries ===
The township contains these cemeteries: Buckeye, Donner, Durbin, Millersville, Owaneco and County Poor Farm.

=== Major highways ===
- Illinois Route 29

=== Airports and landing strips ===
- Metsker Landing Strip

== Demographics ==
Historical population
Census	Pop.	Note	%±
1870	825		—
1880	1,329		61.1%
1890	1,254		−5.6%
1900	1,225		−2.3%
1910	1,159		−5.4%
1920	1,044		−9.9%
1930	953		−8.7%
1940	970		1.8%
1950	875		−9.8%
1960	762		−12.9%
1970	678		−11.0%
1980	745		9.9%
1990	656		−11.9%
2000	1,856		182.9%
2010	1,825		−1.7%
2020	3,137		71.9%
U.S. Decennial Census

As of the 2020 census there were 3,137 people residing in the township. Of these, 2,554 (or 81.4%) were incarcerated.

The population density was 86.86 inhabitants per square mile (33.54/km^{2}). There were 249 housing units at an average density of 6.89 per square mile (2.66/km^{2}). The racial makeup of the township was 71.53% White, 7.01% African American, 0.03% Native American, 0.57% Asian, 0.00% Pacific Islander, 20.43% from other races, and 0.41% from two or more races. Hispanic or Latino of any race were 22.41% of the population.

The non-incarcerated population was 553. There were 229 households, out of which 36.20% had children under the age of 18 living with them, 65.07% were married couples living together, 3.93% had a female householder with no spouse present, and 29.69% were non-families. 22.30% of all households were made up of individuals, and 6.10% had someone living alone who was 65 years of age or older. The average household size was 2.56 and the average family size was 3.01.

The township's age distribution consisted of 5.9% under the age of 18, 6.0% from 18 to 24, 40.7% from 25 to 44, 39.5% from 45 to 64, and 7.9% who were 65 years of age or older. The median age was 44.1 years. For every 100 females, there were 564.3 males. For every 100 females age 18 and over, there were 695.5 males.

The median income for a household in the township was $69,886, and the median income for a family was $86,042. Males had a median income of $41,638 versus $24,514 for females. The per capita income for the township was $13,064. No families and 8.2% of the population were below the poverty line, including none of those under age 18 and 1.6% of those age 65 or over.

== School districts ==
- Central A & M Community Unit School District 21
- Pana Community Unit School District 8
- Taylorville Community Unit School District 3

== Political districts ==
- State House District 98
- State Senate District 49
