= Buckhart Township, Christian County, Illinois =

Buckhart Township
- Township
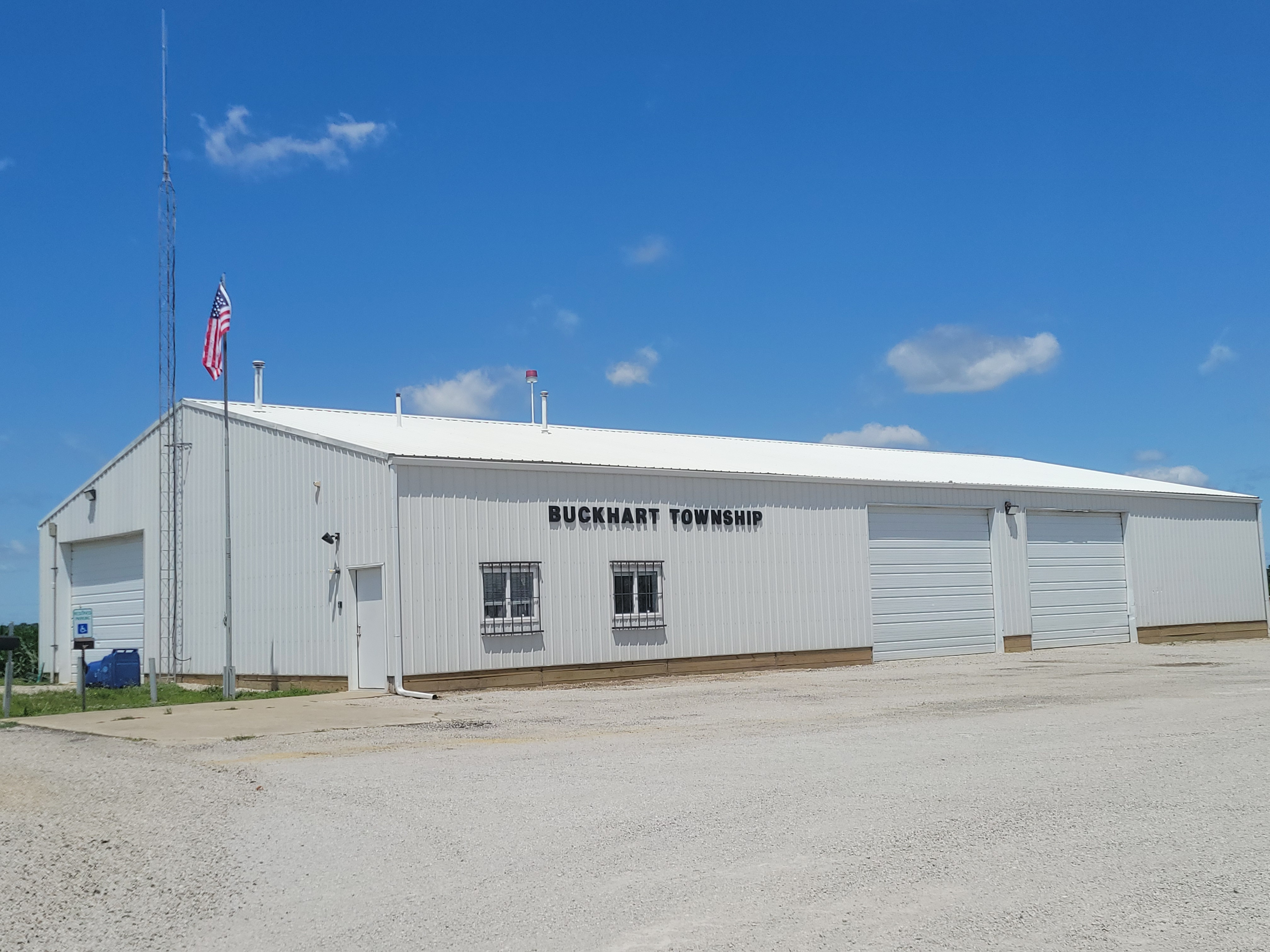
- Township government building near Edinburg

- Location in Christian County

- Christian County's location in Illinois
- Coordinates: 39°39′44″N 89°20′10″W
- Country: United States
- State: Illinois
- County: Christian
- Established: November 7, 1865

Area
  - Total: 58.75 sq mi (152.2 km^{2})
  - Land: 58.72 sq mi (152.1 km^{2})
  - Water: 0.03 sq mi (0.078 km^{2}) 0.05%
- Elevation: 600 ft (180 m)

Population (2020)
  - Total: 1,749
  - Density: 29.79/sq mi (11.50/km^{2})
- Time zone: UTC-6 (CST)
  - Summer (DST): UTC-5 (CDT)
- ZIP codes: 62513, 62531, 62567, 62568
- FIPS code: 17-021-09239

Buckhart Township is one of seventeen townships in Christian County, Illinois, United States. As of the 2020 census, its population is 1,749 and there are 818 housing units.

== Geography ==
According to the 2010 census, the township has a total area of 58.75 square miles (152.2 km^{2}), of which 58.72 square miles (152.1 km^{2}) (or 99.95%) is land and 0.03 square miles (0.078 km^{2}) (or 0.05%) is water.

=== Village ===
- Edinburg

=== Unincorporated towns ===
- Blueville at 39.66227°N 89.392034°W
- Sharpsburg at 39.613936°N 89.3512°W

=== Historical town ===
- Campbellsburg at 39.683659°N 89.420368°W

=== Cemeteries ===
- Bethel Baptist
- Buckhart Dutch Reform
- Edinburg
- Goode

=== Major highway ===
- Illinois Route 29

=== School districts ===
- Edinburg Community Unit School District 4
- Taylorville Community Unit School District 3

=== Political districts ===
- State House District 87
- State Senate District 44

== Demographics ==
Historical population
Census	Pop.	Note	%±
1870	2,028		—
1880	2,494		23.0%
1890	2,408		−3.4%
1900	2,671		10.9%
1910	2,047		−23.4%
1920	2,132		4.2%
1930	2,039		−4.4%
1940	2,076		1.8%
1950	1,985		−4.4%
1960	1,928		−2.9%
1970	2,007		4.1%
1980	2,114		5.3%
1990	1,730		−18.2%
2000	1,868		8.0%
2010	1,792		−4.1%
2020	1,749		−2.4%
U.S. Decennial Census

As of the 2020 census there were 1,749 people, 706 households, and 523 families residing in the township. The population density was 29.79 inhabitants per square mile (11.50/km^{2}). There were 818 housing units at an average density of 13.93 per square mile (5.38/km^{2}). The racial makeup of the township was 95.31% White, 0.17% African American, 0.29% Native American, 0.11% Asian, 0.00% Pacific Islander, 1.20% from other races, and 2.92% from two or more races. Hispanic or Latino of any race were 1.37% of the population.

There were 706 households, out of which 32.70% had children under the age of 18 living with them, 59.77% were married couples living together, 9.63% had a female householder with no spouse present, and 25.92% were non-families. 16.70% of all households were made up of individuals, and 10.80% had someone living alone who was 65 years of age or older. The average household size was 2.64 and the average family size was 2.96.

The township's age distribution consisted of 19.8% under the age of 18, 5.3% from 18 to 24, 27.8% from 25 to 44, 30.7% from 45 to 64, and 16.3% who were 65 years of age or older. The median age was 41.9 years. For every 100 females, there were 117.5 males. For every 100 females age 18 and over, there were 114.0 males.

The median income for a household in the township was $87,368, and the median income for a family was $93,098. Males had a median income of $43,107 versus $41,298 for females. The per capita income for the township was $34,813. About 7.8% of families and 9.5% of the population were below the poverty line, including 12.1% of those under age 18 and 12.5% of those age 65 or over.
