= Christian County, Illinois =

County in Illinois, United States

- County
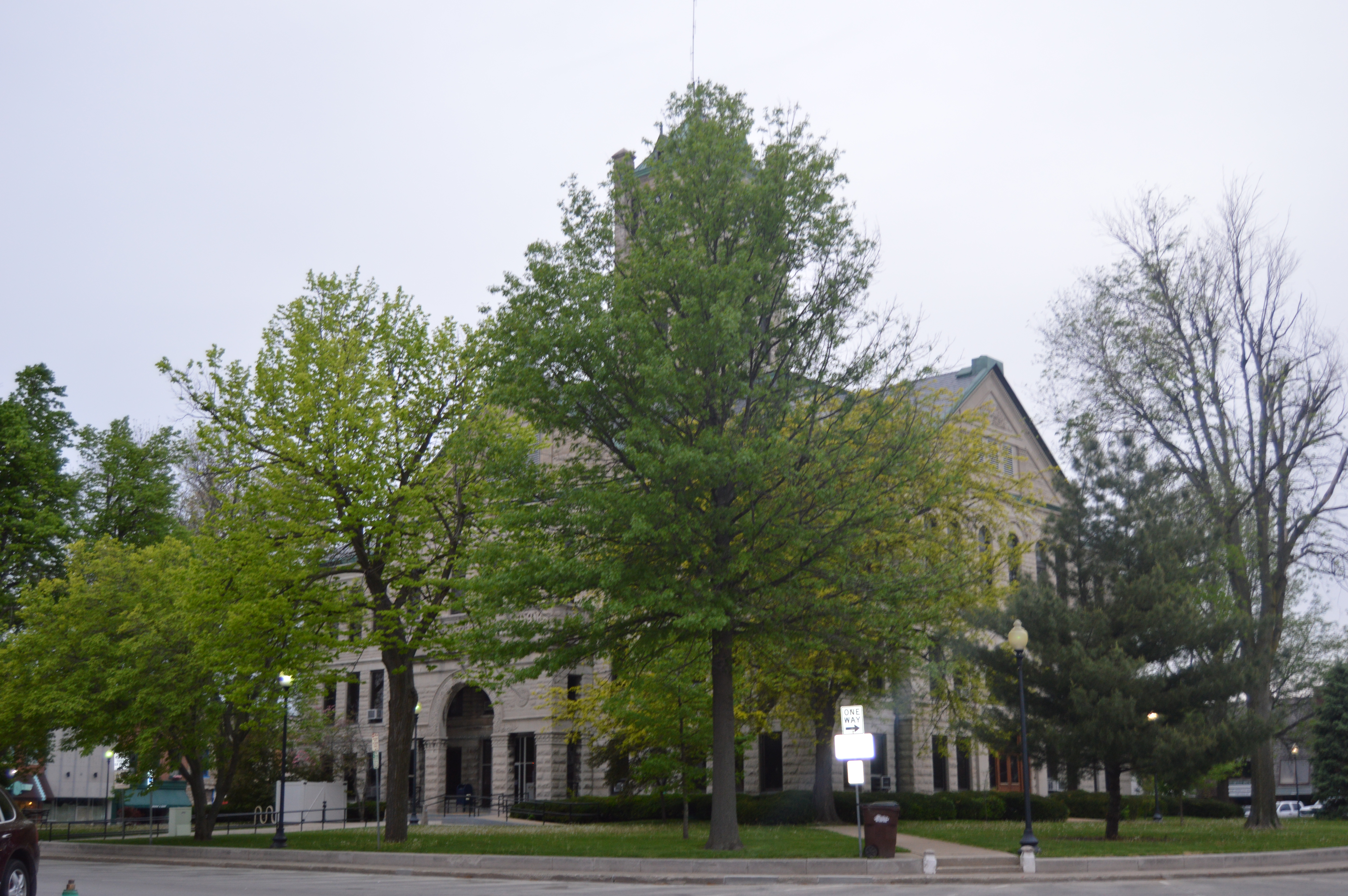
- Christian County Courthouse in Taylorville

- Location within the U.S. state of Illinois
- Coordinates: 39°33′N 89°17′W
- Country: United States
- State: Illinois
- Founded: 1839
- Named for: Christian County, Kentucky
- Seat: Taylorville
- Largest city: Taylorville

Area
  - Total: 716 sq mi (1,850 km^{2})
  - Land: 709 sq mi (1,840 km^{2})
  - Water: 6.3 sq mi (16 km^{2}) 0.9%

Population (2020)
  - Total: 34,032
  - Estimate (2025): 33,443 ▼
  - Density: 48.0/sq mi (18.5/km^{2})
- Time zone: UTC−6 (Central)
  - Summer (DST): UTC−5 (CDT)
- Congressional district: 15th
- Website: www.christiancountyil.gov

Christian County is a county located in the U.S. state of Illinois. As of the 2020 census, the population was 34,032. Its county seat is Taylorville.

The county was originally called Dane County.

== History ==
Christian County was formed February 15, 1839, out of Sangamon, Montgomery and Shelby counties. It was named for Christian County, Kentucky. It was originally named Dane County and was called Dane County until 1840.

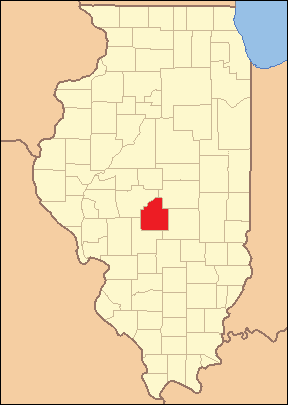
Christian County at its creation in 1839

== Geography ==
According to the U.S. Census Bureau, the county has a total area of 716 square miles (1,850 km^{2}), of which 709 square miles (1,840 km^{2}) is land and 6.3 square miles (16 km^{2}) (0.9%) is water. The county is bounded on the north by Sangamon River, and intersected by the south fork of that stream.

=== Adjacent counties ===
- Macon County (northeast)
- Shelby County (southeast)
- Montgomery County (southwest)
- Sangamon County (northwest)

=== Major highways ===
- US Route 51
- Illinois Route 16
- Illinois Route 29
- Illinois Route 48
- Illinois Route 104

== Climate and weather ==
Taylorville, Illinois

Climate chart (precipitation, max. and min. temperature)
J	F	M	A	M	J	J	A	S	O	N	D
1.8 32 16	1.8 39 21	3 50 31	3.5 63 41	3.8 74 52	3.7 83 61	3.7 86 65	2.8 85 63	2.8 79 54	2.3 67 42	3.6 51 33	2.4 38 22
- █ Average max. and min. temperatures in °F
- █ Precipitation totals in inches
- Source: The Weather Channel
Metric conversion
J	F	M	A	M	J	J	A	S	O	N	D
45 0 −9	45 4 −6	76 10 −1	88 17 5	96 23 11	93 28 16	93 30 18	70 29 17	72 26 12	59 19 6	91 11 1	62 3 −6
- █ Average max. and min. temperatures in °C
- █ Precipitation totals in mm

In recent years, average temperatures in the county seat of Taylorville have ranged from a low of 16 °F (−9 °C) in January to a high of 86 °F (30 °C) in July, although a record low of −23 °F (−31 °C) was recorded in January 1994 and a record high of 104 °F (40 °C) was recorded in August 1988. Average monthly precipitation ranged from 1.78 inches (45 mm) in January to 3.77 inches (96 mm) in May.

== Demographics ==
Historical population
Census	Pop.	Note	%±
1840	1,878		—
1850	3,203		70.6%
1860	10,492		227.6%
1870	20,363		94.1%
1880	28,227		38.6%
1890	30,531		8.2%
1900	32,790		7.4%
1910	34,594		5.5%
1920	38,458		11.2%
1930	37,538		−2.4%
1940	38,564		2.7%
1950	38,816		0.7%
1960	37,207		−4.1%
1970	35,948		−3.4%
1980	36,446		1.4%
1990	34,418		−5.6%
2000	35,372		2.8%
2010	34,800		−1.6%
2020	34,032		−2.2%
2025 (est.)	33,443	▼	−1.7%
U.S. Decennial Census; 1790-1960 1900-1990; 1990-2000 2010

2000 census age pyramid for Christian County

=== 2020 census ===
As of the 2020 census, the county had a population of 34,032. The median age was 43.5 years. 20.0% of residents were under the age of 18 and 20.7% of residents were 65 years of age or older. For every 100 females there were 111.6 males, and for every 100 females age 18 and over there were 113.8 males age 18 and over.

The racial makeup of the county was 92.4% White, 1.1% Black or African American, 0.2% American Indian and Alaska Native, 0.5% Asian, <0.1% Native Hawaiian and Pacific Islander, 2.3% from some other race, and 3.5% from two or more races. Hispanic or Latino residents of any race comprised 3.2% of the population.

49.3% of residents lived in urban areas, while 50.7% lived in rural areas.

There were 13,721 households in the county, of which 26.4% had children under the age of 18 living in them. Of all households, 44.8% were married-couple households, 19.8% were households with a male householder and no spouse or partner present, and 27.7% were households with a female householder and no spouse or partner present. About 33.1% of all households were made up of individuals and 16.1% had someone living alone who was 65 years of age or older.

There were 15,184 housing units, of which 9.6% were vacant. Among occupied housing units, 74.0% were owner-occupied and 26.0% were renter-occupied. The homeowner vacancy rate was 1.9% and the rental vacancy rate was 10.0%.

=== Racial and ethnic composition ===
Christian County, Illinois – Racial and ethnic composition Note: the US Census treats Hispanic/Latino as an ethnic category. This table excludes Latinos from the racial categories and assigns them to a separate category. Hispanics/Latinos may be of any race.
Race / Ethnicity (NH = Non-Hispanic)	Pop 1980	Pop 1990	Pop 2000	Pop 2010	Pop 2020	% 1980	% 1990	% 2000	% 2010	% 2020
White alone (NH)	36,143	34,095	33,921	33,331	31,226	99.17%	99.06%	95.90%	95.78%	91.75%
Black or African American alone (NH)	75	81	754	492	380	0.21%	0.24%	2.13%	1.41%	1.12%
Native American or Alaska Native alone (NH)	33	51	49	41	59	0.09%	0.15%	0.14%	0.12%	0.17%
Asian alone (NH)	56	87	131	165	179	0.15%	0.25%	0.37%	0.47%	0.53%
Native Hawaiian or Pacific Islander alone (NH)	x	x	9	7	1	x	x	0.03%	0.02%	0.00%
Other race alone (NH)	27	1	6	9	60	0.07%	0.00%	0.02%	0.03%	0.18%
Mixed race or Multiracial (NH)	x	x	157	284	1,033	x	x	0.44%	0.82%	3.04%
Hispanic or Latino (any race)	112	103	345	471	1,094	0.31%	0.30%	0.98%	1.35%	3.21%
Total	36,446	34,418	35,372	34,800	34,032	100.00%	100.00%	100.00%	100.00%	100.00%

=== 2010 census ===
As of the 2010 United States census, there were 34,800 people, 14,055 households, and 9,211 families residing in the county. The population density was 49.1 inhabitants per square mile (19.0/km^{2}). There were 15,563 housing units at an average density of 21.9 per square mile (8.5/km^{2}). The racial makeup of the county was 96.6% white, 1.4% black or African American, 0.5% Asian, 0.1% American Indian, 0.4% from other races, and 0.9% from two or more races. Those of Hispanic or Latino origin made up 1.4% of the population. In terms of ancestry, 21.9% were German, 12.7% were Irish, 10.6% were American, and 9.9% were English.

Of the 14,055 households, 30.1% had children under the age of 18 living with them, 50.1% were married couples living together, 10.3% had a female householder with no husband present, 34.5% were non-families, and 29.9% of all households were made up of individuals. The average household size was 2.36 and the average family size was 2.90. The median age was 41.6 years.

The median income for a household in the county was $41,712 and the median income for a family was $52,680. Males had a median income of $42,897 versus $30,027 for females. The per capita income for the county was $21,519. About 12.7% of families and 16.6% of the population were below the poverty line, including 28.6% of those under age 18 and 9.4% of those age 65 or over.

== Communities ==
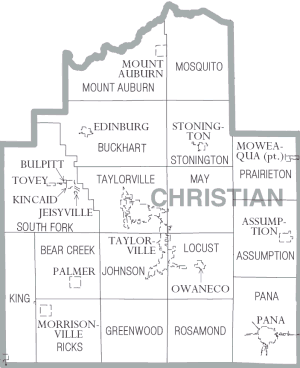
Map of Christian County, Illinois

=== Cities ===
- Assumption
- Pana
- Taylorville

=== Villages ===
- Bulpitt
- Edinburg
- Harvel
- Jeisyville
- Kincaid
- Morrisonville
- Mount Auburn
- Moweaqua
- Owaneco
- Palmer
- Stonington
- Tovey

=== Census-designated places ===
- Langleyville

=== Other unincorporated places ===
- Bolivia
- Clarksdale
- Dunkel
- Grove City
- Hewittsville
- Millersville
- Old Stonington
- Osbernville
- Radford
- Roby
- Rosamond
- Sharpsburg
- Sicily
- Vanderville
- Velma
- Willey Station
- Zenobia

=== Townships ===
Christian County is divided into these seventeen townships:

- Assumption
- Bear Creek
- Buckhart
- Greenwood
- Johnson
- King
- Locust
- May
- Mosquito
- Mount Auburn
- Pana
- Prairieton
- Ricks
- Rosamond
- South Fork
- Stonington
- Taylorville

== Notable people ==
- Jon Corzine, former governor of New Jersey, former resident of Willey Station.
- Roy A. Corzine (1882-1957), Illinois state representative and farmer, was born in Stonington.
- Harry Forrester, member of the Illinois Basketball Hall of Fame and Quincy University Hall of Fame.
- Brant Hansen, Christian radio host and author, graduated from high school in Assumption.
- Tom Candy Ponting (1824-1916), cattleman who drove the first herd of cattle from Texas to New York City
- Frank P. Sadler (1872–1931), Illinois state senator and lawyer, lived on a farm near Grove City.
- John Wesley Fribley (1906–2002), state senate (1934–1952), born in Pana
- Yvonne Craig (1937–2015) was born in Taylorville, Illinois. American actress renowned for her role as Barbara Gordon/Batgirl in the 1960s television series Batman.

== Politics ==
Like most of German-settled Central Illinois, Christian County was solidly Democratic until Woodrow Wilson’s response to German defeat in World War I turned the county over to the Republican Party in its 1920, 1924 and 1928 landslides. The county remained Democratic-leaning through the rest of the twentieth century, only voting Republican in landslide wins. However, since 2000 Christian County has become reliably Republican.

United States presidential election results for Christian County, Illinois
Year	Republican		Democratic		Third party(ies)	
Year	No.	%	No.	%	No.	%
1892	2,941	40.12%	3,655	49.86%	735	10.03%
1896	3,857	44.74%	4,639	53.82%	124	1.44%
1900	3,686	43.59%	4,519	53.44%	252	2.98%
1904	3,856	49.15%	3,297	42.02%	693	8.83%
1908	3,686	43.63%	4,156	49.19%	607	7.18%
1912	1,994	25.30%	3,821	48.48%	2,067	26.22%
1916	6,923	44.12%	7,982	50.87%	787	5.02%
1920	7,535	52.75%	5,398	37.79%	1,352	9.46%
1924	7,398	46.08%	5,826	36.29%	2,832	17.64%
1928	9,896	56.77%	7,345	42.14%	190	1.09%
1932	6,096	33.42%	11,515	63.12%	631	3.46%
1936	8,145	39.69%	11,400	55.55%	976	4.76%
1940	10,255	46.91%	11,457	52.41%	150	0.69%
1944	8,995	48.79%	9,360	50.77%	82	0.44%
1948	7,576	44.40%	9,366	54.89%	120	0.70%
1952	9,906	50.11%	9,844	49.80%	17	0.09%
1956	10,282	52.91%	9,093	46.79%	59	0.30%
1960	9,263	47.54%	10,207	52.38%	15	0.08%
1964	6,153	34.09%	11,898	65.91%	0	0.00%
1968	7,486	42.31%	8,465	47.84%	1,743	9.85%
1972	10,072	56.98%	7,556	42.75%	47	0.27%
1976	7,445	43.90%	9,306	54.87%	209	1.23%
1980	8,770	54.69%	6,625	41.31%	641	4.00%
1984	8,534	52.84%	7,541	46.69%	77	0.48%
1988	7,040	45.61%	8,295	53.74%	101	0.65%
1992	5,087	28.92%	9,042	51.40%	3,461	19.68%
1996	5,563	37.49%	7,431	50.08%	1,843	12.42%
2000	7,537	51.03%	6,799	46.03%	435	2.94%
2004	9,044	59.24%	6,112	40.03%	111	0.73%
2008	7,872	51.94%	6,918	45.65%	365	2.41%
2012	8,885	60.33%	5,494	37.31%	348	2.36%
2016	10,543	68.12%	3,992	25.79%	942	6.09%
2020	11,563	71.24%	4,335	26.71%	333	2.05%
2024	11,278	72.29%	4,026	25.81%	296	1.90%

== See also ==
- National Register of Historic Places listings in Christian County, Illinois
- List of counties in Illinois
