= Harry Forrester =

Harry Forrester may refer to:

- Harry Forrester (coach) (1922–2008), American basketball and baseball coach
- Harry Forrester (footballer) (born 1991), English footballer

== See also ==
- Henry Forrester (disambiguation)
