= Taylorville Township, Christian County, Illinois =

Taylorville Township
- Township
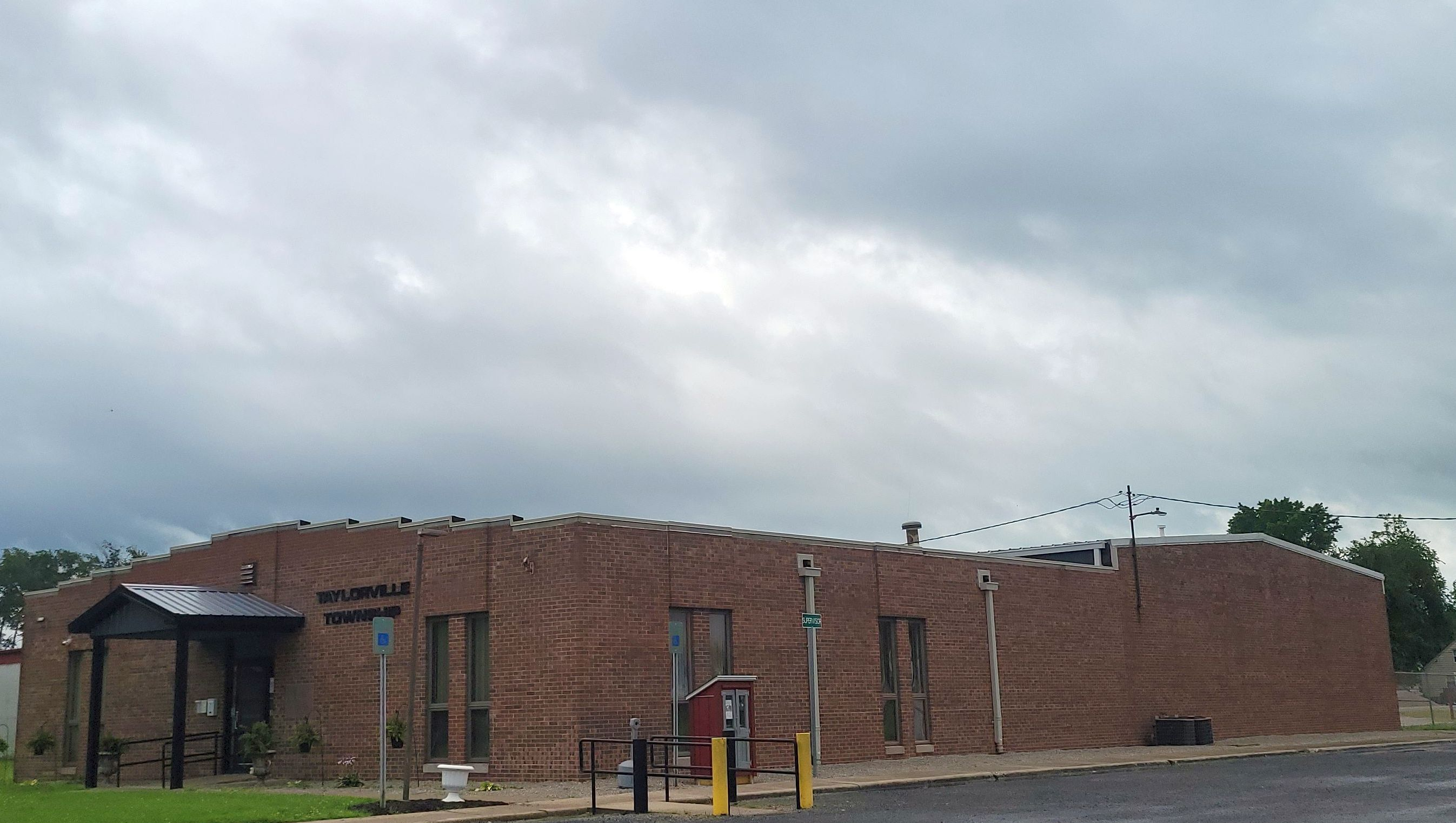
- Township building in Taylorville

- Location in Christian County

- Christian County's location in Illinois
- Coordinates: 39°34′04″N 89°19′04″W
- Country: United States
- State: Illinois
- County: Christian
- Established: November 7, 1865

Area
  - Total: 42.86 sq mi (111.0 km^{2})
  - Land: 42.56 sq mi (110.2 km^{2})
  - Water: 0.3 sq mi (0.78 km^{2}) 0.70%
- Elevation: 604 ft (184 m)

Population (2020)
  - Total: 11,539
  - Density: 271.1/sq mi (104.7/km^{2})
- Time zone: UTC-6 (CST)
  - Summer (DST): UTC-5 (CDT)
- ZIP codes: 62531, 62540, 62568
- FIPS code: 17-021-74587

Taylorville Township is one of seventeen townships in Christian County, Illinois, USA. As of the 2020 census, its population was 11,539 and it contained 5,801 housing units.

== Geography ==
According to the 2010 census, the township has a total area of 42.86 square miles (111.0 km^{2}), of which 42.56 square miles (110.2 km^{2}) (or 99.30%) is land and 0.3 square miles (0.78 km^{2}) (or 0.70%) is water.

=== Cities, towns, villages ===
- Taylorville (northern portion)

=== Unincorporated towns ===
- Langleyville at 39.56227°N 89.355368°W

=== Cemeteries ===
The township contains these four cemeteries: Glen Haven Memorial Gardens, Langley, Oak Hill and Young.

=== Major highways ===
- Illinois Route 29
- Illinois Route 48
- Illinois Route 104

=== Airports and landing strips ===
- Taylorville Municipal Airport

== Demographics ==
Historical population
Census	Pop.	Note	%±
1870	2,180		—
1880	3,322		52.4%
1890	4,038		21.6%
1900	5,725		41.8%
1910	7,213		26.0%
1920	8,369		16.0%
1930	9,946		18.8%
1940	11,065		11.3%
1950	12,486		12.8%
1960	12,172		−2.5%
1970	12,340		1.4%
1980	12,933		4.8%
1990	12,595		−2.6%
2000	12,659		0.5%
2010	12,483		−1.4%
2020	11,539		−7.6%
U.S. Decennial Census

As of the 2020 census there were 11,539 people, 5,398 households, and 2,765 families residing in the township. The population density was 269.63 inhabitants per square mile (104.10/km^{2}). There were 5,801 housing units at an average density of 135.55 per square mile (52.34/km^{2}). The racial makeup of the township was 93.91% White, 0.83% African American, 0.23% Native American, 0.79% Asian, 0.02% Pacific Islander, 0.53% from other races, and 3.69% from two or more races. Hispanic or Latino of any race were 1.56% of the population.

There were 5,398 households, out of which 26.20% had children under the age of 18 living with them, 38.37% were married couples living together, 9.73% had a female householder with no spouse present, and 48.78% were non-families. 42.10% of all households were made up of individuals, and 20.10% had someone living alone who was 65 years of age or older. The average household size was 2.11 and the average family size was 2.95.

The township's age distribution consisted of 21.0% under the age of 18, 6.1% from 18 to 24, 26.2% from 25 to 44, 26.1% from 45 to 64, and 20.5% who were 65 years of age or older. The median age was 42.5 years. For every 100 females, there were 84.1 males. For every 100 females age 18 and over, there were 79.4 males.

The median income for a household in the township was $42,471, and the median income for a family was $64,561. Males had a median income of $43,765 versus $26,250 for females. The per capita income for the township was $26,723. About 8.8% of families and 12.1% of the population were below the poverty line, including 12.3% of those under age 18 and 11.2% of those age 65 or over.

== School districts ==
- Edinburg Community Unit School District 4
- Taylorville Community Unit School District 3

== Political districts ==
- State House District 87
- State House District 98
- State Senate District 44
- State Senate District 49
