= Greenwood Township, Christian County, Illinois =

Greenwood Township
- Township
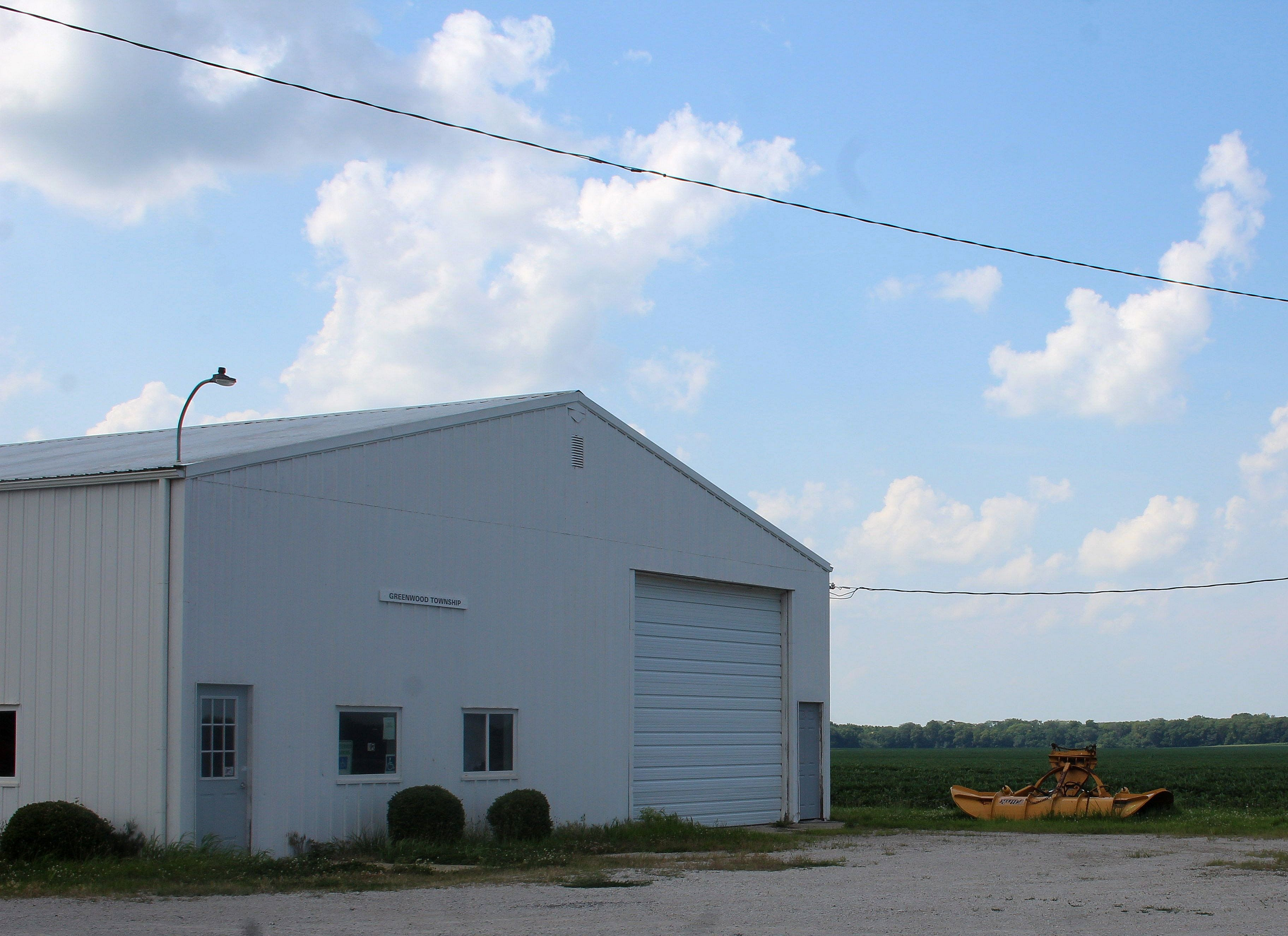
- Greenwood Township government building

- Location in Christian County

- Christian County's location in Illinois
- Coordinates: 39°23′59″N 89°18′16″W
- Country: United States
- State: Illinois
- County: Christian
- Established: November 7, 1865

Area
  - Total: 36.68 sq mi (95.0 km^{2})
  - Land: 36.68 sq mi (95.0 km^{2})
  - Water: 0 sq mi (0 km^{2}) 0%
- Elevation: 630 ft (192 m)

Population (2020)
  - Total: 200
  - Density: 5.5/sq mi (2.1/km^{2})
- Time zone: UTC-6 (CST)
  - Summer (DST): UTC-5 (CDT)
- ZIP codes: 62075, 62546, 62555, 62556, 62557
- FIPS code: 17-021-31641

Greenwood Township is one of seventeen townships in Christian County, Illinois, USA. As of the 2020 census, its population was 200 and it contained 95 housing units.

== Geography ==
According to the 2010 census, the township has a total area of 36.68 square miles (95.0 km^{2}), all land.

=== Unincorporated towns ===
- Vanderville at 39.425324°N 89.297588°W

=== Cemeteries ===
The township contains these four cemeteries: Antioch Methodist, Center Grove Methodist, Fairview Methodist and Kettlecamp Methodist.

=== Airports and landing strips ===
- Dahler Airport
- Dooley Field
- Kottwitz Landing Strip

== Demographics ==
Historical population
| Census | Pop. | Note | %± |
|---|---|---|---|
| 1870 | 776 | | — |
| 1880 | 1,073 | | 38.3% |
| 1890 | 1,075 | | 0.2% |
| 1900 | 952 | | −11.4% |
| 1910 | 797 | | −16.3% |
| 1920 | 700 | | −12.2% |
| 1930 | 583 | | −16.7% |
| 1940 | 599 | | 2.7% |
| 1950 | 462 | | −22.9% |
| 1960 | 440 | | −4.8% |
| 1970 | 381 | | −13.4% |
| 1980 | 279 | | −26.8% |
| 1990 | 242 | | −13.3% |
| 2000 | 232 | | −4.1% |
| 2010 | 208 | | −10.3% |
| 2020 | 200 | | −3.8% |
U.S. Decennial Census

As of the 2020 census there were 200 people, 83 households, and 71 families residing in the township. The population density was 5.45 inhabitants per square mile (2.10/km^{2}). There were 95 housing units at an average density of 2.59 per square mile (1.00/km^{2}). The racial makeup of the township was 94.00% White, 1.00% African American, 0.00% Native American, 0.00% Asian, 0.00% Pacific Islander, 1.50% from other races, and 3.50% from two or more races. Hispanic or Latino of any race were 1.00% of the population.

There were 83 households, out of which 56.60% had children under the age of 18 living with them, 28.92% were married couples living together, 8.43% had a female householder with no spouse present, and 14.46% were non-families. 14.50% of all households were made up of individuals, and 0.00% had someone living alone who was 65 years of age or older. The average household size was 2.40 and the average family size was 2.10.

The township's age distribution consisted of 28.1% under the age of 18, none from 18 to 24, 8.5% from 25 to 44, 56.8% from 45 to 64, and 6.5% who were 65 years of age or older. The median age was 51.7 years. For every 100 females, there were 59.2 males. For every 100 females age 18 and over, there were 107.2 males.

The median income for a household in the township was $64,122, and the median income for a family was $64,016. The per capita income for the township was $32,134. About 9.9% of families and 28.6% of the population were below the poverty line, including 21.4% of those under age 18 and none of those age 65 or over.

== School districts ==
- Morrisonville Community Unit School District 1
- Nokomis Community Unit School District 22
- Pana Community Unit School District 8
- Taylorville Community Unit School District 3

== Political districts ==
- State House District 98
- State Senate District 49
