= Assumption, Illinois =

- City
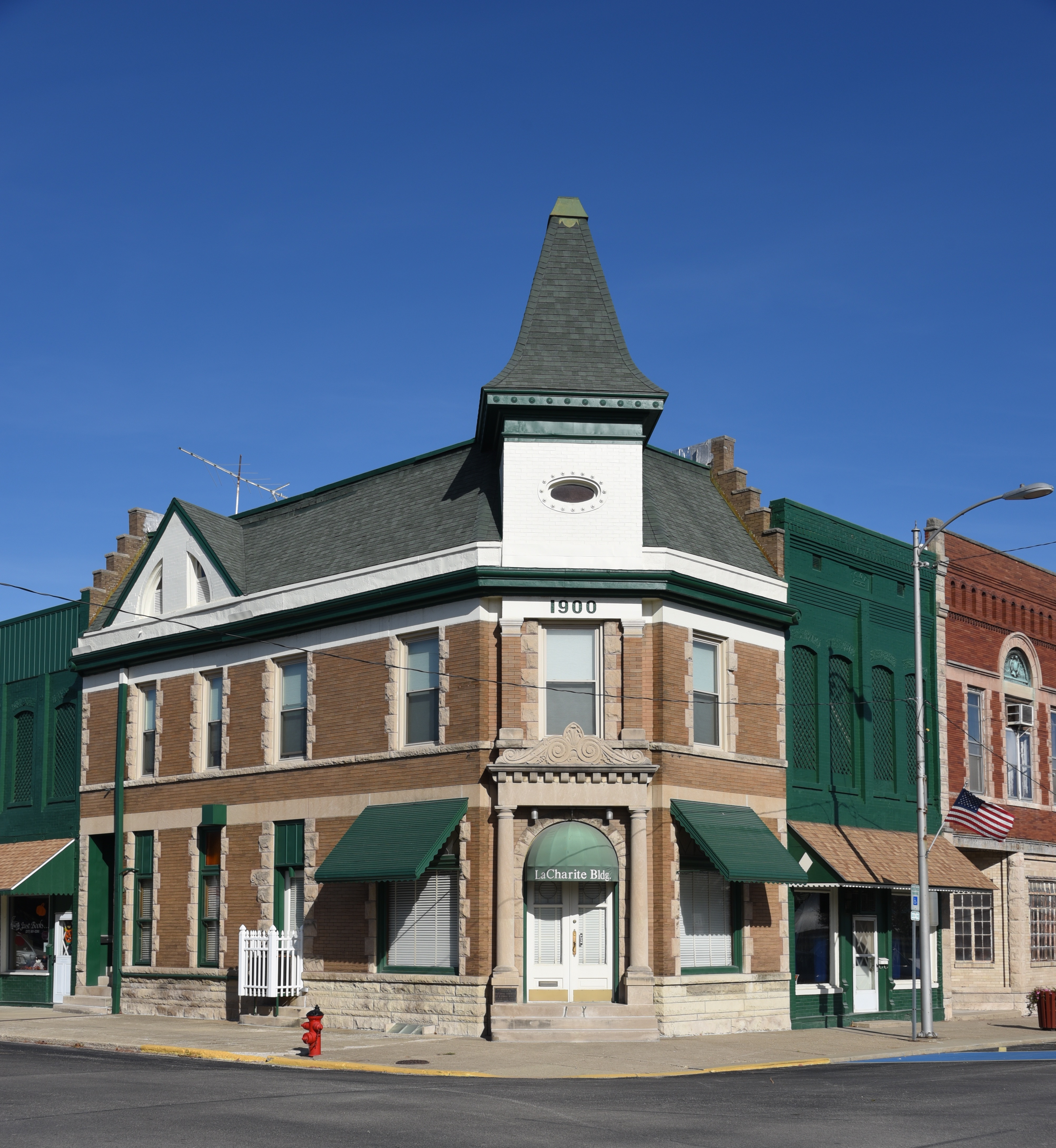
- The Illinois State Bank Building located at 201 N. Chestnut St.

- Location of Assumption in Christian County, Illinois.
- Coordinates: 39°31′05″N 89°02′52″W
- Country: United States
- State: Illinois
- County: Christian
- Township: Assumption

Area
  - Total: 0.99 sq mi (2.56 km^{2})
  - Land: 0.99 sq mi (2.56 km^{2})
  - Water: 0 sq mi (0.00 km^{2})
- Elevation: 640 ft (200 m)

Population (2020)
  - Total: 1,155
  - Density: 1,166.6/sq mi (450.42/km^{2})
- Time zone: UTC-6 (CST)
  - Summer (DST): UTC-5 (CDT)
- ZIP Code(s): 62510
- Area codes: 217. 447
- FIPS code: 17-02609
- GNIS ID: 2394007
- Website: cityofassumption.org

Assumption is a small town in Christian County, Illinois, United States. The population was 1,155 as of the 2020 census.

== History ==
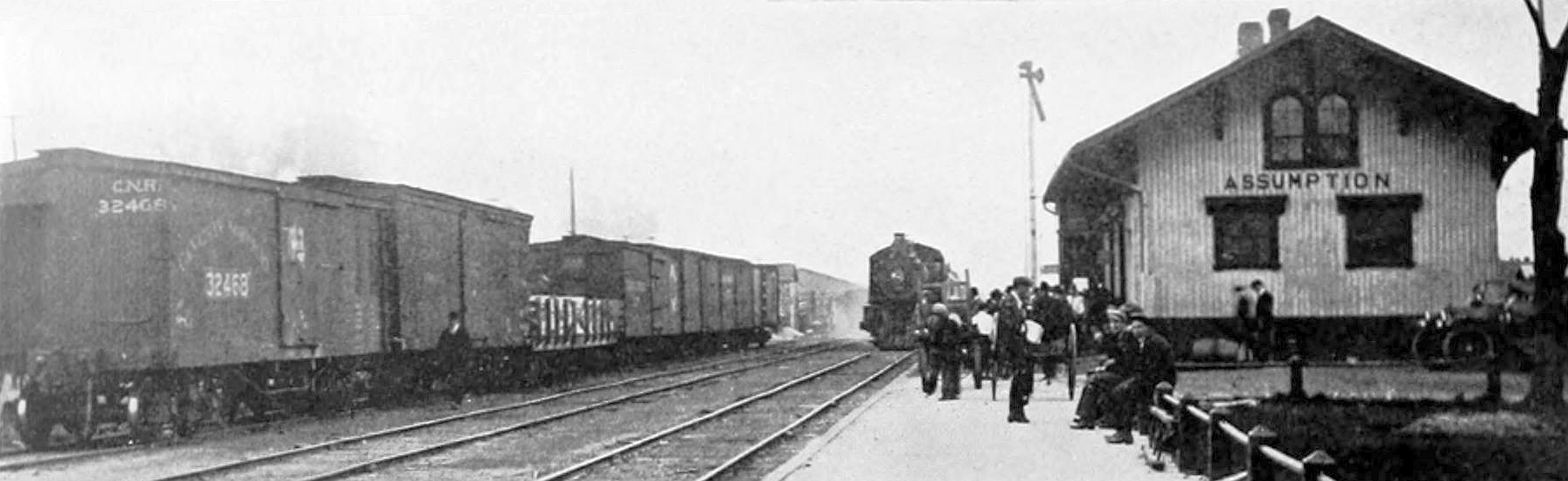
Illinois Central Railroad depot in Assumption, 1913

Assumption began in 1852 as a station called "Tacusah" or "Tacusa" on the Illinois Central Railroad. The present name is after Assumption Parish, Louisiana. In 1856, Édouard-Élisée Malhiot, a French Canadian Patriote leader who had been living in exile in Louisiana, established a settlement near the Tacusa station that attracted approximately 50 emigrant French Canadian families. He named the settlement L'Assomption after the Louisiana parish. The post office name changed to Assumption in 1858. The community was incorporated as the City of Assumption in 1876.

Assumption lays claim to the deepest coal mine (abandoned in the 1930s) in the state at over 1,000 feet (300 m) below the surface. The First National Bank of Assumption (founded in 1900) claims to be the oldest bank in Christian County as it was the only bank in the county to remain open during the Great Depression.

In May 2017, news reached Assumption of the recovery of the remains of United States Air Force Captain Joseph S. Smith, a pilot shot down over Cambodia in 1971 during the Vietnam War. A large portion of the community turned out for his repatriation and interment in July 2017.

== Geography ==
According to the 2020 census, Assumption has a total area of 0.88 square miles (2.28 km^{2}), all land.

== Demographics ==
Historical population
Census	Pop.	Note	%±
1870	590		—
1880	706		19.7%
1890	1,076		52.4%
1900	1,702		58.2%
1910	1,918		12.7%
1920	1,852		−3.4%
1930	1,554		−16.1%
1940	1,561		0.5%
1950	1,466		−6.1%
1960	1,439		−1.8%
1970	1,487		3.3%
1980	1,283		−13.7%
1990	1,244		−3.0%
2000	1,261		1.4%
2010	1,168		−7.4%
2020	1,155		−1.1%
U.S. Decennial Census

=== 2020 census ===
As of the 2020 census, Assumption had a population of 1,155. The population density was 1,166.67 inhabitants per square mile (450.45/km^{2}), and there were 576 housing units at an average density of 581.82 per square mile (224.64/km^{2}). Of the city's residents, 0.0% lived in urban areas and 100.0% lived in rural areas.

The median age was 42.1 years. 21.1% of residents were under the age of 18 and 18.4% were 65 years of age or older. For every 100 females, there were 92.2 males, and for every 100 females age 18 and over, there were 93.0 males age 18 and over.

There were 520 households in the city, as well as 262 families. Of those households, 26.3% had children under the age of 18 living in them. Of all households, 38.8% were married-couple households, 23.7% were households with a male householder and no spouse or partner present, and 29.4% were households with a female householder and no spouse or partner present. About 37.5% of all households were made up of individuals and 16.0% had someone living alone who was 65 years of age or older.

There were 576 housing units, of which 9.7% were vacant. The homeowner vacancy rate was 1.5% and the rental vacancy rate was 11.6%.

Racial composition as of the 2020 census
Race	Number	Percent
White	1,088	94.2%
Black or African American	6	0.5%
American Indian and Alaska Native	0	0.0%
Asian	2	0.2%
Native Hawaiian and Other Pacific Islander	0	0.0%
Some other race	3	0.3%
Two or more races	56	4.8%
Hispanic or Latino (of any race)	23	2.0%

=== Income and poverty ===
The median income for a household in the city was $46,563, and the median income for a family was $57,083. Males had a median income of $32,692 versus $20,761 for females. The per capita income for the city was $24,281. About 12.6% of families and 10.3% of the population were below the poverty line, including 13.8% of those under age 18 and 13.5% of those age 65 or over.

== Education ==
Until 1992, Assumption was served by the Assumption School District #9. Since 1992, Assumption has been served by the Central A&M School District, which also includes the village of Moweaqua, as well as the nearby rural areas. Central A&M Middle School (grades 6–8) and Bond Elementary School (preK-2) are located in Assumption, as well as the school district office.

Enrollment at the middle school is approximately 170 students.

Assumption is also home to Kemmerer Village, a private Presbyterian childcare agency, named for donor Philip Kemmerer who willed 400 acres (1.6 km^{2}) to "the orphans and friendless poor of all denominations" in 1884. Originally known as Kemmerer Orphan Home, the facility opened in 1914. In 1930, the named was changed to Kemmerer Children's Home. Eventually the name became Kemmerer Village.

== Notable people ==
- Lloyd Burdick, football player
- James T. Carroll, Los Angeles City Council member, 1933, born in Assumption
- John Dudra, MLB infielder for the Boston Braves, was born in Assumption in 1916
- Brant Hansen, radio personality, graduated from Assumption High School, 1987
