= Dunkel, Illinois =

- Unincorporated community
- Location within Illinois Location within the United States
- Coordinates: 39°28′05″N 89°03′46″W
- Country: United States
- State: Illinois
- County: Christian
- Township: Assumption
- Settled: 1877
- Elevation: 663 ft (202 m)
- Time zone: UTC-6 (CST)
  - Summer (DST): UTC-5 (CDT)
- ZIP code: 62557
- Area code: 217
- GNIS ID: 422641

Dunkel is an unincorporated community in Assumption Township, Christian County, Illinois, United States.

Dunkel was laid out in 1876. Dunkel's post office was established May 4, 1877 and disestablished August 31, 1902; the community is now served by the Pana post office. It was situated along the Illinois Central Railroad. It was named for Elias Dunkel, a railroad employee. All that remains of Dunkel today are a few houses and a grain elevator operated by nearby Assumption Co-Op.
