= Rosamond, Illinois =

- Unincorporated community
- Location within Illinois Location within the United States
- Coordinates: 39°22′47″N 89°09′37″W
- Country: United States
- State: Illinois
- County: Christian
- Elevation: 709 ft (216 m)
- Time zone: UTC-6 (Central (CST))
  - Summer (DST): UTC-5 (CDT)
- ZIP code: 62083
- Area code: 217
- GNIS feature ID: 416931

Rosamond is an unincorporated community in Rosamond Township, Christian County, Illinois, United States. It lies at 39.380°N 89.162°W.

== History ==
The earliest known local resident was Capt. Alfred Cowgill who settled in the area in 1856. Cowgill moved to Assumption for a few years, returning to Rosamond where he worked for grain dealer S.M. Hawood & Son. After moving to Montrose, Mo., he returned to Rosamond and worked for Hawood & Son until 1878.

He then worked for J.B. Waddington in Rosamond. Then he worked for Joel Beckwith in the grain business for two years, after which he entered the employ of S. M. Hawood & Son, grain dealers, as manager. In 1874, he came to Rosamond and carried on the grain business for that firm for two years. His residence changed again in 1876 when he went to Montrose, Mo., where he dealt in grain for a year. He then returned to Rosamond and re-entered the employ of Hawood & Son, with whom he continued until 1878. Since 1891 he has been connected with J. B. Waddington in the grain business, and the firm is now enjoying a good trade.

In 1856, two new settlers arrived. L.S. Gardner started as a farmer. In 1890, Rosamond had grown large enough to have a Poor Farm. Gardner and his wife became caretakers of the operation.

Orlando Manvill Hawkes arrived the same year. He was a farmer and a member of the now-defunct First Congregational Church of Rosamond.

A year later, Wesley Simpson arrived and turned hundreds of acres of prairie into farmland.

There are no other documented arrivals until 1865 when Phineas Leech Dodge arrived. By 1880, Dodge owned the grain elevator in Rosamond. He was also a member of the First Congregational Church of Rosamond.

A year after Dodge arrived the church added Lyman Wilcox as a member. Wilcox served as Sunday School for sixty years. He was a lifelong farmer.

William W. Bailey began farming 200 acres (0.81 km^{2}) in the township in 1867. By 1868, Rosamond could boast of a Justice of the Peace and Notary Public, with Charles H. Hill serving in both capacities.

C.G. Richards became a local farmer in 1868. He served as Deacon and Trustee in the First Congregational Church of Rosamond. The church added another member when Benjamin Franklin Carper arrived in 1869 and became a local stock-raiser. Robert Watt arrived in Christian County in 1852 and worked as a farmhand in the county. Watt purchased his Rosamond farm in 1872. In 1873, William Grimes arrived and began farming in the area.

Moses Hutchins arrived in 1875 and began raising livestock. He joined the First Congregational Church of Rosamond and served as a Trustee.

In 1881, J.B. Waddington arrived. In addition to farming, he opened a grain elevator in Rosamond.
