= Clarkdale =

Clarkdale may refer to:

- Clarkdale, Arizona
- Clarkdale, California
- Clarkdale, Georgia
- Clarkdale (microprocessor)

== See also ==
- Clarksdale (disambiguation)
- Clarkedale, Arkansas
