= Hewittsville, Illinois =

- Unincorporated community
- Location within Illinois Location within the United States
- Coordinates: 39°32′10″N 89°13′00″W
- Country: United States
- State: Illinois
- County: Christian
- Elevation: 614 ft (187 m)
- Time zone: UTC-6 (Central (CST))
  - Summer (DST): UTC-5 (CDT)
- Area code: 217
- GNIS feature ID: 424154

Hewittsville (also known as Hewittville) is an unincorporated community in Christian County, Illinois, United States. It lies at 39°32′10″N 89°13′00″W.
