= Zenobia, Illinois =

- Unincorporated community
- Location within Illinois Location within the United States
- Coordinates: 39°31′43″N 89°32′1″W
- Country: United States
- State: Illinois
- County: Christian, Montgomery, Sangamon
- Elevation: 614 ft (187 m)
- Time zone: UTC-6 (Central (CST))
  - Summer (DST): UTC-5 (CDT)
- Area code: 217
- GNIS feature ID: 423347

Zenobia is an unincorporated community in Christian, Montgomery, and Sangamon counties in the U.S. state of Illinois. It lies at 39°31′43″N 89°32′1″W.
