= Henry Forrester =

Henry Forrester may refer to:

- Henry Forrester, fictional character in List of Hollyoaks characters (2013)
- Sir Henry Forrester, fictional character in Stanley and Livingstone

== See also ==
- Harry Forrester (disambiguation)
