= Mount Auburn, Illinois =

Mount Auburn
- Village
- Location of Mount Auburn in Christian County, Illinois.
- Coordinates: 39°45′54″N 89°15′39″W
- Country: United States
- State: Illinois
- County: Christian

Government
  - Mayor: Mike Whitehead

Area
  - Total: 1.00 sq mi (2.58 km^{2})
  - Land: 1.00 sq mi (2.58 km^{2})
  - Water: 0 sq mi (0.00 km^{2})
- Elevation: 679 ft (207 m)

Population (2020)
  - Total: 452
  - Density: 453.5/sq mi (175.09/km^{2})
- Time zone: UTC-6 (CST)
  - Summer (DST): UTC-5 (CDT)
- ZIP Code(s): 62547
- Area code: 217
- FIPS code: 17-50829
- GNIS ID: 2399406
- Website: villagemtauburn.net

Mount Auburn is a village in Christian County, Illinois, United States. The population was 452 at the 2020 census.

== History ==
Mount Auburn was founded on July 11, 1839. It was seriously considered as possibility for the state capital at the time the center of government was moved from Vandalia to Springfield.

== Geography ==
According to the 2021 census gazetteer files, Mount Auburn has a total area of 1.00 square mile (2.59 km^{2}), of which 1.00 square mile (2.59 km^{2}) (or 99.90%) is land and 0.00 square miles (0.00 km^{2}) (or 0.10%) is water.

== Demographics ==
Historical population
Census	Pop.	Note	%±
1880	208		—
1890	222		6.7%
1900	235		5.9%
1910	463		97.0%
1920	492		6.3%
1930	380		−22.8%
1940	471		23.9%
1950	414		−12.1%
1960	502		21.3%
1970	520		3.6%
1980	598		15.0%
1990	544		−9.0%
2000	515		−5.3%
2010	480		−6.8%
2020	452		−5.8%
U.S. Decennial Census

As of the 2020 census there were 452 people, 273 households, and 172 families residing in the village. The population density was 452.91 inhabitants per square mile (174.87/km^{2}). There were 215 housing units at an average density of 215.43 per square mile (83.18/km^{2}). The racial makeup of the village was 93.14% White, 0.22% African American, 0.66% Asian, 1.33% from other races, and 4.65% from two or more races. Hispanic or Latino of any race were 0.66% of the population.

There were 273 households, out of which 40.3% had children under the age of 18 living with them, 58.61% were married couples living together, 1.83% had a female householder with no husband present, and 37.00% were non-families. 27.11% of all households were made up of individuals, and 12.45% had someone living alone who was 65 years of age or older. The average household size was 2.91 and the average family size was 2.36.

The village's age distribution consisted of 22.8% under the age of 18, 5.9% from 18 to 24, 39.2% from 25 to 44, 23.3% from 45 to 64, and 8.9% who were 65 years of age or older. The median age was 38.7 years. For every 100 females, there were 119.0 males. For every 100 females age 18 and over, there were 95.7 males.

The median income for a household in the village was $49,904, and the median income for a family was $67,717. Males had a median income of $31,250 versus $29,479 for females. The per capita income for the village was $22,930. About 4.1% of families and 9.0% of the population were below the poverty line, including none of those under age 18 and 7.0% of those age 65 or over.
