= Illinois State Bank Building =

- U.S. National Register of Historic Places
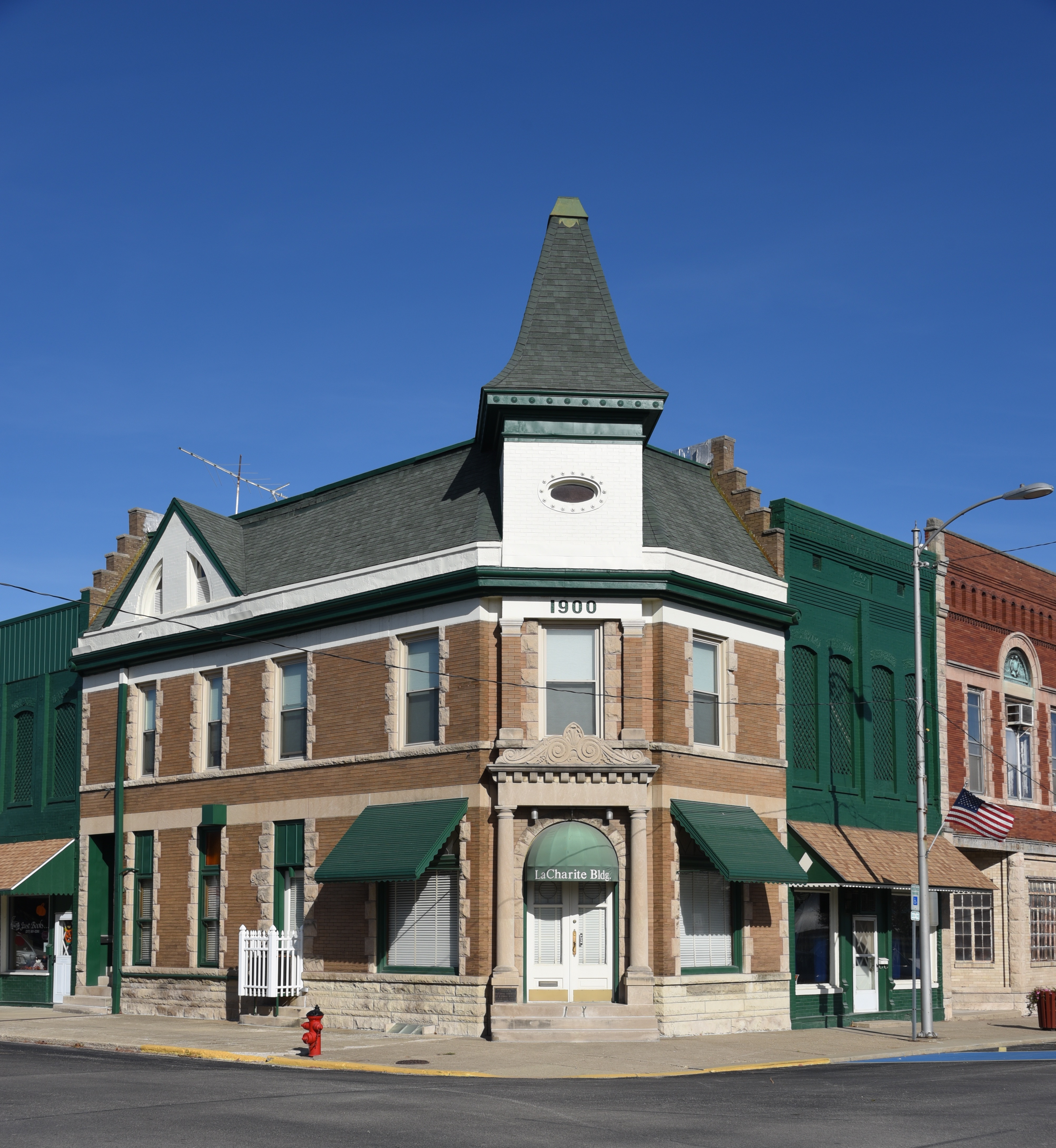

- Location within Illinois Location within the United States
- Location: 201 N. Chestnut St., Assumption, Illinois
- Coordinates: 39°31′14″N 89°2′58″W
- Area: less than one acre
- Built: 1900
- Architect: Tobias, Ira
- NRHP reference No.: 84000923
- Added to NRHP: August 16, 1984

The Illinois State Bank Building is a historic bank building located at 201 N. Chestnut St. in Assumption, Illinois. The building was constructed in 1900 to replace the Illinois State Bank's previous building, an 1883 structure which burned down in 1899. Local architect Ira Tobias designed the bank, which features a tower above its front entrance; such towers were a distinguishing mark of Tobias' work and can be seen on two other surviving buildings in Assumption. The Illinois State Bank operated from the building until its closure in 1933; during this time, it handled 80-85% of Assumption's banking business. The building later housed the Assumption Building and Loan Association and the law offices of George J. LaCharite.

The building was added to the National Register of Historic Places on August 16, 1984.
