= Assumption Township, Christian County, Illinois =

Assumption Township
- Township
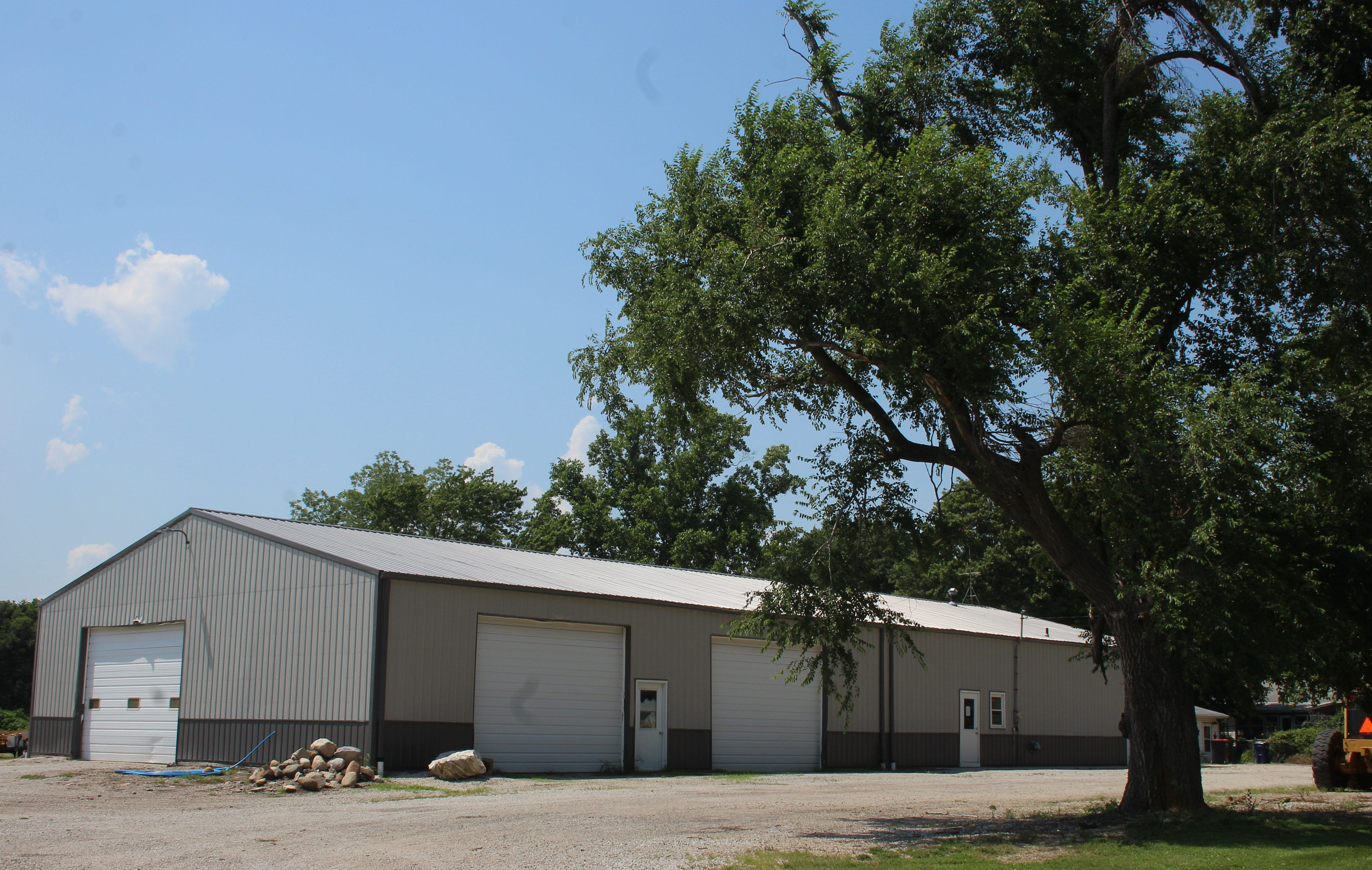
- Township government building in Assumption.

- Location in Christian County

- Christian County's location in Illinois
- Coordinates: 39°31′N 89°5′W
- Country: United States
- State: Illinois
- County: Christian
- Established: November 7, 1865

Area
  - Total: 42.84 sq mi (111.0 km^{2})
  - Land: 42.84 sq mi (111.0 km^{2})
  - Water: 0 sq mi (0 km^{2}) 0%
- Elevation: 633 ft (193 m)

Population (2020)
  - Total: 1,345
  - Density: 31.40/sq mi (12.12/km^{2})
- Time zone: UTC-6 (CST)
  - Summer (DST): UTC-5 (CDT)
- ZIP codes: 62510, 62550, 62555, 62557
- FIPS code: 17-021-02622

Assumption Township is one of seventeen townships in Christian County, Illinois, United States. As of the 2020 census, its population was 1,345 and it contained 656 housing units.

== Geography ==
According to the 2010 census, the township has a total area of 42.84 square miles (111.0 km^{2}), all land.

=== Cities, towns, villages ===
- Assumption

=== Unincorporated towns ===
- Dunkel at 39.4681°N 89.0629°W

=== Cemeteries ===
The township contains Saint Marys Cemetery, Greenwood Cemetery and Pleasant View Cemetery, all located in the City of Assumption

=== Major highways ===
- U.S. Route 51

== Demographics ==
Historical population
Census	Pop.	Note	%±
1870	1,246		—
1880	1,758		41.1%
1890	2,095		19.2%
1900	2,670		27.4%
1910	2,803		5.0%
1920	2,791		−0.4%
1930	2,394		−14.2%
1940	2,218		−7.4%
1950	2,048		−7.7%
1960	1,998		−2.4%
1970	1,980		−0.9%
1980	1,645		−16.9%
1990	1,595		−3.0%
2000	1,509		−5.4%
2010	1,418		−6.0%
2020	1,345		−5.1%
U.S. Decennial Census

As of the 2020 census there were 1,345 people, 707 households, and 302 families residing in the township. The population density was 31.39 inhabitants per square mile (12.12/km^{2}). There were 656 housing units at an average density of 15.31 per square mile (5.91/km^{2}). The racial makeup of the township was 93.09% White, 0.89% African American, 0.00% Native American, 0.30% Asian, 0.00% Pacific Islander, 0.22% from other races, and 5.50% from two or more races. Hispanic or Latino of any race were 2.16% of the population.

There were 707 households, out of which 23.60% had children under the age of 18 living with them, 30.83% were married couples living together, 9.05% had a female householder with no spouse present, and 57.28% were non-families. 42.00% of all households were made up of individuals, and 26.00% had someone living alone who was 65 years of age or older. The average household size was 2.01 and the average family size was 2.88.

The township's age distribution consisted of 19.7% under the age of 18, 15.8% from 18 to 24, 16.9% from 25 to 44, 24.6% from 45 to 64, and 23.0% who were 65 years of age or older. The median age was 41.2 years. For every 100 females, there were 122.4 males. For every 100 females age 18 and over, there were 126.1 males.

The median income for a household in the township was $45,359, and the median income for a family was $59,259. Males had a median income of $37,500 versus $22,143 for females. The per capita income for the township was $25,208. About 10.9% of families and 9.9% of the population were below the poverty line, including 12.5% of those under age 18 and 10.1% of those age 65 or over.

== School districts ==
- Central A & M Community Unit School District 21
- Pana Community Unit School District 8

== Political districts ==
- State House District 98
- State Senate District 49
