= Sharpsburg, Illinois =

- Unincorporated community
- Location within Illinois Location within the United States
- Coordinates: 39°36′50″N 89°21′04″W
- Country: United States
- State: Illinois
- County: Christian
- Elevation: 600 ft (180 m)
- Time zone: UTC-6 (Central (CST))
  - Summer (DST): UTC-5 (CDT)
- Area code: 217
- GNIS feature ID: 418298

Sharpsburg (also Sharpsburgh) is an unincorporated community in Christian County, Illinois, United States. It is the birthplace of Native American scholar John Neihardt, author of Black Elk Speaks and many other works.
