= Edinburg, Illinois =

Edinburg
- Village
- Nickname: E-Burg
- Location of Edinburg in Christian County, Illinois.
- Coordinates: 39°39′28″N 89°23′24″W
- Country: United States
- State: Illinois
- County: Christian

Area
  - Total: 0.63 sq mi (1.62 km^{2})
  - Land: 0.63 sq mi (1.62 km^{2})
  - Water: 0 sq mi (0.00 km^{2})
- Elevation: 597 ft (182 m)

Population (2020)
  - Total: 1,085
  - Density: 1,735.5/sq mi (670.08/km^{2})
- Time zone: UTC-6 (CST)
  - Summer (DST): UTC-5 (CDT)
- ZIP code: 62531
- Area code: 217
- GNIS ID: 2398786
- FIPS code: 17-22645

Edinburg is a village in Christian County, Illinois, United States. The population was 1,085 at the 2020 census.

== Geography ==
According to the 2021 census gazetteer files, Edinburg has a total area of 0.63 square miles (1.63 km^{2}), all land.

== Demographics ==
Historical population
Census	Pop.	Note	%±
1880	551		—
1890	806		46.3%
1900	1,071		32.9%
1910	918		−14.3%
1920	823		−10.3%
1930	799		−2.9%
1940	919		15.0%
1950	921		0.2%
1960	1,003		8.9%
1970	1,153		15.0%
1980	1,231		6.8%
1990	982		−20.2%
2000	1,135		15.6%
2010	1,078		−5.0%
2020	1,085		0.6%
U.S. Decennial Census

=== 2020 census ===
As of the 2020 census, Edinburg had a population of 1,085 and 293 families residing in the village. The population density was 1,736.00 inhabitants per square mile (670.27/km^{2}). The median age was 39.3 years. 25.3% of residents were under the age of 18 and 18.2% of residents were 65 years of age or older. For every 100 females there were 94.4 males, and for every 100 females age 18 and over there were 90.8 males age 18 and over.

0.0% of residents lived in urban areas, while 100.0% lived in rural areas.

There were 467 households in Edinburg, of which 30.2% had children under the age of 18 living in them. Of all households, 42.4% were married-couple households, 19.3% were households with a male householder and no spouse or partner present, and 29.3% were households with a female householder and no spouse or partner present. About 32.1% of all households were made up of individuals and 15.0% had someone living alone who was 65 years of age or older.

There were 509 housing units at an average density of 814.40 per square mile (314.44/km^{2}), of which 8.3% were vacant. The homeowner vacancy rate was 0.0% and the rental vacancy rate was 10.1%.

Racial composition as of the 2020 census
Race	Number	Percent
White	1,021	94.1%
Black or African American	2	0.2%
American Indian and Alaska Native	5	0.5%
Asian	0	0.0%
Native Hawaiian and Other Pacific Islander	0	0.0%
Some other race	18	1.7%
Two or more races	39	3.6%
Hispanic or Latino (of any race)	18	1.7%

=== Income and poverty ===
The median income for a household in the village was $61,042, and the median income for a family was $87,589. Males had a median income of $42,167 versus $29,896 for females. The per capita income for the village was $29,631. About 13.0% of families and 11.2% of the population were below the poverty line, including 15.1% of those under age 18 and 20.2% of those age 65 or over.

== Labor Day Festivities ==
Since 1945 Edinburg boasts an annual Labor Day Picnic and Parade which emphasizes the rural and agricultural history of the area. Activities including demolition derbies, tractor pulls, chili cook-offs, live music, games, rides, tournaments and a Labor Day Parade.

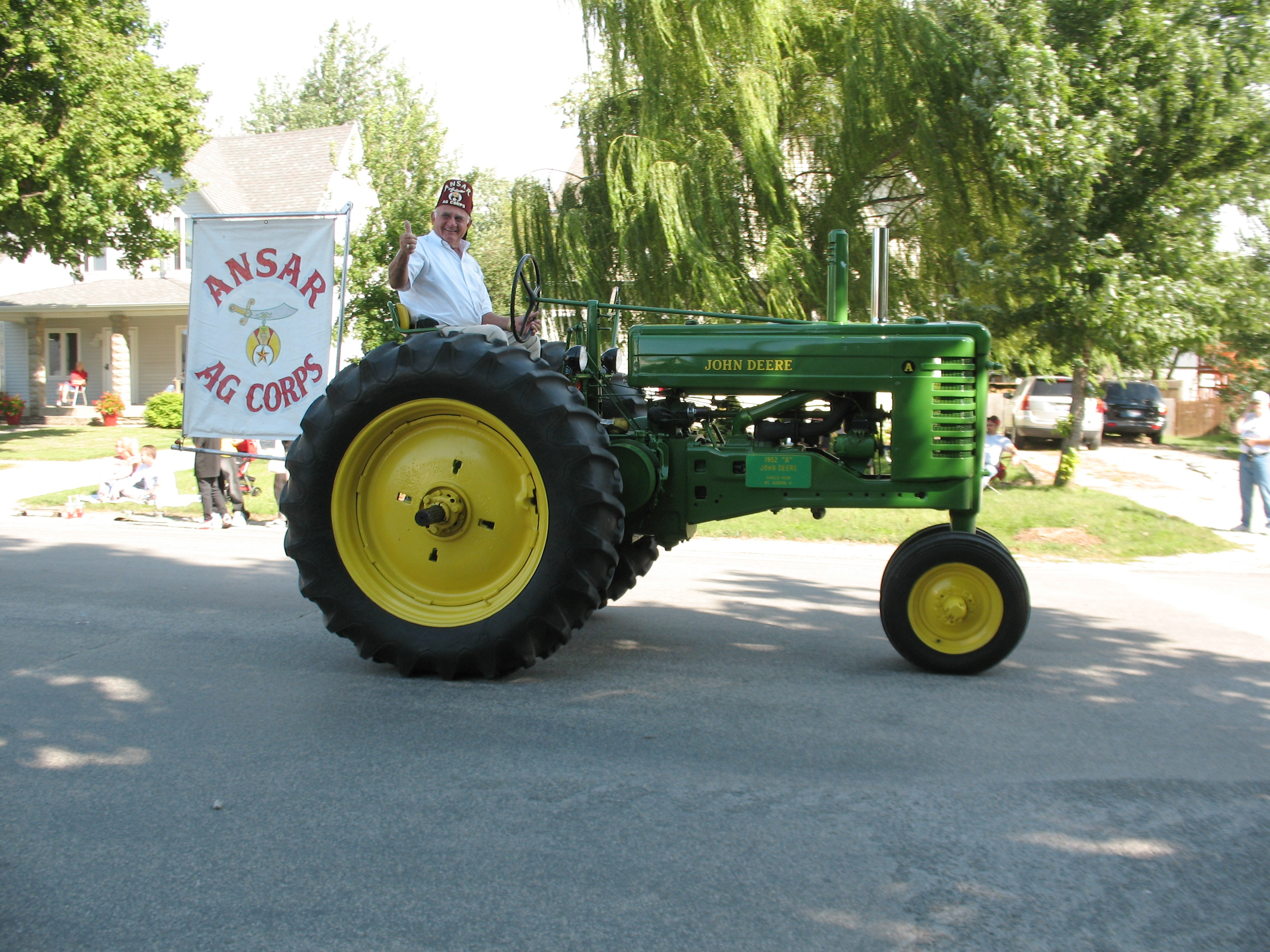
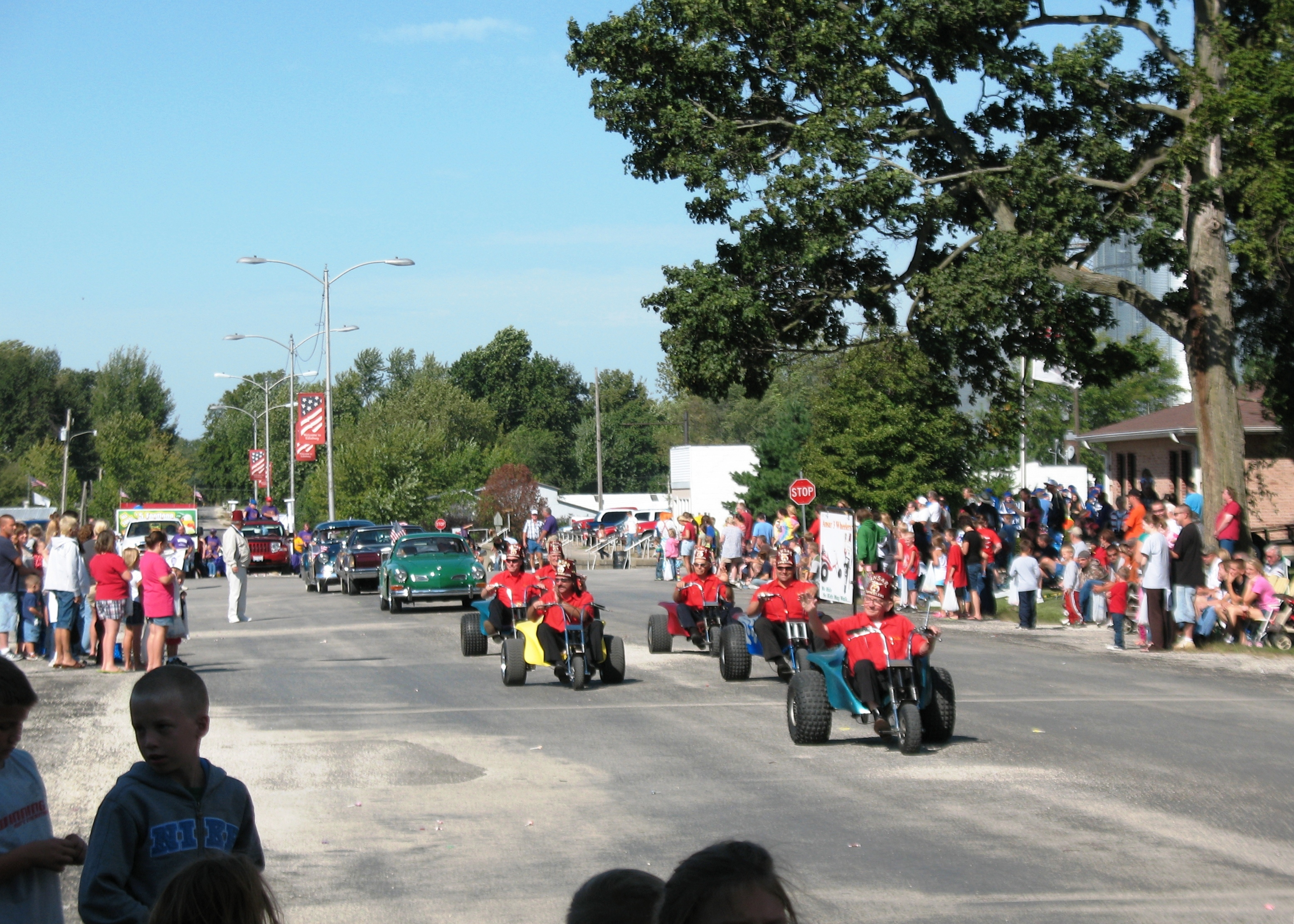
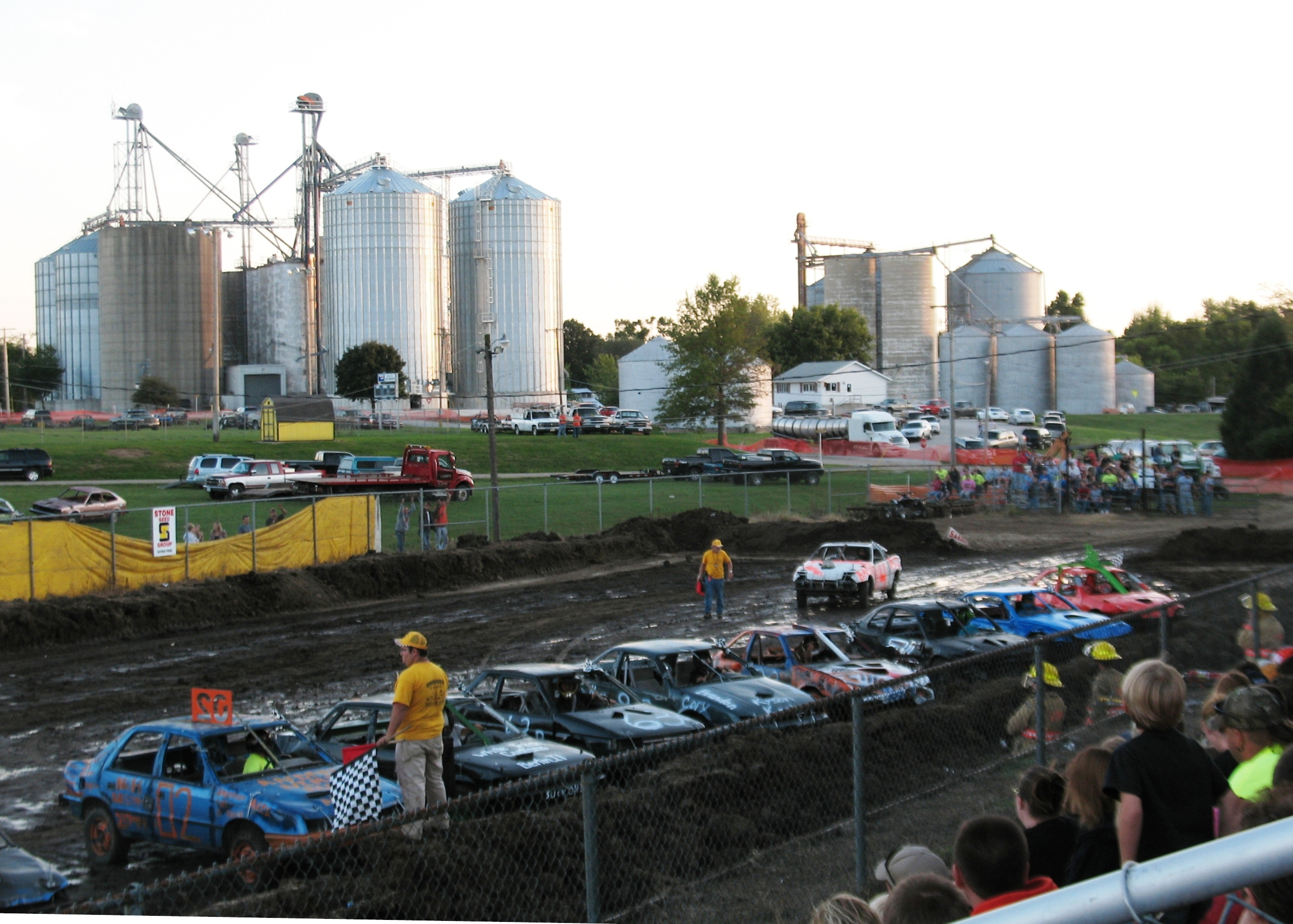
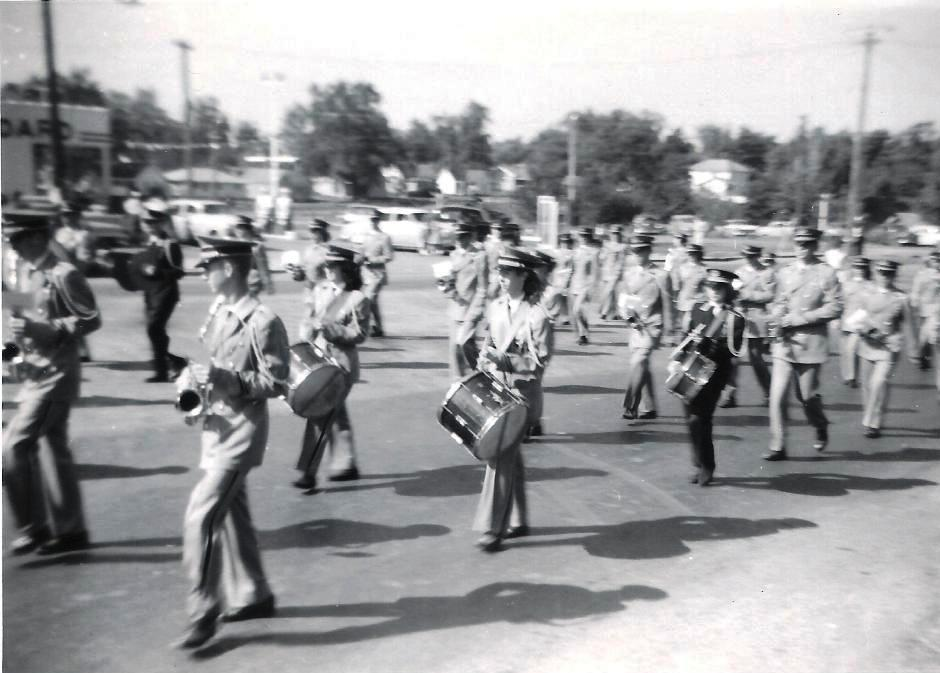
Edinburg Illinois Labor Day Picnic & Parade
