= Pana Township, Christian County, Illinois =

Pana Township
- Township
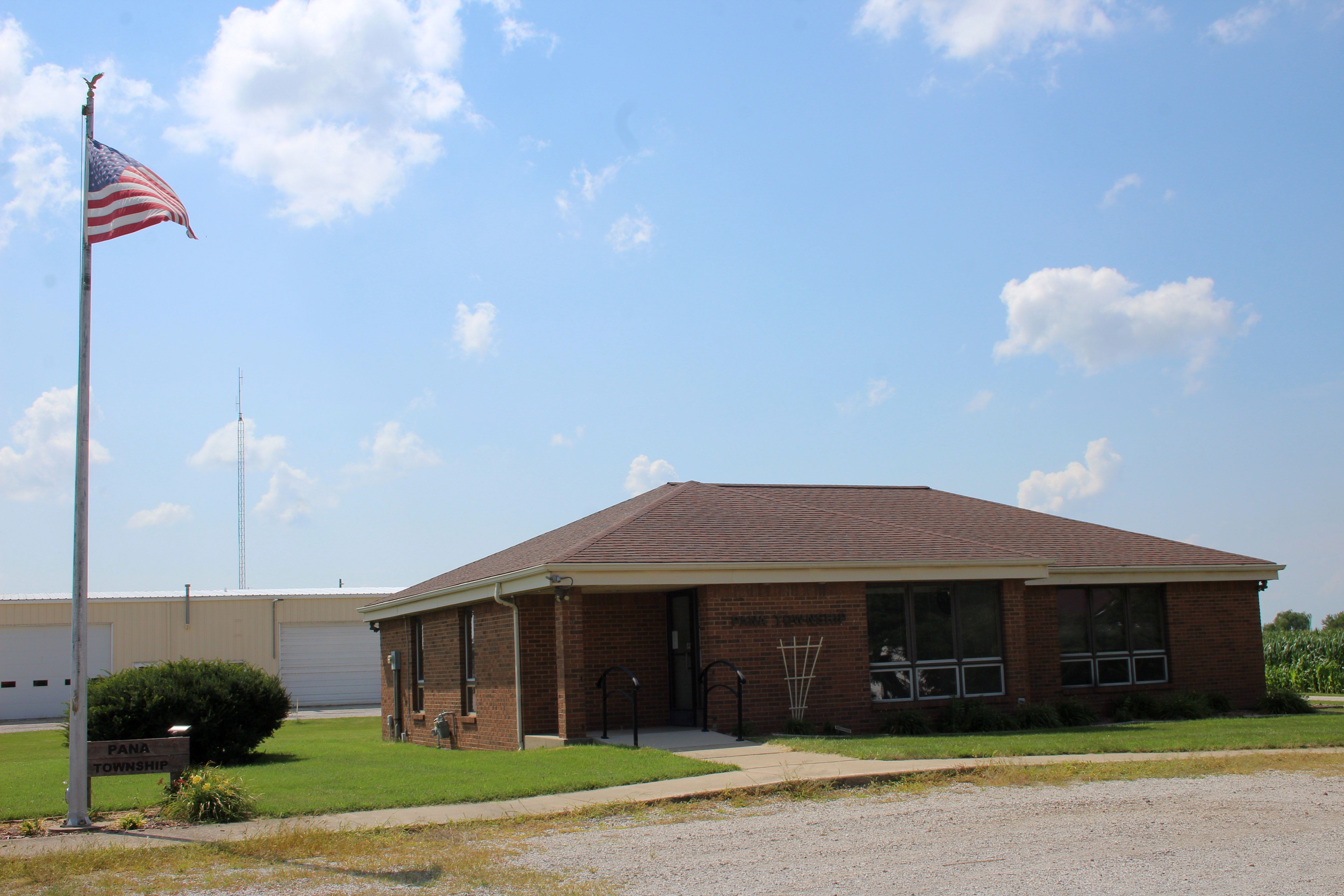
- Township building in Pana

- Location in Christian County

- Christian County's location in Illinois
- Coordinates: 39°24′N 89°5′W
- Country: United States
- State: Illinois
- County: Christian
- Established: November 7, 1865

Area
  - Total: 49.25 sq mi (127.6 km^{2})
  - Land: 49.03 sq mi (127.0 km^{2})
  - Water: 0.22 sq mi (0.57 km^{2}) 0.45%
- Elevation: 673 ft (205 m)

Population (2020)
  - Total: 6,031
  - Density: 123.0/sq mi (47.49/km^{2})
- Time zone: UTC-6 (CST)
  - Summer (DST): UTC-5 (CDT)
- ZIP codes: 62557
- FIPS code: 17-021-57485

Pana Township is one of seventeen townships in Christian County, Illinois, United States. As of the 2020 census, its population was 6,031 and it contained 3,002 housing units.

== Geography ==
According to the 2010 census, the township has a total area of 49.25 square miles (127.6 km^{2}), of which 49.03 square miles (127.0 km^{2}) (or 99.55%) is land and 0.22 square miles (0.57 km^{2}) (or 0.45%) is water.

=== Cities, towns, villages ===
- Pana

=== Cemeteries ===
The township contains these four cemeteries: Calvary, Linwood, Mound and Twin Pines.

=== Major highways ===
- U.S. Route 51
- Illinois Route 16
- Illinois Route 29

=== Airports and landing strips ===
- Tex Landing Strip

=== Lakes ===
- Lake Pana (east of Pana)
- Paragon Lake (southwestern corner of Pana)

== Demographics ==
Historical population
Census	Pop.	Note	%±
1870	3,096		—
1880	4,233		36.7%
1890	6,143		45.1%
1900	6,561		6.8%
1910	7,297		11.2%
1920	7,339		0.6%
1930	7,197		−1.9%
1940	7,423		3.1%
1950	7,536		1.5%
1960	7,803		3.5%
1970	7,350		−5.8%
1980	7,019		−4.5%
1990	7,081		0.9%
2000	6,860		−3.1%
2010	6,647		−3.1%
2020	6,031		−9.3%
U.S. Decennial Census

As of the 2020 census there were 6,031 people, 2,814 households, and 1,636 families residing in the township. The population density was 122.45 inhabitants per square mile (47.28/km^{2}). There were 3,002 housing units at an average density of 60.95 per square mile (23.53/km^{2}). The racial makeup of the township was 95.47% White, 0.35% African American, 0.12% Native American, 0.55% Asian, 0.00% Pacific Islander, 0.35% from other races, and 3.17% from two or more races. Hispanic or Latino of any race were 0.96% of the population.

There were 2,814 households, out of which 28.20% had children under the age of 18 living with them, 39.73% were married couples living together, 12.90% had a female householder with no spouse present, and 41.86% were non-families. 35.60% of all households were made up of individuals, and 19.20% had someone living alone who was 65 years of age or older. The average household size was 2.16 and the average family size was 2.73.

The township's age distribution consisted of 22.3% under the age of 18, 9.2% from 18 to 24, 18.3% from 25 to 44, 26.3% from 45 to 64, and 23.8% who were 65 years of age or older. The median age was 45.5 years. For every 100 females, there were 87.9 males. For every 100 females age 18 and over, there were 89.0 males.

The median income for a household in the township was $43,529, and the median income for a family was $52,717. Males had a median income of $47,927 versus $24,496 for females. The per capita income for the township was $25,520. About 10.8% of families and 13.5% of the population were below the poverty line, including 19.6% of those under age 18 and 7.7% of those age 65 or over.

== School districts ==
- Central A & M Community Unit School District 21
- Pana Community Unit School District 8

== Political districts ==
- State House District 98
- State Senate District 49
