= Vanderville, Illinois =

- Unincorporated community
- Location within Illinois Location within the United States
- Coordinates: 39°25′31″N 89°17′51″W
- Country: United States
- State: Illinois
- County: Christian
- Elevation: 630 ft (190 m)
- Time zone: UTC-6 (Central (CST))
  - Summer (DST): UTC-5 (CDT)
- Area code: 217
- GNIS feature ID: 423274

Vanderville is an unincorporated community in Christian County, Illinois, United States. It lies at 39°25′31″N 89°17′51″W.
