= Owaneco, Illinois =

Owaneco
- Village
- Location of Owaneco in Christian County, Illinois.
- Coordinates: 39°28′53″N 89°11′42″W
- Country: United States
- State: Illinois
- County: Christian

Area
  - Total: 0.46 sq mi (1.19 km^{2})
  - Land: 0.46 sq mi (1.19 km^{2})
  - Water: 0 sq mi (0.00 km^{2})
- Elevation: 620 ft (190 m)

Population (2020)
  - Total: 209
  - Density: 456.0/sq mi (176.08/km^{2})
- Time zone: UTC-6 (CST)
  - Summer (DST): UTC-5 (CDT)
- ZIP code: 62555
- Area code: 217
- FIPS code: 17-57043
- GNIS ID: 2399602

Owaneco is a village in Christian County, Illinois, United States. The population was 209 at the 2020 census.

== Geography ==
According to the 2021 census gazetteer files, Owaneco has a total area of 0.46 square miles (1.19 km^{2}), all land.

== Demographics ==
Historical population
Census	Pop.	Note	%±
1880	140		—
1900	255		—
1910	365		43.1%
1920	334		−8.5%
1930	334		0.0%
1940	366		9.6%
1950	343		−6.3%
1960	290		−15.5%
1970	278		−4.1%
1980	285		2.5%
1990	260		−8.8%
2000	256		−1.5%
2010	239		−6.6%
2020	209		−12.6%
U.S. Decennial Census

As of the 2020 census there were 209 people, 87 households, and 65 families residing in the village. The population density was 456.33 inhabitants per square mile (176.19/km^{2}). There were 93 housing units at an average density of 203.06 per square mile (78.40/km^{2}). The racial makeup of the village was 96.65% White, 0.96% African American, and 2.39% from two or more races. No residents reported an ethnicity of Hispanic or Latino.

There were 87 households, out of which 33.3% had children under the age of 18 living with them, 60.92% were married couples living together, 10.34% had a female householder with no husband present, and 25.29% were non-families. 18.39% of all households were made up of individuals, and 5.75% had someone living alone who was 65 years of age or older. The average household size was 3.31 and the average family size was 2.98.

The village's age distribution consisted of 17.0% under the age of 18, 15.1% from 18 to 24, 30.9% from 25 to 44, 22.4% from 45 to 64, and 14.7% who were 65 years of age or older. The median age was 36.3 years. For every 100 females, there were 83.7 males. For every 100 females age 18 and over, there were 97.2 males.

The median income for a household in the village was $64,063, and the median income for a family was $68,125. Males had a median income of $41,731 versus $24,792 for females. The per capita income for the village was $25,636. No of families and 8.5% of the population were below the poverty line, including none of those under age 18 and 5.3% of those age 65 or over.
