= Bulpitt, Illinois =

Bulpitt
- Village
- Location of Bulpitt in Christian County, Illinois.
- Coordinates: 39°35′31″N 89°25′33″W
- Country: United States
- State: Illinois
- County: Christian

Government
  - Village president: Ruth Wicks

Area
  - Total: 0.069 sq mi (0.18 km^{2})
  - Land: 0.069 sq mi (0.18 km^{2})
  - Water: 0 sq mi (0.00 km^{2})
- Elevation: 600 ft (180 m)

Population (2020)
  - Total: 212
  - Density: 3,083.4/sq mi (1,190.52/km^{2})
- Time zone: UTC-6 (CST)
  - Summer (DST): UTC-5 (CDT)
- Postal code: 62517
- Area code: 217
- FIPS code: 17-09538
- GNIS ID: 2397493

Bulpitt is a village in Christian County, Illinois, United States. The population was 212 at the 2020 census.

== Geography ==
According to the 2021 census gazetteer files, Bulpitt has a total area of 0.07 square miles (0.18 km^{2}), all land.

== Demographics ==
Historical population
Census	Pop.	Note	%±
1920	470		—
1930	447		−4.9%
1940	390		−12.8%
1950	376		−3.6%
1960	307		−18.4%
1970	275		−10.4%
1980	301		9.5%
1990	206		−31.6%
2000	206		0.0%
2010	222		7.8%
2020	212		−4.5%
U.S. Decennial Census

As of the 2020 census there were 212 people, 77 households, and 60 families residing in the village. The population density was 3,072.46 inhabitants per square mile (1,186.28/km^{2}). There were 99 housing units at an average density of 1,434.78 per square mile (553.97/km^{2}). The racial makeup of the village was 92.45% White, 0.94% from other races, and 6.60% from two or more races. Hispanic or Latino of any race were 2.36% of the population.

There were 77 households, out of which 39.0% had children under the age of 18 living with them, 44.16% were married couples living together, 29.87% had a female householder with no husband present, and 22.08% were non-families. 14.29% of all households were made up of individuals, and 10.39% had someone living alone who was 65 years of age or older. The average household size was 3.27 and the average family size was 3.06.

The village's age distribution consisted of 22.0% under the age of 18, 19.5% from 18 to 24, 25.9% from 25 to 44, 22.4% from 45 to 64, and 10.2% who were 65 years of age or older. The median age was 28.0 years. For every 100 females, there were 95.0 males. For every 100 females age 18 and over, there were 76.9 males.

The median income for a household in the village was $59,250, and the median income for a family was $59,500. Males had a median income of $49,000 versus $35,446 for females. The per capita income for the village was $23,528. About 8.3% of families and 10.2% of the population were below the poverty line, including 11.5% of those under age 18 and 25.0% of those age 65 or over.
