= Willey Station, Illinois =

- Unincorporated community
- Location within Illinois Location within the United States
- Coordinates: 39°35′49″N 89°14′00″W
- Country: United States
- State: Illinois
- County: Christian
- Elevation: 633 ft (193 m)
- Time zone: UTC-6 (Central (CST))
  - Summer (DST): UTC-5 (CDT)
- Area code: 217
- GNIS feature ID: 423311

Willey Station (also known as Willeys) is an unincorporated community in Christian County, Illinois, United States.

== History ==
Israel Willey laid out the land and the community was named after him.

== Notable person ==
- Jon Corzine, financier and politician, New Jersey Governor, grew up on a farm near Willey Station.
