= Rosamond Township, Christian County, Illinois =

Rosamond Township
- Township
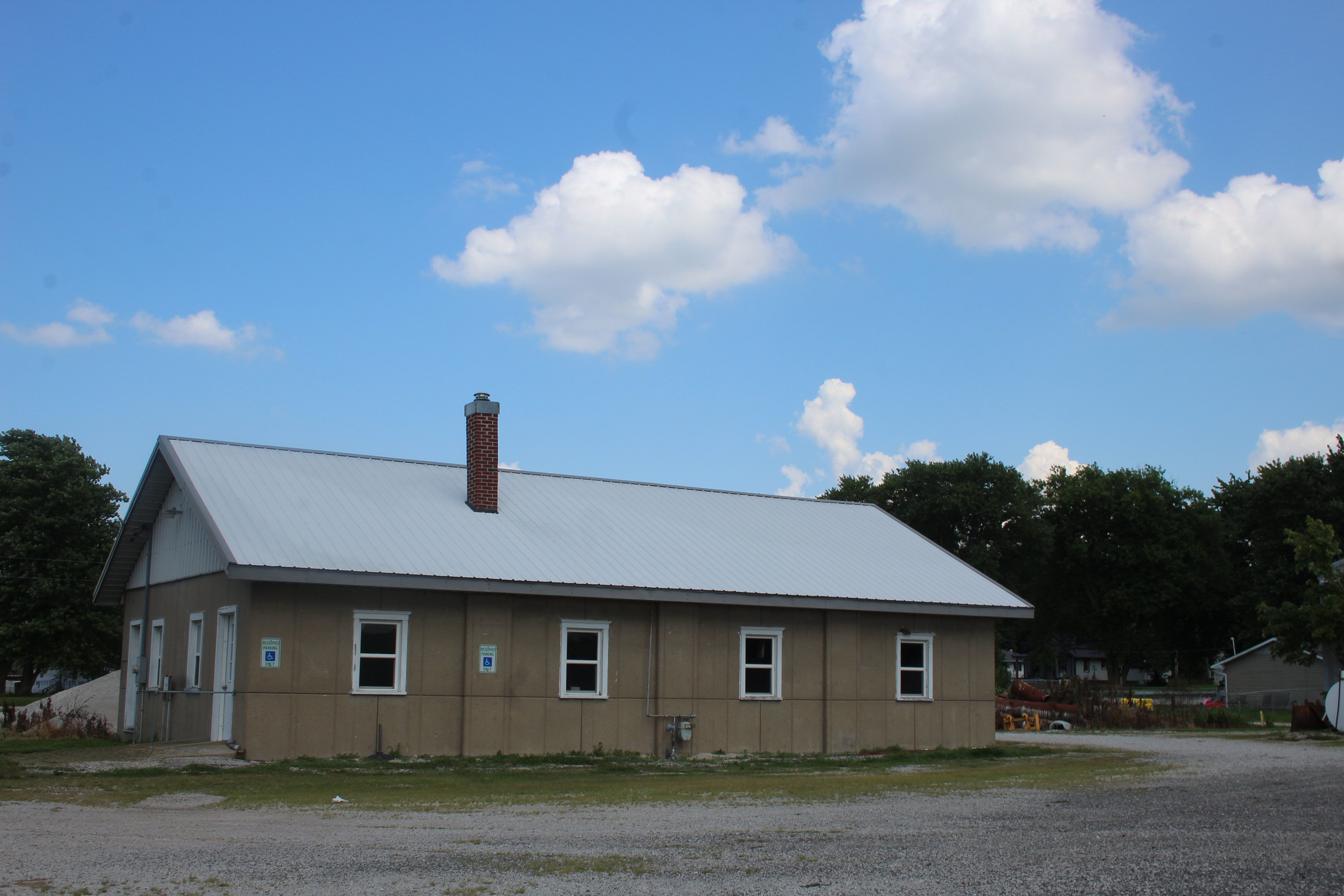
- Township building in Rosamond

- Location in Christian County

- Christian County's location in Illinois
- Coordinates: 39°23′N 89°11′W
- Country: United States
- State: Illinois
- County: Christian
- Established: November 7, 1865

Area
  - Total: 36.03 sq mi (93.3 km^{2})
  - Land: 36.03 sq mi (93.3 km^{2})
  - Water: 0 sq mi (0 km^{2}) 0%
- Elevation: 690 ft (210 m)

Population (2020)
  - Total: 345
  - Density: 9.58/sq mi (3.70/km^{2})
- Time zone: UTC-6 (CST)
  - Summer (DST): UTC-5 (CDT)
- ZIP codes: 62083, 62555, 62557
- FIPS code: 17-021-65598

Rosamond Township is one of seventeen townships in Christian County, Illinois, USA. As of the 2020 census, its population was 345 and it contained 162 housing units.

== Geography ==
According to the 2010 census, the township has a total area of 36.03 square miles (93.3 km^{2}), all land.

=== Unincorporated towns ===
- Rosamond at 39.380°N 89.162°W

=== Cemeteries ===
The township contains these three cemeteries: Ohlman, Potters Field and Rosamond Grove.

=== Major highways ===
- Illinois Route 16

== Demographics ==
Historical population
Census	Pop.	Note	%±
1870	1,107		—
1880	1,274		15.1%
1890	1,180		−7.4%
1900	1,069		−9.4%
1910	1,058		−1.0%
1920	938		−11.3%
1930	849		−9.5%
1940	676		−20.4%
1950	696		3.0%
1960	638		−8.3%
1970	566		−11.3%
1980	469		−17.1%
1990	443		−5.5%
2000	400		−9.7%
2010	421		5.3%
2020	345		−18.1%
U.S. Decennial Census

As of the 2020 census there were 345 people, 127 households, and 50 families residing in the township. The population density was 9.57 inhabitants per square mile (3.69/km^{2}). There were 157 housing units at an average density of 4.36 per square mile (1.68/km^{2}). The racial makeup of the township was 96.23% White, 0.00% African American, 0.00% Native American, 0.29% Asian, 0.00% Pacific Islander, 0.58% from other races, and 2.90% from two or more races. Hispanic or Latino of any race were 0.58% of the population.

There were 127 households, out of which 11.00% had children under the age of 18 living with them, 25.98% were married couples living together, 13.39% had a female householder with no spouse present, and 60.63% were non-families. 60.60% of all households were made up of individuals, and none had someone living alone who was 65 years of age or older. The average household size was 1.83 and the average family size was 3.12.

The township's age distribution consisted of 10.7% under the age of 18, 8.2% from 18 to 24, 15% from 25 to 44, 56.6% from 45 to 64, and 9.4% who were 65 years of age or older. The median age was 56.3 years. For every 100 females, there were 156.0 males. For every 100 females age 18 and over, there were 128.6 males.

The median income for a family in the township was $86,667. Males had a median income of $14,762 versus $40,469 for females. The per capita income for the township was $27,500. No families and 3.0% of the population were below the poverty line.

== School districts ==
- Pana Community Unit School District 8
- Nokomis Community Unit School District 22

== Political districts ==
- State House District 98
- State Senate District 49
