= Tovey, Illinois =

Tovey
- Village
- Location of Tovey in Christian County, Illinois.
- Coordinates: 39°35′18″N 89°26′55″W
- Country: United States
- State: Illinois
- County: Christian

Government
  - Village president: Mike Masterson

Area
  - Total: 0.22 sq mi (0.58 km^{2})
  - Land: 0.22 sq mi (0.58 km^{2})
  - Water: 0 sq mi (0.00 km^{2})
- Elevation: 600 ft (180 m)

Population (2020)
  - Total: 464
  - Density: 2,081.2/sq mi (803.55/km^{2})
- Time zone: UTC-6 (CST)
  - Summer (DST): UTC-5 (CDT)
- ZIP code: 62570
- Area code: 217
- FIPS code: 17-75809
- GNIS ID: 2399996

Tovey is a village in Christian County, Illinois, United States. The town's population was 464 at the 2020 census.

== Geography ==
According to the 2021 census gazetteer files, Tovey has a total area of 0.22 square miles (0.57 km^{2}), all land.

== Demographics ==
Historical population
| Census | Pop. | Note | %± |
|---|---|---|---|
| 1920 | 913 | | — |
| 1930 | 933 | | 2.2% |
| 1940 | 803 | | −13.9% |
| 1950 | 593 | | −26.2% |
| 1960 | 646 | | 8.9% |
| 1970 | 620 | | −4.0% |
| 1980 | 598 | | −3.5% |
| 1990 | 533 | | −10.9% |
| 2000 | 516 | | −3.2% |
| 2010 | 512 | | −0.8% |
| 2020 | 464 | | −9.4% |
U.S. Decennial Census

As of the 2020 census there were 464 people, 239 households, and 128 families residing in the village. The population density was 2,080.72 inhabitants per square mile (803.37/km^{2}). There were 222 housing units at an average density of 995.52 per square mile (384.37/km^{2}). The racial makeup of the village was 95.47% White, 0.43% African American, 0.22% Native American, 0.65% Asian, and 3.23% from two or more races. Hispanic or Latino of any race were 1.51% of the population.

There were 239 households, out of which 32.6% had children under the age of 18 living with them, 43.93% were married couples living together, 4.60% had a female householder with no husband present, and 46.44% were non-families. 19.67% of all households were made up of individuals, and 8.79% had someone living alone who was 65 years of age or older. The average household size was 3.18 and the average family size was 2.44.

The village's age distribution consisted of 20.6% under the age of 18, 12.4% from 18 to 24, 28.5% from 25 to 44, 27.8% from 45 to 64, and 10.8% who were 65 years of age or older. The median age was 39.6 years. For every 100 females, there were 116.4 males. For every 100 females age 18 and over, there were 114.9 males.

The median income for a household in the village was $90,246, and the median income for a family was $71,250. Males had a median income of $61,205 versus $30,870 for females. The per capita income for the village was $35,699. About 3.1% of families and 5.7% of the population were below the poverty line, including 1.7% of those under age 18 and 3.2% of those age 65 or over.
