= Sicily, Illinois =

- Unincorporated community
- Location within Illinois Location within the United States
- Coordinates: 39°35′24″N 89°29′28″W
- Country: United States
- State: Illinois
- County: Christian
- Elevation: 600 ft (180 m)
- Time zone: UTC-6 (Central (CST))
  - Summer (DST): UTC-5 (CDT)
- Area code: 217
- GNIS feature ID: 418489

Sicily is an unincorporated community in Christian County, Illinois, United States. It lies at 39°35′24″N 89°29′28″W.
