= Clarksdale, Illinois =

Clarksdale
- Unincorporated community
- Location of Clarksdale within Illinois Clarksdale (the United States)
- Coordinates: 39°29′23″N 89°22′04″W
- Country: United States
- State: Illinois
- County: Christian
- Elevation: 630 ft (190 m)
- Time zone: UTC-6 (CST)
  - Summer (DST): UTC-5 (CDT)
- GNIS ID: 422557

Clarksdale is an unincorporated community in Christian County, Illinois, United States. The community is on Illinois Route 48 approximately 5.5 miles southwest of Taylorville.
