= Langleyville, Illinois =

- Census-designated place
- Location within Illinois
- Coordinates: 39°33′40″N 89°21′37″W
- Country: United States
- State: Illinois
- County: Christian

Area
  - Total: 0.39 sq mi (1.02 km^{2})
  - Land: 0.39 sq mi (1.02 km^{2})
  - Water: 0 sq mi (0.00 km^{2})
- Elevation: 604 ft (184 m)

Population (2020)
  - Total: 391
  - Density: 995.1/sq mi (384.21/km^{2})
- Time zone: UTC-6 (Central (CST))
  - Summer (DST): UTC-5 (CDT)
- Area code: 217
- GNIS feature ID: 2629875
- FIPS code: 17-42002

Langleyville (also Calloway) is an unincorporated census-designated place in Christian County, Illinois, United States. As of the 2020 census, it had a population of 391.

== Geography ==
According to the 2021 census gazetteer files, Langleyville has a total area of 0.39 square miles (1.01 km^{2}), all land.

== Demographics ==
Historical population
Census	Pop.	Note	%±
2010	432		—
2020	391		−9.5%
U.S. Decennial Census

|2020= 391 As of the 2020 census there were 391 people, 191 households, and 147 families residing in the CDP. The population density was 994.91 inhabitants per square mile (384.14/km^{2}). There were 163 housing units at an average density of 414.76 per square mile (160.14/km^{2}). The racial makeup of the CDP was 91.56% White, 0.26% Native American, 0.51% Asian, 0.26% from other races, and 7.42% from two or more races. Hispanic or Latino of any race were 0.51% of the population.

There were 191 households, out of which 29.8% had children under the age of 18 living with them, 56.54% were married couples living together, 20.42% had a female householder with no husband present, and 23.04% were non-families. 23.04% of all households were made up of individuals, and 23.04% had someone living alone who was 65 years of age or older. The average household size was 2.52 and the average family size was 2.30.

The CDP's age distribution consisted of 25.1% under the age of 18, none from 18 to 24, 18.9% from 25 to 44, 20.8% from 45 to 64, and 35.3% who were 65 years of age or older. The median age was 53.5 years. For every 100 females, there were 77.0 males. For every 100 females age 18 and over, there were 58.2 males.

The median income for a household in the CDP was $60,221, and the median income for a family was $62,279. Males had a median income of $70,268 versus $21,094 for females. The per capita income for the CDP was $28,541. None of the population was below the poverty line.
