= Millersville, Illinois =

- Unincorporated community
- Location within Illinois Location within the United States
- Coordinates: 39°27′4″N 89°9′29″W
- Country: United States
- State: Illinois
- County: Christian
- Elevation: 656 ft (200 m)
- Time zone: UTC-6 (Central (CST))
  - Summer (DST): UTC-5 (CDT)
- Area code: 217
- GNIS feature ID: 422981

Millersville is an unincorporated community in Christian County, Illinois, United States. It lies at 39°27′4″N 89°9′29″W, at an elevation of 656 feet.
