= Jeisyville, Illinois =

Jeisyville
- Village
- Location of Jeisyville in Christian County, Illinois.
- Coordinates: 39°34′45″N 89°24′29″W
- Country: United States
- State: Illinois
- County: Christian

Government
  - Village president: Mike Drnjevic

Area
  - Total: 0.12 sq mi (0.31 km^{2})
  - Land: 0.12 sq mi (0.31 km^{2})
  - Water: 0 sq mi (0.00 km^{2})
- Elevation: 604 ft (184 m)

Population (2020)
  - Total: 102
  - Density: 839.5/sq mi (324.13/km^{2})
- Time zone: UTC-6 (CST)
  - Summer (DST): UTC-5 (CDT)
- ZIP code: 62568
- Area code: 217
- FIPS code: 17-38349
- GNIS ID: 2398295

Jeisyville is a small village in Christian County, Illinois, United States. The population was 102 at the 2020 census.

== Geography ==
According to the 2021 census gazetteer files, Jeisyville has a total area of 0.12 square miles (0.31 km^{2}), all land.

== Demographics ==
Historical population
Census	Pop.	Note	%±
1920	428		—
1930	330		−22.9%
1940	216		−34.5%
1950	199		−7.9%
1960	169		−15.1%
1970	182		7.7%
1980	178		−2.2%
1990	126		−29.2%
2000	128		1.6%
2010	107		−16.4%
2020	102		−4.7%
U.S. Decennial Census

As of the 2020 census there were 102 people, 28 households, and 15 families residing in the village. The population density was 836.07 inhabitants per square mile (322.81/km^{2}). There were 47 housing units at an average density of 385.25 per square mile (148.75/km^{2}). The racial makeup of the village was 90.20% White, 0.98% Asian, and 8.82% from two or more races. Hispanic or Latino of any race were 2.94% of the population.

There were 28 households, out of which 14.3% had children under the age of 18 living with them, 46.43% were married couples living together, 0.00% had a female householder with no husband present, and 46.43% were non-families. 32.14% of all households were made up of individuals, and 32.14% had someone living alone who was 65 years of age or older. The average household size was 2.73 and the average family size was 2.07.

The village's age distribution consisted of 20.7% under the age of 18, none from 18 to 24, 15.5% from 25 to 44, 15.5% from 45 to 64, and 48.3% who were 65 years of age or older. The median age was 58.8 years. For every 100 females, there were 123.1 males. For every 100 females age 18 and over, there were 155.6 males.

The median income for a household in the village was $67,500, and the median income for a family was $51,875. Males had a median income of $57,500 versus $45,313 for females. The per capita income for the village was $36,953. None of the population was below the poverty line.
