= Harry Forrester (coach) =

American basketball coach (1922–2008)

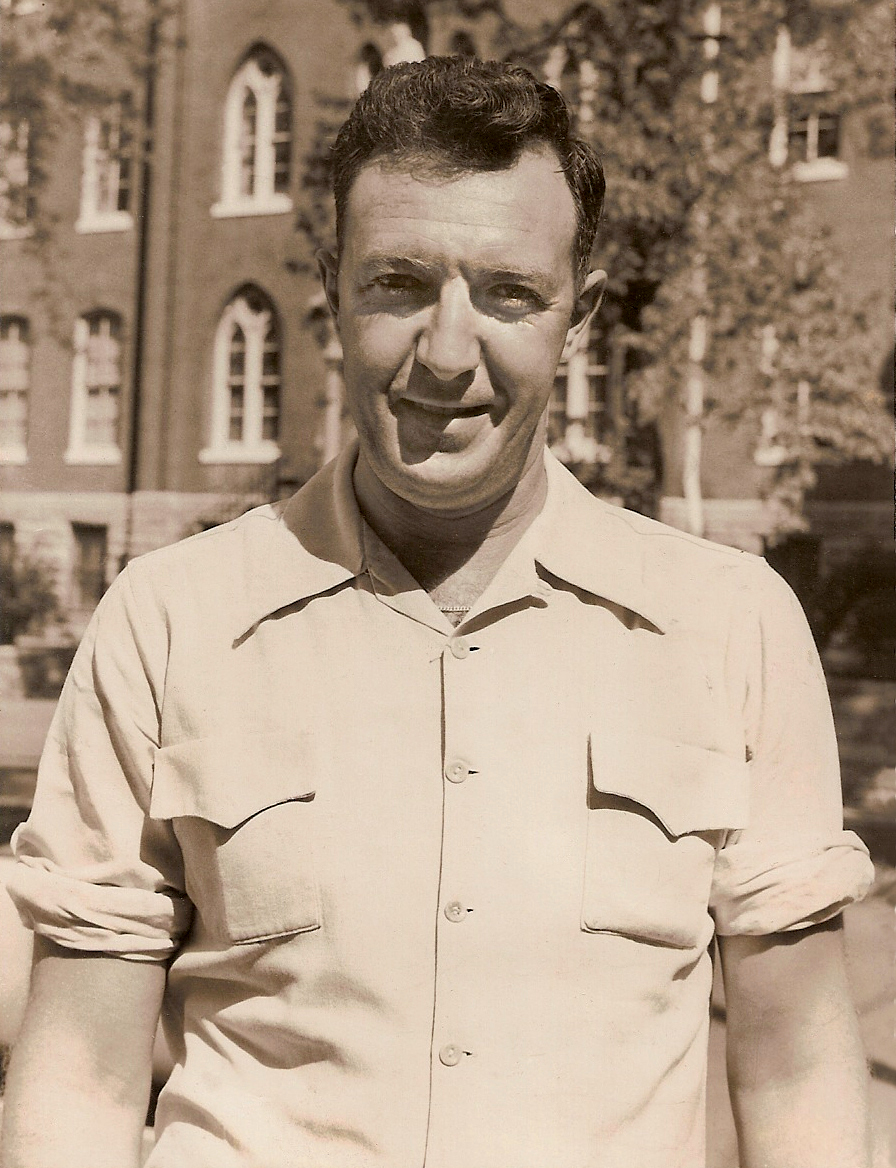
- Forrester at Quincy College, 1954
- Born: Harry Conway Forrester; August 19, 1922; Raymond, Illinois, U.S.
- Died: July 16, 2008 (aged 85); Champaign, Illinois, U.S.
- Education: Millikin University; Eastern Illinois University
- Occupations: Basketball coach, teacher, athletic director

Harry Conway Forrester (August 19, 1922 – July 16, 2008) was an American basketball coach who led the way in integrating the sports teams of Quincy University in the racially segregated 1950s. When Quincy played at the NAIA (now NCAA) national tournament in 1955, it was the only team with African American members.

Forrester was inducted into the Illinois Basketball Coaches Hall of Fame and the Quincy University Hall of Fame. He was the Catholic College Coach of the Year in 1956–57.

== Early life ==
Forrester was born in Raymond, Illinois. His parents were Mary Josephine (née Conway) and Harry Dean Forrester.

During World War II, he was a machinist for the Navy, serving on the USS Kennebago. He attended Millikin University, graduating with a Bachelor's degree in 1949. In 1959 he received a Master's Degree in education from Eastern Illinois University.

== Career ==
In 1949, Forrester began his coaching career at St. Anthony High School in Effingham, Illinois. He was the high school's first full-time basketball coach. He led the team to a 21–7 record in his first year and an overall five-year record of 95–43. The team won the school's first National Trail Conference Championship in 1952–53.

In July 1954, Forrester was hired by Quincy College (now Quincy University) as their head basketball and baseball coach. He also served as the college's athletic director. Forrester did something other colleges refused to do during the segregation era—play black players. He decision to integrate the Quincy basketball team and start black players was a decade ahead of the integrated basketball teams at Loyola University Chicago and Texas Western, which gained greater fame in the 1960s. He often played an all-black line up, including Edsel Bester, Ben Bumbry, "Easy" Ed Crenshaw, Bill Lemon, and Dick Thompson.

To Thompson, Forrester was a visionary: "He had the courage to look a little ahead of the curve. He played guys who had the ability to get the job done. It didn't matter the color of your skin. That's a tribute to him as a person, that he looked far beyond the situation and had the courage to do what he did in playing guys of color." Bester recalled, "He judged each one of us by the content of our character. He let us know we were not only representing ourselves but our parents, our coach and our school, and he didn't want you to forget that. I loved Coach Harry Forrester and I thank God every day in my life that I knew him."

In his first year at Quincy, the basketball team's 17–9 season was the school's best-ever season at the time. They were invited to the quarterfinals of the 1955 NAIA national tournament in Kansas City, becoming the college's first athletic team to qualify for a national competition. Despite their success, the team was subjected to racial taunts and threats when they played on the road. They were also the only team at the NAIA with African American players. A modern sports writer recalls, "After winning its opening-round game in the 32-school tournament, Quincy lost its next start by four points to a team considered far inferior—but white. Quincy's black players were constantly in foul trouble and the Hawks got few, if any, breaks when it came to officials' calls. To this day, if you ask any of those Quincy players, they will tell you they did not lose the second game of that national tournament. The other team simply wound up with more points on the scoreboard."

Quincy replaced Forrester after his third season in 1957. He became a coach and teacher at Tuscola High School but was fired after a 6-36 record. Later, he was a physical education teacher at Champaign Community Unit 4 schools and a principal a Pesotum Grade School. He was also a high school and college basketball referee, receiving recognition from the Illini Basketball Officials Association "for his outstanding achievement in basketball officiating" in 1989.

== Awards and honors ==
- 1956–57: Catholic Coach of the Year
- 1982: Illinois Basketball Coaches Association Hall of Fame
- 1989: Illini Basketball Officials Association outstanding achievement
- 2005: Quincy University's Hall of Fame for sports

== Legacy ==
In 2012, journalist Stever Eighinger noted, "Harry Forrester did not spend much time in Quincy, but it's safe to say his impact will be remembered forever." Eighinger recalls that Forrester's decision to start five black basketball players "came at the height of racial insensitivity in the mid-to-late 1950s and was a full decade before Texas Western (now UTEP) started five black players in what is now the NCAA Division I national championship game. A movie was made about that Texas Western team, but outside of Quincy, only a handful of people to this day realize history was first made in West-Central Illinois." Eighinger observed that Forrester "eventually earned as much respect for his decision to play five black players as he did for leading the Hawks to their first national tournament appearance."

Forrester's life was chronicled in Blaw, Hunter, Blaw Thy Horn: A Memoir, published by his son Gary Forrester in 2011.

== Personal life ==
Forrester married Alma Rose Grundy on August 14, 1945, in Morrisonville Illinois. They were high school sweethearts. The couple had five children, Gary, Nancy, Rita, James, and Rose.

He was a member of the Knight of Columbus, the St. Vincent DePaul Society, and St. Matthew Catholic Church in Champaign. He also was a hospice volunteer at Mercy Hospital. He played in the Champaign Park District's Golden Gloves softball league well into his seventies.

Forrester died in 2008 at the age of 85.
