= National Register of Historic Places listings in Clark County, Illinois =

Location of Clark County in Illinois

This is a list of the National Register of Historic Places listings in Clark County, Illinois.

This is intended to be a complete list of the properties and districts on the National Register of Historic Places in Clark County, Illinois, United States. Latitude and longitude coordinates are provided for many National Register properties and districts; these locations may be seen together in a map.

There are 9 properties and districts listed on the National Register in the county. Another property was once listed but has been removed.

This National Park Service list is complete through NPS recent listings posted March 21, 2025.

== Current listings ==
	Name on the Register	Image	Date listed	Location	City or town	Description
1	Archer House Hotel	Archer House Hotel	March 16, 1976 (#76000685)	717 Archer Ave. 39°23′27″N 87°41′40″W	Marshall	Built in 1841
2	Robert L. Dulaney House	Robert L. Dulaney House	May 2, 1997 (#97000382)	602 N. 7th St. 39°23′43″N 87°41′52″W	Marshall	
3	First Congregational Church	First Congregational Church	February 5, 2003 (#02001753)	202 N. 6th St. 39°23′29″N 87°41′48″W	Marshall	
4	Harlan Hall	Harlan Hall	November 29, 2001 (#01001309)	603 Locust St. 39°23′22″N 87°41′42″W	Marshall	Built in 1872
5	John W. Lewis House	John W. Lewis House	February 26, 1982 (#82002519)	503 Chestnut St. 39°23′13″N 87°41′42″W	Marshall	Built 1906-08
6	Manly-McCann House	Manly-McCann House	March 5, 1982 (#82002520)	402 S. 4th St. 39°23′13″N 87°41′47″W	Marshall	
7	Marshall Business Historic District	Marshall Business Historic District	May 24, 2013 (#13000183)	Archer Ave. and the area between Plum, S. 5th, Locust, and Michigan Aves. 39°23′27″N 87°41′44″W	Marshall	
8	Old Stone Arch Bridge	Old Stone Arch Bridge	November 28, 1978 (#78001117)	East of Clark Center off U.S. Route 40; 39°22′13″N 87°45′29″W	Clark Center	
9	Old Stone Arch, National Road	Old Stone Arch, National Road	February 20, 1975 (#75000643)	Archer St. 39°23′11″N 87°41′47″W	Marshall	

== Former listing ==
	Name on the Register	Image	Date listed	Date removed	Location	City or town	Description
1	Millhouse Blacksmith Shop		May 12, 1987 (#86003156)	April 17, 2003	Main and Poplar Sts.	Clarksville	

== See also ==
- List of National Historic Landmarks in Illinois
- National Register of Historic Places listings in Illinois
