= York Township, Clark County, Illinois =

York Township
- Township
- Location in Clark County

- Clark County's location in Illinois
- Coordinates: 39°13′15″N 87°38′13″W
- Country: United States
- State: Illinois
- County: Clark
- Established: November 7, 1854

Area
  - Total: 31.83 sq mi (82.4 km^{2})
  - Land: 31.27 sq mi (81.0 km^{2})
  - Water: 0.56 sq mi (1.5 km^{2}) 1.76%
- Elevation: 449 ft (137 m)

Population (2020)
  - Total: 509
  - Density: 16.3/sq mi (6.28/km^{2})
- Time zone: UTC-6 (CST)
  - Summer (DST): UTC-5 (CDT)
- ZIP codes: 62477
- FIPS code: 17-023-83934
- GNIS feature ID: 0429969

York Township is one of fifteen townships in Clark County, Illinois, USA. As of the 2020 census, its population was 509 and it contained 237 housing units.

== Geography ==
According to the 2010 census, the township has a total area of 31.83 square miles (82.4 km^{2}), of which 31.27 square miles (81.0 km^{2}) (or 98.24%) is land and 0.56 square miles (1.5 km^{2}) (or 1.76%) is water.

=== Unincorporated towns ===
- Walnut Prairie
- West Union
- York

(This list is based on USGS data and may include former settlements.)

=== Cemeteries ===
The township contains these five cemeteries: Harrison, Hogue, Shawler, Walnut Prairie and York.

=== Major highways ===
- Illinois Route 1

=== Rivers ===
- Wabash River

=== Landmarks ===
- West Union Park

== Demographics ==
Historical population
Census	Pop.	Note	%±
2010	551		—
2020	509		−7.6%
U.S. Decennial Census

As of the 2020 census there were 509 people, 133 households, and 113 families residing in the township. The population density was 15.99 inhabitants per square mile (6.17/km^{2}). There were 237 housing units at an average density of 7.45 per square mile (2.88/km^{2}). The racial makeup of the township was 97.05% White, 0.00% African American, 0.00% Native American, 0.20% Asian, 0.00% Pacific Islander, 1.18% from other races, and 1.57% from two or more races. Hispanic or Latino of any race were 0.20% of the population.

There were 133 households, out of which 30.10% had children under the age of 18 living with them, 72.93% were married couples living together, none had a female householder with no spouse present, and 15.04% were non-families. 15.00% of all households were made up of individuals, and none had someone living alone who was 65 years of age or older. The average household size was 2.80 and the average family size was 2.82.

The township's age distribution consisted of 22.6% under the age of 18, 9.7% from 18 to 24, 29.2% from 25 to 44, 17.4% from 45 to 64, and 21.0% who were 65 years of age or older. The median age was 41.4 years. For every 100 females, there were 98.9 males. For every 100 females age 18 and over, there were 119.8 males.

The median income for a household in the township was $57,031, and the median income for a family was $65,486. Males had a median income of $42,083 versus $3,750 for females. The per capita income for the township was $19,374. About 12.4% of families and 15.4% of the population were below the poverty line, including 8.6% of those under age 18 and 12.8% of those age 65 or over.

== School districts ==
- Hutsonville Community Unit School District 1
- Marshall Community Unit School District 2c

== Political districts ==
- Illinois' 15th congressional district
- State House District 109
- State Senate District 55
