= Auburn Township, Illinois =

Auburn Township, Illinois refers to one of the following places:

- Auburn Township, Clark County, Illinois
- Auburn Township, Sangamon County, Illinois

There is also:

- Mount Auburn Township, Christian County, Illinois

See also

- Auburn Township (disambiguation)
