= Parker Township =

Parker Township may refer to:

- Parker Township, Nevada County, Arkansas, in Nevada County, Arkansas
- Parker Township, Clark County, Illinois
- Parker Township, Montgomery County, Kansas, in Montgomery County, Kansas
- Parker Township, Marshall County, Minnesota
- Parker Township, Morrison County, Minnesota
- Parker Township, Pennsylvania
- Parker Township, Turner County, South Dakota, in Turner County, South Dakota
