= Cleone, Illinois =

- Unincorporated community
- Location within Illinois Location within the United States
- Coordinates: 39°25′23″N 87°54′27″W
- Country: United States
- State: Illinois
- County: Clark
- Elevation: 650 ft (200 m)
- Time zone: UTC-6 (Central (CST))
  - Summer (DST): UTC-5 (CDT)
- Area code: 217
- GNIS feature ID: 422562

Cleone is an unincorporated rural community in Parker Township, Clark County, Illinois, United States. Cleone is 7 miles (11 km) north of Martinsville.

Around 1900, Cleone was a rural community with a grocery store, farm supply store, and post office. It had a post office from 1886 through 1906. By around 1950, all that remained were a few houses and general store, which eventually all yielded to a lone cemetery. The community was also known early on as "Hammond Settlement" or "Hammond Center", since many of that surname lived in the area.

One 1950 publication calls Cleone "a small community in Clark County, near Martinsville, where ... baseball was the grand passion."
