= Martinsville Township, Clark County, Illinois =

Martinsville Township
- Township
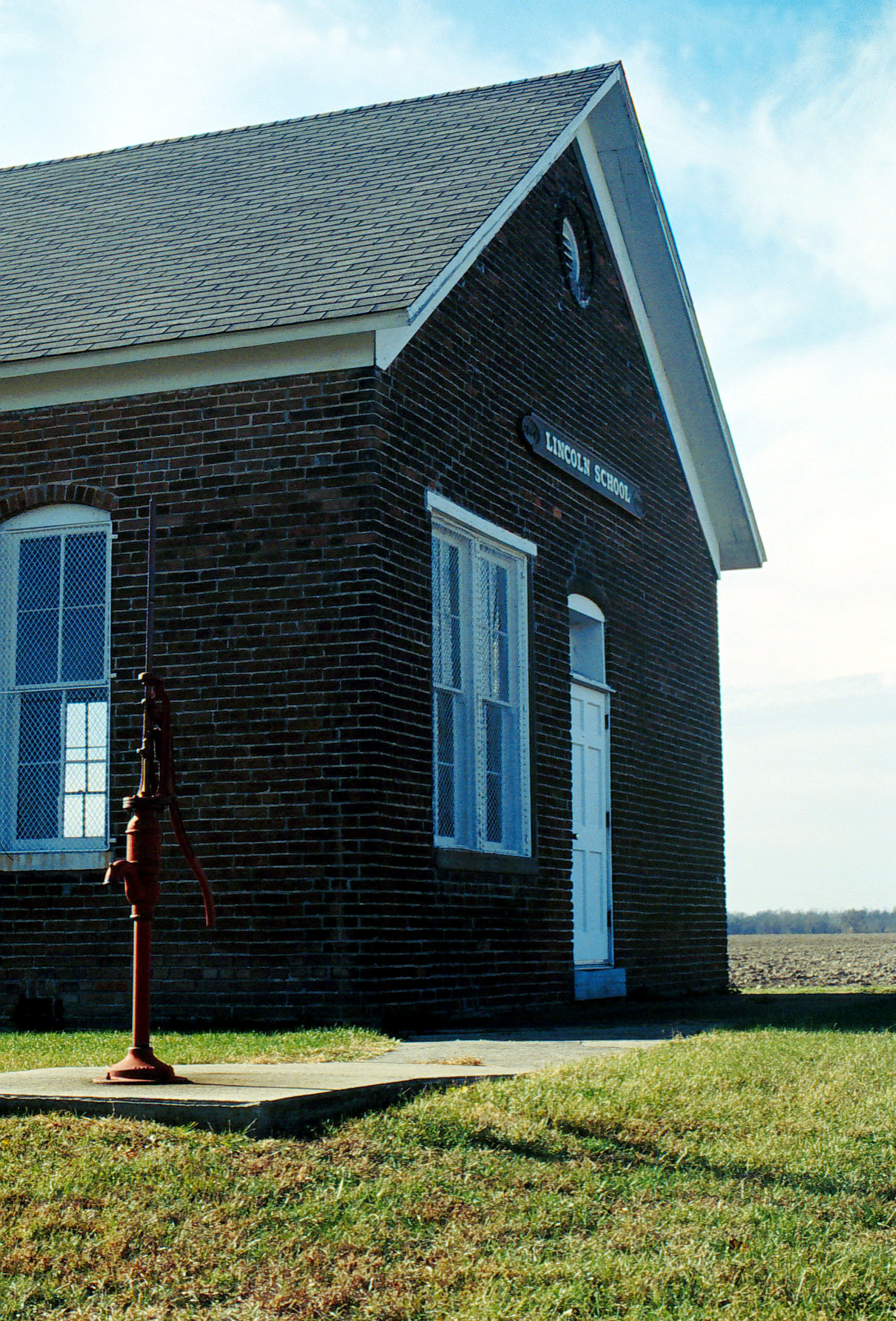
- The Lincoln School Museum, north of Martinsville: Once a one-room schoolhouse, it is now a museum showcasing primary education of the late 19th century.

- Location in Clark County

- Clark County's location in Illinois
- Coordinates: 39°19′21″N 87°51′22″W
- Country: United States
- State: Illinois
- County: Clark
- Established: November 7, 1854

Area
  - Total: 41.82 sq mi (108.3 km^{2})
  - Land: 41.67 sq mi (107.9 km^{2})
  - Water: 0.15 sq mi (0.39 km^{2}) 0.36%
- Elevation: 643 ft (196 m)

Population (2020)
  - Total: 1,542
  - Density: 37.01/sq mi (14.29/km^{2})
- Time zone: UTC-6 (CST)
  - Summer (DST): UTC-5 (CDT)
- ZIP code: 62442
- FIPS code: 17-023-47267

Martinsville Township is one of fifteen townships in Clark County, Illinois, USA. As of the 2020 census, its population was 1,542 and it contained 727 housing units.

== Geography ==
According to the 2010 census, the township has a total area of 41.82 square miles (108.3 km^{2}), of which 41.67 square miles (107.9 km^{2}) (or 99.64%) is land and 0.15 square miles (0.39 km^{2}) (or 0.36%) is water.

=== Cities, towns, villages ===
- Martinsville

=== Unincorporated towns ===
(This list is based on USGS data and may include former settlements.)

=== Cemeteries ===
The township contains these six cemeteries: Island Grove, Kettering, Lincoln, Mount Pleasant, Baird and Rupp.

=== Major highways ===
- Interstate 70
- U.S. Route 40

== Demographics ==
As of the 2020 census there were 1,542 people, 716 households, and 521 families residing in the township. The population density was 36.91 inhabitants per square mile (14.25/km^{2}). There were 727 housing units at an average density of 17.40 per square mile (6.72/km^{2}). The racial makeup of the township was 95.27% White, 0.06% African American, 0.13% Native American, 0.06% Asian, 0.00% Pacific Islander, 0.91% from other races, and 3.57% from two or more races. Hispanic or Latino of any race were 1.95% of the population.

There were 716 households, out of which 34.40% had children under the age of 18 living with them, 45.67% were married couples living together, 15.22% had a female householder with no spouse present, and 27.23% were non-families. 25.40% of all households were made up of individuals, and 16.50% had someone living alone who was 65 years of age or older. The average household size was 2.34 and the average family size was 2.61.

The township's age distribution consisted of 26.4% under the age of 18, 5.7% from 18 to 24, 25.8% from 25 to 44, 21.8% from 45 to 64, and 20.3% who were 65 years of age or older. The median age was 41.2 years. For every 100 females, there were 87.9 males. For every 100 females age 18 and over, there were 87.2 males.

The median income for a household in the township was $46,694, and the median income for a family was $61,875. Males had a median income of $40,250 versus $15,644 for females. The per capita income for the township was $22,657. About 16.3% of families and 20.7% of the population were below the poverty line, including 26.4% of those under age 18 and 5.0% of those age 65 or over.

Historical population
Census	Pop.	Note	%±
2010	1,602		—
2020	1,542		−3.7%
U.S. Decennial Census

== School districts ==
- Casey-Westfield Community Unit School District 4C
- Martinsville Community Unit School District 3C

== Political districts ==
- Illinois' 15th congressional district
- State House District 109
- State Senate District 55
