= Casey Township =

Casey Township may refer to the following townships

in the United States:

- Casey Township, Clark County, Illinois

in Canada:

- Casey, Ontario, township in the Timiskaming District
