= Darwin Township =

Darwin Township may refer to the following townships in the United States:

- Darwin Township, Clark County, Illinois
- Darwin Township, Meeker County, Minnesota
