= Orange Township, Clark County, Illinois =

Orange Township
- Township
- Location in Clark County

- Clark County's location in Illinois
- Coordinates: 39°13′22″N 87°50′54″W
- Country: United States
- State: Illinois
- County: Clark
- Established: November 7, 1854

Area
  - Total: 37.13 sq mi (96.2 km^{2})
  - Land: 37.12 sq mi (96.1 km^{2})
  - Water: 0 sq mi (0 km^{2}) 0%
- Elevation: 584 ft (178 m)

Population (2020)
  - Total: 283
  - Density: 7.62/sq mi (2.94/km^{2})
- Time zone: UTC-6 (CST)
  - Summer (DST): UTC-5 (CDT)
- ZIP codes: 62413, 62442, 62478
- FIPS code: 17-023-56302

Orange Township is one of fifteen townships in Clark County, Illinois, USA. As of the 2020 census, its population was 283 and it contained 118 housing units.

== Geography ==
According to the 2010 census, the township has a total area of 37.13 square miles (96.2 km^{2}), all land.

=== Unincorporated towns ===
- Moonshine

(This list is based on USGS data and may include former settlements.)

=== Cemeteries ===
The township contains these four cemeteries: Bennett, Butternut, Olive Branch and Wesley Chapel.

== Demographics ==
As of the 2020 census there were 283 people, 89 households, and 60 families residing in the township. The population density was 7.62 inhabitants per square mile (2.94/km^{2}). There were 118 housing units at an average density of 3.18 per square mile (1.23/km^{2}). The racial makeup of the township was 97.53% White, 0.00% African American, 0.00% Native American, 0.35% Asian, 0.00% Pacific Islander, 0.00% from other races, and 2.12% from two or more races. Hispanic or Latino of any race were 0.71% of the population.

There were 89 households, out of which 23.60% had children under the age of 18 living with them, 67.42% were married couples living together, none had a female householder with no spouse present, and 32.58% were non-families. 32.60% of all households were made up of individuals, and 6.70% had someone living alone who was 65 years of age or older. The average household size was 2.37 and the average family size was 3.03.

The township's age distribution consisted of 26.5% under the age of 18, 1.9% from 18 to 24, 29.3% from 25 to 44, 19.9% from 45 to 64, and 22.3% who were 65 years of age or older. The median age was 34.6 years. For every 100 females, there were 81.9 males. For every 100 females age 18 and over, there were 142.2 males.

The median income for a household in the township was $51,691. Males had a median income of $50,221 versus $7,337 for females. The per capita income for the township was $32,508. About 26.7% of families and 37.4% of the population were below the poverty line, including 85.7% of those under age 18 and none of those age 65 or over.

Historical population
Census	Pop.	Note	%±
2010	230		—
2020	283		23.0%
U.S. Decennial Census

== School districts ==
- Martinsville Community Unit School District 3c

== Political districts ==
- Illinois' 15th congressional district
- State House District 109
- State Senate District 55
