= Walter E. Cork =

American politician and businessman

Walter Edwin Cork (April 29, 1886–December 7, 1958) was an American politician and businessman.

Cork was born on a farm in Walnut Prairie, Illinois, in Clark County, Illinois. He went to the Clark County public schools and to the Marshall Township High School. He worked in the retail merchandise and insurance businesses. Cork also worked as a collector for the Marshall Light & Water Plant. He live with his wife and family in Marshall, Illinois. Cork served in the Illinois House of Representatives from 1925 to 1929 and was a Republican. Cork died at Union Hospital in Terre Haute, Indiana.
