= Douglas Township, Illinois =

Douglas Township may refer to one of the following places in the State of Illinois:

- Douglas Township, Clark County, Illinois
- Douglas Township, Effingham County, Illinois
- Douglas Township, Iroquois County, Illinois

See also

- Douglas Township (disambiguation)
