= Clark Center, Illinois =

Clark Center, Illinois Lodi
- Unincorporated community
- Location within Illinois Location within the United States
- Coordinates: 39°21′45″N 87°46′55″W
- Country: United States
- State: Illinois
- County: Clark
- Elevation: 620 ft (190 m)
- Time zone: UTC-6 (Central (CST))
  - Summer (DST): UTC-5 (CDT)
- Area code: 217
- GNIS feature ID: 406157

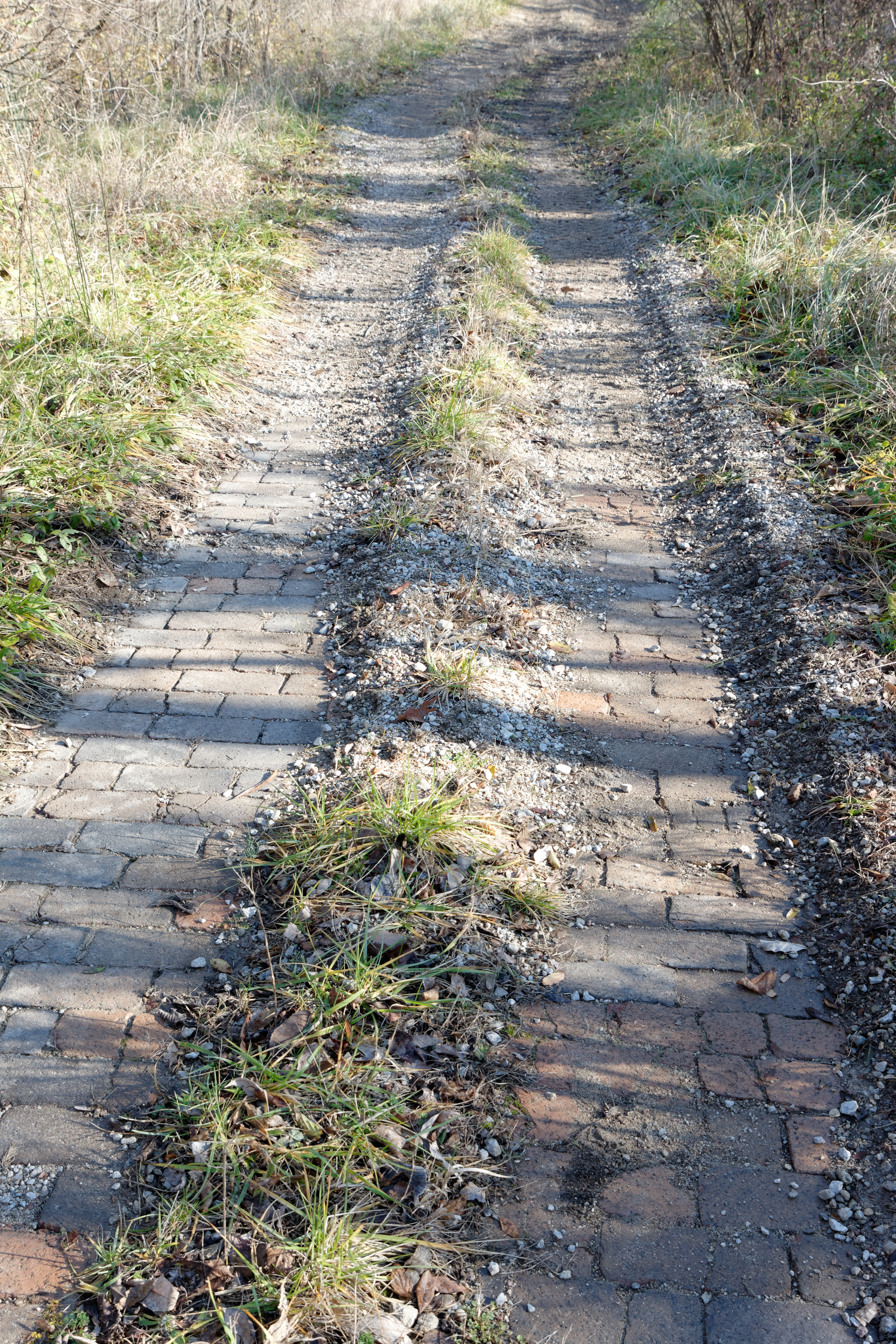
An abandoned part of the old National Road at Clark Center, Illinois.

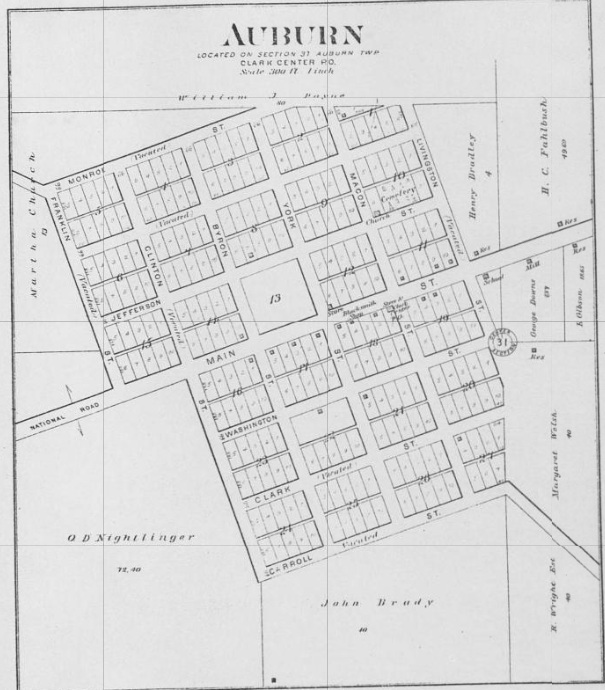
1892 plat map for Auburn (Clark Center P.O.). Many streets already listed as vacated. Streets such as Main, Byron, York, Macon, and Washington, are extant in 2026.

Clark Center is an unincorporated community in Auburn Township, Clark County, Illinois, United States. Clark Center is located on U.S. Route 40 between Marshall and Martinsville.

Laying alongside the route of the new National Road, Clark Center was platted in 1836 as Auburn. In August 1837, it lost a vote to become the new county seat by 453-362 to Marshall, which then became the county seat in 1838. A post office was opened as "Lodi" in 1842. It was changed to "Clarke Centre" in 1857, and "Clark Center" in 1893. The post office closed in 1907.

At one time, Clark Center had two or three grocery stores, a garage, mill, blacksmith shop, tavern, and post office.

== See also ==
- Old Stone Arch Bridge (Clark Center, Illinois)
