= Auburn Township =

Auburn Township may refer to:

== Arkansas ==
- Auburn Township, Lincoln County, Arkansas, in Lincoln County, Arkansas

== Illinois ==
- Auburn Township, Clark County, Illinois
- Auburn Township, Sangamon County, Illinois

== Iowa ==
- Auburn Township, Fayette County, Iowa

== Kansas ==
- Auburn Township, Shawnee County, Kansas, in Shawnee County, Kansas

== Ohio ==
- Auburn Township, Crawford County, Ohio
- Auburn Township, Geauga County, Ohio
- Auburn Township, Tuscarawas County, Ohio

== Pennsylvania ==
- Auburn Township, Pennsylvania
