= Douglas Township, Clark County, Illinois =

Douglas Township
- Township
- Location in Clark County

- Clark County's location in Illinois
- Coordinates: 39°28′10″N 87°44′47″W
- Country: United States
- State: Illinois
- County: Clark

Area
  - Total: 17.64 sq mi (45.7 km^{2})
  - Land: 17.64 sq mi (45.7 km^{2})
  - Water: 0 sq mi (0 km^{2}) 0%
- Elevation: 627 ft (191 m)

Population (2020)
  - Total: 129
  - Density: 7.31/sq mi (2.82/km^{2})
- Time zone: UTC-6 (CST)
  - Summer (DST): UTC-5 (CDT)
- ZIP code: 62441
- FIPS code: 17-023-20461

Douglas Township is one of fifteen townships in Clark County, Illinois, USA. As of the 2020 census, its population was 129 and it contained 68 housing units.

== Geography ==
According to the 2010 census, the township has a total area of 17.64 square miles (45.7 km^{2}), all land.

=== Cities, towns, villages ===
- Marshall (northwest edge)

=== Unincorporated towns ===
- Castle Fin

(This list is based on USGS data and may include former settlements.)

=== Cemeteries ===
The township contains Forsythe Cemetery.

=== Major highways ===
- Illinois Route 1

== Demographics ==
As of the 2020 census there were 129 people, 85 households, and 85 families residing in the township. The population density was 7.30 inhabitants per square mile (2.82/km^{2}). There were 68 housing units at an average density of 3.85 per square mile (1.49/km^{2}). The racial makeup of the township was 96.12% White, 0.00% African American, 0.00% Native American, 0.00% Asian, 0.00% Pacific Islander, 0.78% from other races, and 3.10% from two or more races. Hispanic or Latino of any race were 1.55% of the population.

There were 85 households, out of which 45.90% had children under the age of 18 living with them, 100.00% were married couples living together, 0.00% had a female householder with no spouse present, and 0.00% were non-families. No households were made up of individuals. The average household size was 2.76 and the average family size was 2.76.

The township's age distribution consisted of 30.6% under the age of 18, none from 18 to 24, 29.8% from 25 to 44, 34.4% from 45 to 64, and 5.1% who were 65 years of age or older. The median age was 29.9 years. For every 100 females, there were 147.4 males. For every 100 females age 18 and over, there were 103.8 males.

The median income for a household in the township was $77,014, and the median income for a family was $77,014. Males had a median income of $72,569 versus $36,042 for females. The per capita income for the township was $28,722. None of the population was below the poverty line.

Historical population
Census	Pop.	Note	%±
2010	168		—
2020	129		−23.2%
U.S. Decennial Census

== School districts ==
- Marshall Community Unit School District #C-2

== Political districts ==
- Illinois' 15th congressional district
- State House District 109
- State Senate District 55
