= Clark County Courthouse (Illinois) =

Local government building in the United States

- U.S. Historic district – Contributing property
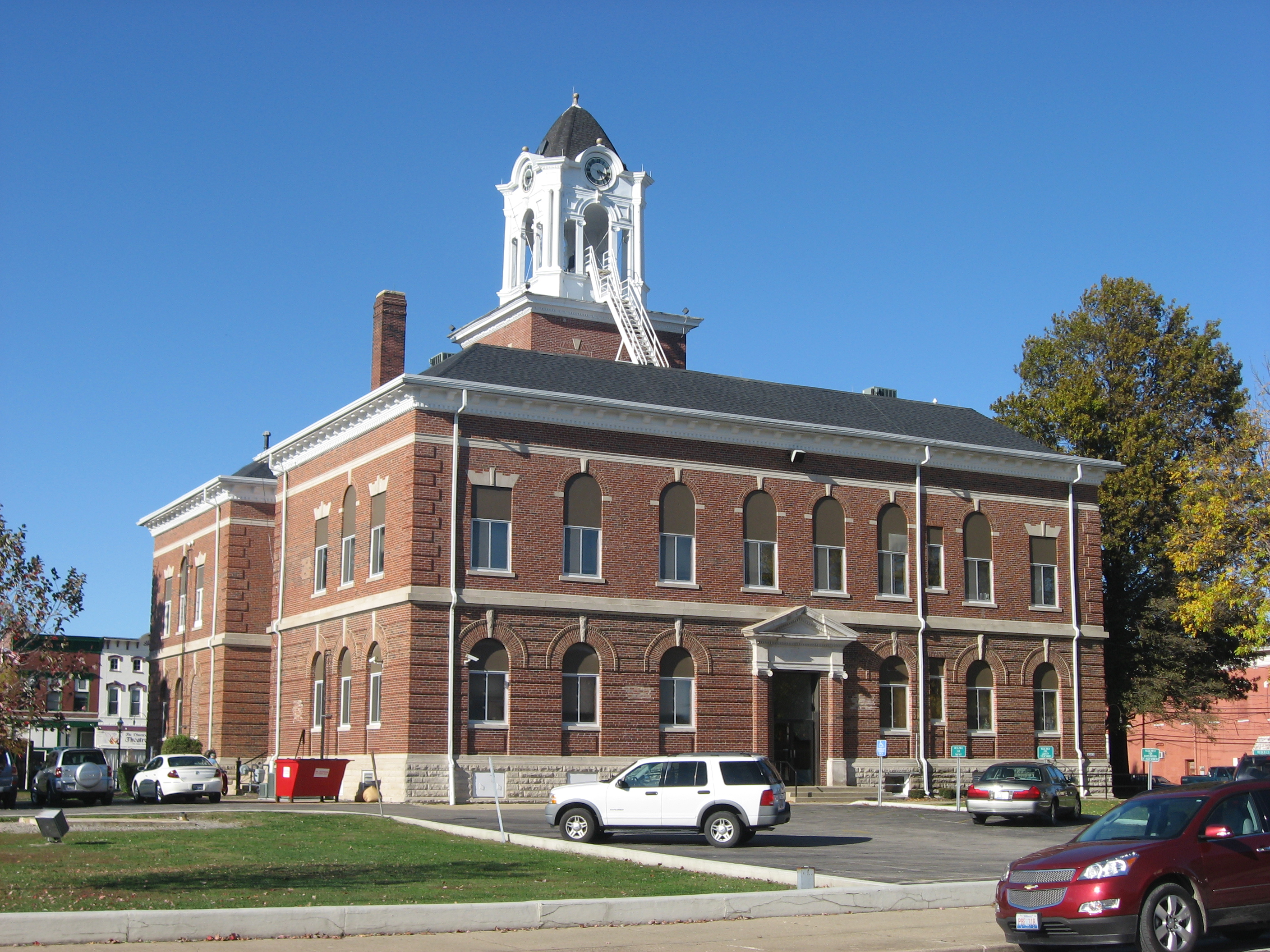
- Rear (left) and southern (right) side of the courthouse

- Location within Illinois Location within the United States
- Interactive map showing the location of Clark County Courthouse
- Location: 501 Archer Avenue, Marshall, Illinois
- Coordinates: 39°23′24″N 87°41′46″W
- Built: 1903
- Architectural style: Italian Renaissance Revival
- Part of: Marshall Business Historic District (ID13000183)
- Added to NRHP: May 24, 2013

The Clark County Courthouse is a government building in Marshall, the county seat of Clark County, Illinois, United States. Completed in 1903, it is the fifth courthouse in the third community in Clark County's history.

== Early history ==
A few Americans tried to settle on the Wabash River north of present-day Palestine circa 1812, but Indians killed them, and the northward advance of civilization was halted until the end of the War of 1812; the first settlers in what became Clark County arrived in 1815. The General Assembly formed Clark County out of Crawford County in 1819, and a commission was appointed to ascertain a location where the new county seat should be founded. The chosen location was named "Aurora", but no proper courthouse was ever built there; the county offices always operated out of a small log building later converted into a corn crib. By an 1823 law, the seat was removed to McClure's Bluff (now Darwin) on the Wabash. Here a 1½-story log courthouse was ordered in 1825 for $600, with a contracted completion date of April 1, 1826; however, only $549 was paid because the builder was more than a year late and failed to meet other specifications. The courthouse was weatherboarded in 1832, the upper floor was fitted as living space, and on weekends the first floor served as a meeting place for a Presbyterian congregation whose pastor lived upstairs.

== New county seat ==
Darwin's location in the corner of the county, far from the new National Road, rendered it inconvenient for the growing population in the northern part of the county. The question was heavily agitated, and few individuals were neutral; two petitions — one for relocation and one against — were circulated countywide in 1835, and virtually every voter signed one or the other. As the majority favored relocation to some point, the General Assembly permitted a vote on the question in 1837, and Marshall defeated Auburn by an 11% margin. A new Federal-style courthouse, the third in Clark County's history, was built there in 1839. It was replaced by a brick building in 1887, using the recent Second Empire style, but this structure served only for a short time — fire destroyed it after just fifteen years of service.

== Current courthouse ==
Following the fire, county officials contracted for the erection of a fifth courthouse in 1903; it was completed by year's end and officially dedicated in 1904. Featuring a rectangular plan, the courthouse is a two-story brick building with a central cupola and clock tower. A stone foundation is raised slightly above the lawn, enabling the basement to benefit from natural light, and the main entrance is accessed by a small set of stairs. The floors are separated by a stone belt course, and a cornice with corbelling supports the edge of the roof on each side. The windows originally featured rounded arches with ornamental keystones, but the original panes have been replaced with rectangular sliding windows and the arches covered over. Above the main entrance is set a Palladian window overlooking a balcony. Except for the entrance and its surroundings, the western (rear) facade is nearly identical to the eastern (front) facade. The building's overall design is predominantly Renaissance Revival in style; many elements resemble those of the earlier Italianate style, but rough stonework on the first story and large quoins are more typical of the later style. On the southern side, a stairway provides access from the roof to the bell tower, and a bandstand sits on the northeastern corner of the lawn.

== Historic site ==
Much of central Marshall was designated a historic district and listed on the National Register of Historic Places in 2013. The courthouse was designated a contributing property within the district, as was the bandstand, and many of the other contributing properties are smaller buildings that face the courthouse square.
