= Dolson Township, Clark County, Illinois =

Dolson Township
- Township
- Location in Clark County

- Clark County's location in Illinois
- Coordinates: 39°26′49″N 87°50′32″W
- Country: United States
- State: Illinois
- County: Clark
- Established: November 7, 1854

Area
  - Total: 35.73 sq mi (92.5 km^{2})
  - Land: 34.48 sq mi (89.3 km^{2})
  - Water: 1.25 sq mi (3.2 km^{2}) 3.50%
- Elevation: 666 ft (203 m)

Population (2020)
  - Total: 353
  - Density: 10.2/sq mi (3.95/km^{2})
- Time zone: UTC-6 (CST)
  - Summer (DST): UTC-5 (CDT)
- ZIP codes: 61933, 62441, 62442
- FIPS code: 17-023-20279

Dolson Township is one of fifteen townships in Clark County, Illinois, USA. As of the 2020 census, its population was 353 and it contained 204 housing units.

== Geography ==
According to the 2010 census, the township has a total area of 35.73 square miles (92.5 km^{2}), of which 34.48 square miles (89.3 km^{2}) (or 96.50%) is land and 1.25 square miles (3.2 km^{2}) (or 3.50%) is water.

=== Unincorporated towns ===
- Clarksville
- Doyles

(This list is based on USGS data and may include former settlements.)

=== Cemeteries ===
The township contains these seven cemeteries: Bluegrass, Clarksville Baptist, Cupps, Davis, Ennis, Green Moss and Shiloh.

== Demographics ==
As of the 2020 census there were 353 people, 130 households, and 122 families residing in the township. The population density was 9.86 inhabitants per square mile (3.81/km^{2}). There were 204 housing units at an average density of 5.70 per square mile (2.20/km^{2}). The racial makeup of the township was 98.02% White, 0.00% African American, 0.28% Native American, 0.00% Asian, 0.00% Pacific Islander, 0.00% from other races, and 1.70% from two or more races. Hispanic or Latino of any race were 0.00% of the population.

There were 130 households, out of which 24.60% had children under the age of 18 living with them, 63.85% were married couples living together, 30.00% had a female householder with no spouse present, and 6.15% were non-families. 6.20% of all households were made up of individuals, and 6.20% had someone living alone who was 65 years of age or older. The average household size was 2.39 and the average family size was 2.14.

The township's age distribution consisted of 10.3% under the age of 18, 18.3% from 18 to 24, 24.7% from 25 to 44, 17.7% from 45 to 64, and 28.9% who were 65 years of age or older. The median age was 29.0 years. For every 100 females, there were 137.4 males. For every 100 females age 18 and over, there were 119.7 males.

The median income for a household in the township was $57,386, and the median income for a family was $64,000. Males had a median income of $37,083 versus $21,932 for females. The per capita income for the township was $30,119. None of the population was below the poverty line.

Historical population
Census	Pop.	Note	%±
2010	353		—
2020	353		0.0%
U.S. Decennial Census

== School districts ==
- Marshall Community Unit School District 2c
- Martinsville Community Unit School District 3c

== Political districts ==
- Illinois' 15th congressional district
- State House District 109
- State Senate District 55
