= Marshall Township, Clark County, Illinois =

Marshall Township
- Township
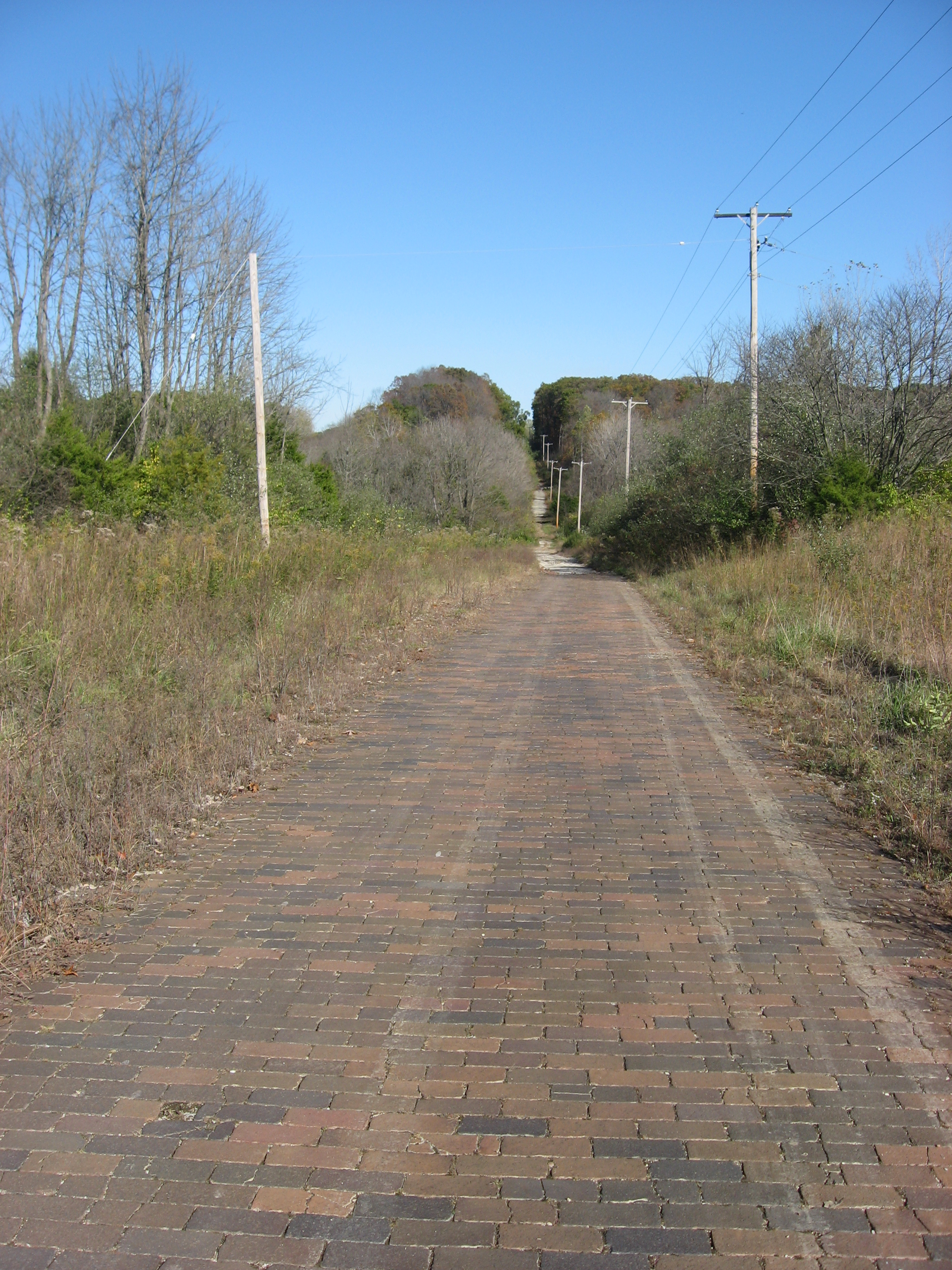
- A portion of the former National Road in far western Marshall Township

- Location in Clark County

- Clark County's location in Illinois
- Coordinates: 39°24′08″N 87°44′14″W
- Country: United States
- State: Illinois
- County: Clark
- Established: November 7, 1854

Area
  - Total: 31.81 sq mi (82.4 km^{2})
  - Land: 31.72 sq mi (82.2 km^{2})
  - Water: 0.09 sq mi (0.23 km^{2}) 0.28%
- Elevation: 568 ft (173 m)

Population (2020)
  - Total: 4,581
  - Density: 144.4/sq mi (55.76/km^{2})
- Time zone: UTC-6 (CST)
  - Summer (DST): UTC-5 (CDT)
- ZIP code: 62441
- FIPS code: 17-023-47176

Marshall Township is one of fifteen townships in Clark County, Illinois, USA. As of the 2020 census, its population was 4,581 and it contained 2,144 housing units.

== Geography ==
According to the 2010 census, the township has a total area of 31.81 square miles (82.4 km^{2}), of which 31.72 square miles (82.2 km^{2}) (or 99.72%) is land and 0.09 square miles (0.23 km^{2}) (or 0.28%) is water.

=== Cities, towns, villages ===
- Marshall (west three-quarters)

=== Unincorporated towns ===
(This list is based on USGS data and may include former settlements.)

=== Cemeteries ===
The township contains these four cemeteries: Marshall, Marshall City, Mitchell and Saint Marys.

=== Major highways ===
- Interstate 70
- U.S. Route 40
- Illinois Route 1

=== Landmarks ===
- Lincoln Trail State Park (north quarter)

== Demographics ==
As of the 2020 census there were 4,581 people, 1,865 households, and 1,360 families residing in the township. The population density was 144.07 inhabitants per square mile (55.63/km^{2}). There were 2,144 housing units at an average density of 67.43 per square mile (26.03/km^{2}). The racial makeup of the township was 93.67% White, 0.68% African American, 0.24% Native American, 0.70% Asian, 0.00% Pacific Islander, 1.31% from other races, and 3.41% from two or more races. Hispanic or Latino of any race were 2.77% of the population.

There were 1,865 households, out of which 36.50% had children under the age of 18 living with them, 45.04% were married couples living together, 22.63% had a female householder with no spouse present, and 27.08% were non-families. 20.80% of all households were made up of individuals, and 11.80% had someone living alone who was 65 years of age or older. The average household size was 2.33 and the average family size was 2.63.

The township's age distribution consisted of 24.0% under the age of 18, 7.2% from 18 to 24, 22.7% from 25 to 44, 23.9% from 45 to 64, and 22.4% who were 65 years of age or older. The median age was 40.8 years. For every 100 females, there were 90.8 males. For every 100 females age 18 and over, there were 87.3 males.

The median income for a household in the township was $55,360, and the median income for a family was $66,131. Males had a median income of $44,779 versus $31,467 for females. The per capita income for the township was $30,956. About 10.4% of families and 9.0% of the population were below the poverty line, including 10.6% of those under age 18 and 1.8% of those age 65 or over.

Historical population
Census	Pop.	Note	%±
2010	4,574		—
2020	4,581		0.2%
U.S. Decennial Census

== School districts ==
- Marshall Community Unit School District #C-2

== Political districts ==
- Illinois' 15th congressional district
- State House District 110
- State Senate District 55

== Sources ==
- Perrin, William Henry, ed.. History of Crawford and Clark Counties, Illinois Chicago, Illinois. O. L. Baskin & Co. (1883)..
