= Old Stone Arch Bridge (Clark Center, Illinois) =

- U.S. National Register of Historic Places
- Location within Illinois Location within the United States
- Nearest city: Clark Center, Illinois
- Coordinates: 39.370239°N 87.758085°W
- Area: less than one acre
- Built by: Army Corps of Engineers
- NRHP reference No.: 78001117
- Added to NRHP: November 28, 1978

The Old Stone Arch Bridge was a stone arch bridge located along the former route of the National Road in Clark Center, Illinois. The limestone bridge was 8.9 feet (2.7 m) high and 81.5 feet (24.8 m) long with a 17.8-foot (5.4 m) span. The U.S. Army Corps of Engineers built the bridge between 1828 and 1837, the period in which the Corps improved much of the National Road. The National Road was the first major highway built by the U.S. government and brought settlers and goods from the Eastern United States to Illinois. The bridge became part the Illinois state highway system in 1918, and later became part of U.S. Route 40; it served road traffic until 1933, when US 40 was realigned through the area.

The bridge was added to the National Register of Historic Places on November 28, 1978.

== See also ==
- Old Stone Arch (Marshall, Illinois), also on National Road and NRHP-listed
- List of bridges on the National Register of Historic Places in Illinois
- National Register of Historic Places listings in Clark County, Illinois
