= Darwin, Illinois =

- Unincorporated community
- Location within Illinois Location within the United States
- Coordinates: 39°17′00″N 87°36′43″W
- Country: United States
- State: Illinois
- County: Clark
- Elevation: 466 ft (142 m)
- Time zone: UTC-6 (Central (CST))
  - Summer (DST): UTC-5 (CDT)
- Area code: 217
- GNIS feature ID: 406956

Darwin is an unincorporated community in Darwin Township, Clark County, Illinois, United States. Darwin is located along the Wabash River across from the state of Indiana.

Darwin was originally called McClare's Bluff, and under the latter name had its start in the 1820s. It became the county seat of Clark County in 1823, and the first Clark County Courthouse was built there in 1827. Local government remained in Darwin until relocating to Marshall following an 1837 referendum.
