= Old Stone Arch (Marshall, Illinois) =

Historic bridge in Illinois, US

- Old Stone Arch, National Road
- U.S. National Register of Historic Places
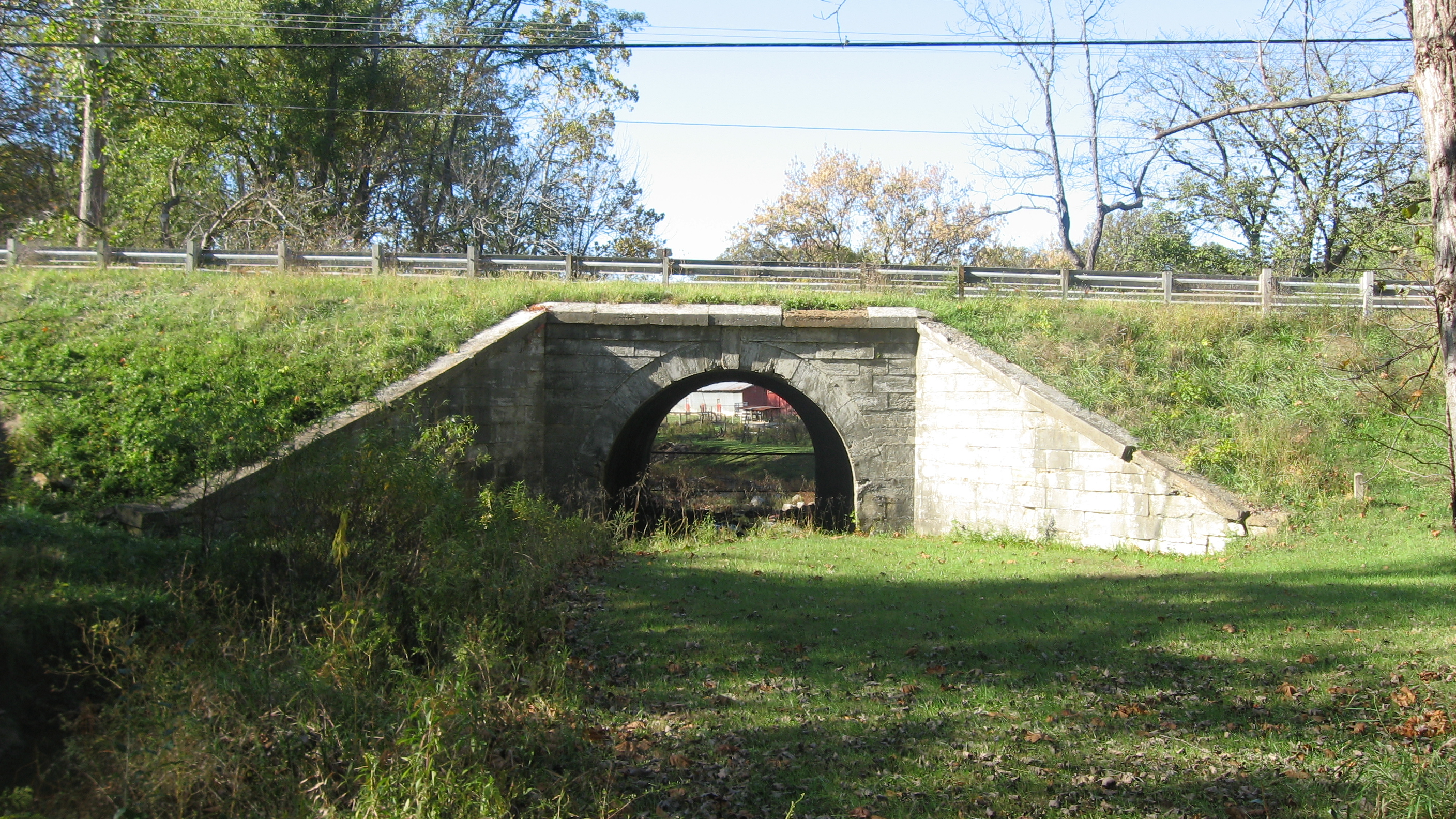

- Location within Illinois Location within the United States
- Nearest city: Marshall, Illinois
- Coordinates: 39°23′11.8″N 87°42′30″W
- Area: 0.5 acres (0.20 ha)
- Built by: Army Corps of Engineers
- NRHP reference No.: 75000643
- Added to NRHP: February 20, 1975

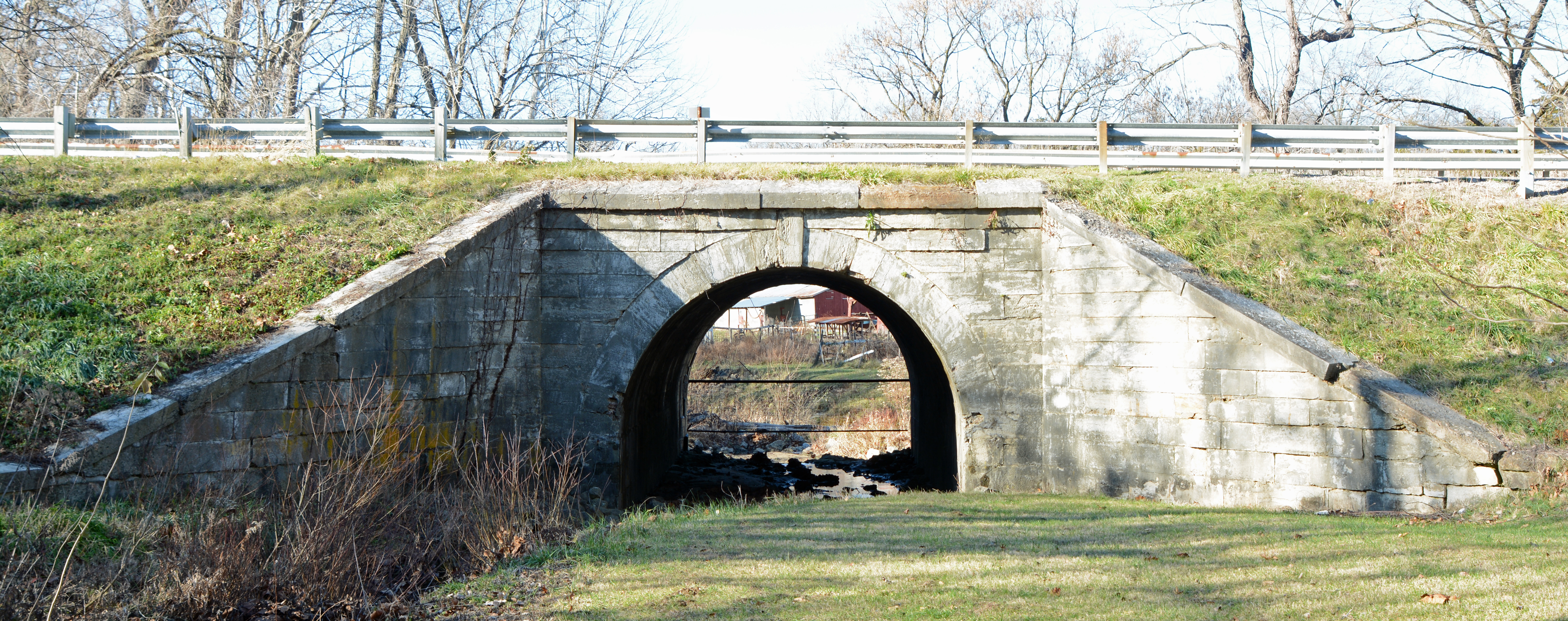
Old Stone Arch Bridge in 2015

The Old Stone Arch is a stone arch bridge along the former route of the National Road in Marshall, Illinois. The limestone bridge is 13.5 feet (4.1 m) high and 15 feet (4.6 m) across. The U.S. Army Corps of Engineers built the bridge between 1828 and 1837, the period in which the Corps rebuilt much of the National Road. The National Road, the most-traveled U.S. road in the early 1800s and the first built by the U.S. government, connected Illinois to the Eastern United States and helped bring settlers and goods to the state during its early years. The bridge has served road traffic continuously since its construction and was part of U.S. Route 40 from the route's creation to 1953.

The bridge was added to the National Register of Historic Places on February 20, 1975.

== See also ==
- Old Stone Arch Bridge (Clark Center, Illinois), also on the National Road, also NRHP-listed
- List of bridges on the National Register of Historic Places in Illinois
- National Register of Historic Places listings in Clark County, Illinois
