= Adenmoor, Illinois =

- Unincorporated community
- Location within Illinois Location within the United States
- Coordinates: 39°21′57″N 87°47′48″W
- Country: United States
- State: Illinois
- County: Clark
- Elevation: 620 ft (190 m)
- Time zone: UTC-6 (Central (CST))
  - Summer (DST): UTC-5 (CDT)
- Area code: 217
- GNIS feature ID: 422414

Adenmoor is an unincorporated community in Clark County, Illinois, United States. Adenmoor is located along a railroad line northeast of Martinsville.
