= Casey Township, Clark County, Illinois =

Casey Township
- Township
- Location in Clark County

- Clark County's location in Illinois
- Coordinates: 39°18′18″N 87°57′33″W
- Country: United States
- State: Illinois
- County: Clark
- Established: November 7, 1854

Area
  - Total: 36.36 sq mi (94.2 km^{2})
  - Land: 36.22 sq mi (93.8 km^{2})
  - Water: 0.14 sq mi (0.36 km^{2}) 0.39%
- Elevation: 630 ft (192 m)

Population (2020)
  - Total: 3,459
  - Density: 95.50/sq mi (36.87/km^{2})
- Time zone: UTC-6 (CST)
  - Summer (DST): UTC-5 (CDT)
- ZIP codes: 62420, 62442
- FIPS code: 17-023-11631
- Website: caseytownship.org

Casey Township is one of fifteen townships in Clark County, Illinois, USA. As of the 2020 census, its population was 3,459 and it contained 1,705 housing units. Casey Township changed its name from Cumberland in September 1876.

== Geography ==
According to the 2010 census, the township has a total area of 36.36 square miles (94.2 km^{2}), of which 36.22 square miles (93.8 km^{2}) (or 99.61%) is land and 0.14 square miles (0.36 km^{2}) (or 0.39%) is water.

=== Cities, towns, villages ===
- Casey (vast majority)
- Martinsville (west edge)

=== Unincorporated towns ===
- Cumberland

(This list is based on USGS data and may include former settlements.)

=== Cemeteries ===
The township contains these five cemeteries: Blackburn, Casey City, Connelly, Cumberland Baptist and Washington.

=== Major highways ===
- Interstate 70
- U.S. Route 40
- Illinois Route 49

=== Airports and landing strips ===
- Casey Municipal Airport

== Demographics ==
As of the 2020 census there were 3,459 people, 1,751 households, and 1,088 families residing in the township. The population density was 95.13 inhabitants per square mile (36.73/km^{2}). There were 1,705 housing units at an average density of 46.89 per square mile (18.10/km^{2}). The racial makeup of the township was 96.56% White, 0.46% African American, 0.09% Native American, 0.17% Asian, 0.00% Pacific Islander, 0.23% from other races, and 2.49% from two or more races. Hispanic or Latino of any race were 1.47% of the population.

There were 1,751 households, out of which 31.40% had children under the age of 18 living with them, 49.97% were married couples living together, 9.19% had a female householder with no spouse present, and 37.86% were non-families. 30.70% of all households were made up of individuals, and 13.50% had someone living alone who was 65 years of age or older. The average household size was 2.08 and the average family size was 2.60.

The township's age distribution consisted of 19.9% under the age of 18, 11.9% from 18 to 24, 22.7% from 25 to 44, 26.8% from 45 to 64, and 18.6% who were 65 years of age or older. The median age was 39.2 years. For every 100 females, there were 89.5 males. For every 100 females age 18 and over, there were 88.9 males.

The median income for a household in the township was $49,375, and the median income for a family was $70,691. Males had a median income of $39,301 versus $25,914 for females. The per capita income for the township was $30,447. About 7.2% of families and 6.7% of the population were below the poverty line, including 8.5% of those under age 18 and 4.1% of those age 65 or over.

Historical population
Census	Pop.	Note	%±
2010	3,958		—
2020	3,459		−12.6%
U.S. Decennial Census

== School districts ==
- Casey-Westfield Community Unit School District 4c
- Martinsville Community Unit School District 3c

== Political districts ==
- Illinois' 15th congressional district
- State House District 109
- State Senate District 55
