= Marshall Business Historic District =

Historic district in Illinois, United States

- U.S. National Register of Historic Places
- U.S. Historic district
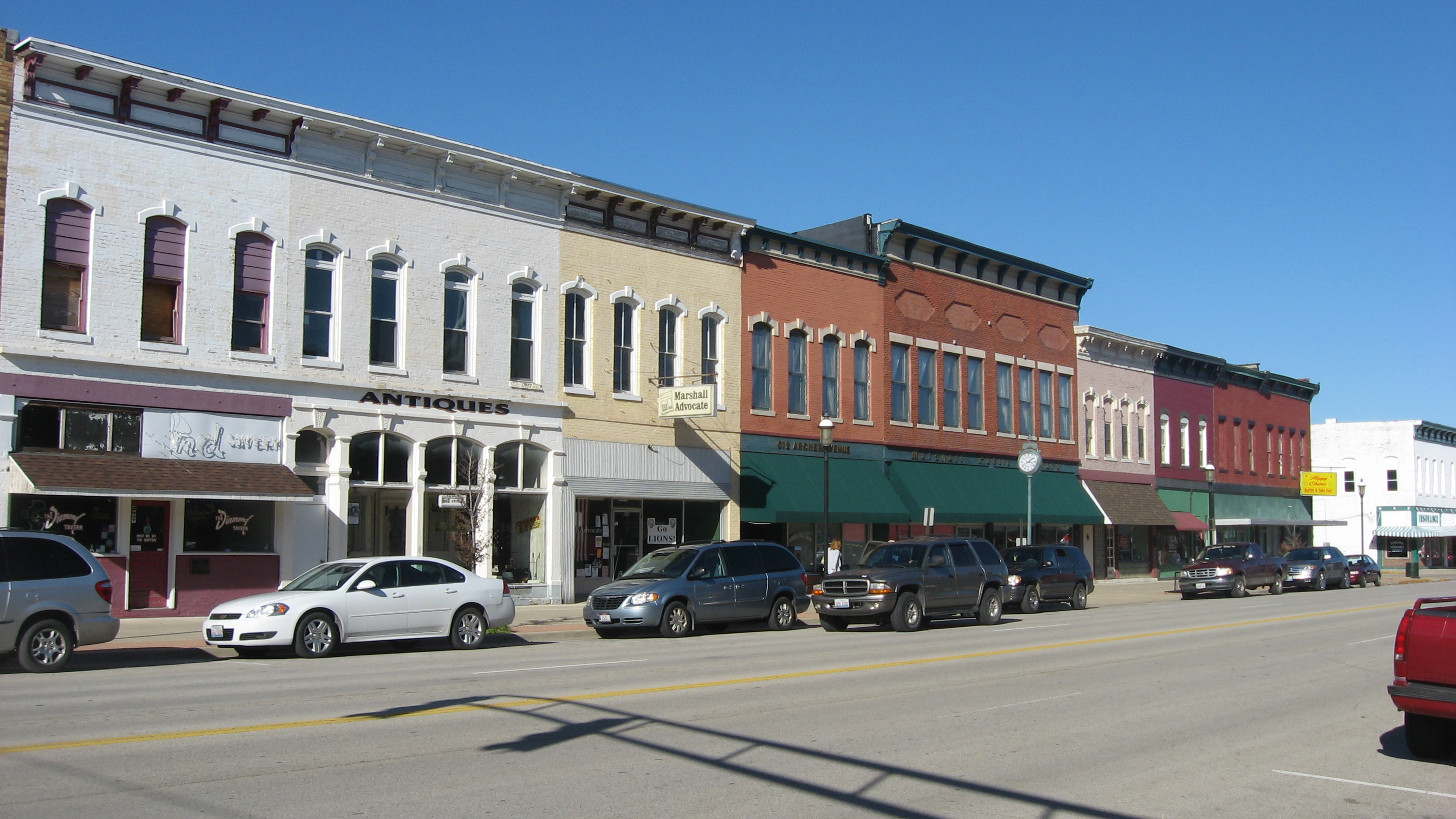
- The north side of the 600 block of Archer Avenue

- Location within Illinois Location within the United States
- Location: Archer Ave. and the area between Plum, S. 5th, Locust, and Michigan Aves., Marshall, Illinois
- Coordinates: 39°23′27″N 87°41′44″W
- Architectural style: Italianate, Romanesque, Italian Renaissance Revival
- NRHP reference No.: 13000183
- Added to NRHP: May 24, 2013

The Marshall Business Historic District is a historic district located in downtown Marshall, Illinois. The district encompasses the city's historic commercial center and includes 56 buildings and structures, 46 of which are contributing buildings. Marshall's courthouse square is a central feature of the district; the square includes the Italian Renaissance Revival Clark County Courthouse, which was built in 1903. The other buildings in the district, mainly commercial and government buildings, were built from the 1830s to the 1960s; however, most of the buildings were built between 1870 and 1910, Marshall's largest growth period. The buildings from this era are mostly designed in the Italianate, Romanesque, and Italian Renaissance Revival styles.

The district was added to the National Register of Historic Places on May 24, 2013.

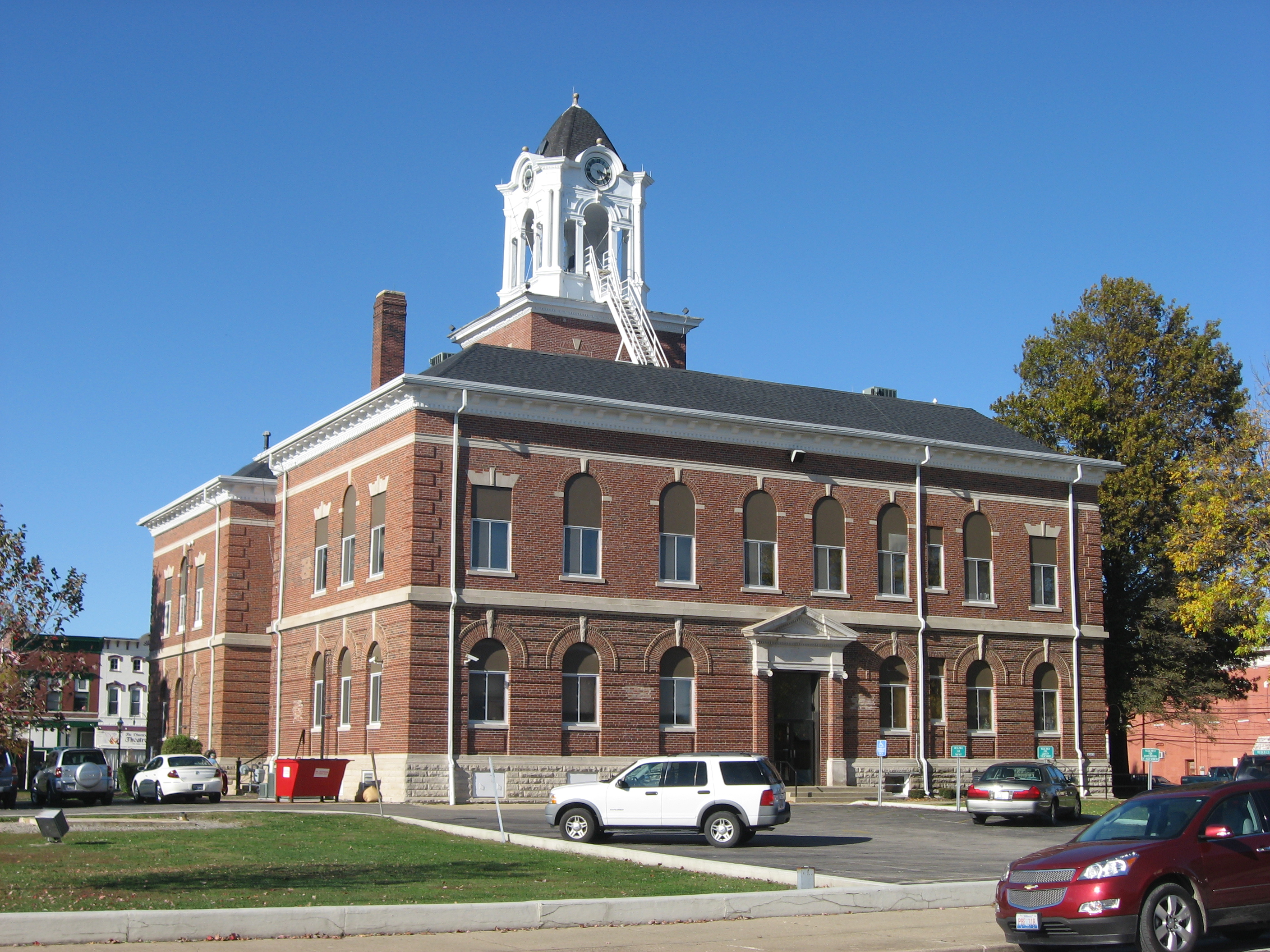
Clark County Courthouse
