= York, Illinois =

- Unincorporated community
- Location within Illinois Location within the United States
- Coordinates: 39°10′17″N 87°38′21″W
- Country: United States
- State: Illinois
- County: Clark
- Elevation: 453 ft (138 m)
- Time zone: UTC-6 (Central (CST))
  - Summer (DST): UTC-5 (CDT)
- Area code: 217
- GNIS feature ID: 421580

York is an unincorporated community in Clark County, Illinois, United States. York is located along the Wabash River in far southeast Clark County.
