= West Union, Illinois =

West Union
- Census-designated place
- Location within the state of Illinois
- Coordinates: 39°12′49″N 87°40′00″W
- Country: United States
- State: Illinois
- County: Clark

Area
  - Total: 1.81 sq mi (4.68 km^{2})
  - Land: 1.81 sq mi (4.68 km^{2})
  - Water: 0 sq mi (0.00 km^{2})
- Elevation: 426 ft (130 m)

Population (2020)
  - Total: 271
  - Density: 150/sq mi (57.9/km^{2})
- Time zone: UTC-6 (Central (CST))
  - Summer (DST): UTC-5 (CDT)
- ZIP codes: 62477
- FIPS code: 17-80879
- GNIS feature ID: 2628562

West Union is an unincorporated census-designated place located in York Township in the southeast corner of Clark County, Illinois, on Illinois Route 1. Its postal zip code is 62477. As of the 2020 census, its population was 271.

== Geography ==
According to the 2021 census gazetteer files, West Union has a total area of 1.81 square miles (4.69 km^{2}), all land.

== Demographics ==
Historical population
Census	Pop.	Note	%±
2010	288		—
2020	271		−5.9%
U.S. Decennial Census

As of the 2020 census there were 271 people, 82 households, and 73 families residing in the CDP. The population density was 149.89 inhabitants per square mile (57.87/km^{2}). There were 123 housing units at an average density of 68.03 units per square mile (26.27 units/km^{2}). The racial makeup of the CDP was 95.20% White, 0.37% Asian, 2.21% from other races, and 2.21% from two or more races. Hispanic or Latino of any race were 0.37% of the population.

There were 82 households, out of which 39.0% had children under the age of 18 living with them, 69.51% were married couples living together, none had a female householder with no husband present, and 10.98% were non-families. 10.98% of all households were made up of individuals, and none had someone living alone who was 65 years of age or older. The average household size was 2.73, and the average family size was 2.94.

The CDP's age distribution consisted of 26.1% under the age of 18, 8.3% from 18 to 24, 37.3% from 25 to 44, 12.4% from 45 to 64, and 15.8% who were 65 years of age or older. The median age was 40.1 years. For every 100 females, there were 86.8 males. For every 100 females age 18 and over, there were 102.3 males.

The median income for a household in the CDP was $48,929, and the median income for a family was $63,250. Males had a median income of $22,143 versus $3,333 for females. The per capita income for the CDP was $18,080. About 12.3% of families and 15.0% of the population were below the poverty line, including 12.2% of those under age 18 and none of those age 65 or over.
