= Clarksville, Illinois =

Clarksville
- Unincorporated community
- Location of Clark within Illinois Clarksville (the United States)
- Coordinates: 39°27′06″N 87°47′52″W
- Country: United States
- State: Illinois
- County: Clark
- Established: 1851
- Elevation: 656 ft (200 m)
- Time zone: UTC-6 (CST)
  - Summer (DST): UTC-5 (CDT)
- GNIS feature ID: 406177

Clarksville is an unincorporated community on the northern edge of Clark County, Illinois in Dolson Township, approximately seven miles (or 11 kilometers) northwest of the city of Marshall, in east central Illinois.

== History ==
Clarksville was surveyed and platted in 1851. In its 1880s heyday it hosted the usual variety of services for local farmers and other inhabitants including a blacksmith, general store, school and church. Only the latter (Clarksville Baptist Church, with a Southern Baptist affiliation) has persisted to the present day. Its century-old previous structure was recently vacated in favor of a larger new building completed in 2005. A cemetery between the two structures houses the remains of settlers and area inhabitants, some born in the 18th century.

After decades of decline as increased mobility made small local shops uncompetitive with the larger facilities in nearby towns, Clarksville is enjoying a modest resurgence in population. The damming of Mill Creek directly to the south of the village, and the establishment of an extensive county park along the lake have created demand for several modestly upscale new subdivisions along the north edge of Mill Creek Lake. Several storage facilities provide frequent visitors to the park a means of warehousing their boats near the lake, and a small restaurant/bait shop provides park visitors and locals with a social outlet.
