= Auburn Township, Clark County, Illinois =

Auburn Township
- Township
- Location in Clark County

- Clark County's location in Illinois
- Coordinates: 39°21′50″N 87°48′37″W
- Country: United States
- State: Illinois
- County: Clark

Area
  - Total: 15.82 sq mi (41.0 km^{2})
  - Land: 15.79 sq mi (40.9 km^{2})
  - Water: 0.03 sq mi (0.078 km^{2}) 0.19%
- Elevation: 650 ft (198 m)

Population (2020)
  - Total: 230
  - Density: 15/sq mi (5.6/km^{2})
- Time zone: UTC-6 (CST)
  - Summer (DST): UTC-5 (CDT)
- ZIP codes: 62441, 62442
- FIPS code: 17-023-02908

Auburn Township is one of fifteen townships in the center of Clark County, Illinois, USA. As of the 2020 census, its population was 230 and it contained 114 housing units.

== History ==
Auburn Township was created in 1859 and consisted of land taken from Anderson, Dolson, Marshall and Martinsville Townships in Clark County. According to the History of Crawford and Clark Counties, Illinois, the creation was the result of gerrymandering to facilitate the election of an unidentified influential person to be a justice of the peace. The township was named for the already existing village of Auburn.

The village of Auburn had vied with the town of Marshall as the seat of Clark County. Auburn had the advantage of being centrally located. However, Marshall had the larger population and received more votes. Auburn's defeat has been blamed for ruining the village's dreams of growth.

== Geography ==
According to the 2010 census, the township has a total area of 15.82 square miles (41.0 km^{2}), of which 15.79 square miles (40.9 km^{2}) (or 99.81%) is land and 0.03 square miles (0.078 km^{2}) (or 0.19%) is water.

=== Unincorporated towns ===
- Adenmoor
- Auburn (village)
- Clark Center

(This list is based on USGS data and may include former settlements.)

=== Major highways ===
- Interstate 70
- U.S. Route 40

== Demographics ==
As of the 2020 census there were 230 people, 160 households, and 84 families residing in the township. The population density was 14.53 inhabitants per square mile (5.61/km^{2}). There were 114 housing units at an average density of 7.20 per square mile (2.78/km^{2}). The racial makeup of the township was 96.52% White, 0.00% African American, 0.43% Native American, 0.43% Asian, 0.00% Pacific Islander, 0.00% from other races, and 2.61% from two or more races. Hispanic or Latino of any race were 0.00% of the population.

There were 160 households, out of which 10.60% had children under the age of 18 living with them, 52.50% were married couples living together, none had a female householder with no spouse present, and 47.50% were non-families. 47.50% of all households were made up of individuals, and none had someone living alone who was 65 years of age or older. The average household size was 1.74 and the average family size was 2.42.

The township's age distribution consisted of 10.8% under the age of 18, 8.2% from 18 to 24, 12.9% from 25 to 44, 39.8% from 45 to 64, and 28.3% who were 65 years of age or older. The median age was 61.8 years. For every 100 females, there were 130.6 males. For every 100 females age 18 and over, there were 132.7 males.

The median income for a family in the township was $97,805. Males had a median income of $4,340 versus $45,815 for females. The per capita income for the township was $34,968. None of the population was below the poverty line.

Historical population
Census	Pop.	Note	%±
2010	242		—
2020	230		−5.0%
U.S. Decennial Census

== School districts ==
- Marshall Community Unit School District 2c
- Martinsville Community Unit School District 3c

== Political districts ==
- Illinois' 15th congressional district
- State House District 109
- State Senate District 55
