= Castle Fin, Illinois =

- Unincorporated community
- Location within Illinois Location within the United States
- Coordinates: 39°28′12″N 87°44′00″W
- Country: United States
- State: Illinois
- County: Clark
- Elevation: 630 ft (190 m)
- Time zone: UTC-6 (Central (CST))
  - Summer (DST): UTC-5 (CDT)
- Area code: 217
- GNIS feature ID: 422534

Castle Fin is an unincorporated community in Clark County, Illinois, United States. Castle Fin is 7 miles (11 km) north-northwest of Marshall. The community was founded by Robert Wilson and platted in 1848. Wilson named Castle Fin after his hometown of Castlefin in County Donegal, Ireland.

Since 2010, it has been home to a winery and event venue.
