= Darwin Township, Clark County, Illinois =

Darwin Township
- Township
- Location in Clark County

- Clark County's location in Illinois
- Coordinates: 39°18′21″N 87°38′23″W
- Country: United States
- State: Illinois
- County: Clark
- Established: November 7, 1854

Area
  - Total: 27.58 sq mi (71.4 km^{2})
  - Land: 27.15 sq mi (70.3 km^{2})
  - Water: 0.43 sq mi (1.1 km^{2}) 1.56%
- Elevation: 532 ft (162 m)

Population (2020)
  - Total: 347
  - Density: 12.8/sq mi (4.93/km^{2})
- Time zone: UTC-6 (CST)
  - Summer (DST): UTC-5 (CDT)
- ZIP codes: 62441, 62477
- FIPS code: 17-023-18680
- GNIS feature ID: 0428874

Darwin Township is located along the Wabash River in eastern Clark County, Illinois, USA. As of the 2020 census, its population was 347 and it contained 148 housing units. The township was named for the village of Darwin, which was named for the English scientist, Charles Darwin.

== Geography ==
According to the 2010 census, the township has a total area of 27.58 square miles (71.4 km^{2}), of which 27.15 square miles (70.3 km^{2}) (or 98.44%) is land and 0.43 square miles (1.1 km^{2}) (or 1.56%) is water.

=== Unincorporated towns ===
- Darwin

=== Cemeteries ===
The township contains these three cemeteries: Bubeck, Darwin and Hall.

=== Major highways ===
- Illinois Route 1

=== Rivers ===
- Wabash River

== Demographics ==
As of the 2020 census there were 347 people, 176 households, and 176 families residing in the township. The population density was 12.58 inhabitants per square mile (4.86/km^{2}). There were 148 housing units at an average density of 5.37 per square mile (2.07/km^{2}). The racial makeup of the township was 95.68% White, 0.00% African American, 0.29% Native American, 0.00% Asian, 0.00% Pacific Islander, 0.29% from other races, and 3.75% from two or more races. Hispanic or Latino of any race were 0.29% of the population.

There were 176 households, out of which 58.00% had children under the age of 18 living with them, 77.27% were married couples living together, none had a female householder with no spouse present, and none were non-families. No households were made up of individuals. The average household size was 2.62 and the average family size was 2.62.

The township's age distribution consisted of 35.8% under the age of 18, 2.8% from 18 to 24, 2.2% from 25 to 44, 50.5% from 45 to 64, and 8.7% who were 65 years of age or older. The median age was 46.5 years. For every 100 females, there were 182.8 males. For every 100 females age 18 and over, there were 174.1 males.

The median income for a household in the township was $68,981, and the median income for a family was $68,981. Males had a median income of $67,716 versus $38,750 for females. The per capita income for the township was $24,015. About 11.9% of families and 11.3% of the population were below the poverty line, including 10.9% of those under age 18 and 52.5% of those age 65 or over.

Historical population
Census	Pop.	Note	%±
2010	342		—
2020	347		1.5%
U.S. Decennial Census

== School districts ==
- Marshall Community Unit School District 2c

== Political districts ==
- Illinois' 15th congressional district
- State House District 109
- State Senate District 55
