= Moonshine, Illinois =

Town in Illinois, United States

Moonshine
- Unincorporated town
- Location of Moonshine within Illinois Moonshine (the United States)
- Coordinates: 39°11′26″N 87°53′44″W
- Country: United States
- State: Illinois
- County: Clark
- Elevation: 568 ft (173 m)

Population (2000)
  - Total: 2
- Time zone: UTC-6 (CST)
  - Summer (DST): UTC-5 (CDT)
- GNIS feature ID: 422996

Moonshine is an unincorporated town located in Clark County, Illinois, United States. It has been featured on the CBS Sunday Morning Show. There is only one building in the entire town (not including the outhouse), and this was a grocery store built in 1912. It was later sold to Helen and Roy Tuttle in 1982, who created a restaurant that serves their famous Moonburger. One feature is that the store/restaurant has a guest-book with visitors from all 50 states and around the world. During the 2017 Terry Hammond Memorial Moonshine Lunchrun, a new record of 3362 sandwiches were served.

== Geography ==
The location of Moonshine is published on United States Geological Survey topographical maps as well as the Geographic Names Information System (GNIS). It is GNIS feature ID 422996 and is listed as a populated place. GNIS lists the Moonshine at 39°11′26″N 087°53′44″W.

According to the Houston Chronicle, as of 1987, Moonshine was a dry town. The article also offered two alternative theories on the origin of town's name. One version attributes its name to the "moon shining on swampy land near the store." While another version attributed to a long time local resident states that a family from Philadelphia named it in the 1850s to honor locations in Pennsylvania.

== Demographics ==
Moonshine is not a census-designated place, but is locally described as "a wide spot in the road" with a population of 2. As of 2015, Moonshine has only one resident, a widow.
