= Parker Township, Clark County, Illinois =

Parker Township
- Township
- Location in Clark County

- Clark County's location in Illinois
- Coordinates: 39°23′12″N 87°56′54″W
- Country: United States
- State: Illinois
- County: Clark
- Established: November 7, 1854

Area
  - Total: 35.93 sq mi (93.1 km^{2})
  - Land: 35.88 sq mi (92.9 km^{2})
  - Water: 0.04 sq mi (0.10 km^{2}) 0.11%
- Elevation: 659 ft (201 m)

Population (2020)
  - Total: 167
  - Density: 4.65/sq mi (1.80/km^{2})
- Time zone: UTC-6 (CST)
  - Summer (DST): UTC-5 (CDT)
- ZIP codes: 62420, 62442, 62474
- FIPS code: 17-023-57667

Parker Township is one of fifteen townships in Clark County, Illinois, US. As of the 2020 census, its population was 167 and it contained 107 housing units.

== Geography ==
According to the 2021 census gazetteer files, Parker Township has a total area of 35.91 square miles (93.01 km^{2}), of which 35.87 square miles (92.90 km^{2}) (or 99.89%) is land and 0.04 square miles (0.10 km^{2}) (or 0.11%) is water.

=== Unincorporated towns ===
- Cleone

(This list is based on USGS data and may include former settlements.)

=== Major highways ===
- Interstate 70
- Illinois Route 49

== Demographics ==
As of the 2020 census there were 167 people, 132 households, and 119 families residing in the township. The population density was 4.65 inhabitants per square mile (1.80/km^{2}). There were 107 housing units at an average density of 2.98 per square mile (1.15/km^{2}). The racial makeup of the township was 98.80% White, 0.00% African American, 0.00% Native American, 0.00% Asian, 0.00% Pacific Islander, 0.00% from other races, and 1.20% from two or more races. Hispanic or Latino of any race were 1.20% of the population.

There were 132 households, out of which 41.70% had children under the age of 18 living with them, 73.48% were married couples living together, 6.82% had a female householder with no spouse present, and 9.85% were non-families. 9.80% of all households were made up of individuals, and none had someone living alone who was 65 years of age or older. The average household size was 2.61 and the average family size was 2.77.

The township's age distribution consisted of 31.3% under the age of 18, 1.2% from 18 to 24, 20.7% from 25 to 44, 40.2% from 45 to 64, and 6.4% who were 65 years of age or older. The median age was 36.0 years. For every 100 females, there were 115.6 males. For every 100 females age 18 and over, there were 132.4 males.

The median income for a household in the township was $76,316, and the median income for a family was $75,691. Males had a median income of $42,009 versus $22,500 for females. The per capita income for the township was $34,159. None of the population was below the poverty line.

Historical population
Census	Pop.	Note	%±
2010	186		—
2020	167		−10.2%
U.S. Decennial Census

== School districts ==
- Casey-Westfield Community Unit School District 4c
- Martinsville Community Unit School District 3c

== Political districts ==
- Illinois' 15th congressional district
- State House District 109
- State Senate District 55
