= Walnut Prairie, Illinois =

- Unincorporated community
- Location within Illinois Location within the United States
- Coordinates: 39°14′24″N 87°39′58″W
- Country: United States
- State: Illinois
- County: Clark
- Elevation: 482 ft (147 m)
- Time zone: UTC-6 (Central (CST))
  - Summer (DST): UTC-5 (CDT)
- Area code: 217
- GNIS feature ID: 420478

Walnut Prairie is an unincorporated community in Clark County, Illinois, United States, located along Illinois Route 1, 11 miles (18 km) south of Marshall.

Walter E. Cork (1886–1958), an Illinois state representative and businessman, was born in Walnut Prairie.
