= Robert L. Dulaney House =

Historic house in Illinois, United States

- U.S. National Register of Historic Places
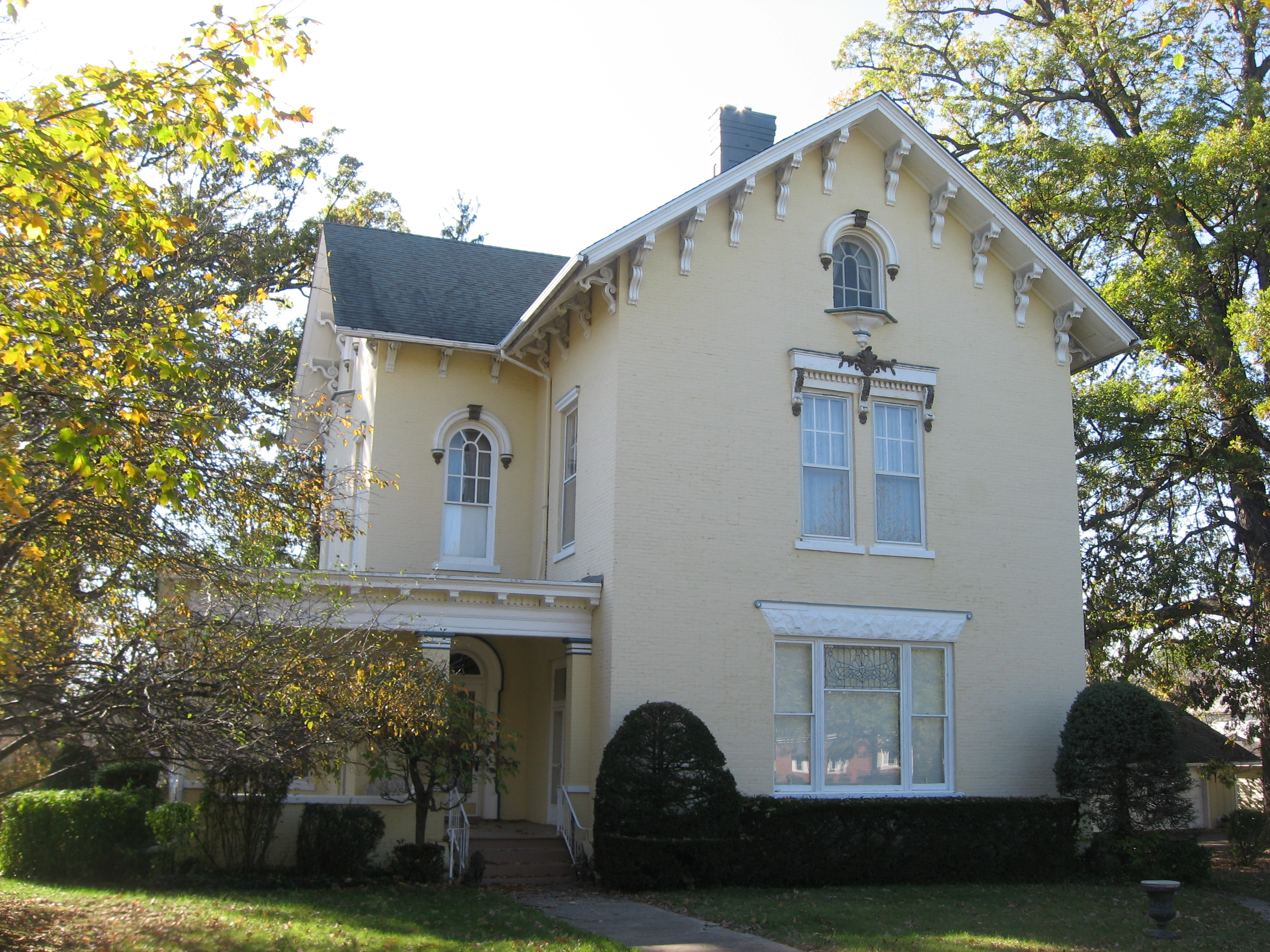

- Location within Illinois Location within the United States
- Location: 602 N. 7th Street, Marshall, Illinois
- Coordinates: 39°23′44″N 87°41′52″W
- Area: less than one acre
- Built: c. 1864
- Architectural style: Italianate
- NRHP reference No.: 97000382
- Added to NRHP: May 2, 1997

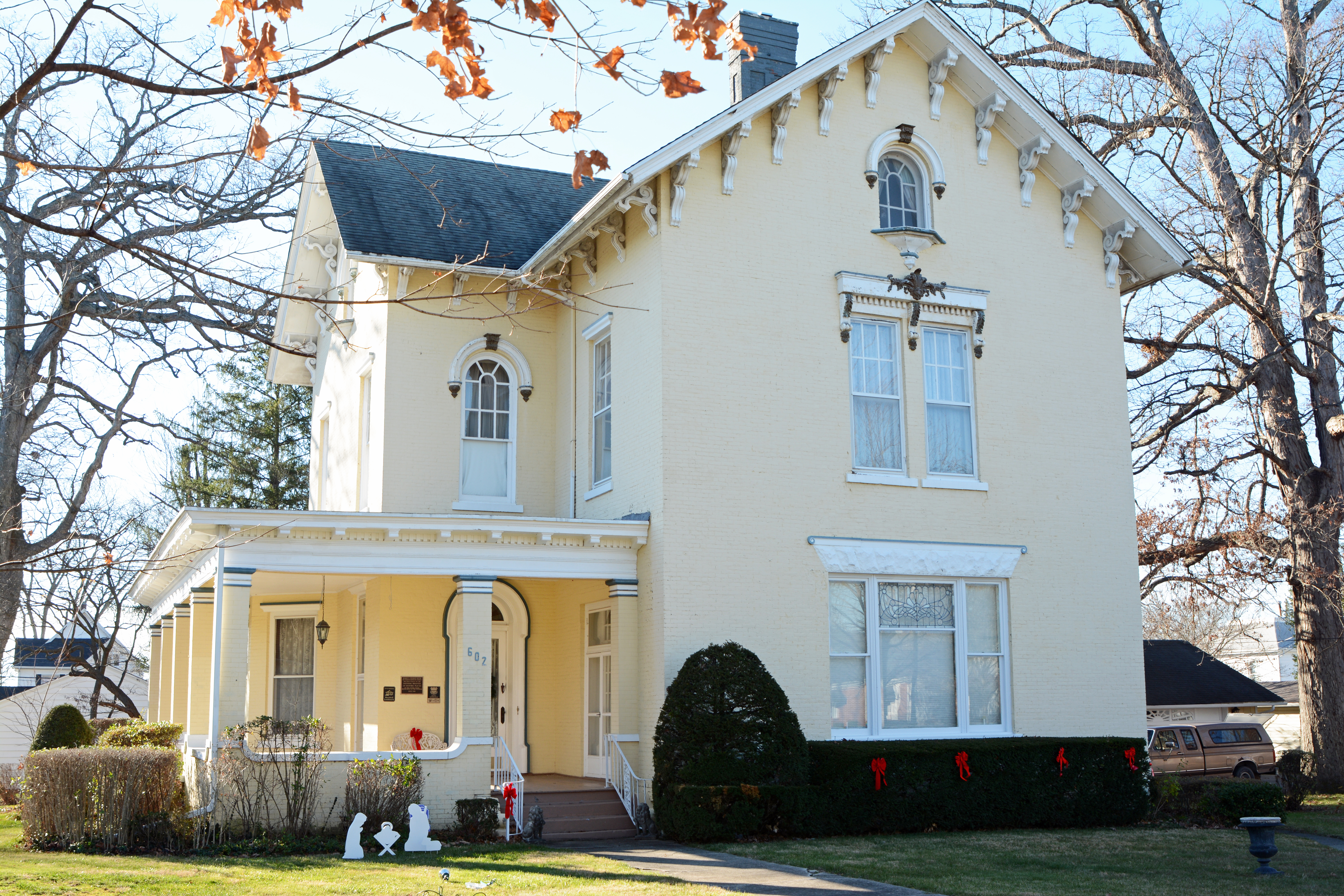
The house in 2015

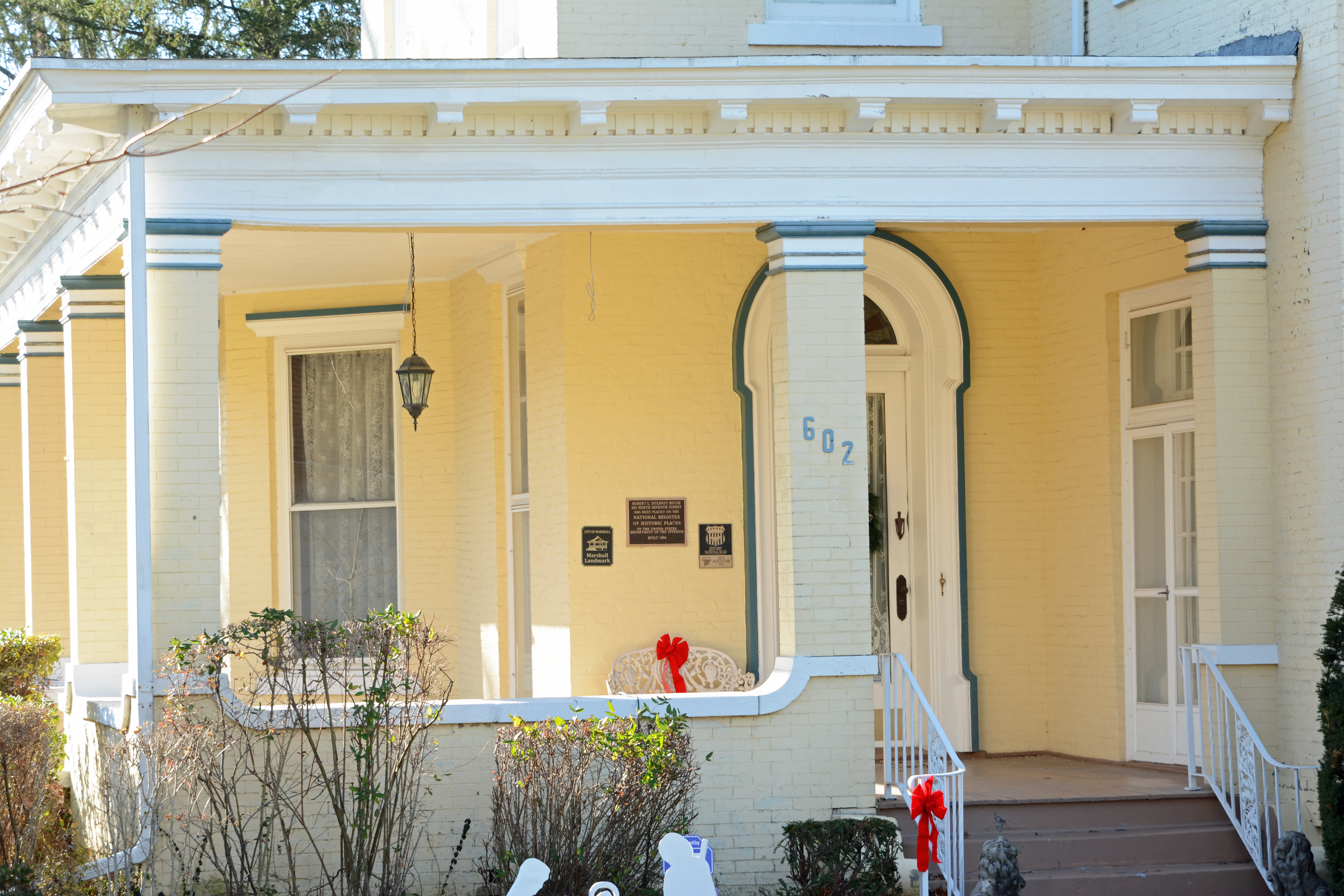
Porch details

The Robert L. Dulaney House is a historic house located at 602 North 7th Street in Marshall, Illinois.

== Description and history ==
The house was built circa 1864 for Robert L. Dulaney, a local lawyer and banker, and his family. The house has an Italianate design and is one of ten homes in Marshall designed in the style. The walls of the house were built with brick, while its foundation is limestone. The house's third-floor windows, as well as the second-floor window above the entrance, are arched and feature cast iron hoods, a unique feature among Marshall's homes. The steep cross gabled roof has wide overhanging eaves, which are decorated with brackets. In the 1890s, the house was remodeled to add Queen Anne and Classical Revival elements, such as its windows and front porch respectively.

The house was added to the National Register of Historic Places on May 2, 1997.
