= Clark County, Illinois =

County in Illinois, United States

- County
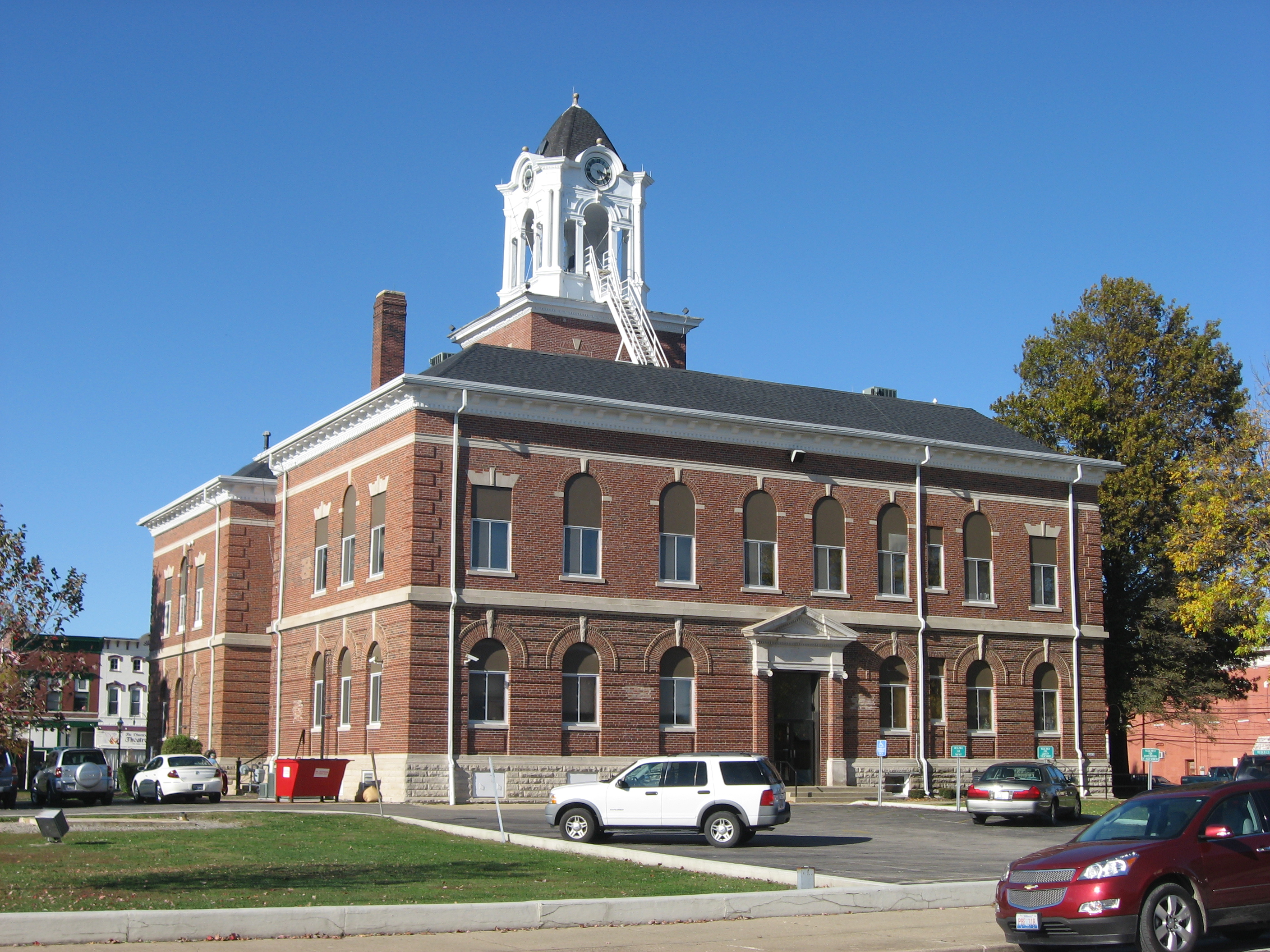
- Clark County Courthouse in Marshall

- Location within the U.S. state of Illinois
- Coordinates: 39°20′N 87°47′W
- Country: United States
- State: Illinois
- Founded: 1819
- Named for: George Rogers Clark
- Seat: Marshall
- Largest city: Marshall

Area
  - Total: 505 sq mi (1,310 km^{2})
  - Land: 501 sq mi (1,300 km^{2})
  - Water: 3.4 sq mi (8.8 km^{2}) 0.7%

Population (2020)
  - Total: 15,455
  - Estimate (2025): 15,114 ▼
  - Density: 30.8/sq mi (11.9/km^{2})
- Time zone: UTC−6 (Central)
  - Summer (DST): UTC−5 (CDT)
- Congressional district: 12th
- Website: www.clarkcountyil.org

Clark County is a county located in the southeastern part of the U.S. state of Illinois, along the Indiana state line. As of the 2020 census, the population was 15,455. Its county seat is Marshall. The county was named for George Rogers Clark, an officer who served in the American Revolution.

== History ==
Clark County was formed in 1819 out of Crawford County. At the time of its formation, Clark County included about a third of Illinois and extended as far north as the present state of Wisconsin. In 1821, the northern part of Clark County became part of the newly created Pike County on January 31, and the newly created Fayette County took the western part of Clark County on February 14. Edgar County was created from the northern part of Clark County on January 3, 1823. The creation of Coles County occupied additional land from western Clark County, effective December 25, 1830. The boundaries of Clark County have been unchanged since.

Clark County was named for George Rogers Clark (older brother of William Clark of the Lewis and Clark Expedition), an officer of the army of Virginia that captured the Northwest Territory from the British during the Revolutionary War.

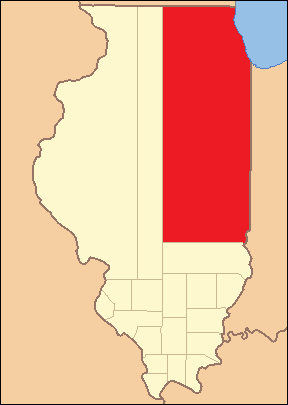
Clark County from the time of its creation to 1821

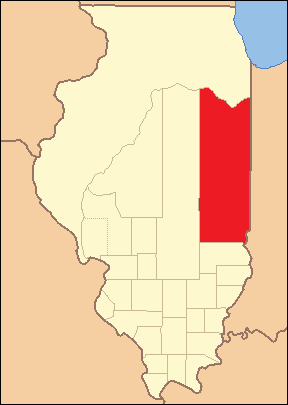
Clark between 1821 and 1823

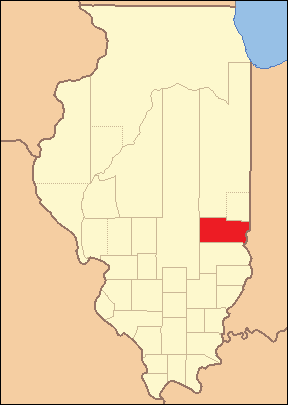
Clark between 1823 and 1830

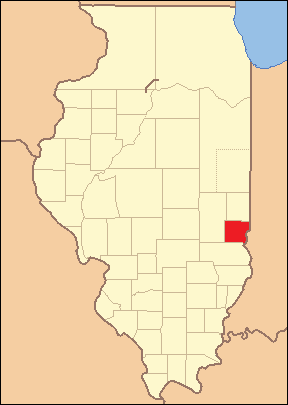
Clark reduced to its current size in 1830 by the creation of Coles County

The county seat was located in Darwin Township in 1823. A county-wide referendum was held in 1839 to determine whether Auburn or Marshall would be designated as the new seat. Marshall won the election and has remained the county seat since then.

== Geography ==
According to the U.S. Census Bureau, the county has a total area of 505 square miles (1,310 km^{2}), of which 501 square miles (1,300 km^{2}) is land and 3.4 square miles (8.8 km^{2}) (0.7%) is water. Part of the county's eastern border is defined by the Wabash River. The North Fork of the Embarras River and Hurricane Creek are the main streams in western Clark County. Other than the Wabash River, Big Creek is the major stream in the eastern part of the county.

=== Adjacent counties ===
- Edgar County - north
- Vigo County, Indiana - northeast
- Sullivan County, Indiana - southeast
- Crawford County - south
- Jasper County - southwest
- Cumberland County - west
- Coles County - northwest

=== Transit ===
- Rides Mass Transit District

=== Major highways ===
- Interstate 70
- U.S. Route 40
- Illinois Route 1
- Illinois Route 49

== Climate and weather ==
Marshall, Illinois

Climate chart (precipitation, max. and min. temperature)
J	F	M	A	M	J	J	A	S	O	N	D
2.2 34 16	2.2 40 21	3.3 51 31	4 63 41	4.3 74 51	4.2 83 61	4.4 86 65	4.4 84 62	2.9 78 55	2.8 66 43	3.7 51 33	3.1 39 22
- █ Average max. and min. temperatures in °F
- █ Precipitation totals in inches
- Source: The Weather Channel
Metric conversion
J	F	M	A	M	J	J	A	S	O	N	D
57 1 −9	57 4 −6	83 11 −1	101 17 5	109 23 11	108 28 16	113 30 18	112 29 17	75 26 13	71 19 6	93 11 1	79 4 −6
- █ Average max. and min. temperatures in °C
- █ Precipitation totals in mm

In recent years, average temperatures in the county seat of Marshall have ranged from a low of 16 °F (−9 °C) in January to a high of 86 °F (30 °C) in July, although a record low of −23 °F (−31 °C) was recorded in January 1930 and a record high of 109 °F (43 °C) was recorded in July 1936. Average monthly precipitation ranged from 2.23 inches (57 mm) in January to 4.43 inches (113 mm) in July.

== Demographics ==
Historical population
Census	Pop.	Note	%±
1820	931		—
1830	3,940		323.2%
1840	7,453		89.2%
1850	9,532		27.9%
1860	14,987		57.2%
1870	18,719		24.9%
1880	21,894		17.0%
1890	21,899		0.0%
1900	24,033		9.7%
1910	23,517		−2.1%
1920	21,165		−10.0%
1930	17,872		−15.6%
1940	18,842		5.4%
1950	17,362		−7.9%
1960	16,546		−4.7%
1970	16,216		−2.0%
1980	16,913		4.3%
1990	15,921		−5.9%
2000	17,008		6.8%
2010	16,335		−4.0%
2020	15,455		−5.4%
2025 (est.)	15,114	▼	−2.2%
U.S. Decennial Census; 1790-1960 1900-1990; 1990-2000 2010

2000 census age pyramid for Clark County

=== 2020 census ===
As of the 2020 census, the county had a population of 15,455. The median age was 43.4 years. 22.4% of residents were under the age of 18, and 20.9% of residents were 65 years of age or older. For every 100 females there were 98.3 males, and for every 100 females age 18 and over there were 96.5 males age 18 and over.

The racial makeup of the county was 95.7% White, 0.3% Black or African American, 0.2% American Indian and Alaska Native, 0.4% Asian, <0.1% Native Hawaiian and Pacific Islander, 0.6% from some other race, and 2.8% from two or more races. Hispanic or Latino residents of any race comprised 1.6% of the population.

<0.1% of residents lived in urban areas, while 100.0% lived in rural areas.

There were 6,506 households in the county, of which 27.8% had children under the age of 18 living in them. Of all households, 50.8% were married-couple households, 18.3% were households with a male householder and no spouse or partner present, and 24.0% were households with a female householder and no spouse or partner present. About 29.9% of all households were made up of individuals, and 14.6% had someone living alone who was 65 years of age or older.

There were 7,327 housing units, of which 11.2% were vacant. Among occupied housing units, 76.2% were owner-occupied, and 23.8% were renter-occupied. The homeowner vacancy rate was 2.2%, and the rental vacancy rate was 6.5%.

=== Racial and ethnic composition ===
Clark County, Illinois – Racial and ethnic composition Note: the US Census treats Hispanic/Latino as an ethnic category. This table excludes Latinos from the racial categories and assigns them to a separate category. Hispanics/Latinos may be of any race.
Race / Ethnicity (NH = Non-Hispanic)	Pop 1980	Pop 1990	Pop 2000	Pop 2010	Pop 2020	% 1980	% 1990	% 2000	% 2010	% 2020
White alone (NH)	16,820	15,808	16,766	15,925	14,680	99.45%	99.29%	98.58%	97.49%	94.99%
Black or African American alone (NH)	5	10	33	48	54	0.03%	0.06%	0.19%	0.29%	0.35%
Native American or Alaska Native alone (NH)	10	25	30	24	28	0.06%	0.16%	0.18%	0.15%	0.18%
Asian alone (NH)	11	36	22	54	52	0.07%	0.23%	0.13%	0.33%	0.34%
Native Hawaiian or Pacific Islander alone (NH)	x	x	1	3	0	x	x	0.01%	0.02%	0.00%
Other race alone (NH)	15	0	7	3	30	0.09%	0.00%	0.04%	0.02%	0.19%
Mixed race or Multiracial (NH)	x	x	95	106	365	x	x	0.56%	0.65%	2.36%
Hispanic or Latino (any race)	52	42	54	172	246	0.31%	0.26%	0.32%	1.05%	1.59%
Total	16,913	15,921	17,008	16,335	15,455	100.00%	100.00%	100.00%	100.00%	100.00%

=== 2010 census ===
As of the 2010 United States census, there were 16,335 people, 6,782 households, and 4,593 families residing in the county. The population density was 32.6 inhabitants per square mile (12.6/km^{2}). There were 7,772 housing units at an average density of 15.5 per square mile (6.0/km^{2}). The racial makeup of the county was 98.1% white, 0.3% black or African American, 0.3% Asian, 0.2% American Indian, 0.3% from other races, and 0.7% from two or more races. Those of Hispanic or Latino origin made up 1.1% of the population. In terms of ancestry, 27.4% were German, 14.2% were Irish, 14.2% were English, and 10.8% were American.

Of the 6,782 households, 30.3% had children under the age of 18 living with them, 53.5% were married couples living together, 9.7% had a female householder with no husband present, 32.3% were non-families, and 27.7% of all households were made up of individuals. The average household size was 2.38, and the average family size was 2.87. The median age was 42.3 years.

The median income for a household in the county was $43,597, and the median income for a family was $52,689. Males had a median income of $39,385 versus $27,426 for females. The per capita income for the county was $23,173. About 7.6% of families and 10.9% of the population were below the poverty line, including 15.3% of those under age 18 and 9.8% of those age 65 or over.

== Education ==
There are four school districts with territory in Clark County: Casey-Westfield Community Unit School District 4C, Marshall Community Unit School District 2C, Martinsville Community Unit School District 3C, and Hutsonville Community Unit School District 1.

They have a total enrollment (2004) of 3,014 students. Each district has one high school (grades 9–12) and one junior high school (grades 7–8). Marshall has two elementary schools, and the other districts have one each.

See List of school districts in Clark County

== Communities ==
=== Cities ===
- Casey
- Marshall (seat)
- Martinsville

=== Village ===
- Westfield

=== Census designated places ===
- West Union

=== Unincorporated communities ===
- Adenmoor
- Castle Fin
- Clark Center
- Clarksville
- Cleone
- Darwin
- Dennison
- Moonshine
- Walnut Prairie
- York

=== Townships ===
Clark County is divided into fifteen townships:

- Anderson
- Auburn
- Casey
- Darwin
- Dolson
- Douglas
- Johnson
- Marshall
- Martinsville
- Melrose
- Orange
- Parker
- Wabash
- Westfield
- York

=== Former Settlement ===
- Griffin

== Politics ==
In its early days, Clark County favored the Democratic Party, not supporting a Republican presidential candidate until Theodore Roosevelt’s 1904 landslide. Since 1920, it has been a strongly Republican county: the last Democrat to win a majority was Lyndon Johnson in 1964, and only Bill Clinton by plurality in 1992 has won the county since.

United States presidential election results for Clark County, Illinois
Year	Republican		Democratic		Third party(ies)	
Year	No.	%	No.	%	No.	%
1892	2,181	41.88%	2,244	43.09%	783	15.03%
1896	2,888	47.66%	3,103	51.20%	69	1.14%
1900	2,929	47.78%	3,009	49.09%	192	3.13%
1904	2,886	52.70%	2,271	41.47%	319	5.83%
1908	3,158	51.26%	2,793	45.33%	210	3.41%
1912	1,897	34.17%	2,517	45.34%	1,138	20.50%
1916	4,936	47.25%	5,311	50.84%	199	1.91%
1920	5,312	55.35%	4,181	43.57%	104	1.08%
1924	4,731	51.55%	4,203	45.79%	244	2.66%
1928	5,632	60.64%	3,621	38.99%	35	0.38%
1932	4,148	41.98%	5,659	57.27%	74	0.75%
1936	5,426	47.96%	5,836	51.58%	52	0.46%
1940	5,976	55.15%	4,807	44.36%	53	0.49%
1944	5,373	59.41%	3,619	40.02%	52	0.57%
1948	4,477	53.92%	3,714	44.73%	112	1.35%
1952	5,700	61.12%	3,621	38.83%	5	0.05%
1956	5,451	60.74%	3,519	39.21%	4	0.04%
1960	5,319	57.36%	3,949	42.59%	5	0.05%
1964	4,403	49.66%	4,464	50.34%	0	0.00%
1968	4,809	56.08%	2,813	32.80%	953	11.11%
1972	5,706	65.74%	2,965	34.16%	9	0.10%
1976	4,506	52.26%	4,071	47.22%	45	0.52%
1980	5,476	63.19%	2,855	32.94%	335	3.87%
1984	5,318	63.45%	3,032	36.17%	32	0.38%
1988	4,508	57.71%	3,275	41.93%	28	0.36%
1992	3,175	39.79%	3,338	41.83%	1,466	18.37%
1996	3,409	47.22%	2,995	41.48%	816	11.30%
2000	4,398	58.55%	2,932	39.03%	182	2.42%
2004	5,082	63.47%	2,877	35.93%	48	0.60%
2008	4,409	53.04%	3,742	45.02%	161	1.94%
2012	5,144	65.23%	2,591	32.86%	151	1.91%
2016	5,622	70.91%	1,877	23.68%	429	5.41%
2020	6,226	74.39%	1,993	23.81%	150	1.79%
2024	6,130	74.50%	1,927	23.42%	171	2.08%

== See also ==
- National Register of Historic Places listings in Clark County, Illinois

== Sources ==
- Perrin, William Henry, ed.. History of Crawford and Clark Counties, Illinois Chicago, Illinois. O. L. Baskin & Co. (1883).
