= Martinsville, Illinois =

Martinsville
- City
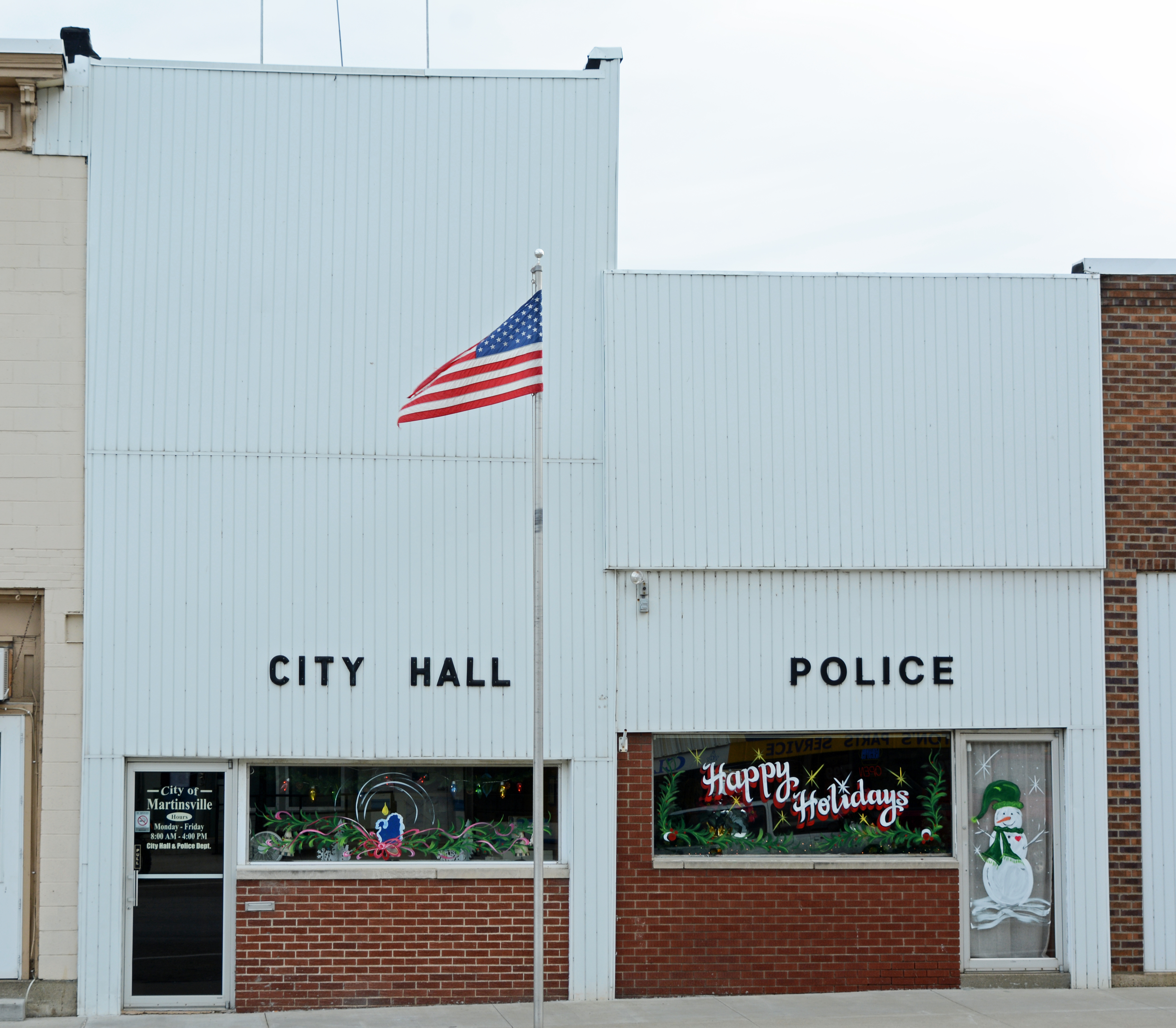
- City Hall and Police station

- Location of Martinsville in Clark County, Illinois.
- Coordinates: 39°19′47″N 87°52′32″W
- Country: United States
- State: Illinois
- County: Clark

Area
  - Total: 2.05 sq mi (5.31 km^{2})
  - Land: 2.02 sq mi (5.23 km^{2})
  - Water: 0.027 sq mi (0.07 km^{2})
- Elevation: 604 ft (184 m)

Population (2020)
  - Total: 1,118
  - Density: 553.3/sq mi (213.62/km^{2})
- Time zone: UTC-6 (CST)
  - Summer (DST): UTC-5 (CDT)
- ZIP code: 62442
- Area code: 217
- FIPS code: 17–47254
- GNIS feature ID: 2395033
- Website: martinsvilleil.com

Martinsville is a city in Clark County, Illinois, United States. The population was 1,118 at the 2020 census.

== Geography ==
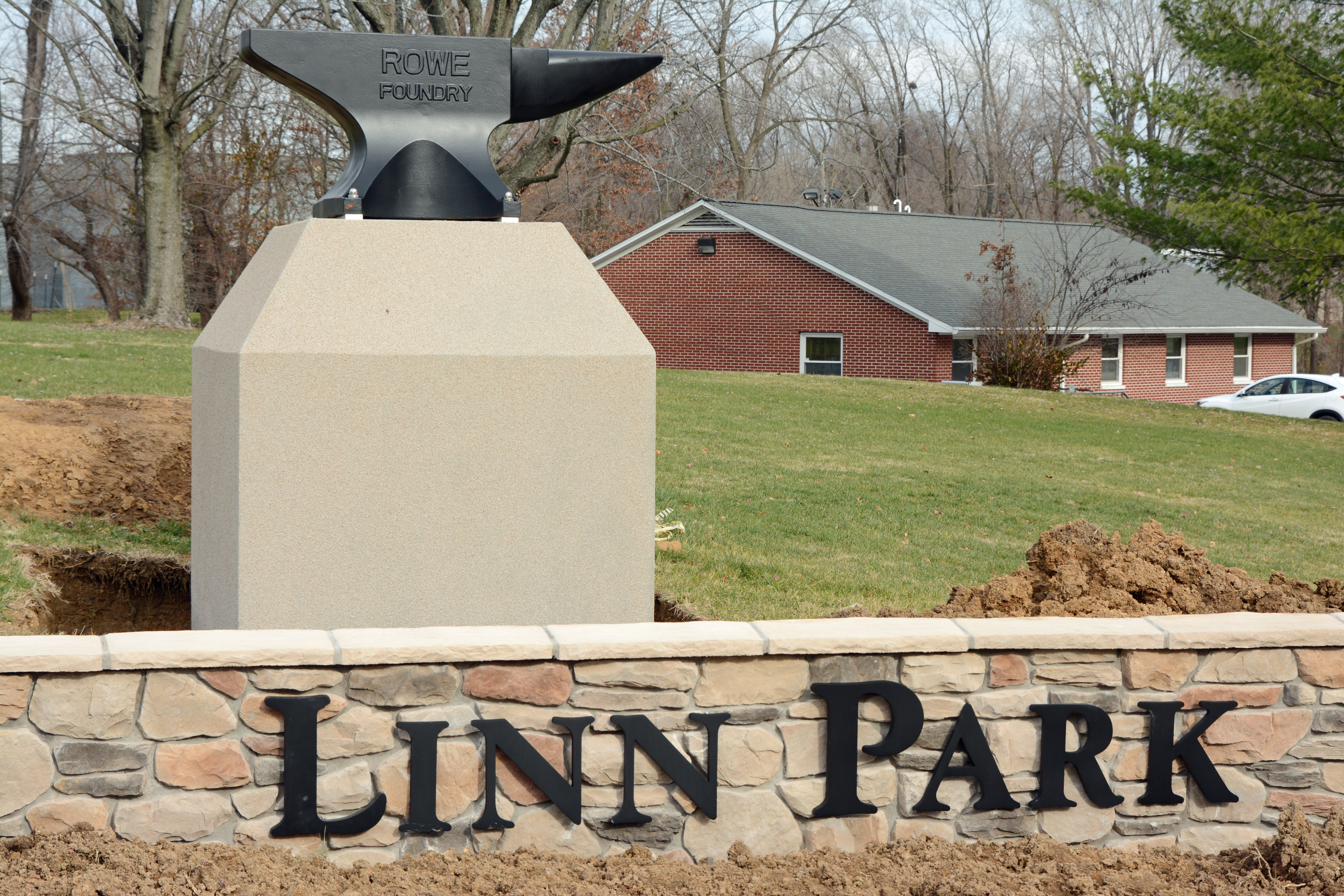
Linn Park, featuring the world's largest anvil. The Martinsville Library is in the background.

According to the 2021 census gazetteer files, Martinsville has a total area of 2.05 square miles (5.31 km^{2}), of which 2.02 square miles (5.23 km^{2}) (or 98.63%) is land and 0.03 square miles (0.08 km^{2}) (or 1.37%) is water.

== Demographics ==
Historical population
Census	Pop.	Note	%±
1880	663		—
1890	779		17.5%
1900	1,000		28.4%
1910	1,500		50.0%
1920	1,437		−4.2%
1930	1,206		−16.1%
1940	1,296		7.5%
1950	1,440		11.1%
1960	1,351		−6.2%
1970	1,374		1.7%
1980	1,298		−5.5%
1990	1,161		−10.6%
2000	1,225		5.5%
2010	1,167		−4.7%
2020	1,118		−4.2%
U.S. Decennial Census

=== 2020 census ===
As of the 2020 census, Martinsville had a population of 1,118. The median age was 38.0 years. 26.2% of residents were under the age of 18 and 16.6% of residents were 65 years of age or older. For every 100 females there were 87.6 males, and for every 100 females age 18 and over there were 85.4 males age 18 and over.

0.0% of residents lived in urban areas, while 100.0% lived in rural areas.

There were 472 households in Martinsville, of which 30.3% had children under the age of 18 living in them. Of all households, 41.5% were married-couple households, 16.5% were households with a male householder and no spouse or partner present, and 31.6% were households with a female householder and no spouse or partner present. About 32.8% of all households were made up of individuals and 18.0% had someone living alone who was 65 years of age or older.

There were 521 housing units, of which 9.4% were vacant. The homeowner vacancy rate was 1.8% and the rental vacancy rate was 8.5%. The population density was 545.63 inhabitants per square mile (210.67/km^{2}), and the housing unit density was 254.27 units per square mile (98.17 units/km^{2}).

Racial composition as of the 2020 census
Race	Number	Percent
White	1,064	95.2%
Black or African American	1	0.1%
American Indian and Alaska Native	0	0.0%
Asian	1	0.1%
Native Hawaiian and Other Pacific Islander	0	0.0%
Some other race	11	1.0%
Two or more races	41	3.7%
Hispanic or Latino (of any race)	26	2.3%

=== Income and poverty ===
The median income for a household in the city was $46,875, and the median income for a family was $56,354. Males had a median income of $33,594 versus $17,277 for females. The per capita income for the city was $20,993. About 22.6% of families and 27.5% of the population were below the poverty line, including 35.6% of those under age 18 and 7.9% of those age 65 or over.
