= Westervelt Christian Church =

Historic church in Illinois, United States

- U.S. National Register of Historic Places
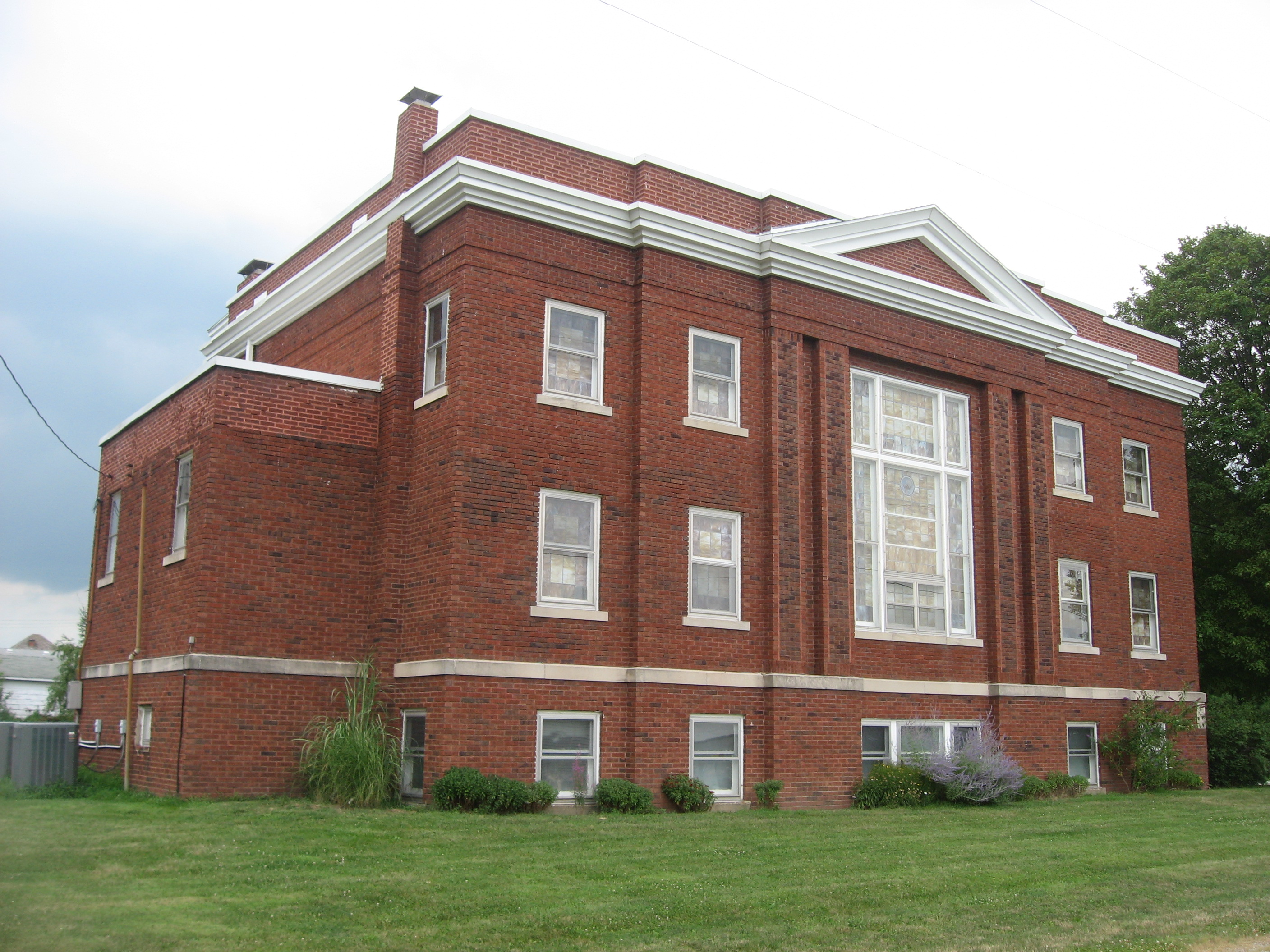
- Southern side

- Location within Illinois Location within the United States
- Location: 103 W. Main St., Westervelt, Illinois
- Coordinates: 39°28′53″N 88°51′35″W
- Area: less than one acre
- Built: 1921
- Architect: Harris, Charles
- Architectural style: Classical Revival
- NRHP reference No.: 06000009
- Added to NRHP: February 9, 2006

Westervelt Christian Church is a historic church located at 103 W. Main Street in Westervelt, Illinois. Built in 1921, the church was the second in Westervelt. Its early membership came from the Antioch Church in Brunswick, a nearby community from which most of Westervelt's residents migrated after the Chicago and Eastern Illinois Railroad opened a station in the latter community. Architect Charles Harris designed the church in the Classical Revival style. The eastern main entrance to the church features a two-story portico with a triangular pediment. The north and south sides of the church also have triangular pediments, which are supported by brick pilasters. A stone belt course encircles the building below the pediments, and a plain cornice runs below the roof line.

The church was added to the National Register of Historic Places in 2006.
