= List of unincorporated communities in Illinois =

This is a list of unincorporated communities in Illinois, arranged in alphabetical order:

== A ==
- Adair
- Adams
- Aden
- Adenmoor
- Adrian
- Afolkey
- Afton Center
- Akin
- Alden
- Alexander
- Allens Corners
- Allentown
- Alta
- Altmar 41°08′31″N 88°53′33″W
- Alworth 42°14′37″N 89°14′44″W
- America
- Ames
- Ancona
- Andres
- Andrew 39°53′44″N 89°38′24″W
- Annapolis
- Appleton
- Aptakisic
- Arcadia
- Archer 39°46′53″N 89°44′09″W
- Argo Fay
- Argyle
- Armstrong
- Arnold, Carroll County
- Arnold, Morgan County
- Atlas
- Atterberry
- Attila 37°46′11″N 88°46′16″W
- Atwater
- Augerville
- Augsburg
- Avena

== B ==
- Babylon
- Bader
- Baileyville
- Baker
- Bakerville, Jefferson County
- Bakerville, Logan County
- Balcom
- Bald Mound
- Ballou
- Barclay
- Barnes
- Barnhill
- Barr, Macoupin County
- Barr, Sangamon County
- Barrow
- Barstow
- Bates
- Batestown
- Bay City, Pope County
- Bayle City
- Bearsdale
- Beason
- Beaty
- Beaucoup
- Beaver Creek
- Beechville
- Belmont
- Bellair
- Belleview
- Belltown
- Beltrees
- Bennington
- Bentown
- Benville
- Bernadotte
- Berryville
- Berwick
- Beverly
- Bible Grove
- Big Bay
- Big Foot Prairie
- Bigneck
- Billett
- Binghampton
- Birds
- Birkbeck
- Bishop
- Bissell
- Blackhawk
- Blackstone
- Blaine
- Blair, Livingston County
- Blair, Randolph County
- Blairsville, Hamilton County
- Blairsville, Williamson County
- Blakes 41°27′31″N 88°45′10″W
- Blanding
- Bloomfield, Adams County
- Bloomfield, Johnson County
- Bloomfield, Scott County
- Bloomington Heights
- Blue Ridge
- Bluff City, Fayette County
- Bluff City, Schuyler County
- Bluff Springs
- Blyton
- Boaz
- Bobtown
- Boden
- Bogota
- Boles
- Bolivia
- Bolton
- Boody
- Boos
- Borton
- Boskydell
- Boulder
- Boulder Hill
- Bourbon
- Bowes
- Bradbury
- Bradfordton
- Breckenridge, Hancock County
- Breckenridge, Sangamon County
- Breeds
- Bremen, Randolph County
- Brereton
- Bristol
- Broadmoor
- Brooklyn, Schuyler County
- Brookville
- Brownfield
- Brownsville
- Bruce
- Bryce
- Buckhart
- Buckhorn
- Buckhorn Corners
- Bucks
- Buena Vista
- Buffalo Grove, Ogle County
- Buffalo Hart
- Buffalo Prairie
- Burgess
- Burksville
- Burksville Station
- Burnside
- Burton
- Burtons Bridge
- Burton View
- Bushton

== C ==
- Cable
- Cache
- Cadiz
- Cameron
- Camp Ground
- Camp Grove
- Camp Travis
- Campbell
- Campbell's Island
- Candlewick Lake
- Carle Springs
- Carman
- Carriers Mills
- Carthage Lake
- Castle Fin
- Castleton
- Cayuga
- Centerville, Calhoun County
- Centerville, Knox County
- Chalfin Bridge
- Chambersburg
- Chana
- Chapman
- Charter Grove
- Chatton
- Chauncey
- Chautauqua
- Checkrow
- Cheneyville
- Chestervale
- Chesterville
- Chestline
- Chicken Bristle
- Chili
- Clare
- Clarence
- Clarion
- Clark Center
- Clarksburg
- Clarksdale
- Clarksville
- Clarmin
- Claytonville
- Clear Lake, Cass County
- Cleburne
- Cleone
- Clifford
- Cloverdale
- Coal Hollow
- Coldbrook
- Coles
- Collison
- Colmar
- Columbia Heights
- Colusa
- Colvin Park
- Conant
- Confidence
- Cooks Mills
- Cooperstown
- Coral
- Corinth
- Cottage Grove
- Cottage Hills
- Cottonwood
- Covell
- Cowling
- Coyne Center
- Crain
- Crenshaw Crossing
- Cropsey
- Custer Park

== D ==
- Dahinda
- Dale
- Damascus
- Damon
- Danway
- Darmstadt
- Darwin
- Daysville
- Dayton, Henry County
- Decorra
- Deering
- Deers
- Delafield
- Delhi
- Delong
- Denmark
- Dennison
- Denver
- Depler Springs
- Derby, Ford County
- Derby, Saline County
- Dewey
- Dewmaine
- Diamond Lake
- Dillsburg
- Dimmick
- Diona
- Disco
- Diswood
- Divide
- Dixon Springs
- Doddsville
- Dogwood
- Dorans
- Dorsey
- Douglas, Knox County
- Douglas, St. Clair County
- Dow
- Dozaville
- Drake
- Dressor
- Drivers
- Dudleyville
- Duncan
- Duncan Mills
- Duncanville
- Dundas
- Dunkel
- Durham
- Durley
- Dykersburg

== E ==
- Eagle
- Eagle Lake
- Eagle Park
- East Hannibal
- East Lynn
- East Newbern
- East Paw Paw
- Edelstein
- Eden, Peoria County
- Eden, Randolph County
- Edgington
- Edwards
- Egan
- Eichorn
- Elba
- Elco
- Eldena
- Eleanor
- Eleroy
- Eliza
- Elkton
- Ellery
- Elliottstown
- Elmira
- Elmore
- Elva
- Elvira
- Elwin
- Embarrass
- Emma
- Enion
- Eola
- Epworth
- Esmond
- Etherton
- Etna
- Evarts
- Ewbanks

== F ==
- Fairdale
- Fairgrange
- Fairland
- Fall Creek
- Fancy Prairie
- Fandon
- Fargo
- Farm Ridge 41°13′30″N 88°54′47″W
- Farmingdale
- Fayville
- Fenton
- Fergestown
- Ferrin
- Fiatt
- Ficklin
- Filson
- Finneyville
- Fishhook
- Fitchmoor
- Five Points
- Flagg
- Flagg Center
- Flatville
- Fletcher
- Florence Station
- Florid
- Flowerfield
- Forest Lake
- Fort Sheridan
- Fosterburg
- Fountain Green
- Fowler
- Fox Lake Hills
- Franklinville
- Franks
- Frederick
- Fremont Center
- Friendsville
- Frisco
- Fuller
- Fullerton
- Funkhouser
- Future City

== G ==
- Gages Lake
- Gale
- Galesville
- Galt
- Ganntown
- Garden Prairie
- Garfield
- Gerald
- Gerlaw
- Giblin
- Gilchrist, Fulton County
- Gilchrist, Mercer County
- Gilead
- Gillum
- Gilmer
- Gilmore, Effingham County
- Glenarm
- Glendale
- Glenn
- Golden Eagle
- Golden Lily
- Golf Lakes
- Goodenow
- Goodwine
- Gordon
- Grantsburg
- Grass Lake
- Graymont
- Green Brier
- Green River
- Greenbush
- Greendale
- Grimsby
- Gross
- Grove City
- Groveland

== H ==
- Hagaman
- Hagarstown
- Hagener
- Haldane
- Hallidayboro
- Hallsville
- Hamlet
- Hamletsburg
- Harbor Light Bay
- Harco
- Harding
- Hardinville
- Harmony, Jefferson County
- Harmony, McHenry County
- Harness
- Harper
- Harrison, Winnebago County
- Harrisonville
- Hartland
- Hayes
- Hazel Dell
- Hazelhurst
- Heartville
- Heathsville
- Hegeler, Vermillion County
- Helmar
- Heman
- Henderson Grove
- Henton
- Herald
- Herbert
- Hermon
- Herod
- Hersman
- Hervey City
- Hewittsville
- Hicks
- Hillerman
- Hillery
- Holcomb
- Holder
- Homberg
- Honey Bend
- Hookdale
- Hoosier
- Hopper
- Hord
- Howardton
- Hubly
- Hugo
- Humm Wye
- Hunt City
- Hunter
- Huntsville
- Hutton

== I ==
- Illiana
- Illinois City
- Imbs
- Ingleside
- Ingraham
- Irene
- Isabel
- Island Grove, Jasper County
- Island Grove, Sangamon County
- Ivanhoe

== J ==
- Jacob
- Jamaica
- Jamesburg
- Jamestown
- Janesville
- Jaques
- Jenkins
- Johnstown
- Jonesville
- Joslin
- Jules

== K ==
- Karbers Ridge
- Kasbeer
- Kaufman
- Kedron
- Keeneyville
- Kellerville
- Kemp
- Kemper
- Kennedy
- Kent
- Kernan
- Kibbie
- Kickapoo
- Kingdom
- Kings, Ogle County
- Kingston, Adams County
- Kirksville
- Klondike
- Kritesville

== L ==
- L'Erable
- La Clede
- La Crosse
- La Fox
- La Grange, Brown County
- La Grange Highlands
- La Hogue
- La Place
- La Prairie Center
- Lake City
- Lake Fork
- Lake of the Woods, Peoria County
- Lakeview
- Lakewood, DuPage County
- Lakewood, Mason County
- Lakewood, Shelby County
- Lamb
- Lancaster
- Landes
- Lane
- Larchland
- Latham Park
- Laura
- Lawn Ridge
- Lawrence
- Leanderville
- Ledford
- Lee Center
- Leeds
- Leesburg
- Leverett
- Lewisburg
- Liberty, Saline County
- Liberty Hill
- Lillyville
- Limerick
- Lindenwood
- Literberry
- Little America
- Little Indian
- Little Rock
- Lively Grove
- Lodge
- Logan, Edgar County
- Lombardville
- Lone Tree
- Lone Tree Corners
- Long Lake
- Loogootee
- Loon Lake
- Lorenzo
- Lotus
- Loves Corner
- Low Point
- Lowder
- Lowell
- Loxa
- Loyd
- Lumaghi Heights
- Lynn Center
- Lyttleville

== M ==
- Madonnaville
- Magnet
- Manley
- Mannon
- Manville
- Maple Grove
- Maple Point
- Maples Mill
- Marblehead
- Marbletown
- Marcelline
- Marcus
- Marquette
- Marshall Landing
- Marston
- Marydale
- Massbach
- Matanzas Beach
- Maud
- Mayberry
- Mayview
- Mazonia
- McCall
- McClusky
- McConnell
- McCormick
- McDowell
- McGirr
- McKeen
- McVey
- Meadows
- Medinah
- Menard
- Meppen
- Meriden
- Merna
- Merrimac
- Merritt
- Meyer
- Michael
- Middlegrove
- Midland City
- Midway, Madison County
- Midway, Tazewell County
- Midway, Vermilion County
- Milla 41°08′29″N 88°59′00″W
- Millburn
- Miller City
- Millersburg
- Millersville
- Milmine
- Milo
- Mira
- Mitchellsville
- Mode
- Modena
- Modoc
- Monaville
- Monroe City
- Monterey
- Moonshine
- Mooseheart
- Morea
- Moro
- Morrelville
- Mossville
- Mount Carbon
- Mount Fulcher
- Mount Palatine
- Mountjoy
- Mozier
- Mozier Landing
- Murdock

== N ==
- Nachusa
- National City
- Neal
- Nekoma
- Nettle Creek
- Neunert
- Nevins
- New City
- New Delhi
- New Hanover
- New Hebron
- New Hope
- New Lebanon
- New Liberty
- New Memphis
- New Memphis Station
- New Salem
- Newbern
- Newmansville
- Newtown
- Niota
- No. 9
- Normandy
- North Dupo
- North Glen Ellyn
- North Harbor
- North Quincy
- Northville 41°33′48″N 88°42′19″W
- Norway
- Nottingham Woods
- Nutwood

== O ==
- Oakley
- Ocoya
- Odgen
- Oil Center
- Oil Grove
- Old Princeton
- Old Salem Chautauqua
- Old Stonington
- Olena
- Oneco
- Ophiem
- Oraville
- Ormonde
- Osbernville
- Osco
- Oskaloosa
- Ospur
- Ottville
- Oxville
- Ozark

== P ==
- Padua
- Paineville
- Palm Beach
- Palmerton
- Paloma
- Pankeyville
- Panorama Hills
- Paradise
- Parkland
- Parkville
- Parrish
- Passport
- Patterson Springs
- Pattonsburg
- Paulton
- Paynes Point
- Paytonville
- Perks
- Peters Creek
- Peterstown
- Petersville
- Petrolia
- Philadelphia
- Piasa
- Pierceburg
- Pierson
- Pike
- Pinkstaff
- Piopolis
- Pisgah
- Pittsburg, Fayette County
- Pittwood
- Plainview
- Plato Center
- Pleasant Grove
- Pleasant Mound
- Plum Hill
- Plumfield
- Pomona
- Ponemah
- Port Jackson
- Porterville
- Posey
- Poverty Ridge
- Prairie
- Prairie Center
- Prairie View, Lake County
- Prairietown
- Preemption
- Providence
- Pulleys Mill
- Putnam
- Pyramid

== R ==
- Raddle
- Rapatee
- Rardin
- Red Oak
- Reeds Station
- Reevesville
- Renault
- Rend City
- Reno
- Reynoldsburg
- Reynoldsville
- Richfield
- Richwoods
- Riddle Hill
- Riddleville
- Ridgefield
- Riffle
- Riggston
- Riley
- Rinard
- Rising Sun, Pope County
- Rising Sun, White County
- Ritchie
- Roby
- Rochester, Wabash County
- Rock Creek, Hardin County
- Rock Grove
- Rockport
- Rollo
- Rondout
- Rosamond
- Rosecrans
- Roslyn
- Rudement
- Russell
- Russellville, Boone County

== S ==
- Sabina
- Saint George
- Saint James
- St. Joe
- Saline Landing
- Salisbury
- Samsville
- Sandusky
- Saratoga Center
- Schaeferville
- Schapville
- Scheller
- Schuline
- Scioto Mills
- Scottland
- Seehorn
- Sellers
- Sepo
- Serena
- Seward
- Shabbona Grove
- Shady Grove
- Shale City
- Shanghai City
- Sharpsburg
- Shattuc
- Sheldons Grove
- Shetlerville
- Shiloh Hill
- Shirland
- Shirley
- Shobonier
- Shokokon
- Sicily
- Signal Hill
- Siloam
- Smithshire
- Smithville
- Sollitt
- Solomon
- Solon Mills
- Somerset
- South Addison
- South Elmhurst
- Sparks Hill
- Speer
- Spencer Heights
- Spring Valley, Adams County
- Star City
- Stark
- State Park Place
- State Road
- Stavanger
- Steel City
- Stelle
- Stillwell
- Stiritz
- Stockland
- Stone Church
- Stratford
- Straut
- Stubblefield
- Sugar Grove, Schuyler County
- Sugar Island
- Sulphur Springs
- Summer Hill
- Summum
- Sunbeam
- SunfieldSunnyland
- Sunnyside
- Sutter, Hancock County
- Sutter, Tazewell County
- Swan Creek
- Swanwick
- Swedona
- Sweet Water
- Sylvan Lake

== T ==
- Tamalco
- Taylor Ridge
- Terre Haute
- Texas City
- Texico
- The Burg
- Thomas
- Ticona 41°13′27″N 89°03′09″W
- Timothy
- Tioga
- Tipton, Champaign County
- Tipton, Monroe County
- Todds Mill
- Tomlinson
- Tonti
- Toronto
- Trenton Corners
- Trilla
- Trimble
- Triumph
- Trivoli
- Tunnel Hill
- Twelvemile Corner

== U ==
- Union, Logan County
- Union Center
- Unionville, Massac County
- Unionville, Vermilion County
- Unionville, Whiteside County
- Unity
- Urbandale

== V ==
- Valier Patch
- Valley View
- Van Burensburg
- Van Orin
- Vanderville
- Vera
- Vevay Park
- Villa Ridge

== W ==
- Wabash Point
- Wacker
- Waddams Grove
- Wakefield
- Walla Walla
- Walnut Grove, Putnam County
- Walnut Prairie
- Walsh
- Waltham
- Wanlock
- Ware
- Wartburg
- Wasson
- Wauponsee
- Webster
- Webster Park
- Wedron
- Welge
- Welland
- Wendelin
- West End
- West Liberty
- West Rural Hill
- West Vienna
- Weston, McLean County
- Wetaug
- White Rock
- Whitefield
- Whittington
- Wilbern
- Wilbur Heights
- Wildwood
- Wilkinson
- Willard
- Willey Station
- Willow
- Wilsman 41°10′16″N 88°55′55″W
- Wilton
- Wilton Center
- Wine Hill
- Winkel
- Winkle
- Winneberger
- Winneshiek
- Wisetown
- Woburn
- Wolf Lake
- Womac
- Woodbine
- Woodburn
- Woodbury
- Woodford
- Woodville
- Woodyard
- Woosung
- Wrights
- Wynoose

== Y ==
- Yellow Creek
- Yeoward Addition
- York
- York Center
- Yorktown
- Youngstown
- Yuton

== Z ==
- Zanesville
- Zearing
- Zenith 38°32′55″N 88°37′21″W
- Zenobia

== See also ==
- Administrative divisions of Illinois
- List of census-designated places in Illinois
- List of cities in Illinois
- List of Illinois townships
- List of towns and villages in Illinois
- List of counties in Illinois
- List of precincts in Illinois
