= Eagle Creek Township =

Eagle Creek Township may refer to the following townships in the United States:

- Eagle Creek Township, Gallatin County, Illinois
- Eagle Creek Township, Lake County, Indiana
