= Island Grove, Illinois =

Island Grove, Illinois may refer to:

- Island Grove, Jasper County, Illinois
- Island Grove, Sangamon County, Illinois
- Island Grove Township, Sangamon County, Illinois
