= Kumler, Illinois =

- Ghost town
- Location of Kumler within Illinois Kumler (the United States)
- Coordinates: 40°17′59″N 88°34′41″W
- Country: United States
- State: Illinois
- County: McLean
- Elevation: 735 ft (224 m)

Population (2000)
  - Total: 0
- Time zone: UTC-6 (CST)
  - Summer (DST): UTC-5 (CDT)

Kumler is a ghost town in West Township, McLean County, Illinois, United States.
