= BLOL =

BLOL may refer to:

- Bloomer Shippers Connecting Railroad, a freight railroad in Illinois
- BLOL, a fan revival of the cancelled MMO video game Borderlands Online
