= Tipton, Illinois =

Tipton, Illinois may refer to:

- Tipton, Champaign County, Illinois, an unincorporated community in Champaign County
- Tipton, Monroe County, Illinois, an unincorporated community in Monroe County
