= Manville =

Manville may refer to:

== People ==
- David Manville (born 1934), English cricketer
- Dick Manville (1926–2019), baseball pitcher
- Edward Manville (1862–1933), electrical engineer, industrialist and politician
- Françoise Eléonore Dejean de Manville (1749–1827), Countess of Sabran
- Helen Adelia Manville (1839–1912), American poet and litterateur
- Lesley Manville (born 1956), English actress
- Manville S. Hodgson (1843–?), politician
- Mikey Manville (born 1980), musician and lyricist
- Tommy Manville (1894–1967), Manhattan socialite

== Places in the United States ==
- Manville, Illinois
- Manville, Indiana
- Manville, New Jersey
- Manville, Rhode Island
- Manville, South Carolina
- Manville, Wyoming

== Other ==
- Johns Manville, building products company
- Manville gun

== See also ==
- Mannville (disambiguation)
- Maneval
