= Eppard =

Eppard may refer to:

- 21484 Eppard, a main-belt asteroid, named after ISEF awardee Erin F. Eppard
- Jim Eppard (born 1960), an American baseball player
- Joey Eppard (born 1976), an American musician
- Josh Eppard (born 1979), an American musician

== See also ==
- Eppards Point Township, located in Livingston County, Illinois, United States
