= Sutter, Illinois =

Sutter, Illinois may refer to:

- Sutter, Hancock County, Illinois, an unincorporated community in Hancock County
- Sutter, Tazewell County, Illinois, an unincorporated community in Tazewell County
