= Stearns–Wadsworth House =

Historic house in Illinois, United States

- U.S. National Register of Historic Places
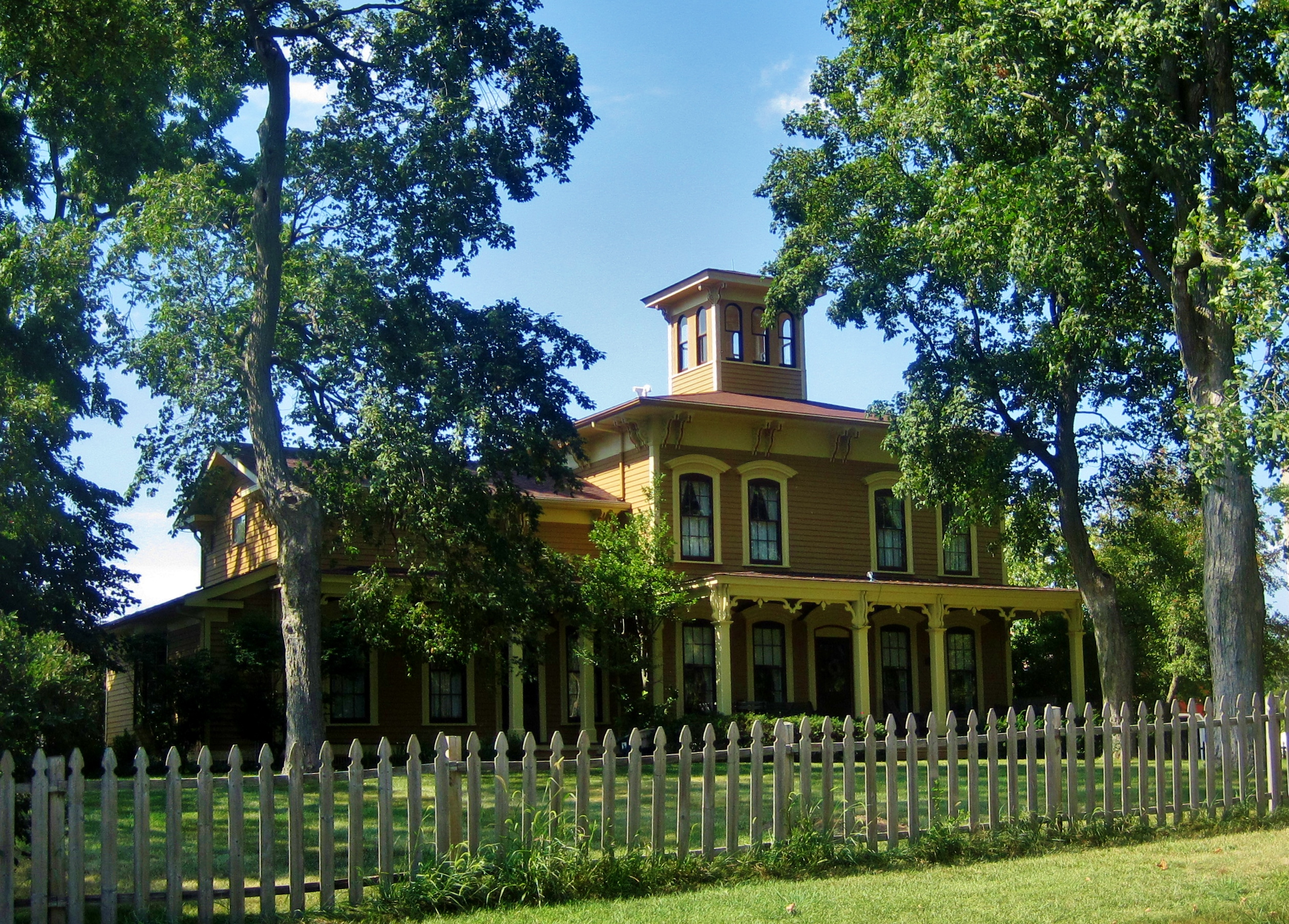
- Stearns–Wadsworth House in 2013

- Location within Illinois Location within the United States
- Location: 1 S. 570 Bliss Rd. Blackberry Township, Kane County, Illinois, United States
- Coordinates: 41°50′40″N 88°24′26″W
- Built: 1868
- Architectural style: Italianate
- NRHP reference No.: 82002547
- Added to NRHP: March 19, 1982

The Stearns–Wadsworth House is a historic Italianate residence in Bald Mound, Blackberry Township, an unincorporated settlement near Batavia, Illinois. It was built in 1868 for George N. Stearns, a farmer who owned the most land in the township. The house was added to the National Register of Historic Places in 1982.

== History ==
George N. Stearns was born in New York in 1829 and moved to Kane County, Illinois in 1844. Stearns lived in a Batavia hotel for the few years until he had accumulated enough money to purchase a farm. He made this purchase from his parents in 1858. Stearns gradually increased the size of his property, becoming the largest landholder in Blackberry Township in 1868. He decided to build a new house for his large holdings later that year. The surrounding area became known as Bald Mound and featured a post office and schoolhouse.

George Stearns died in 1870 and his property was transferred to his widow, Electa M. Stearns. The property remained in family hands until purchased by Edgar D. Wadsworth in 1885. Wadsworth used the property as a creamery. The creamery was converted into a grist mill in 1903, and the house was also used for church services. Wadsworth sold the farm to Andrew Anderson in 1920, whose family used it as a creamery and grain farm. It was then sold to the Alexander family in 1977. The house was added to the National Register of Historic Places on March 19, 1982, as an example of a 19th-century residence of a "town that never happened

The two-story wood-frame house is in the Italianate style. The north end originally featured a belvedere, but this was removed in 1920. Windows on the north and east ends of the house feature pediments. The main door and its transom are original. The Italianate porches were removed in 1962 and replaced with smaller porches, but a replica was installed in the 1980s. The interior is largely intact. Changes to the interior include modern plumbing, two additional bathrooms on the second floor, and a renovated kitchen.
