= Sabina, Illinois =

- Unincorporated community
- Location within Illinois Location within the United States
- Coordinates: 40°20′50″N 88°39′02″W
- Country: United States
- State: Illinois
- County: McLean
- Elevation: 778 ft (237 m)
- Time zone: UTC-6 (Central (CST))
  - Summer (DST): UTC-5 (CDT)
- Area code: 309
- GNIS feature ID: 417088

Sabina, also earlier known as Monarch, is an unincorporated community in West Township, McLean County, Illinois, United States.

== History ==
Sabina was established in 1878 on the Havana Rantoul & Eastern Railroad "Punkin’ Vine" narrow-gauge railway. Sabina was named for Mrs. Sabina Moore. She and her husband, Joseph G. Moore, were instrumental in the creation of the town. At one time Sabina had a hotel, church, two grain elevators, a general store and several homes. A post office was located in the hotel lobby. Unfortunately, there were several other similarly named towns and in 1881 the post office was named Monarch. In the late 19th century Sabina was often referred to by the name of its post office, Monarch.
