= Mosquito Township, Christian County, Illinois =

Mosquito Township
- Township
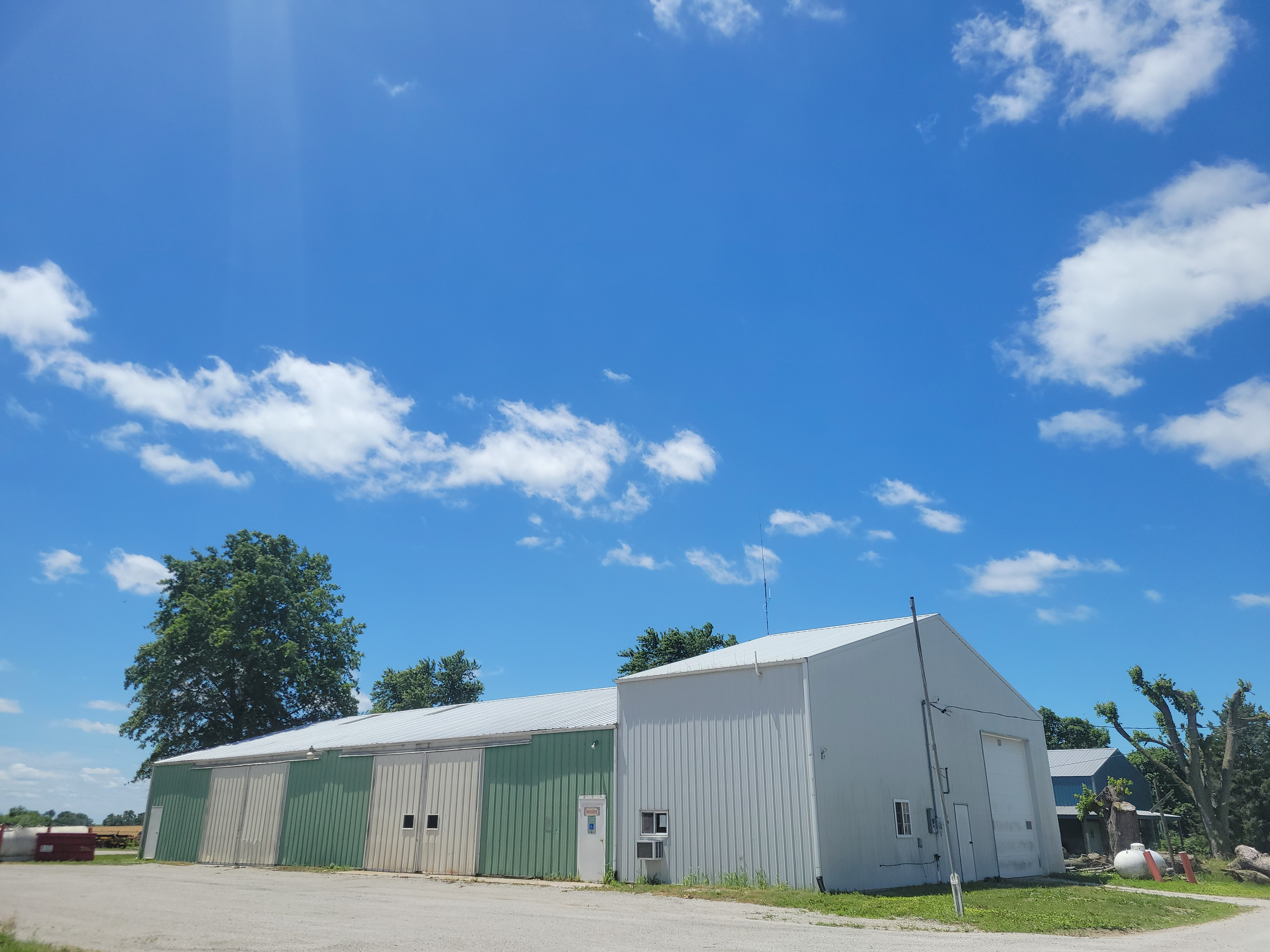
- Township building in Osbernville

- Location in Christian County

- Christian County's location in Illinois
- Coordinates: 39°45′20″N 89°11′45″W
- Country: United States
- State: Illinois
- County: Christian
- Established: November 7, 1865

Area
  - Total: 46.66 sq mi (120.8 km^{2})
  - Land: 46.65 sq mi (120.8 km^{2})
  - Water: 0 sq mi (0 km^{2}) 0%
- Elevation: 594 ft (181 m)

Population (2020)
  - Total: 346
  - Density: 7.42/sq mi (2.86/km^{2})
- Time zone: UTC-6 (CST)
  - Summer (DST): UTC-5 (CDT)
- ZIP codes: 62513, 62547
- FIPS code: 17-021-50686

Mosquito Township is one of seventeen townships in Christian County, Illinois, USA. As of the 2020 census, its population was 346 and it contained 160 housing units.

== History ==
Mosquito Township takes its name from Mosquito Creek, a tributary of the Sangamon River that drains the township. Before Christian County adopted township organization in the 1860s, this area was part of Mount Auburn Precinct.

== Geography ==
According to the 2010 census, the township has a total area of 46.66 square miles (120.8 km^{2}), all land.

=== Unincorporated towns ===
- Osbernville at 39.761152°N 89.178691°W

=== Cemeteries ===
The township contains these four cemeteries: Berea Christian, Darmer, Hunter and Stafford.

=== Airports and landing strips ===
- McCoy Airport
- Noland RLA Airport

== Demographics ==
Historical population
Census	Pop.	Note	%±
1870	1,270		—
1880	1,551		22.1%
1890	1,377		−11.2%
1900	1,175		−14.7%
1910	1,134		−3.5%
1920	1,001		−11.7%
1930	926		−7.5%
1940	853		−7.9%
1950	747		−12.4%
1960	657		−12.0%
1970	534		−18.7%
1980	434		−18.7%
1990	420		−3.2%
2000	362		−13.8%
2010	390		7.7%
2020	346		−11.3%
U.S. Decennial Census

As of the 2020 census there were 346 people, 81 households, and 64 families residing in the township. The population density was 7.40 inhabitants per square mile (2.86/km^{2}). There were 160 housing units at an average density of 3.42 per square mile (1.32/km^{2}). The racial makeup of the township was 92.20% White, 0.00% African American, 0.29% Native American, 0.29% Asian, 0.00% Pacific Islander, 1.16% from other races, and 6.07% from two or more races. Hispanic or Latino of any race were 4.34% of the population.

There were 81 households, out of which 38.30% had children under the age of 18 living with them, 79.01% were married couples living together, none had a female householder with no spouse present, and 20.99% were non-families. 21.00% of all households were made up of individuals, and 11.10% had someone living alone who was 65 years of age or older. The average household size was 2.23 and the average family size was 2.56.

The township's age distribution consisted of 19.9% under the age of 18, none from 18 to 24, 33.1% from 25 to 44, 23.2% from 45 to 64, and 23.8% who were 65 years of age or older. The median age was 44.2 years. For every 100 females, there were 96.7 males. For every 100 females age 18 and over, there were 74.7 males.

The median income for a household in the township was $69,028, and the median income for a family was $73,889. Males had a median income of $67,955 versus $23,684 for females. The per capita income for the township was $30,259. None of the population was below the poverty line.

== School districts ==
- Meridian Community Unit School District 15
- Sangamon Valley Community Unit School District 9
- Taylorville Community Unit School District 3

== Political districts ==
- State House District 87
- State Senate District 44
