= McDowell, Illinois =

Coordinates: 40°49′50″N 88°35′06″W

McDowell is an unincorporated community in Eppards Point Township in Livingston County, Illinois, surrounding the intersection of 1800 East and 1400 North.

== History ==
McDowell was platted in 1872 when the Chicago and Paducah Railroad, later the Wabash and then Norfolk Western, built a line through the area. The hamlet was founded by and named after Judge Woodford G. McDowell. A post office was built the same year. The peak population was 150 in 1878. By then McDowell was home to two stores and blacksmiths. 1898 welcomed the addition of a Methodist Church and a grain elevator to the town. Prairie Central Co-op bought the elevator in 1975 and replaced it with a grain leg and two cement grain bins in 1976 for $144,589. The original church still exists today. Only one other structure exists from the hey day of the village, that being a lone shed. Three houses surround McDowell and Beck's Hybrids has a seed plant located across from where the elevator stood. In late 2020, the only visible marker of the hamlet, the grain elevator, was demolished. Currently the residences are served by the Pontiac post office.

== Location ==
McDowell is located in Eppards Point Township in the south-central part of Livingston County. 1800 Rd. East and 1400 Rd. North intersect in the middle of what remains of the settlement.

== Climate ==
The average annual precipitation in McDowell is 2.8 inches (7.1 cm). The average high and low temperatures are 51.56 °F (10.87 °C) and 41.52 °F (5.29 °C), respectively.
