= Rock Island Southern Railway =

Former interurban railway in Illinois

The Rock Island Southern Railway, or RIS, was one of the most unusual interurban systems in the United States. It consisted of two distinct divisions, each with its own unique operating parameters. It provided passenger service to the western Illinois cities of Rock Island, Monmouth and Galesburg for two decades, with freight service surviving into the 1950s on the barest remnants of a once-impressive system.

== Eastern Division ==
The older of the two RIS divisions was the line from Monmouth east to Galesburg, which was called Western Illinois Traction prior to completion of the line. By the time this 19-mile (31 km) segment was put into service in May 1906 it had become part of the RIS. This division operated on 600 volts DC electric power and used typical interurban standards, with tighter curves and narrower rolling stock than in use on mainline railroads. Passenger service was operated for two decades, ceasing in 1926 following a decline in ridership brought on by increased automobile use. Freight service continued to be provided by an assortment of electric locomotives and box motors, but during and after World War II even freight traffic declined precipitously. All service over this division was abandoned on March 30, 1951.

Stations along the line included:

- Monmouth
- Brick City
- Cameron
- Galesburg

== Northern Division ==
The better known of the two RIS divisions was the line from Monmouth north to Rock Island, which took several years to build and was completed in late 1910. Unlike the line to Galesburg, this division was built to mainline railroad standards. The long cuts, fills and high trestles that the line used to traverse the hilly Mississippi Valley country south of Rock Island were notable features of this division. Freight was hauled by steam locomotives but the line was also electrified using a single-phase 6,600 volt AC system which was unusual among interurban lines. Large interurban cars bought secondhand from the Washington Baltimore and Annapolis were used. The line leased Chicago, Rock Island and Pacific tracks from downtown Rock Island to Southern Junction and from Milan to Sherrard; in addition to the main line there were branches to Aledo and Alexis. With the abandonment of passenger service in 1926 the northern division was de-electrified, but freight service continued. In 1929 a trestle near Burgess burned, breaking the line in two, and over the following two decades the line gradually shrank back towards Rock Island as trestles rotted away and collapsed. This slow death culminated in the last run of a RIS steam engine in Rock Island in February 1952.

Stations along the line included:

- Rock Island
- Milan
- Taylor Ridge
- Reynolds
- Preemption (branch line leading to Sherrard and Cable)
- Matherville
- Gilchrist
- Aledo (branch line also leading to Shale City)
- Burgess
- Norwood
- Oil City
- Monmouth
