= Coral Township, Illinois =

Coordinates: 42°11′53″N 88°32′10″W

Coral Township
- Township
- Location in McHenry County
- Country: United States
- State: Illinois
- County: McHenry
- Established: November 6, 1849

Area
  - Total: 35.98 sq mi (93.2 km^{2})
  - Land: 35.95 sq mi (93.1 km^{2})
  - Water: 0.03 sq mi (0.078 km^{2}) 0.08%

Population (2020)
  - Total: 3,638
  - Density: 98.8/sq mi (38.1/km^{2})
- Time zone: UTC-6 (CST)
  - Summer (DST): UTC-5 (CDT)
- FIPS code: 17-111-16314
- Website: www.coraltownship.com

Coral Township is located in McHenry County, Illinois. As of the 2020 census, its population was 3,638 and it contained 1,380 housing units. It includes the census-designated places of Coral and Harmony.

== Geography ==
According to the 2010 census, the township has a total area of 35.98 square miles (93.2 km^{2}), of which 35.95 square miles (93.1 km^{2}) (or 99.92%) is land and 0.03 square miles (0.078 km^{2}) (or 0.08%) is water.

== Demographics ==
Historical population
Census	Pop.	Note	%±
2010	3,552		—
2020	3,638		2.4%
U.S. Decennial Census
