= McLean County, Illinois =

County in Illinois, United States

- County
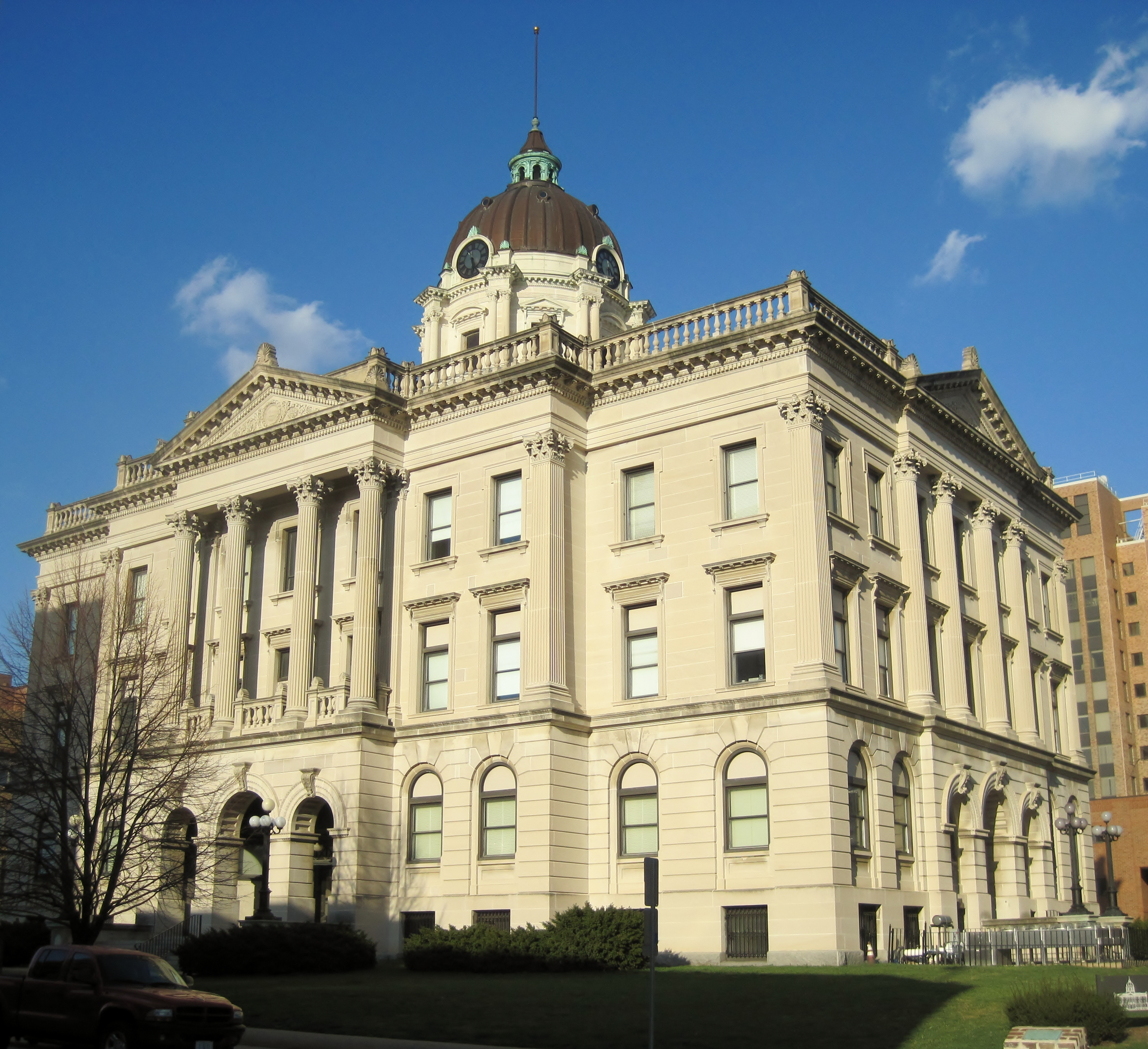
- Old McLean County Courthouse

- Location within the U.S. state of Illinois
- Coordinates: 40°29′N 88°51′W
- Country: United States
- State: Illinois
- Founded: December 25, 1830
- Named for: John McLean
- Seat: Bloomington
- Largest city: Bloomington

Area
  - Total: 1,186 sq mi (3,070 km^{2})
  - Land: 1,183 sq mi (3,060 km^{2})
  - Water: 2.9 sq mi (7.5 km^{2}) 0.2%

Population (2020)
  - Total: 170,954
  - Estimate (2025): 171,419 ▲
  - Density: 144.5/sq mi (55.80/km^{2})
- Time zone: UTC−6 (Central)
  - Summer (DST): UTC−5 (CDT)
- Congressional districts: 16th, 17th
- Website: www.mcleancountyil.gov

McLean County is a U.S. county in the east central region of Illinois, and is the largest county by land area in the state. According to the 2020 census, it had a population of 170,954. Its county seat is Bloomington. McLean County is included in the Bloomington–Normal, IL Metropolitan Statistical Area.

== Pronunciation ==
Locally, the second syllable of McLean is pronounced with a 'long a' (ā, IPA /ei/) sound (i.e. “muh-KLAIN") (as with native son McLean Stevenson), not a 'long e' (ē, IPA /i/) sound (“muh-KLEEN").

== History ==
The first white settlers in what became McLean County arrived around 1821. The first settlement was Blooming Grove, established in 1822 near present-day Bloomington. McLean County was formed on December 25, 1830, out of Tazewell County. It was named for John McLean, United States Senator for Illinois, who died in 1830.

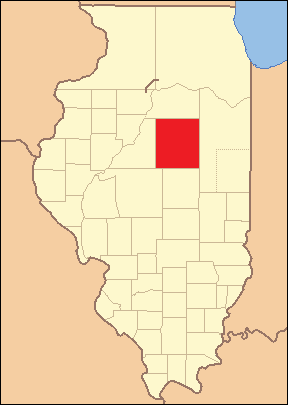
McLean County from the time of its creation to 1837

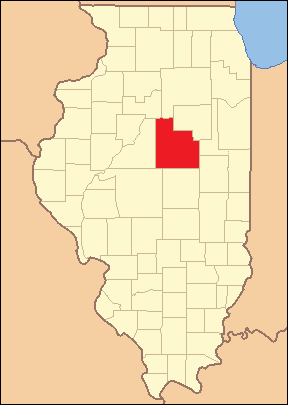
McLean County between 1837 and 1841

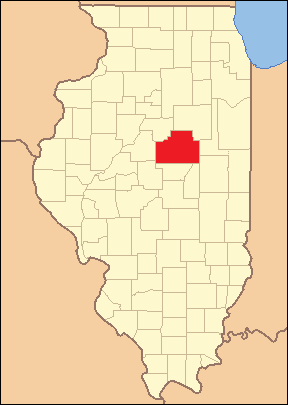
McLean County in 1841, reduced to its present borders

== Geography ==
According to the U.S. Census Bureau, the county has a total area of 1,186 square miles (3,070 km^{2}), of which 1,183 square miles (3,060 km^{2}) is land and 2.9 square miles (7.5 km^{2}) (0.2%) is water. It is the largest county in Illinois by land area and third-largest by total area after Cook and Lake Counties, which have large portions of their areas on Lake Michigan. McLean County is actually larger than the land area of Rhode Island (1045 sq mi).

=== Climate and weather ===
Bloomington, Illinois

Climate chart (precipitation, max. and min. temperature)
J	F	M	A	M	J	J	A	S	O	N	D
1.7 31 14	1.7 37 18	2.9 48 29	3.8 61 40	4.5 73 51	3.9 83 61	4 86 65	3.8 84 63	3 77 54	2.7 65 42	3.1 49 31	2.4 36 20
- █ Average max. and min. temperatures in °F
- █ Precipitation totals in inches
- Source: The Weather Channel
Metric conversion
J	F	M	A	M	J	J	A	S	O	N	D
44 −1 −10	43 3 −8	73 9 −2	97 16 4	115 23 11	99 28 16	100 30 18	97 29 17	75 25 12	69 18 6	78 9 −1	61 2 −7
- █ Average max. and min. temperatures in °C
- █ Precipitation totals in mm

In recent years, average temperatures in the county seat of Bloomington have ranged from a low of 14 °F (−10 °C) in January to a high of 86 °F (30 °C) in July, although a record low of −23 °F (−31 °C) was recorded in January 1985 and a record high of 103 °F (39 °C) was recorded in June 1988. Average monthly precipitation ranged from 1.71 inches (43 mm) in February to 4.52 inches (115 mm) in May.

=== Adjacent counties ===
- Woodford County – northwest
- Livingston County – northeast
- Ford County – east
- Champaign County – southeast
- Piatt County – south
- DeWitt County – south
- Logan County – southwest
- Tazewell County – west

=== Major highways ===
- I-39
- I-55
  - I-55 BL (Bloomington–Normal)
- I-74
- US 24
- US 51
  - US 51 Bus. (Bloomington–Normal)
- US 136
- US 150
- IL 9
- IL 54 (former US 54)
- IL 122
- IL 165
- IL 251 (former US 51)

=== Transit ===
- Connect Transit
- SHOW Bus
- Uptown Station
- List of intercity bus stops in Illinois

== Demographics ==
Historical population
Census	Pop.	Note	%±
1840	6,565		—
1850	10,163		54.8%
1860	28,772		183.1%
1870	53,988		87.6%
1880	60,100		11.3%
1890	63,036		4.9%
1900	67,843		7.6%
1910	68,008		0.2%
1920	70,107		3.1%
1930	73,117		4.3%
1940	73,930		1.1%
1950	76,577		3.6%
1960	83,877		9.5%
1970	104,389		24.5%
1980	119,149		14.1%
1990	129,180		8.4%
2000	150,433		16.5%
2010	169,572		12.7%
2020	170,954		0.8%
2025 (est.)	171,419	▲	0.3%
U.S. Decennial Census; 1790-1960 1900-1990; 1990-2000 2010-2019

=== 2020 census ===
As of the 2020 census, the county had a population of 170,954. The median age was 35.1 years, 21.5% of residents were under the age of 18, and 14.4% of residents were 65 years of age or older. For every 100 females there were 94.9 males, and for every 100 females age 18 and over there were 92.5 males age 18 and over.

The racial makeup of the county was 77.3% White, 8.8% Black or African American, 0.3% American Indian and Alaska Native, 4.8% Asian, <0.1% Native Hawaiian and Pacific Islander, 2.5% from some other race, and 6.3% from two or more races. Hispanic or Latino residents of any race comprised 6.2% of the population.

78.4% of residents lived in urban areas, while 21.6% lived in rural areas.

There were 69,096 households in the county, of which 28.5% had children under the age of 18 living in them. Of all households, 45.2% were married-couple households, 20.4% were households with a male householder and no spouse or partner present, and 27.8% were households with a female householder and no spouse or partner present. About 31.5% of all households were made up of individuals and 10.3% had someone living alone who was 65 years of age or older.

There were 74,855 housing units, of which 7.7% were vacant. Among occupied housing units, 64.2% were owner-occupied and 35.8% were renter-occupied. The homeowner vacancy rate was 1.5% and the rental vacancy rate was 9.6%.

=== Racial and ethnic composition ===
McLean County, Illinois – Racial and ethnic composition Note: the US Census treats Hispanic/Latino as an ethnic category. This table excludes Latinos from the racial categories and assigns them to a separate category. Hispanics/Latinos may be of any race.
Race / Ethnicity (NH = Non-Hispanic)	Pop 1980	Pop 1990	Pop 2000	Pop 2010	Pop 2020	% 1980	% 1990	% 2000	% 2010	% 2020
White alone (NH)	112,222	120,156	132,224	138,835	129,440	94.19%	93.01%	87.90%	81.87%	75.72%
Black or African American alone (NH)	4,689	5,485	9,189	12,246	14,699	3.94%	4.25%	6.11%	7.22%	8.60%
Native American or Alaska Native alone (NH)	106	180	224	290	258	0.09%	0.14%	0.15%	0.17%	0.15%
Asian alone (NH)	811	1,609	3,072	7,180	8,108	0.68%	1.25%	2.04%	4.23%	4.74%
Native Hawaiian or Pacific Islander alone (NH)	x	x	43	48	38	x	x	0.03%	0.03%	0.02%
Other race alone (NH)	202	79	145	203	618	0.17%	0.06%	0.10%	0.12%	0.36%
Mixed race or Multiracial (NH)	x	x	1,703	3,336	7,269	x	x	1.13%	1.97%	4.25%
Hispanic or Latino (any race)	1,119	1,671	3,833	7,434	10,524	0.94%	1.29%	2.55%	4.38%	6.16%
Total	119,149	129,180	150,433	169,572	170,954	100.00%	100.00%	100.00%	100.00%	100.00%

=== 2010 census ===
As of the 2010 United States census, there were 169,572 people, 65,104 households, and 40,124 families residing in the county. The population density was 143.3 inhabitants per square mile (55.3/km^{2}). There were 69,656 housing units at an average density of 58.9 per square mile (22.7/km^{2}). The racial makeup of the county was 84.3% white, 7.3% black or African American, 4.3% Asian, 0.2% American Indian, 1.5% from other races, and 2.3% from two or more races. Those of Hispanic or Latino origin made up 4.4% of the population. In terms of ancestry, 31.2% were German, 15.4% were Irish, 11.4% were American, and 11.0% were English.

Of the 65,104 households, 31.4% had children under the age of 18 living with them, 48.5% were married couples living together, 9.6% had a female householder with no husband present, 38.4% were non-families, and 28.1% of all households were made up of individuals. The average household size was 2.44 and the average family size was 3.02. The median age was 32.1 years.

The median income for a household in the county was $57,642 and the median income for a family was $77,093. Males had a median income of $52,271 versus $39,685 for females. The per capita income for the county was $28,167. About 6.2% of families and 12.9% of the population were below the poverty line, including 11.4% of those under age 18 and 5.5% of those age 65 or over.

== Communities ==
=== Cities ===
- Bloomington (seat)
- Chenoa
- El Paso
- Le Roy
- Lexington

=== Town ===
- Normal

=== Villages ===
- Anchor
- Arrowsmith
- Bellflower
- Carlock
- Colfax
- Cooksville
- Danvers
- Downs
- Ellsworth
- Gridley
- Heyworth
- Hudson
- McLean
- Saybrook
- Stanford
- Towanda

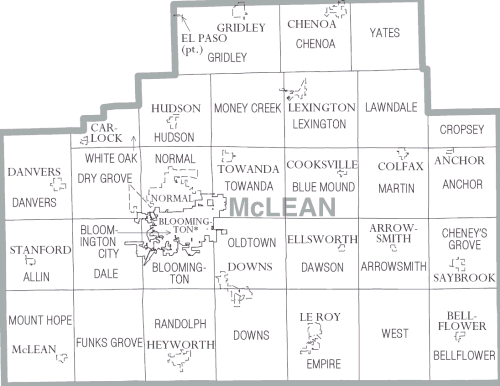
Map of McLean County, Illinois

=== Census-designated place ===
- Shirley
- Twin Grove

=== Other unincorporated communities ===
- Barnes
- Bentown
- Bloomington Heights
- Covell
- Cropsey
- Fletcher
- Funks Grove
- Gillum
- Holder
- Kerrick
- Lytleville
- Meadows
- Merna
- Osman
- Padua
- Randolph
- Sabina
- Shirley
- Watkins
- Weedman
- Weston
- Yuton

=== Townships ===
McLean County is divided into these townships:

- Allin
- Anchor
- Arrowsmith
- Bellflower
- Bloomington
- Bloomington City
- Blue Mound
- Cheney's Grove
- Chenoa
- Cropsey
- Dale
- Danvers
- Dawson
- Downs
- Dry Grove
- Empire
- Funk's Grove
- Gridley
- Hudson
- Lawndale
- Lexington
- Martin
- Money Creek
- Mount Hope
- Normal
- Old Town
- Randolph
- Towanda
- West
- White Oak
- Yates

=== Ghost towns ===
- Allin
- Benjaminville
- Kumler

== Government ==
McLean County has a twenty-member board representing ten districts within the county. Each district elects two members. Districts 1-3 encompass all of the county outside of Bloomington and Normal. Districts 4-6 are within the town limits of Normal, and districts 7-10 are within Bloomington city limits.

=== Politics ===
United States presidential election results for McLean County, Illinois
Year	Republican		Democratic		Third party(ies)	
Year	No.	%	No.	%	No.	%
1892	7,445	50.43%	6,487	43.94%	832	5.64%
1896	9,964	59.62%	6,328	37.87%	420	2.51%
1900	9,487	56.41%	6,613	39.32%	718	4.27%
1904	8,772	58.66%	4,149	27.74%	2,034	13.60%
1908	8,953	55.88%	5,982	37.33%	1,088	6.79%
1912	4,624	30.23%	5,356	35.02%	5,314	34.75%
1916	14,988	53.22%	11,699	41.54%	1,473	5.23%
1920	16,680	65.27%	6,411	25.09%	2,464	9.64%
1924	16,550	55.95%	6,826	23.07%	6,206	20.98%
1928	20,780	65.37%	10,742	33.79%	267	0.84%
1932	15,450	43.07%	19,535	54.46%	886	2.47%
1936	16,826	43.00%	21,508	54.96%	798	2.04%
1940	21,865	54.44%	18,024	44.87%	277	0.69%
1944	19,366	57.70%	14,011	41.75%	185	0.55%
1948	18,430	58.48%	12,904	40.94%	183	0.58%
1952	24,494	64.75%	13,296	35.15%	36	0.10%
1956	25,758	67.59%	12,332	32.36%	21	0.06%
1960	24,758	63.87%	13,971	36.04%	32	0.08%
1964	19,120	49.44%	19,550	50.56%	0	0.00%
1968	22,284	59.22%	12,779	33.96%	2,567	6.82%
1972	31,060	67.59%	14,824	32.26%	71	0.15%
1976	28,493	62.10%	16,601	36.18%	785	1.71%
1980	30,096	61.13%	13,587	27.60%	5,549	11.27%
1984	32,221	66.64%	15,880	32.84%	248	0.51%
1988	30,572	61.75%	18,659	37.69%	280	0.57%
1992	25,726	43.39%	23,090	38.95%	10,469	17.66%
1996	26,428	49.46%	22,708	42.50%	4,299	8.05%
2000	34,008	55.84%	24,936	40.95%	1,954	3.21%
2004	41,276	57.63%	29,877	41.72%	467	0.65%
2008	36,767	48.46%	37,689	49.67%	1,422	1.87%
2012	39,947	54.37%	31,883	43.40%	1,639	2.23%
2016	37,237	45.79%	36,196	44.51%	7,891	9.70%
2020	40,502	46.35%	43,933	50.27%	2,952	3.38%
2024	40,290	46.25%	44,495	51.08%	2,330	2.67%

Like most of central Illinois, McLean County is historically Republican-leaning. The only Democrats to gain an absolute majority of the county's vote before the 21st century have been Franklin D. Roosevelt in 1932 and 1936, and Lyndon Johnson by a mere 1.2% in 1964. Woodrow Wilson in 1912 and Illinois resident Barack Obama in 2008 both carried the county by narrow pluralities.

In recent years, however, McLean has trended sufficiently Democratic that Hillary Clinton in 2016 lost the county by just 1.3 percent, while Joe Biden won the county in 2020 with a narrow majority.

Further solidifying the county's leftward shift in the 2020s, Governor J. B. Pritzker won the county by 1.3% in 2022, making it the first time since 1948 it supported a Democrat for governor.

In 2024, Kamala Harris became the first Democratic presidential nominee to win McLean County yet lose the presidential election. The county shifted left by about 1% from 2020 to 2024, despite both Illinois and the country shifting rightward.

McLean County is one of only thirteen counties to have voted for Obama in 2008, Romney in 2012, Trump in 2016, and Biden in 2020. (Note: The other twelve are Butte County, California; Teton County, Idaho; Kent County, Maryland; Kendall County, Illinois; Tippecanoe County, Indiana; Kent County, Michigan; Leelanau County, Michigan; Carroll County, New Hampshire; Rockingham County, New Hampshire; Marion County, Oregon; Grand County, Utah; and Albany County, Wyoming.)

== Education ==
Here is a list of school districts (all fully K-12) with territory in the county, no matter how slight, even if the district's schools and/or administrative offices are not in the county:

- Blue Ridge Community Unit School District 18
- Bloomington School District 87
- El Paso-Gridley Community Unit School District 11
- Gibson City-Melvin-Sibley Community Unit School District 5
- Heyworth Community Unit School District 4
- Le Roy Community Unit School District 2
- Lexington Community Unit School District 7
- McLean County Unit School District 5
- Olympia Community Unit School District 16
- Prairie Central Community Unit School District 8
- Ridgeview Community Unit School District 19
- Tri-Valley Community Unit School District 3

Illinois State University is in the county.

== Notable persons ==
- George J. Mecherle, founder of State Farm
- Adlai Stevenson II, Governor of Illinois (1949–53), two-time Democratic nominee for the U.S. presidency, and Ambassador to the United Nations (1961–65)
- Pokey LaFarge, musician and songwriter
- Bonnie Lou, recording artist and television celebrity
- William H. Rowe, farmer, businessman, and politician
- Archbishop Fulton J. Sheen, host of popular 1950/60 T.V. program Life is Worth Living and Catholic Archbishop of the Diocese of Rochester, New York

== See also ==
- National Register of Historic Places listings in McLean County, Illinois
