= Bloomer Shippers Connecting Railroad =

American shortline railroad

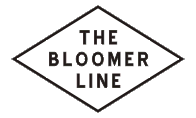

Overview
- Headquarters: Gibson City, Illinois
- Reporting mark: BLOL
- Locale: Central Illinois
- Dates of operation: 1985–present

Technical
- Track gauge: 4 ft 8 1/2 in (1,435 mm) standard gauge

The Bloomer Shippers Connecting Railroad (or Bloomer Line) (reporting mark BLOL), headquartered in Gibson City, Illinois, is a Class III railroad serving the agricultural communities of Ford, Mclean and Livingston counties in east-central Illinois. Its primary traffic is from servicing grain elevators owned by the Alliance Grain Company, with loads such as corn, soybeans and wheat, but also potash, DAP and raw plastic to Gibson City, where they are interchanged with the Norfolk Southern, Canadian National and at Chatsworth with the Toledo, Peoria and Western short line. It is composed of 2 connected lines, one from Colfax to Kempton and another from Gibson City, to Strawn, where the lines meet.

Location of The Bloomer line in Illinois

== History ==
In June 1985, the Illinois Central Gulf Railroad (ICG) sold a portion of its circuitous route between Kankakee and Bloomington to a new spin-off railroad company which called itself "The Bloomer Line" (after the ex-Illinois Central Railroad division it had purchased). Specifically, the Bloomer Line purchased the right-of-way between Herscher and Barnes. In May 1990, the railroad purchased the former Wabash Railroad line from near Strawn, south to Gibson City from the Norfolk and Western. Connections to N&W successor Norfolk Southern and ICG's successor Canadian National Railway are made at Gibson City. The railroad has since taken the lines from Herscher to Kempton and from Barnes to Colfax out of service.

== Operations ==
The Bloomer Line is owned and operated by Alliance Grain Company, which owns the eight grain elevators served by the railroad. It is primarily a grain transporter, shipping carloads of corn, soybeans and wheat from these locations to the connecting railroads of Norfolk Southern and Canadian National at Gibson City, and the Toledo, Peoria & Western at Chatsworth for further transport. The Norfolk Southern can interchange 75 standard cars and the Canadian National can interchange 100 cars.

The line also serves several other agriculture related industries. These include raw plastic shipments to a drainage tile company in Chatsworth and shipments of potash in roughly 70 car amounts to the Colfax Potash Center, as well as potash and DAP to Heritage FS in Charlotte and Evergreen FS in Anchor.

Bloomer Line locomotives are painted bright red and labeled in a font which looks very similar to that used on the former Chicago, Burlington and Quincy Railroad. Locomotive maintenance was conducted at Chatsworth until shops were constructed at Gibson City after the Norfolk & Western Line from Strawn to Gibson city was purchased.

== Locomotive roster ==
Locomotive Number	Locomotive Model	Notes
BLOL 1	Plymouth Locomotive Works DE 12-ton	Lettered for Alliance Grain, BLOL's parent company
BLOL 7504	EMD GP10 (GP9 Rebuild)	Ex-BLOL 704 < SPCX 704 < OHCR 704 < MSRC 1083 < GMSR 8222 < Illinois Central Gulf 8222 < née Illinois Central 9222
BLOL 7549	EMD GP10 (GP9 Rebuild)	Retains high hood. Ex-Conrail 7549 < CR 7343 < Penn Central 7515 < New York Central 7515 < née NYC 5943
BLOL 7561	EMD GP10 (GP9 Rebuild)	Ex-Conrail 7561 < CR 7402 < Penn Central 7402 < New York Central 7402 < née NYC 6002
BLOL 7591	EMD GP9	Has a short hood. Ex-Burlington Northern 1949 < née Northern Pacific 370
LTEX 3801	EMD GP38-2	Leased from Larry's Truck and Electric. Heritage unknown.
LTEX 3802	EMD GP38-2	Leased from Larry's Truck and Electric. Rebuilt from EMD GP35 of Missouri Pacific heritage. Previously rebuilt to GP35M by MP.
