= Twin Grove, Illinois =

- Census-designated place
- Location within Illinois Location within the United States
- Coordinates: 40°29′36″N 89°04′47″W
- Country: United States
- State: Illinois
- County: McLean
- Townships: Dale, Dry Grove

Area
  - Total: 3.97 sq mi (10.29 km^{2})
  - Land: 3.97 sq mi (10.27 km^{2})
  - Water: 0.0077 sq mi (0.02 km^{2})
- Elevation: 817 ft (249 m)

Population (2020)
  - Total: 1,524
  - Density: 384.5/sq mi (148.46/km^{2})
- Time zone: UTC-6 (Central (CST))
  - Summer (DST): UTC-5 (CDT)
- ZIP Code: 61705 (Bloomington)
- Area code: 309
- GNIS feature ID: 2628561
- FIPS code: 17-76511

Twin Grove is an unincorporated community and census-designated place (CDP) in McLean County, Illinois, United States. As of the 2020 census, Twin Grove had a population of 1,524.

== Geography ==
Twin Grove is in western McLean County on both sides of Illinois Route 9. It is 5 miles (8 km) west of Bloomington, the county seat.

According to the U.S. Census Bureau, the Twin Grove CDP has an area of 3.97 square miles (10.28 km^{2}), of which 0.01 square miles (0.03 km^{2}), or 0.25%, are water. Kings Mill Creek flows southward through the western part of the community, leading to the Middle Fork of Sugar Creek, part of the Sangamon River watershed flowing west to the Illinois River.

== Demographics ==
Historical population
Census	Pop.	Note	%±
2010	1,564		—
2020	1,524		−2.6%
U.S. Decennial Census

=== 2020 census ===
As of the 2020 census, Twin Grove had a population of 1,524. The median age was 51.1 years. 19.9% of residents were under the age of 18 and 23.4% of residents were 65 years of age or older. For every 100 females there were 119.6 males, and for every 100 females age 18 and over there were 114.2 males age 18 and over.

69.3% of residents lived in urban areas, while 30.7% lived in rural areas.

There were 601 households in Twin Grove, of which 25.5% had children under the age of 18 living in them. Of all households, 73.5% were married-couple households, 10.5% were households with a male householder and no spouse or partner present, and 11.1% were households with a female householder and no spouse or partner present. About 14.7% of all households were made up of individuals and 9.0% had someone living alone who was 65 years of age or older.

There were 617 housing units, of which 2.6% were vacant. The homeowner vacancy rate was 1.5% and the rental vacancy rate was 0.0%.

Racial composition as of the 2020 census
Race	Number	Percent
White	1,364	89.5%
Black or African American	30	2.0%
American Indian and Alaska Native	4	0.3%
Asian	19	1.2%
Native Hawaiian and Other Pacific Islander	0	0.0%
Some other race	24	1.6%
Two or more races	83	5.4%
Hispanic or Latino (of any race)	58	3.8%

== Education ==
The western portion is in the Olympia Community Unit School District 16. The eastern portion is in the McLean County Unit School District 5.
