= Prairie Township, Hancock County, Illinois =

Prairie Township
- Township
- Township building in Elvaston

- Location in Hancock County

- Hancock County's location in Illinois
- Coordinates: 40°25′28″N 91°12′26″W
- Country: United States
- State: Illinois
- County: Hancock
- Established: September 12, 1854

Area
  - Total: 33.12 sq mi (85.8 km^{2})
  - Land: 33.07 sq mi (85.7 km^{2})
  - Water: 0.05 sq mi (0.13 km^{2}) 0.15%
- Elevation: 699 ft (213 m)

Population (2020)
  - Total: 382
  - Density: 11.6/sq mi (4.46/km^{2})
- Time zone: UTC-6 (CST)
  - Summer (DST): UTC-5 (CDT)
- ZIP codes: 62321, 62334, 62341, 62379
- FIPS code: 17-067-61496

Prairie Township is one of twenty-four townships in Hancock County, Illinois, USA. As of the 2020 census, its population was 382 and it contained 186 housing units. It was formed from Montebello and Carthage townships on September 12, 1854.

== Geography ==
According to the 2021 census gazetteer files, Prairie Township has a total area of 33.12 square miles (85.78 km^{2}), of which 33.07 square miles (85.65 km^{2}) (or 99.85%) is land and 0.05 square miles (0.13 km^{2}) (or 0.15%) is water.

=== Cities, towns, villages ===
- Elvaston (east portion)
- Ferris (south edge)

=== Unincorporated towns ===
- McCall at 40.452822°N 91.19709°W

(This list is based on USGS data and may include former settlements.)

=== Cemeteries ===
The township contains Elvaston Cemetery.

=== Major highways ===
- U.S. Route 136

=== Airports and landing strips ===
- Hanks Hangar Airport
- Kirchner Airport
- Martins Airport
- Schilson Field

== Demographics ==
Historical population
Census	Pop.	Note	%±
1860	575		—
1870	1,380		140.0%
1880	1,223		−11.4%
1890	1,088		−11.0%
1900	1,004		−7.7%
1910	881		−12.3%
1920	813		−7.7%
1930	731		−10.1%
1940	717		−1.9%
1950	660		−7.9%
1960	604		−8.5%
1970	582		−3.6%
1980	536		−7.9%
1990	449		−16.2%
2000	385		−14.3%
2010	380		−1.3%
2020	382		0.5%
U.S. Decennial Census

As of the 2020 census there were 382 people, 120 households, and 75 families residing in the township. The population density was 11.53 inhabitants per square mile (4.45/km^{2}). There were 186 housing units at an average density of 5.62 per square mile (2.17/km^{2}). The racial makeup of the township was 96.60% White, 0.52% African American, 0.26% Native American, 0.00% Asian, 0.00% Pacific Islander, 0.26% from other races, and 2.36% from two or more races. Hispanic or Latino of any race were 1.83% of the population.

There were 120 households, out of which 13.30% had children under the age of 18 living with them, 50.00% were married couples living together, 3.33% had a female householder with no spouse present, and 37.50% were non-families. 37.50% of all households were made up of individuals, and 20.00% had someone living alone who was 65 years of age or older. The average household size was 2.12 and the average family size was 2.75.

The township's age distribution consisted of 16.1% under the age of 18, 6.3% from 18 to 24, 13% from 25 to 44, 31.5% from 45 to 64, and 33.1% who were 65 years of age or older. The median age was 57.6 years. For every 100 females, there were 100.0 males. For every 100 females age 18 and over, there were 99.1 males.

The median income for a household in the township was $50,870, and the median income for a family was $56,875. Males had a median income of $26,250 versus $18,750 for females. The per capita income for the township was $23,502. About 9.3% of families and 11.8% of the population were below the poverty line, including 19.5% of those under age 18 and 1.2% of those age 65 or over.

== School districts ==
- Hamilton Community Consolidated School District 328

== Political districts ==
- Illinois's 18th congressional district
- State House District 94
- State Senate District 47
