= Mannville =

Mannville may refer to:

- Mannville, Alberta, a town in Alberta, Canada
- Mannville Group, a stratigraphical unit in the Western Canadian Sedimentary Basin

== See also ==
- Manville (disambiguation)
