= Lytleville, Illinois =

- Unincorporated community
- Location within Illinois Location within the United States
- Coordinates: 40°20′30″N 88°57′20″W
- Country: United States
- State: Illinois
- County: McLean
- Township: Randolph
- Elevation: 755 ft (230 m)
- Time zone: UTC-6 (CST)
  - Summer (DST): UTC-5 (CDT)
- Postal code: 61745
- Area code: 309

Lytleville is an unincorporated community in McLean County, Illinois, United States, located south of Bloomington-Normal, and is approximately 3½ miles northeast of Heyworth in Randolph Township. The community was laid out by John Baldwin in 1836, around his sawmill. Baldwin named the town after a friend, Robert T. Lytle, a Democrat who was a U.S. Congressman from Ohio from 1833 to 1835.

== History ==
At one time, Lytleville was a thriving village with a population of about 100. Possibly the first water-powered sawmill and grist mill in McLean County were located here, having been built by James Hedrick in 1833. Three years later, he sold it to Baldwin.

Baldwin had been a wicked and boisterous man, then was converted and became a preacher. He engaged in revival work with great spirit and zeal. He was considered crazy by many, but faithful to his profession was Baldwin. Stories are told of his prophesying when under strong religious excitement, but there is no record of fulfillment. His brother James Baldwin was the earliest doctor in the community and lived on a farm east of the mill property.

John Baldwin had a “wicked partner” who persisted in running the mill on Sunday. It was an old-fashioned gate-saw, which went so slow that there seemed to be a sort of an excuse for putting in all the time when the water was up. Baldwin used to go to the mill Sundays and expostulate with his partner, and while arguing the matter (the mill running in the meantime), the sawyer would get him to help turn down the log and set the tail end for him. All these kind acts did not convert him and the partnership dissolved.

A bustling trading center for dry goods, groceries and whiskey, it contested strongly with Waynesville and Bloomington for the chief place in the future greatness of this part of the county. A post office was established, stores and trade grew up, and it reportedly lacked but one vote of the committee to be the county seat of McLean County (information given here acquired from Dave Hartson, born in Lytleville in 1834. Mr. Hartson died July 1922, six weeks after the author’s visit). There has been considerable controversy about this, one side holding that it was at one time considered for the Illinois state capital, the other side holding that it was considered only for county seat. The capital has changed twice since 1818, once from Kaskaskia to Vandalia, and once from Vandalia to Springfield. The first was before Lytleville was founded; therefore, the only time it could conceivable have been considered was in 1836 when Springfield, Illiopolis, and several other towns were in competition. This seems unlikely as the village had barely even been laid out by this time.

The first school, Lytleville School No. 18, was a log house with crude benches and slabs on pegs for seats built in the 1830s. Later, a frame house was erected in the 1840s just across the road to the north. A Methodist church, at the south end of State Street, was built in 1874 and sold to the school district in 1886. This building served as a schoolhouse with remodeling and standardizing in 1921. It burned Jan. 15, 1931 and a new schoolhouse costing about $2,800 was built in the summer of 1931. Though the attendance dwindled as compared to the large enrollments of former years, it remained a place for public meetings. Lytleville school joined the Heyworth Community Unit School District in 1948 and the building was sold, becoming a private residence that still stands.

Around 1854, the Illinois Central Railroad began building its main line through McLean County. During a heated contest to decide the exact location of the railroad, Heyworth founder Campbell Wakefield donated land to railroad officials to entice them to build through his land, which the company eventually did. This placed the rail line about three miles west of Lytleville, which declined rapidly in the following years as people moved to the new town of Heyworth.

Today, there is little trace of the original village except a scattering of homes, none of which are original to the village of Lytleville. A later version of the Lytleville School, rebuilt in the 1930s following a fire, serves as a private residence.
