= Covell, Illinois =

- Unincorporated community
- Location within Illinois Location within the United States
- Coordinates: 40°26′34″N 89°06′30″W
- Country: United States
- State: Illinois
- County: McLean
- Township: Dale
- Elevation: 702 ft (214 m)
- Time zone: UTC-6 (CST)
  - Summer (DST): UTC-5 (CDT)
- Zip code: 61705
- Area code: 309

Covell is an unincorporated community in Dale Township, McLean County, Illinois, United States.

Covell lies along East 1000 North Road, about seven miles west of downtown Bloomington, and six miles east of Stanford.

Charles Lindbergh crashed in the area on the night of November 3, 1926.

Covell is also home to the Central Illinois Stix Baseball Club.
