= Shale City, Illinois =

- Unincorporated community
- Location within Illinois Location within the United States
- Coordinates: 41°13′11″N 90°38′26″W
- Country: United States
- State: Illinois
- County: Mercer
- Elevation: 722 ft (220 m)
- Time zone: UTC-6 (Central (CST))
  - Summer (DST): UTC-5 (CDT)
- Area code: 309
- GNIS feature ID: 418274

Shale City is an unincorporated community in Greene Township, Mercer County, Illinois, United States. Shale City is 3 miles (4.8 km) west-northwest of Viola.

Shale City was the home of the Continental Brick factory. In 1915, the factory was sold to the Hydraulic Press Brick Company of St. Louis. Shale City was a company town of about 40 houses, a grocery store, a pool hall, a gas station, and a school.

In 1910, a spur was constructed off the Gilchrist to Aledo branch of the Rock Island Southern Railway. The spur connected just west of Gilchrist.
