= Dry Grove Township, McLean County, Illinois =

Coordinates: 40°31′37″N 89°05′27″W

Dry Grove Township
- Township
- Location in McLean County

- McLean County's location in Illinois
- Country: United States
- State: Illinois
- County: McLean
- Established: November 3, 1857

Area
  - Total: 35.61 sq mi (92.2 km^{2})
  - Land: 35.58 sq mi (92.2 km^{2})
  - Water: 0.03 sq mi (0.078 km^{2}) 0.08%

Population (2010)
  - Estimate (2016): 1,579
  - Density: 44.2/sq mi (17.1/km^{2})
- Time zone: UTC-6 (CST)
  - Summer (DST): UTC-5 (CDT)
- FIPS code: 17-113-20838
- Website: drygrovetownship.org

Dry Grove Township is located in McLean County, Illinois. As of the 2010 census, its population was 1,572 and it contained 618 housing units. It contains part of the census-designated place of Twin Grove.

Dry Grove Township took its name after Dry Grove, an area of forest at a relatively high and dry elevation.

== Geography ==
According to the 2010 census, the township has a total area of 35.61 square miles (92.2 km^{2}), of which 35.58 square miles (92.2 km^{2}) (or 99.92%) is land and 0.03 square miles (0.078 km^{2}) (or 0.08%) is water.

== Demographics ==
Historical population
Census	Pop.	Note	%±
2016 (est.)	1,579
U.S. Decennial Census
