= Randolph, Illinois =

- Unincorporated community
- Location within Illinois Location within the United States
- Coordinates: 40°22′34″N 88°58′49″W
- Country: United States
- State: Illinois
- County: McLean
- Elevation: 781 ft (238 m)
- Time zone: UTC-6 (Central (CST))
  - Summer (DST): UTC-5 (CDT)
- Area code: 309
- GNIS feature ID: 423100

Randolph is an unincorporated community in McLean County, in the U.S. state of Illinois.

== History ==
A variant name was "Randolph Station". A post office called Randolph's Grove was established in 1833, the name was changed to Randolph in 1862, and the post office closed in 1963. The community has the name of Gardner Randolph, a pioneer settler.
