= Maneval =

Maneval is a surname. Notable people with the surname include:

- Andrew Maneval, American politician
- Hellmut Maneval (1898–1967), German international footballer
- Philip Maneval (born 1956), American composer and arts administrator

== See also ==
- Manville
