= Barnett Township, DeWitt County, Illinois =

Barnett Township
- Township
- Location in DeWitt County

- DeWitt County's location in Illinois
- Coordinates: 40°10′25″N 89°05′44″W
- Country: United States
- State: Illinois
- County: DeWitt
- Established: November 2, 1858

Area
  - Total: 37.39 sq mi (96.8 km^{2})
  - Land: 37.38 sq mi (96.8 km^{2})
  - Water: 0.01 sq mi (0.026 km^{2}) 0.03%
- Elevation: 771 ft (235 m)

Population (2020)
  - Total: 396
  - Density: 10.6/sq mi (4.09/km^{2})
- Time zone: UTC-6 (CST)
  - Summer (DST): UTC-5 (CDT)
- ZIP codes: 61727, 61749, 61777, 61778, 62512
- GNIS feature ID: 0428634
- FIPS code: 17-039-03714

Barnett Township is one of thirteen townships in DeWitt County, Illinois, US. As of the 2020 census, its population was 396 and it contained 186 housing units.

== Geography ==
According to the 2021 census gazetteer files, Barnett Township has a total area of 37.39 square miles (96.84 km^{2}), of which 37.38 square miles (96.81 km^{2}) (or 99.97%) is land and 0.01 square miles (0.03 km^{2}) (or 0.03%) is water.

=== Unincorporated towns ===
- Hallsville at 40.150872°N 89.092863°W
- Jenkins at 40.152815°N 89.033695°W
- Midland City at 40.145317°N 89.133698°W
- Tabor at 40.180595°N 89.134809°W

(This list is based on USGS data and may include former settlements.)

=== Cemeteries ===
The township contains these two cemeteries: Barnett and McClimans.

=== Major highways ===
- Illinois Route 10

=== Airports and landing strips ===
- Hooterville Airport

== Demographics ==
As of the 2020 census there were 396 people, 120 households, and 64 families residing in the township. The population density was 10.59 inhabitants per square mile (4.09/km^{2}). There were 186 housing units at an average density of 4.97 units per square mile (1.92 units/km^{2}). The racial makeup of the township was 95.45% White, 0.25% African American, 0.25% Native American, 0.25% Asian, 0.25% Pacific Islander, 0.51% from other races, and 3.03% from two or more races. Hispanic or Latino of any race were 3.03% of the population.

There were 120 households, out of which 6.70% had children under the age of 18 living with them, 46.67% were married couples living together, none had a female householder with no spouse present, and 46.67% were non-families. 34.20% of all households were made up of individuals, and 12.50% had someone living alone who was 65 years of age or older. The average household size was 2.48 and the average family size was 3.50.

The township's age distribution consisted of 4.7% under the age of 18, 25.3% from 18 to 24, 14.2% from 25 to 44, 39.4% from 45 to 64, and 16.5% who were 65 years of age or older. The median age was 58.3 years. For every 100 females, there were 90.4 males. For every 100 females age 18 and over, there were 99.3 males.

The median income for a household in the township was $88,438. Males had a median income of $66,287 versus $14,722 for females. The per capita income for the township was $48,077. None of the population was below the poverty line.

Historical population
Census	Pop.	Note	%±
1930	839		—
1940	756		−9.9%
1950	693		−8.3%
1960	654		−5.6%
1970	500		−23.5%
1980	571		14.2%
1990	493		−13.7%
2000	526		6.7%
2010	406		−22.8%
2020	396		−2.5%

== School districts ==
- Clinton Community Unit School District 15
- Olympia Community Unit School District 16

== Political districts ==
- State House District 87
- State Senate District 44
