= Ocoya, Illinois =

- Unincorporated community
- Location within the state of Illinois Ocoya (the United States)
- Coordinates: 40°48′18″N 88°41′2″W
- Country: United States
- State: Illinois
- County: Livingston
- Elevation: 673 ft (205 m)
- Time zone: UTC-6 (Central (CST))
  - Summer (DST): UTC-5 (CDT)
- ZIP codes: 61764
- Area codes: 815, 779
- GNIS feature ID: 423031

Ocoya is an unincorporated community in Central Illinois, located in southern Livingston County.

== History ==
Ocoya began as a hamlet containing only a station on the Chicago & Alton Railroad (Now Union Pacific) in 1854. Duff and Cowan, from Pontiac platted it. Its post office opened in 1860 (now closed). The land was purchased by Charles Roadnight, then General Freight Agent of the Chicago, Alton & St. Louis Railroad, who soon after erected a small warehouse and depot. Part of the warehouse was used as a store, Alexander Martin generally attending to the business of Agent, Postmaster and storekeeper. April 30, 1870, Ocoya was officially surveyed and platted. In 1871, the first grain elevator was built and the Baptist church a year later. Overshadowed by Chenoa and Pontiac, it remained tiny. At one point, it contained two stores, a gas station, a church and school. It still has a grain elevator owned by Prairie Central Co-op and a few scattered homes and around 30 residents.

=== Elevator ===
As mentioned above, the most notable structure remaining in Ocoya is the grain elevator. The original wood and metal structure was removed many years ago. Later three, 30 foot diameter and one custom cement bins were built in the 1950s. The old wooden elevator was replaced by four, 40 foot diameter bins were built to the north. Between 2009 and 2015, the southern section of the elevator lost a metal grain bin after it burst open. Later on, but within the same range, the north grain site had a new grain leg installed.

== Location ==
Ocoya is located in Eppards Point Township, at an elevation of 673 feet (205 m). Historic Route 66 runs parallel to the community's border. The community is served by the Pontiac post office.

== Climate ==
The weather in Ocoya is humid continental. The average temperatures during the summer are a high of 85 °F (29 °C) and a low of 63 °F (17 °C). The average temperatures during the winter are a high of 30 °F (−1 °C) and a low of 17 °F (−8 °C). Annual rainfall is approximately 38 inches (97 cm), and there are an average of 194 sunny days per year. Snowfall is 26 inches (66 cm) per year.
