= Lumaghi Heights, Illinois =

- Unincorporated community
- Location within Illinois Location within the United States
- Coordinates: 38°40′13″N 89°56′52″W
- Country: United States
- State: Illinois
- County: Madison
- Elevation: 564 ft (172 m)
- Time zone: UTC-6 (Central (CST))
  - Summer (DST): UTC-5 (CDT)
- Area code: 618
- GNIS feature ID: 412743

Lumaghi Heights is an unincorporated community in Madison County, Illinois, United States. It is located 2.4 miles east of the city of Collinsville.

== History ==
The community was named after Octavius Lumaghi, a doctor who owned smelting companies and coal mines in present-day Collinsville. Born in Italy, he got his education at the University of Milan and moved to St. Louis in 1850. He developed the Lumaghi Coal and Mining Company of St. Louis, which started its developments in 1871. The company thrived while in business, and its last mine ceased operations in 1964.

== See also ==
- Collinsville, Illinois
