= Kedron, Illinois =

- Unincorporated community
- Location within Illinois Location within the United States
- Coordinates: 37°39′56″N 88°20′29″W
- Country: United States
- State: Illinois
- County: Gallatin
- Township: Eagle Creek
- Elevation: 390 ft (120 m)
- Time zone: UTC-6 (Central (CST))
  - Summer (DST): UTC-5 (CDT)
- Area code: 618
- GNIS feature ID: 422859

Kedron is an unincorporated community in Eagle Creek Township, Gallatin County, Illinois, United States. Kedron is 5 miles (8.0 km) south of Equality.
