= Meadows, Illinois =

- Unincorporated community
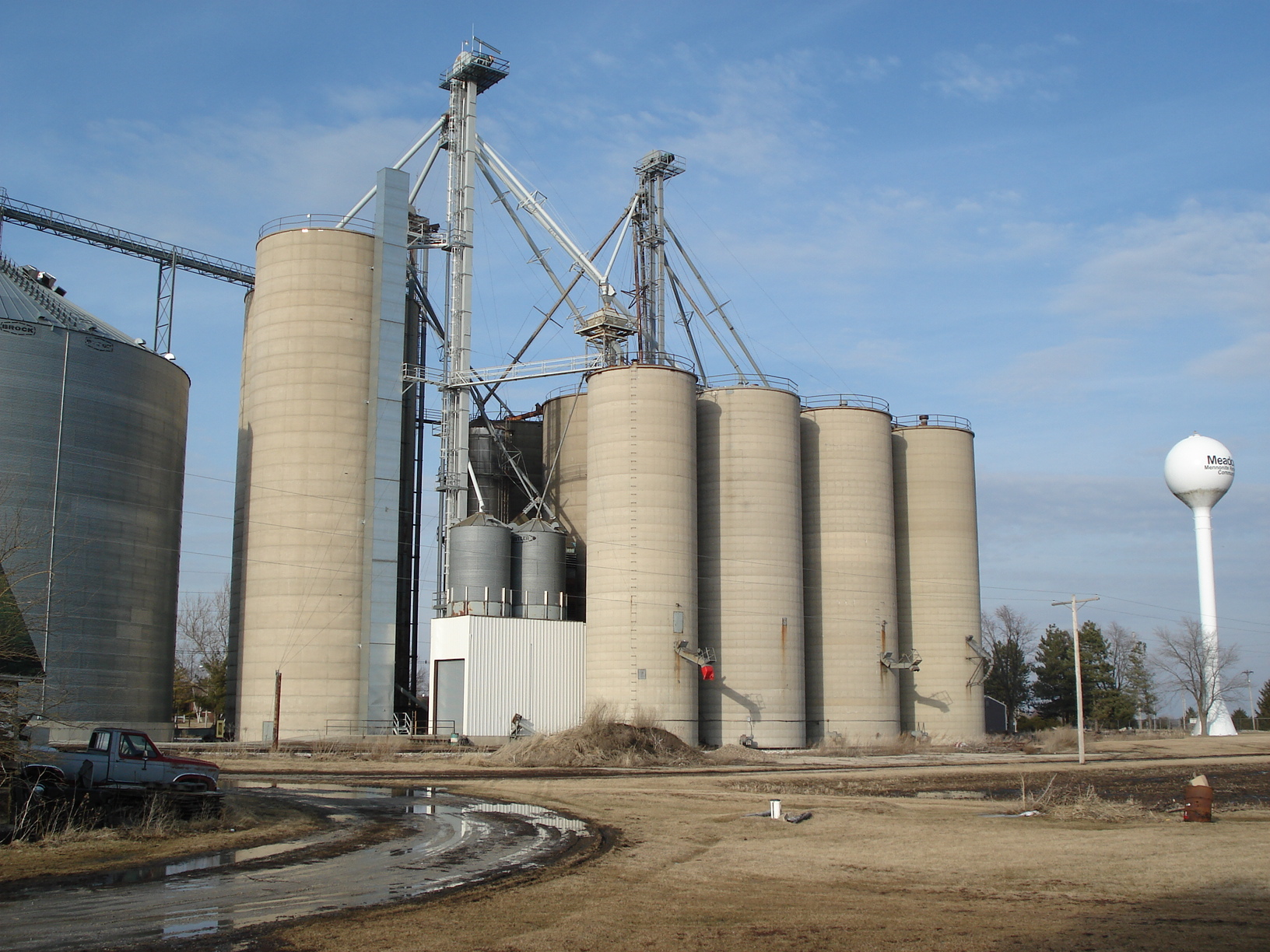
- Grain elevator and water tower in Meadows, IL

- Location of Meadows within Illinois Meadows (the United States)
- Coordinates: 40°44′40″N 88°48′17″W
- Country: United States
- State: Illinois
- County: McLean
- Elevation: 758 ft (231 m)
- Time zone: UTC-6 (CST)
  - Summer (DST): UTC-5 (CDT)
- Postal code: 61726
- Area code: 309

Meadows, Illinois is a small unincorporated community located in McLean County. Meadows is located on US Route 24, midway between Chenoa and Gridley, with easy access from Interstate 55. Meadows at one time had a bank, general store, auto garage, a washing machine factory, and a school. All that remains in town is a nursing home, church, and a grain elevator. One railway line passes through the center of the town.

== History ==
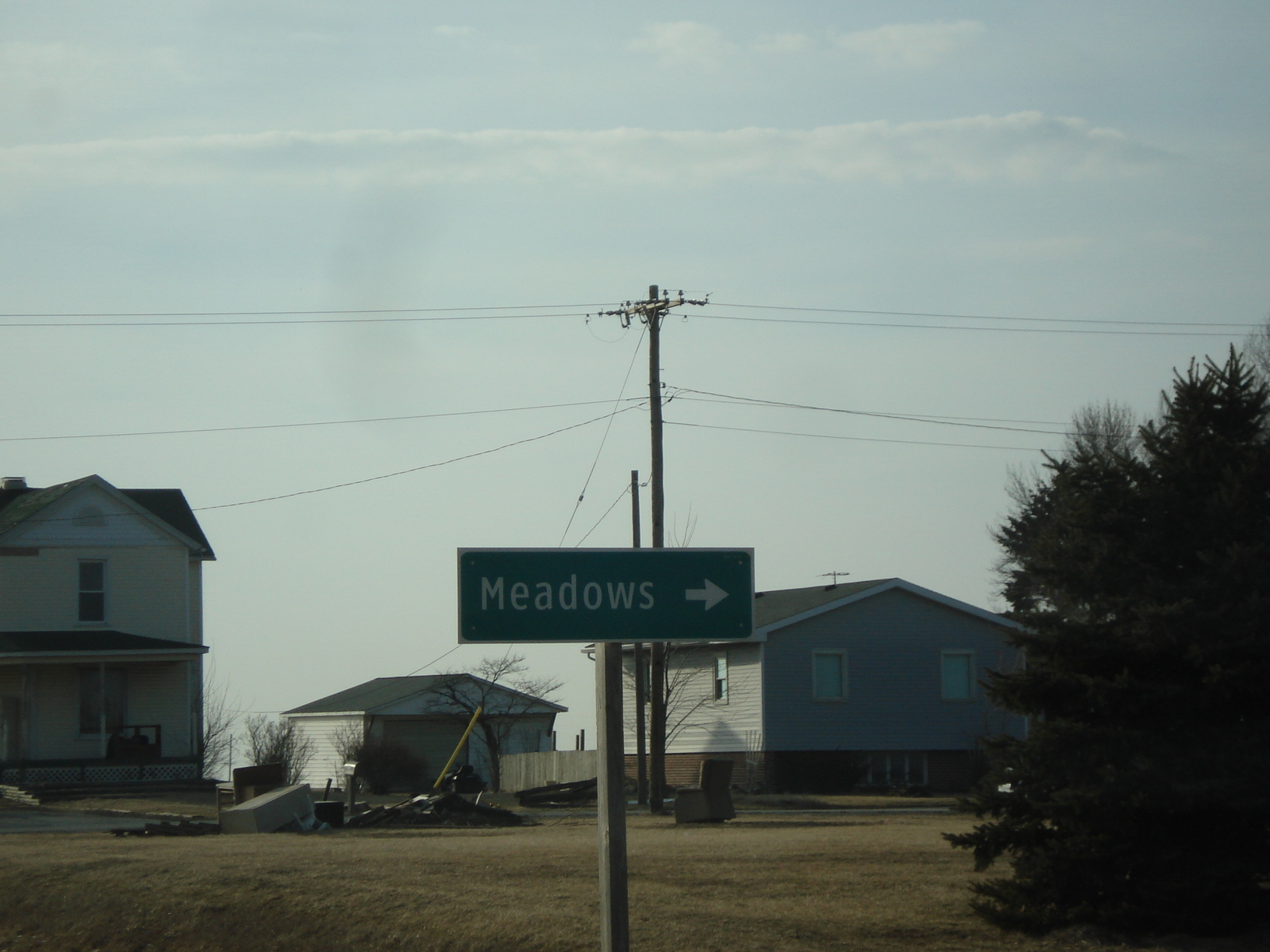
Signage upon entering Meadows.

The town of Meadows was laid out 18 May 1903 by Samuel W. Baker. The Original Town consisted of ten blocks on either side of the railroad with additional lots just north of the tracks. A station with the name Meadows and a small cluster of buildings had existed in this place since at least 1874. In 1877 Charles Parker platted and recorded the land in which he owned in the area now known as Meadows. A post office was located here with Charles Klein being its first postmaster. It also had a store and a grainhouse as well as a train station that stopped along the Toledo, Peoria and Western Railway. Meadows was also home to the Meadows Washer Line, a washing machine manufacture.

== Economy ==
Meadows is home to the Meadows Mennonite Retirement Community which was founded in 1919. It offers Alzheimer and nursing care to the elderly. Meadows is also home to one of the Prairie Central Co-Op grain elevators. It has access to the Toledo, Peoria and Western Railway and is a main grain shipping facility in the area.

== Meadows Mennonite Church ==
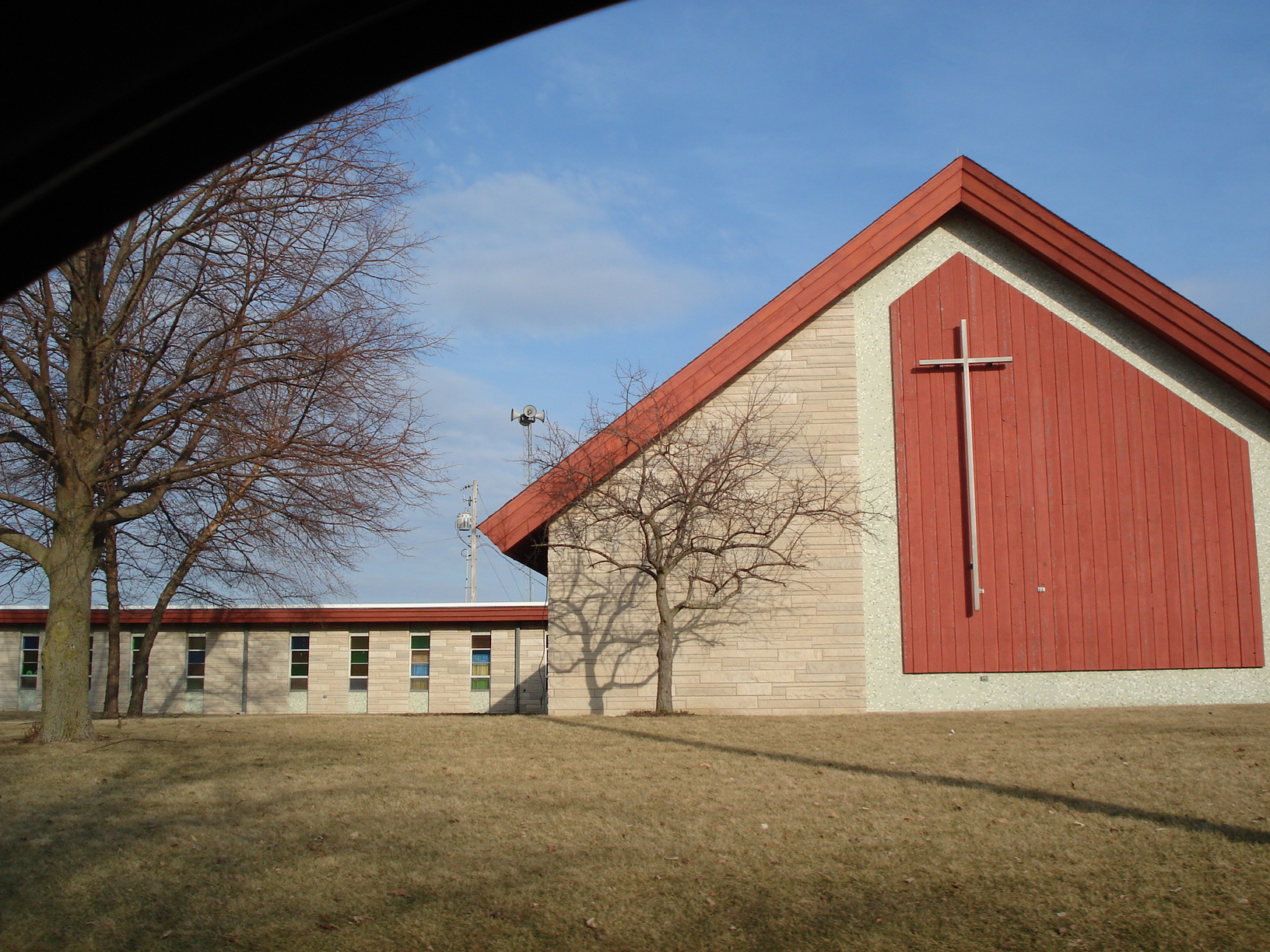
Meadows Mennonite Church 2010.

Meadows Mennonite Church started out as an Alsace Amish congregation in 1874. It wasn't until 1890 that the congregation was officially organized. It then went on to become the charter member of the Central Conference in 1908. Consideration of where the church should be built was a main concern because people of the late 19th century mostly had to be transported by horse and carriage. But Meadows boasted a passenger railway stop, a luxury of the time that most small towns did not have.

The church was built and dedicated in 1909. This building was added on to and updated until a new church was built in 1967. The new building served the congregation until the church closed in 2007. With the advent of the building of Interstate 55, 3 miles to the east near Chenoa, Meadows was then considered out of the way and the local bank in Meadows closed, general store, auto garage, and a school all were closed inevitably, with the interstate being to blame. The church had seen a reduction in congregation since it peaked in the 1940s at 300. It finally made the operating of the day-to-day expenses too much for the church to shoulder and the Meadows Mennonite Church closed on Sunday, August 19, 2007. An end to 117 years in this small community.
