= Harmony, McHenry County, Illinois =

Harmony, Illinois
- Census-designated place
- Location within Illinois Location within the United States
- Coordinates: 42°09′36″N 88°31′43″W
- Country: United States
- State: Illinois
- County: McHenry
- Township: Coral

Area
  - Total: 0.53 sq mi (1.37 km^{2})
  - Land: 0.53 sq mi (1.37 km^{2})
  - Water: 0 sq mi (0.00 km^{2})
- Elevation: 909 ft (277 m)

Population (2020)
  - Total: 20
  - Density: 37.7/sq mi (14.56/km^{2})
- Time zone: UTC-6 (Central (CST))
  - Summer (DST): UTC-5 (CDT)
- Zip: 60142, 60180
- Area codes: 815 & 779
- FIPS code: 17-33019
- GNIS feature ID: 2806496

Harmony is an unincorporated community and census-designated place in McHenry County, Illinois, United States. Harmony is located on U.S. Route 20, 5 miles (8.0 km) west-southwest of Huntley. It was named a CDP before the 2020 census, at which time it had a population of 20.

== Demographics ==
Historical population
Census	Pop.	Note	%±
2020	20		—
U.S. Decennial Census; 2020

Harmony first appeared as a census designated place in the 2020 U.S. census.

=== 2020 census ===
Harmony CDP, Illinois – Racial and ethnic composition Note: the US Census treats Hispanic/Latino as an ethnic category. This table excludes Latinos from the racial categories and assigns them to a separate category. Hispanics/Latinos may be of any race.
Race / Ethnicity (NH = Non-Hispanic)	Pop 2020	% 2020
White alone (NH)	14	70.00%
Black or African American alone (NH)	0	0.00%
Native American or Alaska Native alone (NH)	0	0.00%
Asian alone (NH)	0	0.00%
Native Hawaiian or Pacific Islander alone (NH)	0	0.00%
Other race alone (NH)	0	0.00%
Mixed race or Multiracial (NH)	3	15.00%
Hispanic or Latino (any race)	3	15.00%
Total	20	100.00%
