= Imbs, Illinois =

- Unincorporated community
- Location within Illinois
- Coordinates: 38°31′25″N 90°08′07″W
- Country: United States
- State: Illinois
- County: St. Clair
- Elevation: 449 ft (137 m)
- Time zone: UTC-6 (Central (CST))
  - Summer (DST): UTC-5 (CDT)
- Area code: 618
- GNIS feature ID: 426381

Imbs (also known as Imbs Station) is an unincorporated community in Stookey Township, St. Clair County, Illinois, United States. Imbs is 4.5 miles (7.2 km) southeast of Cahokia.
