= Gillum, Illinois =

- Unincorporated community
- Location within Illinois Location within the United States
- Coordinates: 40°24′28″N 88°53′58″W
- Country: United States
- State: Illinois
- County: McLean
- Elevation: 833 ft (254 m)
- Time zone: UTC-6 (Central (CST))
  - Summer (DST): UTC-5 (CDT)
- Area code: 309
- GNIS feature ID: 409025

Gillum is an unincorporated community in McLean County, Illinois, United States.
