= Randolph Township, McLean County, Illinois =

Coordinates: 40°20′29″N 88°58′56″W

Randolph Township
- Township
- Location in McLean County

- McLean County's location in Illinois
- Country: United States
- State: Illinois
- County: McLean
- Established: November 3, 1857

Area
  - Total: 49.62 sq mi (128.5 km^{2})
  - Land: 49.48 sq mi (128.2 km^{2})
  - Water: 0.14 sq mi (0.36 km^{2}) 0.28%

Population (2010)
  - Estimate (2016): 4,413
  - Density: 88.4/sq mi (34.1/km^{2})
- Time zone: UTC-6 (CST)
  - Summer (DST): UTC-5 (CDT)
- FIPS code: 17-113-62692
- Website: randolphtownship.org

Randolph Township is located in McLean County, Illinois. As of the 2010 census, its population was 4,375 and it contained 1,636 housing units.

Randolph Township was named for Gardner Randolph, who settled in the area in January 1822, near a thick grove of trees later referred to as Randolph's Grove. The village of Heyworth is part of the township.

Randolph Township was formed in 1858 and sent its first supervisor to Bloomington, the county seat, on May 17, 1858. It is Township 22 North, Range 2 East and part of Township 21 North, Range 2 East of the Third Principal Meridian. It has part of the north tier of sections in Township 2, which were taken by McLean County between 1844 and 1849, instead of giving them back to DeWitt County, when it was formed. It is 6x8 instead of 6x6. It is bounded by Downs Township on the east; Bloomington Township on the north; Funk's Grove Township on the west; and Wapella Township, in DeWitt County, on the south.

In 2024, Randolph Township officials are:

- , supervisor
- Stacy Shoemaker, town clerk
- , highway commissioner
- , assessor
- Town Trustees: James Lauterberg, Michael Girdler, Morgan Flubacker, Bryan Sheppard, Derek Struck, Adam Mowery
- Cemetery Trustees: Harold Necessary (president), Kurt Flora (secretary), Dan Billington
- Geoff Dodds, township attorney

== Geography ==
According to the 2010 census, the township has a total area of 49.62 square miles (128.5 km^{2}), of which 49.48 square miles (128.2 km^{2}) (or 99.72%) is land and 0.14 square miles (0.36 km^{2}) (or 0.28%) is water.

== Demographics ==
Historical population
Census	Pop.	Note	%±
2016 (est.)	4,413
U.S. Decennial Census
