= Pittsburg, Fayette County, Illinois =

Pittsburg, Illinois
- Unincorporated community
- Location within the state of Illinois
- Coordinates: 38°52′17″N 89°12′42″W
- Country: United States
- State: Illinois
- County: Fayette
- Township: Seminary
- Elevation: 531 ft (162 m)
- Time zone: UTC-6 (Central (CST))
  - Summer (DST): UTC-5 (CDT)
- GNIS feature ID: 415747

Pittsburg (also Halbsville) is an unincorporated community in Fayette County, Illinois, United States. Located at 38°52′17″N 89°12′42″W (38.8714354, -89.2117374), it lies at an elevation of 531 feet (162 m). It was named after the industrial heritage of Pittsburgh, Pennsylvania which, coincidentally, has a Fayette County, Pennsylvania as part of its metropolitan area.
