= Newtown Township, Livingston County, Illinois =

Coordinates: 41°03′50″N 88°45′45″W

Newtown Township
- Township
- Location in Livingston County

- Livingston County's location in Illinois
- Country: United States
- State: Illinois
- County: Livingston
- Established: November 3, 1857

Area
  - Total: 36.22 sq mi (93.8 km^{2})
  - Land: 35.96 sq mi (93.1 km^{2})
  - Water: 0.25 sq mi (0.65 km^{2}) 0.70%

Population (2020)
  - Total: 704
  - Density: 19.6/sq mi (7.56/km^{2})
- Time zone: UTC-6 (CST)
  - Summer (DST): UTC-5 (CDT)
- FIPS code: 17-105-52883

Newtown Township is located in Livingston County, Illinois. As of the 2020 census, its population was 704 and it contained 332 housing units.

== Geography ==
According to the 2021 census gazetteer files, Newtown Township has a total area of 36.22 square miles (93.81 km^{2}), of which 35.96 square miles (93.14 km^{2}) (or 99.30%) is land and 0.25 square miles (0.65 km^{2}) (or 0.70%) is water.

== Demographics ==
As of the 2020 census there were 704 people, 349 households, and 272 families residing in the township. The population density was 19.44 inhabitants per square mile (7.51/km^{2}). There were 332 housing units at an average density of 9.17 per square mile (3.54/km^{2}). The racial makeup of the township was 96.73% White, 0.00% African American, 0.00% Native American, 0.43% Asian, 0.00% Pacific Islander, 0.57% from other races, and 2.27% from two or more races. Hispanic or Latino of any race were 2.27% of the population.

There were 349 households, out of which 14.30% had children under the age of 18 living with them, 72.78% were married couples living together, 5.16% had a female householder with no spouse present, and 22.06% were non-families. 10.90% of all households were made up of individuals, and 0.00% had someone living alone who was 65 years of age or older. The average household size was 2.21 and the average family size was 2.43.

The township's age distribution consisted of 9.1% under the age of 18, 9.6% from 18 to 24, 13.7% from 25 to 44, 46.4% from 45 to 64, and 21.2% who were 65 years of age or older. The median age was 55.7 years. For every 100 females, there were 87.6 males. For every 100 females age 18 and over, there were 84.5 males.

The median income for a household in the township was $87,250, and the median income for a family was $87,857. Males had a median income of $65,962 versus $31,685 for females. The per capita income for the township was $37,765. About 7.7% of families and 9.7% of the population were below the poverty line, including 1.4% of those under age 18 and 26.2% of those age 65 or over.

Historical population
Census	Pop.	Note	%±
2010	733		—
2020	704		−4.0%
U.S. Decennial Census
