= Manville, Illinois =

- Unincorporated community
- Location within Illinois Location within the United States
- Coordinates: 41°03′18″N 88°45′58″W
- Country: United States
- State: Illinois
- County: Livingston
- Township: Newtown
- Elevation: 738 ft (225 m)

Population (2019)
  - Total: 5
- Time zone: UTC-6 (Central (CST))
  - Summer (DST): UTC-5 (CDT)
- ZIP code: 61313
- Area codes: 815 & 779
- GNIS feature ID: 412915

Manville is an unincorporated community in Newtown Township, Livingston County, Illinois, United States, about 5 miles (8.0 km) southeast of Streator.
