= Bald Mound, Illinois =

- Unincorporated community
- Location within Illinois Location within the United States
- Coordinates: 41°50′46″N 88°24′23″W
- Country: United States
- State: Illinois
- County: Kane
- Township: Blackberry
- Elevation: 735 ft (224 m)
- Time zone: UTC-6 (Central (CST))
  - Summer (DST): UTC-5 (CDT)
- Area code: 630
- GNIS feature ID: 403852

Bald Mound is an unincorporated community in Blackberry Township, Kane County, Illinois, United States, located at the junction of County Routes 10 and 78, 4.9 miles (7.9 km) west of Batavia. The Stearns-Wadsworth House, which is listed on the National Register of Historic Places, is located in Bald Mound.
