= Island Grove, Sangamon County, Illinois =

Island Grove, Illinois
- Unincorporated community
- Location within Illinois Location within the United States
- Coordinates: 39°43′27″N 89°57′39″W
- Country: United States
- State: Illinois
- County: Sangamon
- Township: New Berlin
- Elevation: 659 ft (201 m)
- Time zone: UTC-6 (Central (CST))
  - Summer (DST): UTC-5 (CDT)
- Area code: 217
- GNIS feature ID: 422842

Island Grove is an unincorporated community in New Berlin Township, Sangamon County, Illinois, United States. Island Grove is located on County Route 1613, (Old Route 36) 2.7 miles (4.3 km) west of New Berlin.
