= Riddle Hill, Illinois =

- Unincorporated community
- Location within Illinois Location within the United States
- Coordinates: 39°47′12″N 89°45′52″W
- Country: United States
- State: Illinois
- County: Sangamon
- Elevation: 610 ft (190 m)
- Time zone: UTC-6 (Central (CST))
  - Summer (DST): UTC-5 (CDT)
- Area code: 217
- GNIS feature ID: 416627

Riddle Hill is a rural unincorporated community located in Curran and Gardner townships, Sangamon County, Illinois. It lies at a crossroads located adjacent to where Old Jacksonville Road crosses Little Spring Creek, 6.5 miles west of Springfield.

== History ==
Old Jacksonville Road is one of the oldest roads in central Illinois; it is a traditional route between Jacksonville and the state capital, Springfield. Starting as early as the 1830s, travelers used the place where this road forded the creek as a campground, and the community grew from there.

On the night of September 28–29, 1838, participants in the 850-member Potawatomi Trail of Death encamped here on their forced march from Indiana to a portion of the unorganized western territory of the United States that would later be organized as Kansas Territory. A roadside historical marker has been erected on or near the site of their campground. The camping place is identified as 'McCoy's Mill', apparently recalling the name of a gristmill on Little Spring Creek at the ford.

On July 4, 1861, the 21st Illinois Volunteer Infantry Regiment, en route to service in the American Civil War, camped here for its first night in the field since mustering into federal service in Springfield. The new regiment's fledgling colonel, Ulysses S. Grant, issued his first written orders here. A historical marker in the yard of the New Salem Methodist Church commemorates the site of a now-vanished tree that marked the campsite.
