= Eagle Creek Township, Gallatin County, Illinois =

Eagle Creek Township
- Township
- Location in Gallatin County

- Gallatin County's location in Illinois
- Coordinates: 37°38′31″N 88°19′34″W
- Country: United States
- State: Illinois
- County: Gallatin
- Established: November 5, 1890

Area
  - Total: 37.24 sq mi (96.5 km^{2})
  - Land: 36.92 sq mi (95.6 km^{2})
  - Water: 0.32 sq mi (0.83 km^{2}) 0.86%
- Elevation: 367 ft (112 m)

Population (2020)
  - Total: 171
  - Density: 4.63/sq mi (1.79/km^{2})
- Time zone: UTC-6 (CST)
  - Summer (DST): UTC-5 (CDT)
- ZIP codes: 62931, 62934, 62954
- FIPS code: 17-059-21449

Eagle Creek Township is one of ten townships in Gallatin County, Illinois, USA. As of the 2020 census, its population was 171 and it contained 96 housing units.

== Geography ==
According to the 2021 census gazetteer files, Eagle Creek Township has a total area of 37.24 square miles (96.45 km^{2}), of which 36.92 square miles (95.62 km^{2}) (or 99.14%) is land and 0.32 square miles (0.83 km^{2}) (or 0.86%) is water.

=== Unincorporated towns ===
- Kedron at 37.665604°N 88.341430°W
- Leamington at 37.639493°N 88.306984°W

(This list is based on USGS data and may include former settlements.)

=== Cemeteries ===
The township contains these four cemeteries: Barnett, Hill, Leamington and Lloyd.

=== Major highways ===
- Illinois Route 1

=== Lakes ===
- Pounds Lake

== Demographics ==
As of the 2020 census there were 171 people, 115 households, and 63 families residing in the township. The population density was 4.59 inhabitants per square mile (1.77/km^{2}). There were 96 housing units at an average density of 2.58 per square mile (1.00/km^{2}). The racial makeup of the township was 97.66% White, 0.00% African American, 0.00% Native American, 0.00% Asian, 0.00% Pacific Islander, 0.00% from other races, and 2.34% from two or more races. Hispanic or Latino of any race were 1.17% of the population.

There were 115 households, out of which 40.00% had children under the age of 18 living with them, 14.78% were married couples living together, 40.00% had a female householder with no spouse present, and 45.22% were non-families. 45.20% of all households were made up of individuals, and 30.40% had someone living alone who was 65 years of age or older. The average household size was 1.63 and the average family size was 2.16.

The township's age distribution consisted of 31.9% under the age of 18, 0.0% from 18 to 24, 28.2% from 25 to 44, 13.8% from 45 to 64, and 26.1% who were 65 years of age or older. The median age was 28.7 years. For every 100 females, there were 46.9 males. For every 100 females age 18 and over, there were 88.2 males.

The median income for a household in the township was $8,139, and the median income for a family was $2,499. The per capita income for the township was $7,858. About 73.0% of families and 80.3% of the population were below the poverty line, including 100.0% of those under age 18 and 71.4% of those age 65 or over.

Historical population
Census	Pop.	Note	%±
2000	194		—
2010	187		−3.6%
2020	171		−8.6%
U.S. Decennial Census

== School districts ==
- Gallatin Community Unit School District 7

== Political districts ==
- Illinois' 19th congressional district
- State House District 118
- State Senate District 59
