= Bissell, Illinois =

- Unincorporated community
- Location within Illinois Location within the United States
- Coordinates: 39°50′46″N 89°34′54″W
- Country: United States
- State: Illinois
- County: Sangamon
- Elevation: 581 ft (177 m)
- Time zone: UTC-6 (Central (CST))
  - Summer (DST): UTC-5 (CDT)
- Area code: 217
- GNIS feature ID: 422468

Bissell is an unincorporated community in Clear Lake Township, Sangamon County, Illinois, United States. Bissell is located on Illinois Route 54 and the Canadian National Railway near the northeast border of Springfield.
