= Signal Hill, Illinois =

- Unincorporated community
- Location within Illinois
- Coordinates: 38°34′38″N 90°03′24″W
- Country: United States
- State: Illinois
- County: St. Clair
- Elevation: 587 ft (179 m)
- Time zone: UTC-6 (Central (CST))
  - Summer (DST): UTC-5 (CDT)
- Area code: 618
- GNIS feature ID: 426531

Signal Hill is an unincorporated community in Centreville Township, Stookey Township, and the city of Belleville, St. Clair County, Illinois, United States. Signal Hill is located on Illinois Route 157, approximately 11 miles (18 km) southeast of St. Louis, Missouri. Signal Hill dates back to 1904, during the Saint Louis World Fair, when the Signal Hill Park addition was platted. The tree-lined, island-separated boulevard is the centerpiece of the community filled with large, elegant homes dating to the creation of the community.

== Education ==
Students in the community attend Signal Hill School, comprising grades Pre-K to 8th grade, and Belleville West High School.

=== Public schools ===
- Signal Hill School District 181
- Belleville Township High School District 201
  - Belleville High School-West

=== Private schools ===
- Althoff Catholic High School
- Governor French Academy

=== Higher education ===
- Southern Illinois University Edwardsville
- Southwestern Illinois College

== Community Associations ==
Signal Hill is representative by two active neighborhood associations that liaison with local government officials, and help create public-private partnerships that enrich the community.

- Signal Hill Neighborhood Association
- The Top of the Hill Neighborhood Association
