= Nottingham Woods, Illinois =

- Unincorporated community
- Location within Illinois Location within the United States
- Coordinates: 41°49′47″N 88°27′55″W
- Country: United States
- State: Illinois
- County: Kane
- Township: Blackberry
- Elevation: 732 ft (223 m)
- Time zone: UTC-6 (Central (CST))
  - Summer (DST): UTC-5 (CDT)
- Area codes: 630 & 331
- GNIS feature ID: 414730

Nottingham Woods is an unincorporated community in Kane County, Illinois, United States, located on Illinois Route 47, 5 miles (8.0 km) north-northwest of Sugar Grove.
