= New Berlin Township, Sangamon County, Illinois =

Coordinates: 39°43′16″N 89°54′19″W

New Berlin Township
- Township
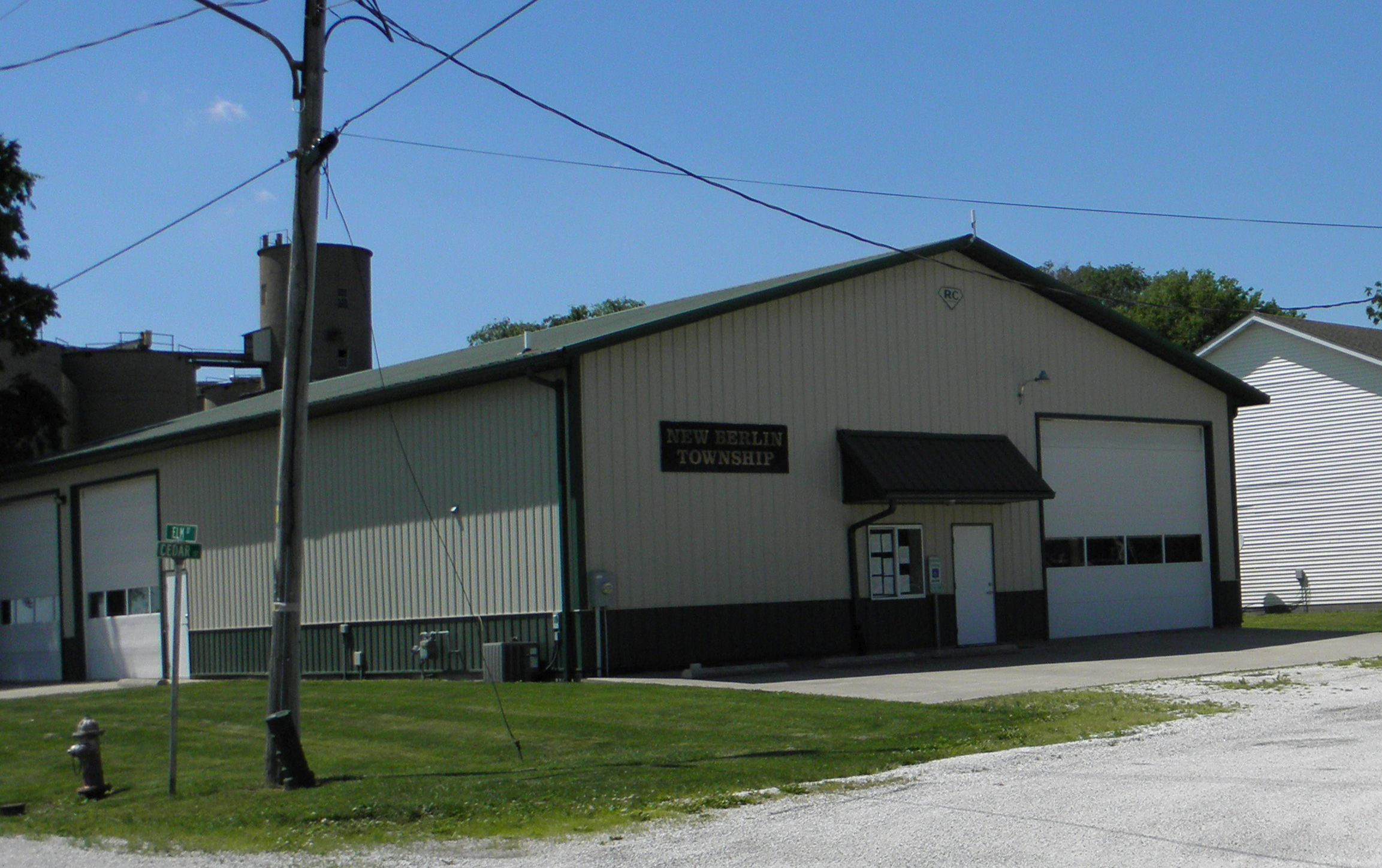
- New Berlin Township government building in New Berlin, Illinois

- Location in Sangamon County

- Sangamon County's location in Illinois
- Country: United States
- State: Illinois
- County: Sangamon
- Established: March 3, 1869

Area
  - Total: 31.22 sq mi (80.9 km^{2})
  - Land: 31.16 sq mi (80.7 km^{2})
  - Water: 0.06 sq mi (0.16 km^{2}) 0.19%

Population (2010)
  - Estimate (2016): 1,522
  - Density: 48.9/sq mi (18.9/km^{2})
- Time zone: UTC-6 (CST)
  - Summer (DST): UTC-5 (CDT)
- FIPS code: 17-167-52181

New Berlin Township is located in Sangamon County, Illinois. As of the 2010 census, its population was 1,524 and it contained 634 housing units. New Berlin Township was formed from a portion of Island Grove Township on March 3, 1869.

== Geography ==
According to the 2010 census, the township has a total area of 31.22 square miles (80.9 km^{2}), of which 31.16 square miles (80.7 km^{2}) (or 99.81%) is land and 0.06 square miles (0.16 km^{2}) (or 0.19%) is water.

== Government ==
The Township Hall is on South Cedar Street in New Berlin, IL. The Township Supervisor is Joseph Fromme. The Road District Highway Commissioner is David Kemp. The Township Clerk is Peggy Bloomfield.

== Demographics ==
Historical population
Census	Pop.	Note	%±
2016 (est.)	1,522
U.S. Decennial Census
