= Dale Township, McLean County, Illinois =

Coordinates: 40°26′33″N 89°06′04″W

Dale Township
- Township
- Location in McLean County

- McLean County's location in Illinois
- Country: United States
- State: Illinois
- County: McLean
- Established: November 3, 1857

Area
  - Total: 34.56 sq mi (89.5 km^{2})
  - Land: 34.56 sq mi (89.5 km^{2})
  - Water: 0.01 sq mi (0.026 km^{2}) 0.03%

Population (2010)
  - Estimate (2016): 1,223
  - Density: 35.7/sq mi (13.8/km^{2})
- Time zone: UTC-6 (CST)
  - Summer (DST): UTC-5 (CDT)
- FIPS code: 17-113-18381

Dale Township is located in McLean County, Illinois. As of the 2010 census, its population was 1,233 and it contained 521 housing units. It contains part of the census-designated place of Twin Grove and the entirety of Shirley.

== Geography ==
According to the 2010 census, the township has a total area of 34.56 square miles (89.5 km^{2}), of which 34.56 square miles (89.5 km^{2}) (or 100%) is land and 0.01 square miles (0.026 km^{2}) (or 0.03%) is water.

== Demographics ==
Historical population
Census	Pop.	Note	%±
2016 (est.)	1,223
U.S. Decennial Census
