= Shirley, Illinois =

- Census-designated place
- Location within Illinois Location within the United States
- Coordinates: 40°24′27″N 89°03′51″W
- Country: United States
- State: Illinois
- County: McLean
- Township: Dale
- Founded: 1854

Area
  - Total: 0.09 sq mi (0.23 km^{2})
  - Land: 0.09 sq mi (0.23 km^{2})
  - Water: 0.0 sq mi (0 km^{2})
- Elevation: 768 ft (234 m)

Population (2020)
  - Total: 135
  - Density: 1,500/sq mi (580/km^{2})
- Time zone: UTC-6 (CST)
  - Summer (DST): UTC-5 (CDT)
- ZIP Code: 61772
- Area code: 309
- GNIS ID: 2804092
- FIPS code: 17-69628

Shirley is an unincorporated community and census-designated place (CDP) in southwestern McLean County, Illinois, United States, just off Interstate 55. It was founded in 1854. As of the 2020 census, the population of the CDP was 135. Shirley is home to the Funk Prairie Home & Rock Museum.

== History ==
The town of Shirley was laid out on September 14, 1866, by John M. Foster (1806 – 1898). Foster was a native of New Hampshire. Before the village was established there was a switch at the location and a few lots had been platted. Foster built a brick house and store south of the railroad. The original town consisted of ten small blocks, mostly on the north side of the St. Louis Chicago and Alton Railroad. In 1874, Foster's home and a store and the station were on the south side of the tracks, and a warehouse and mill were on the north side. In 1895 there was a Methodist church, a Christian church, and a hotel north of the tracks; at that time were about twenty houses scattered on both sides of the railroad.

The Grassy Ridge Cemetery, located in Shirley, was notably frequented by alternative musician Silicon Monday during his time as a student at Illinois State University. Monday alludes to the location in the lyrics of “A Girl Named Mercy (The Mariposa Song)”.

== Demographics ==
Shirley first appeared as a census designated place in the 2020 U.S. census.

== Education ==
The school district is Heyworth Community Unit School District 4.
