= Coral, Illinois =

- Census-designated place
- Location within Illinois Location within the United States
- Coordinates: 42°13′05″N 88°33′58″W
- Country: United States
- State: Illinois
- County: McHenry
- Township: Coral

Area
  - Total: 0.039 sq mi (0.10 km^{2})
  - Land: 0.04 sq mi (0.10 km^{2})
  - Water: 0 sq mi (0.00 km^{2})
- Elevation: 919 ft (280 m)

Population (2020)
  - Total: 16
  - Density: 424.0/sq mi (163.72/km^{2})
- Time zone: UTC-6 (CST)
  - Summer (DST): UTC-5 (CDT)
- ZIP code: 60152
- FIPS code: 17-16301
- GNIS feature ID: 2806468

Coral is an Unincorporated community village and census-designated place in McHenry County, Illinois, United States. It was named a CDP before the 2020 census, at which time it had a population of 16.

== Geography ==
Coral is located at the intersections of US Highway 20 with East Coral Road and West Coral Road.

== Demographics ==
Historical population
Census	Pop.	Note	%±
2020	16		—
U.S. Decennial Census; 2020

Coral first appeared as a census designated place in the 2020 U.S. census.

=== 2020 census ===
Coral CDP, Illinois – Racial and ethnic composition Note: the US Census treats Hispanic/Latino as an ethnic category. This table excludes Latinos from the racial categories and assigns them to a separate category. Hispanics/Latinos may be of any race.
Race / Ethnicity (NH = Non-Hispanic)	Pop 2020	% 2020
White alone (NH)	10	62.50%
Black or African American alone (NH)	0	0.00%
Native American or Alaska Native alone (NH)	0	0.00%
Asian alone (NH)	0	0.00%
Native Hawaiian or Pacific Islander alone (NH)	0	0.00%
Other race alone (NH)	0	0.00%
Mixed race or Multiracial (NH)	0	0.00%
Hispanic or Latino (any race)	6	37.50%
Total	16	100.00%
