= Padua, Illinois =

- Unincorporated community
- Location within Illinois Location within the United States
- Coordinates: 40°27′01″N 88°45′50″W
- Country: United States
- State: Illinois
- County: McLean
- Elevation: 840 ft (260 m)
- Time zone: UTC-6 (Central (CST))
  - Summer (DST): UTC-5 (CDT)
- Area code: 309
- GNIS feature ID: 415295

Padua is a small unincorporated community in McLean County, Illinois, in the United States, with a population of about 525. Locals pronounce Padua as "pad-joo-way", rather than the traditional Italian pronunciation.
