= State Park Place, Illinois =

- Unincorporated community
- Location within Illinois Location within the United States
- Coordinates: 38°39′31″N 90°02′50″W
- Country: United States
- State: Illinois
- County: St. Clair and Madison
- Elevation: 420 ft (130 m)
- Time zone: UTC-6 (Central (CST))
  - Summer (DST): UTC-5 (CDT)
- Area code: 618
- GNIS feature ID: 426539

State Park Place is an unincorporated community in Madison and St. Clair counties, Illinois, United States. State Park Place borders Collinsville to the east and Cahokia Mounds State Historic Site to the west.
