= McCall, Illinois =

- Unincorporated community
- Location within Illinois Location within the United States
- Coordinates: 40°27′10″N 91°11′50″W
- Country: United States
- State: Illinois
- County: Hancock
- Elevation: 696 ft (212 m)
- Time zone: UTC-6 (Central (CST))
  - Summer (DST): UTC-5 (CDT)
- Area code: 217
- GNIS feature ID: 422958

McCall is an unincorporated community in Prairie Township, Hancock County, Illinois, United States. The community is located along County Route 26 4 miles (6.4 km) northwest of Carthage.
