= Fletcher, Illinois =

- Unincorporated community
- Location within Illinois Location within the United States
- Coordinates: 40°31′37″N 88°47′01″W
- Country: United States
- State: Illinois
- County: McLean
- Elevation: 814 ft (248 m)
- Time zone: UTC-6 (Central (CST))
  - Summer (DST): UTC-5 (CDT)
- Area code: 309
- GNIS feature ID: 422703

Fletcher (also Fletchers) is an unincorporated community in McLean County, Illinois, United States.
