= Winkel, Illinois =

- Unincorporated community
- Location within Illinois Location within the United States
- Coordinates: 40°20′56″N 89°37′53″W
- Country: United States
- State: Illinois
- County: Tazewell
- Elevation: 518 ft (158 m)
- Time zone: UTC-6 (Central (CST))
  - Summer (DST): UTC-5 (CDT)
- Area code: 309
- GNIS feature ID: 423322

Winkel is a former unincorporated community and rail stop in Tazewell County, Illinois, United States. It is located four miles southwest of Delavan.

Winkel was once a stop on the Gulf, Mobile and Ohio Railroad, and said to be the only community in Malone Township. It was settled in 1850.

The community was named for shopkeeper and postmaster Christian C. Winkel, Jr. A post office was opened in 1898.

In 1975, Winkel was the subject of a derisive newspaper article claiming the town was mysteriously called Winkel Winkel (due to a printing error on a 1973 map), and consisted of "a bad windmill and some farm structures." The article was panned by some readers as disrespectful.
