= McKeen, Illinois =

- Unincorporated community
- Location within Illinois Location within the United States
- Coordinates: 39°27′30″N 87°36′50″W
- Country: United States
- State: Illinois
- County: Clark
- Elevation: 584 ft (178 m)
- Time zone: UTC-6 (Central (CST))
  - Summer (DST): UTC-5 (CDT)
- Area code: 217
- GNIS feature ID: 413288

McKeen is an unincorporated community in Clark County, Illinois, United States. McKeen is located along a railroad line northeast of Marshall.

McKeen was platted in 1870 and was the site of a steam sawmill during the 1870s. By 1883, McKeen had a tile kiln, three stores, a Masonic Lodge, and about one hundred residents. The Grand Army of the Republic also had a post at McKeen at one time. Several homes remain at McKeen today.
