= Kingdom, Illinois =

- Unincorporated community
- Location within Illinois Location within the United States
- Coordinates: 41°53′37″N 89°23′37″W
- Country: United States
- State: Illinois
- County: Lee
- Township: Nachusa
- Elevation: 669 ft (204 m)
- Time zone: UTC-6 (Central (CST))
  - Summer (DST): UTC-5 (CDT)
- Area codes: 815 & 779
- GNIS feature ID: 411498

Kingdom is an unincorporated community in Lee County, Illinois, United States.
