= Bloomington Heights, Illinois =

Bloomington Heights
- Unincorporated community
- Location of Bloomington Heights within Illinois Bloomington Heights (the United States)
- Coordinates: 40°28′50″N 89°02′01″W
- Country: United States
- State: Illinois
- County: McLean
- Elevation: 784 ft (239 m)
- Time zone: UTC-6 (CST)
  - Summer (DST): UTC-5 (CDT)
- Postal code: 61701
- Area code: 309

Bloomington Heights is an unincorporated community in McLean County, Illinois. United States.
