= Osbernville, Illinois =

- Unincorporated community
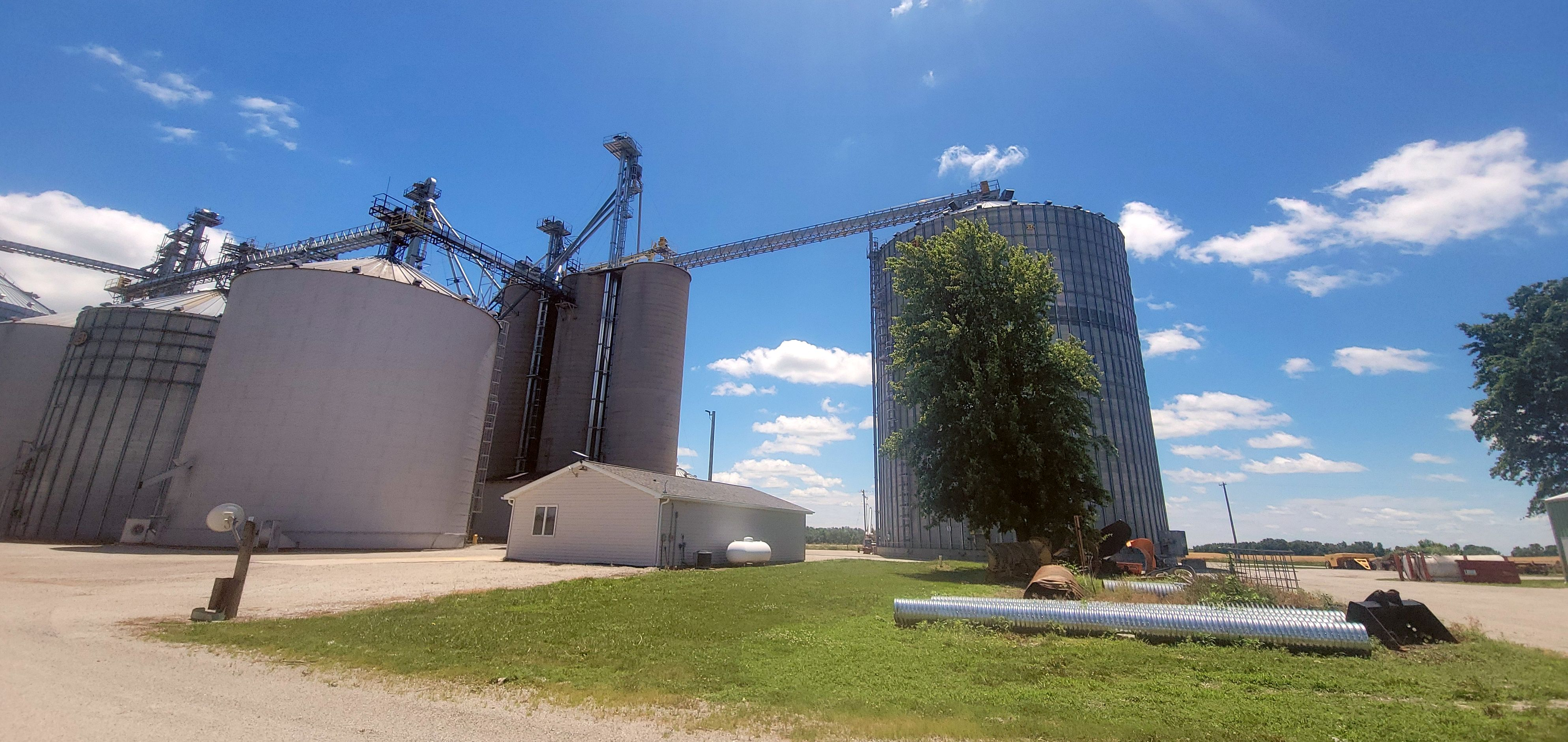
- Grain elevator at Osbernville

- Location within Illinois Location within the United States
- Coordinates: 39°45′40″N 89°10′43″W
- Country: United States
- State: Illinois
- County: Christian
- Township: Mosquito
- Elevation: 607 ft (185 m)
- Time zone: UTC-6 (Central (CST))
  - Summer (DST): UTC-5 (CDT)
- Area code: 217
- GNIS feature ID: 415189

Osbernville is an unincorporated community in Mosquito Township, Christian County, Illinois, United States. It lies at 39°45′40″N 89°10′43″W. It is named for Charley Osbern, the farmer on whose land it was laid out in the early 1900s.
