= Blackberry Township, Illinois =

Blackberry Township
- Township
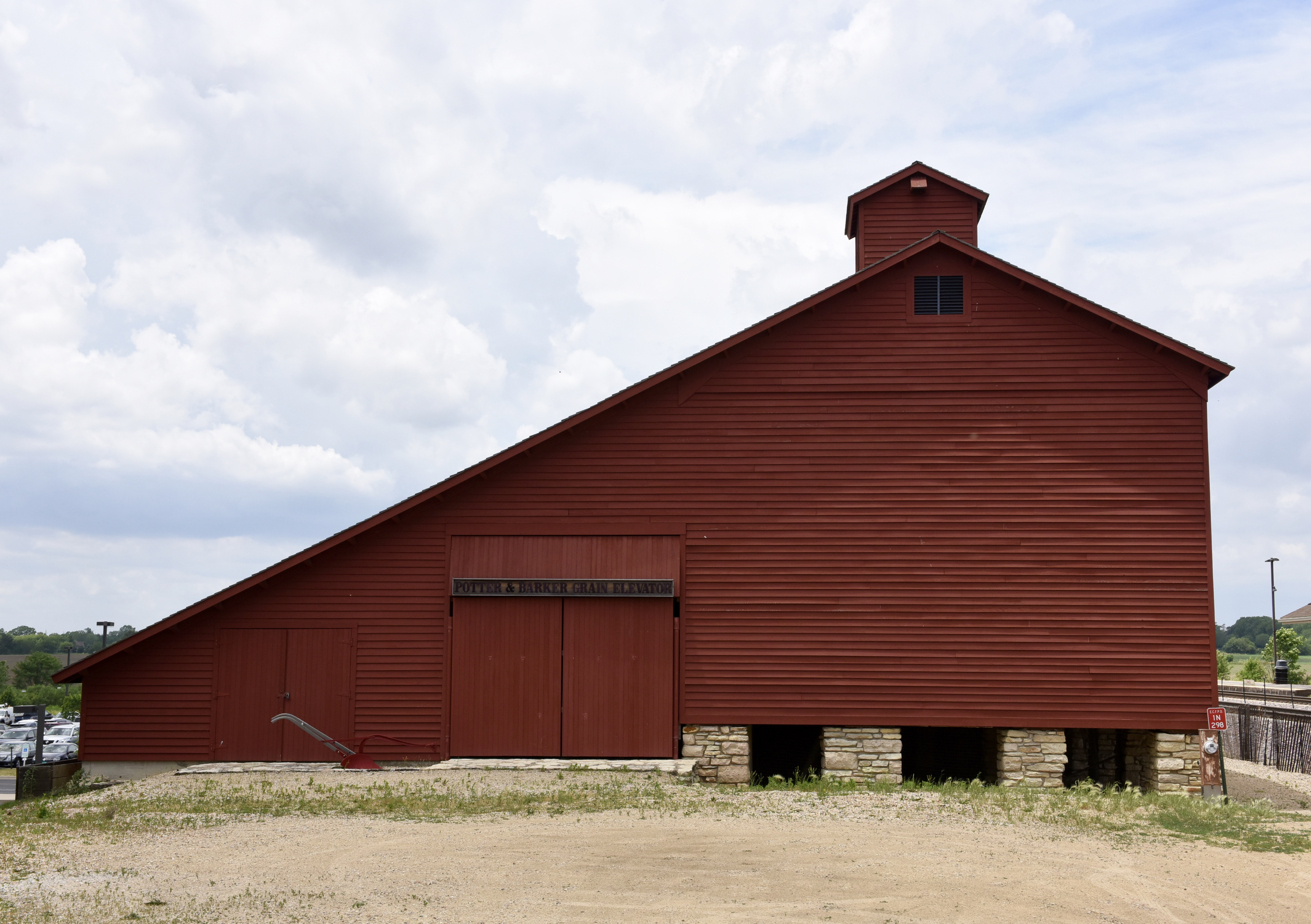
- Potter and Barker Grain Elevator in LaFox

- Location in Kane County

- Kane County's location in Illinois
- Coordinates: 41°51′12″N 088°25′53″W
- Country: United States
- State: Illinois
- County: Kane

Area
  - Total: 35.07 sq mi (90.8 km^{2})
  - Land: 34.92 sq mi (90.4 km^{2})
  - Water: 0.14 sq mi (0.36 km^{2}) 0.40%
- Elevation: 781 ft (238 m)

Population (2020)
  - Total: 17,329
  - Density: 496.2/sq mi (191.6/km^{2})
- ZIP Codes: 60119, 60134, 60510, 60542, 60554
- FIPS code: 17-089-06262
- GNIS feature ID: 0428677
- Website: www.blackberrytwpil.gov

Blackberry Township is located in Kane County, Illinois. As of the 2020 census, its population was 17,329 and it contained 5,962 housing units. Most of its land use is agricultural.

== Geography ==
The major part of the village of Elburn and portions of Batavia, Geneva, North Aurora, and Sugar Grove are located in Blackberry Township. The rest belongs to unincorporated Kane County. La Fox is a small unincorporated community in Blackberry Township on the Union Pacific West Metra line to Chicago.

According to the 2021 census gazetteer files, Blackberry Township has a total area of 35.07 square miles (90.83 km^{2}), of which 34.92 square miles (90.44 km^{2}) (or 99.60%) is land and 0.14 square miles (0.36 km^{2}) (or 0.40%) is water.

=== Cities, towns, villages ===
- Batavia (partial)
- Elburn (vast majority)
- Geneva (partial)
- North Aurora (partial)
- Sugar Grove (partial)

=== Unincorporated Towns ===
- Bald Mound
- La Fox
- Nottingham Woods
- Willow Creek
- Windenoak

== Demographics ==
As of the 2020 census there were 17,329 people, 5,222 households, and 4,403 families residing in the township. The population density was 494.18 inhabitants per square mile (190.80/km^{2}). There were 5,962 housing units at an average density of 170.02 per square mile (65.65/km^{2}). The racial makeup of the township was 86.09% White, 1.40% African American, 0.14% Native American, 3.41% Asian, 0.00% Pacific Islander, 1.85% from other races, and 7.12% from two or more races. Hispanic or Latino of any race were 7.56% of the population.

There were 5,222 households, out of which 43.20% had children under the age of 18 living with them, 70.30% were married couples living together, 7.70% had a female householder with no spouse present, and 15.68% were non-families. 11.30% of all households were made up of individuals, and 7.10% had someone living alone who was 65 years of age or older. The average household size was 2.99 and the average family size was 3.26.

The township's age distribution consisted of 29.1% under the age of 18, 7.6% from 18 to 24, 20.6% from 25 to 44, 31.5% from 45 to 64, and 11.1% who were 65 years of age or older. The median age was 40.6 years. For every 100 females, there were 107.1 males. For every 100 females age 18 and over, there were 99.5 males.

The median income for a household in the township was $137,316, and the median income for a family was $142,896. Males had a median income of $91,807 versus $45,242 for females. The per capita income for the township was $52,497. About 1.0% of families and 2.9% of the population were below the poverty line, including 3.6% of those under age 18 and 3.5% of those age 65 or over.

Historical population
Census	Pop.	Note	%±
2000	5,950		—
2010	15,090		153.6%
2020	17,329		14.8%
U.S. Decennial Census
