= Hallsville, Illinois =

- Unincorporated community
- Location within Illinois
- Coordinates: 40°09′03″N 89°05′34″W
- Country: United States
- State: Illinois
- County: DeWitt County
- Township: Barnett Township
- Elevation: 745 ft (227 m)
- ZIP code: 61727
- GNIS feature ID: 0409674

Hallsville is an unincorporated community in Barnett Township, DeWitt County, Illinois, United States.

== Geography ==
Hallsville is located at 40°09′03″N 89°05′34″W at an elevation of 745 feet.
