= Midland City, Illinois =

- Unincorporated community
- Location within Illinois
- Coordinates: 40°08′43″N 89°08′01″W
- Country: United States
- State: Illinois
- County: DeWitt County
- Township: Barnett Township
- Elevation: 650 ft (200 m)
- ZIP code: 61727
- GNIS feature ID: 0413515

Midland City is an unincorporated community in Barnett Township, DeWitt County, Illinois, United States.

== Geography ==
Midland City is located at 40°08′43″N 89°08′01″W at an elevation of 650 feet.
