= Tipton, Champaign County, Illinois =

Tipton, Illinois
- Unincorporated community
- Location within Illinois Location within the United States
- Coordinates: 40°04′11″N 88°02′06″W
- Country: United States
- State: Illinois
- County: Champaign
- Elevation: 676 ft (206 m)
- Time zone: UTC-6 (Central (CST))
  - Summer (DST): UTC-5 (CDT)
- Area code: 217
- GNIS feature ID: 423244

Tipton is an unincorporated community in Champaign County, Illinois, United States. Tipton is located along a railroad line south of St. Joseph.

Tipton is said to have been named after Tip Peters, who was a local farmer and lived next to the railroad tracks on his farm.

The Peters-Thompson Cemetery is a small cemetery in the corner of a farm field and contains some of the original settlers of this area.
