= Sutter, Tazewell County, Illinois =

Sutter, Illinois
- Unincorporated community
- Location within Illinois Location within the United States
- Coordinates: 40°23′48″N 89°22′10″W
- Country: United States
- State: Illinois
- County: Tazewell
- Elevation: 656 ft (200 m)
- Time zone: UTC-6 (Central (CST))
  - Summer (DST): UTC-5 (CDT)
- Area code: 309
- GNIS feature ID: 423225

Sutter is an unincorporated community in Tazewell County, Illinois, United States. Sutter is southeast of Hopedale. Sutter formerly was a station on the Illinois Terminal Railroad interurban system.
