= Gilchrist, Mercer County, Illinois =

Gilchrist, Illinois
- Unincorporated community
- Location within Illinois Location within the United States
- Coordinates: 41°12′19″N 90°37′27″W
- Country: United States
- State: Illinois
- County: Mercer
- Elevation: 787 ft (240 m)
- Time zone: UTC-6 (Central (CST))
  - Summer (DST): UTC-5 (CDT)
- Area code: 309
- GNIS feature ID: 416190

Gilchrist is an unincorporated community in Greene Township, Mercer County, Illinois, United States. Gilchrist is 2 miles (3.2 km) west of Viola.

Gilchrist was founded by John W. Gilchrist. The town was home to as many as 300 miners employed in the nearby Empire Coal Mine, owned by Mr. Gilchrist and other members of the Gilchrist family. In 1914, Gilchrist had a population of 100. Its mail came from Viola. The business establishments are: the Empire Coal Company, a general store, a grocery store owned by F. A. Essley, and a restaurant owned by J. H. Smith.

Gilchrist was on the Chicago, Burlington and Quincy Railroad branch line (originally the American Central Railway) that ran from Galva, through Viola to New Boston. Later, Gilchrist served as the junction of the Chicago, Burlington, and Quincy Railroad with the Northern Division of the Rock Island Southern Railway, arriving in Gilchrist in 1905.

A branch of the Rock Island Southern was built from Gilchrist to Aledo in 1910. The line to Gilchrist was abandoned in 1952.

Service over the Chicago, Burlington, and Quincy to Gilchrist ended in 1986, and the rail was removed in 1988.
