= Barnes, Illinois =

- Unincorporated community
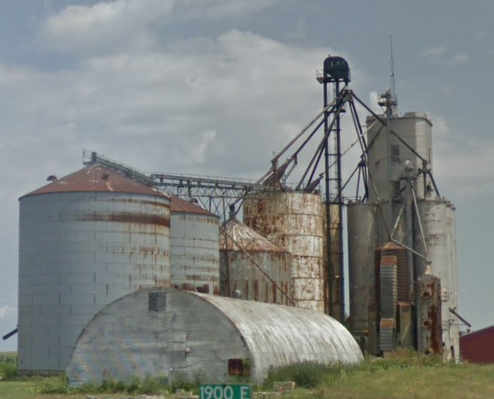
- The last remaining elevator in Barnes

- Location within Illinois Location within the United States
- Coordinates: 40°30′10″N 88°54′06″W
- Country: United States
- State: Illinois
- County: McLean
- Elevation: 853 ft (260 m)
- Time zone: UTC-6 (Central (CST))
  - Summer (DST): UTC-5 (CDT)
- Area code: 309
- GNIS feature ID: 422432

Barnes is an unincorporated community in McLean County, Illinois.

== History ==
Calvin Barnes founded the community in the 1880s, originally naming it "Barnesville." Barnes' home was the first structure built, followed by a grain elevator. Barnes had a post office open in 1884 that lasted until 1919. Walter and Alta Weber opened a general store in 1921. The small community was laid out along the Illinois Central, northeast of Bloomington-Normal. Hopeful planning resulted in four streets and over 20 commercial lots. However, the population never even grew to double digits. Only a few of the elevator structures remain.
