= West Township, McLean County, Illinois =

West Township
- Township
- Location in McLean County

- McLean County's location in Illinois
- Coordinates: 40°20′24″N 88°37′59″W
- Country: United States
- State: Illinois
- County: McLean
- Established: May 17, 1858

Area
  - Total: 48.6 sq mi (126 km^{2})
  - Land: 48.59 sq mi (125.8 km^{2})
  - Water: 0.01 sq mi (0.026 km^{2}) 0.02%

Population (2010)
  - Estimate (2016): 214
  - Density: 4.4/sq mi (1.7/km^{2})
- Time zone: UTC-6 (CST)
  - Summer (DST): UTC-5 (CDT)
- FIPS code: 17-113-79904

West Township is located in McLean County, Illinois. As of the 2010 census, its population was 216 and it contained 94 housing units. West Township changed its name from Kickapoo Township on May 17, 1858.

== Geography ==
According to the 2010 census, the township has a total area of 48.6 square miles (126 km^{2}), of which 48.59 square miles (125.8 km^{2}) (or 99.98%) is land and 0.01 square miles (0.026 km^{2}) (or 0.02%) is water.

== Demographics ==
Historical population
Census	Pop.	Note	%±
2026 (est.)	223
U.S. Decennial Census
