= Eppards Point Township, Livingston County, Illinois =

Coordinates: 40°48′01″N 88°38′28″W

Eppards Point Township
- Township
- Location in Livingston County

- Livingston County's location in Illinois
- Country: United States
- State: Illinois
- County: Livingston
- Established: November 3, 1857

Area
  - Total: 36.48 sq mi (94.5 km^{2})
  - Land: 36.09 sq mi (93.5 km^{2})
  - Water: 0.39 sq mi (1.0 km^{2}) 1.07%

Population (2020)
  - Total: 366
  - Density: 10.1/sq mi (3.92/km^{2})
- Time zone: UTC-6 (CST)
  - Summer (DST): UTC-5 (CDT)
- FIPS code: 17-105-24309

Eppards Point Township is located in Livingston County, Illinois. As of the 2020 census, its population was 366 and it contained 138 housing units.

== Geography ==
According to the 2021 census gazetteer files, Eppards Point Township has a total area of 36.48 square miles (94.48 km^{2}), of which 36.09 square miles (93.47 km^{2}) (or 98.93%) is land and 0.39 square miles (1.01 km^{2}) (or 1.07%) is water.

== Demographics ==
As of the 2020 census there were 366 people, 172 households, and 141 families residing in the township. The population density was 10.03 inhabitants per square mile (3.87/km^{2}). There were 138 housing units at an average density of 3.78 per square mile (1.46/km^{2}). The racial makeup of the township was 95.63% White, 0.82% African American, 0.00% Native American, 0.55% Asian, 0.00% Pacific Islander, 0.55% from other races, and 2.46% from two or more races. Hispanic or Latino of any race were 2.73% of the population.

There were 172 households, out of which 18.00% had children under the age of 18 living with them, 54.65% were married couples living together, 27.33% had a female householder with no spouse present, and 18.02% were non-families. 18.00% of all households were made up of individuals, and 8.70% had someone living alone who was 65 years of age or older. The average household size was 2.22 and the average family size was 2.48.

The township's age distribution consisted of 10.0% under the age of 18, 3.9% from 18 to 24, 22.3% from 25 to 44, 47.3% from 45 to 64, and 16.5% who were 65 years of age or older. The median age was 54.7 years. For every 100 females, there were 59.4 males. For every 100 females age 18 and over, there were 70.6 males.

The median income for a household in the township was $93,182, and the median income for a family was $94,356. Males had a median income of $64,917 versus $32,500 for females. The per capita income for the township was $43,051.None of the population was below the poverty line.

Historical population
Census	Pop.	Note	%±
2010	427		—
2020	366		−14.3%
U.S. Decennial Census
