= 2023 Robinson–Sullivan tornado =

2023 EF3 tornado in the midwestern US

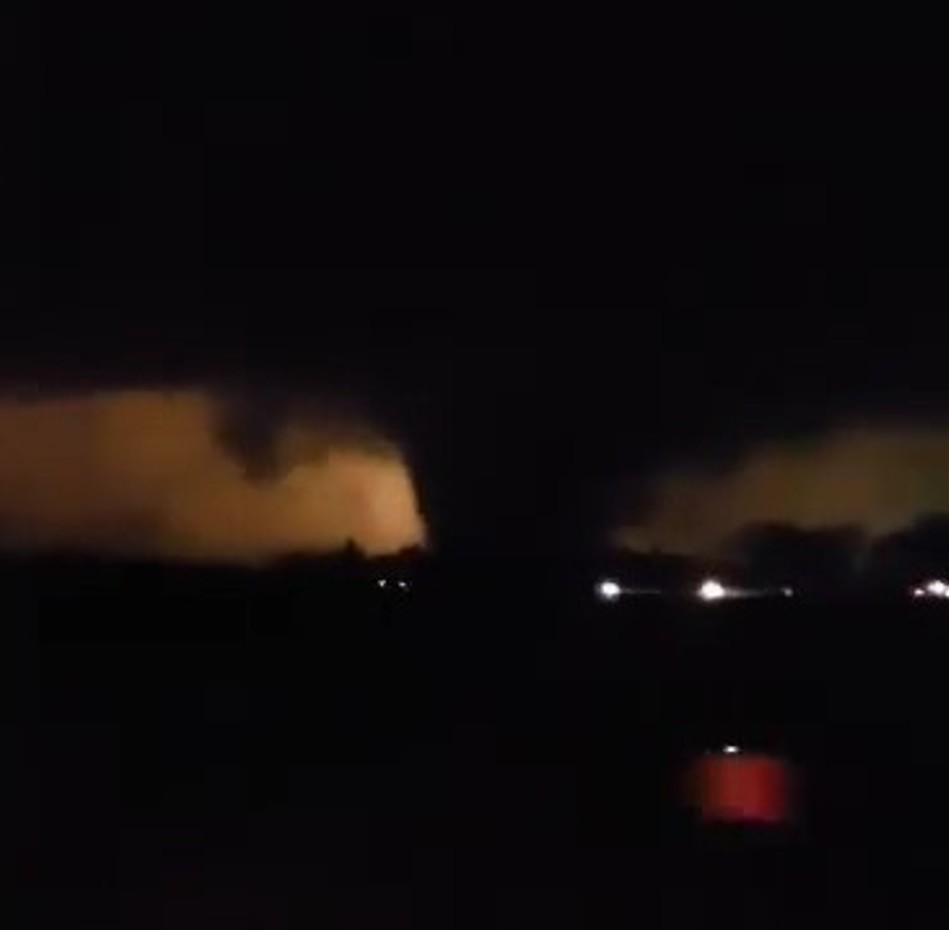
- The tornado as it struck Robinson at high-end EF3 strength.

Meteorological history
- Formed: March 31, 2023, 8:58 p.m. CDT (UTC−05:00)
- Dissipated: March 31, 2023, 10:33 p.m. EDT (UTC−04:00)
- Duration: 35 minutes

EF3 tornado
- on the Enhanced Fujita scale
- Max width: 660 yards (600 m)
- Path length: 40.86 mi (65.76 km)
- Highest winds: 165 mph (266 km/h)

Overall effects
- Fatalities: 6
- Injuries: 16
- Damage: ≥$18.160 million (2023 USD)
- Part of the Tornado outbreak of March 31 – April 1, 2023 and Tornadoes of 2023

In the evening hours of March 31, 2023, an intense, long-tracked tornado struck multiple communities in Illinois and Indiana, killing or injuring multiple people and leaving a 40.86-mile (65.76 km) path of destruction in its wake. The tornado caused major damage at the southern and eastern edges of Robinson, Illinois, and later crossed into Indiana and devastated the town of Sullivan, Indiana. The tornado caused damage rated at high-end EF3 on the Enhanced Fujita scale in both Illinois and Indiana, killed a total of 6 people, and injured 16 others. Three of the fatalities occurred in Robinson, while the other three occurred in Sullivan.

The tornado touched down near Ste. Marie before intensifying as it moved to the east at a rapid pace. As the tornado neared Robinson, it picked up and tossed a 1,000-U.S.-gallon (3,800 L) propane tank while retaining EF3 intensity. A tornado emergency was issued for Robinson as it approached the south side of town; three people were killed in the area as the tornado moved past. Heavy damage was observed in Robinson, and the tornado left the town devastated. The tornado crossed the Wabash River into Indiana, tracking towards Sullivan. The tornado then struck the southern edge of the town minutes later, killing a further three people and producing EF3-rated damage to residential buildings. The tornado dissipated to the east of Sullivan, tracking a total of 40.86-mile (65.76 km) over a span of thirty-five minutes.

== Meteorological synopsis ==
An extratropical cyclone developed over Nebraska on the morning of March 31. As a result, meteorologists expected a storm mode of discrete supercells to develop. This, along with the presence of even stronger CAPE values and a more unstable environment across Illinois and eastern Missouri, led to the SPC "bridging" the two main moderate risk areas and giving a 15% hatched risk for significant tornadoes at their 1300 UTC outlook. The surrounding area, which extended into central portions of Kentucky and Tennessee, extreme southwestern Indiana, and northwestern Alabama, was given a 10% hatched risk for tornadoes. Additionally, a large 30% partially hatched contour for damaging wind gusts (with a smaller 45% risk in the northern part of the risk), and large hail were also added in this new outlook.

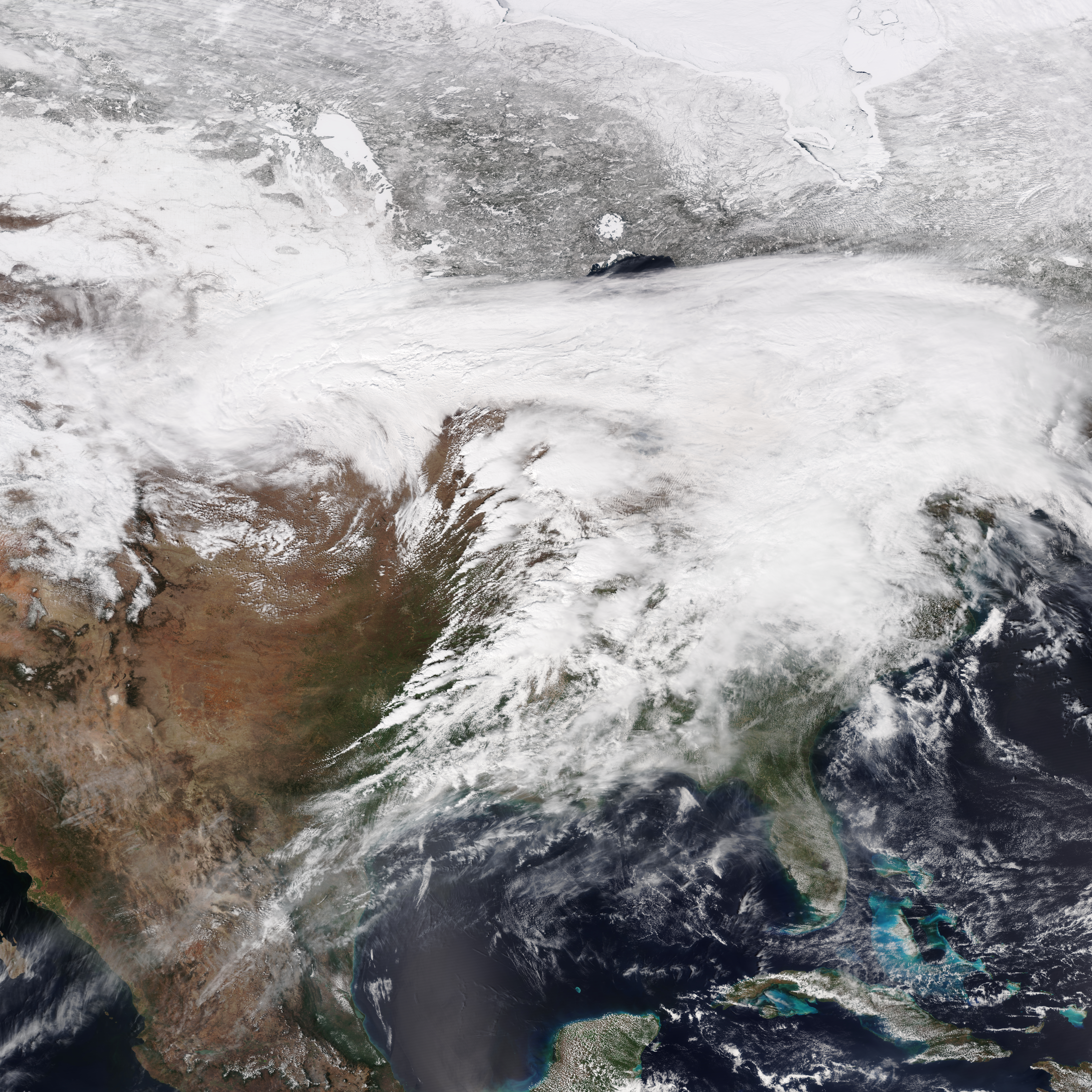
The storm system that was responsible for the tornado outbreak, seen earlier on March 31

With increased confidence of favorable parameters for severe weather, the SPC upped the threat for strong tornadoes even further, introducing two tornado-driven high risk areas in their 16:30 UTC outlook. The first high risk area covered southeastern Iowa, northwestern Illinois, and far northeastern Missouri, while the second included eastern Arkansas, southwestern Tennessee, and northern Mississippi. These two distinct areas were given a 30% hatched risk for tornadoes, given the extremely favorable environment for the development and sustainment of discrete supercells with strong to violent tornado potential. The northern high-risk area was expected to see an arcing band of quasi-discrete supercells that initially produced large hail before becoming tornadic with the possibility of producing several long-track strong to potentially violent tornadoes. Supercells were scattered, but longer tracked within the southern high-risk area with multiple rounds of tornadic storms capable of producing long-lived strong to violent tornadoes expected. The large area surrounding and connecting the two high risk areas maintained a moderate risk, with an accompanying 15% hatched risk for tornadoes, as supercells that could develop in this environment could similarly sustain and rotate, although storm coverage was expected to be somewhat lower, and the environment was not as favorable.

Widespread wind damage and several weak tornado touchdowns were reported in the Chicago metropolitan area. Additionally, an organizing cluster of severe storms with embedded supercells orientated from southwest to northeast continued to produce tornadoes, some of which were strong, as they moved northeastward through eastern Illinois into western Indiana, which prompted yet another tornado emergency as it impacted the outskirts of Robinson, Illinois, before crossing into Indiana and striking Sullivan, Indiana.

== Tornado summary ==
=== Illinois ===
The tornado emergency that was issued by the National Weather Service as the tornado approached Robinson at EF3 intensity.

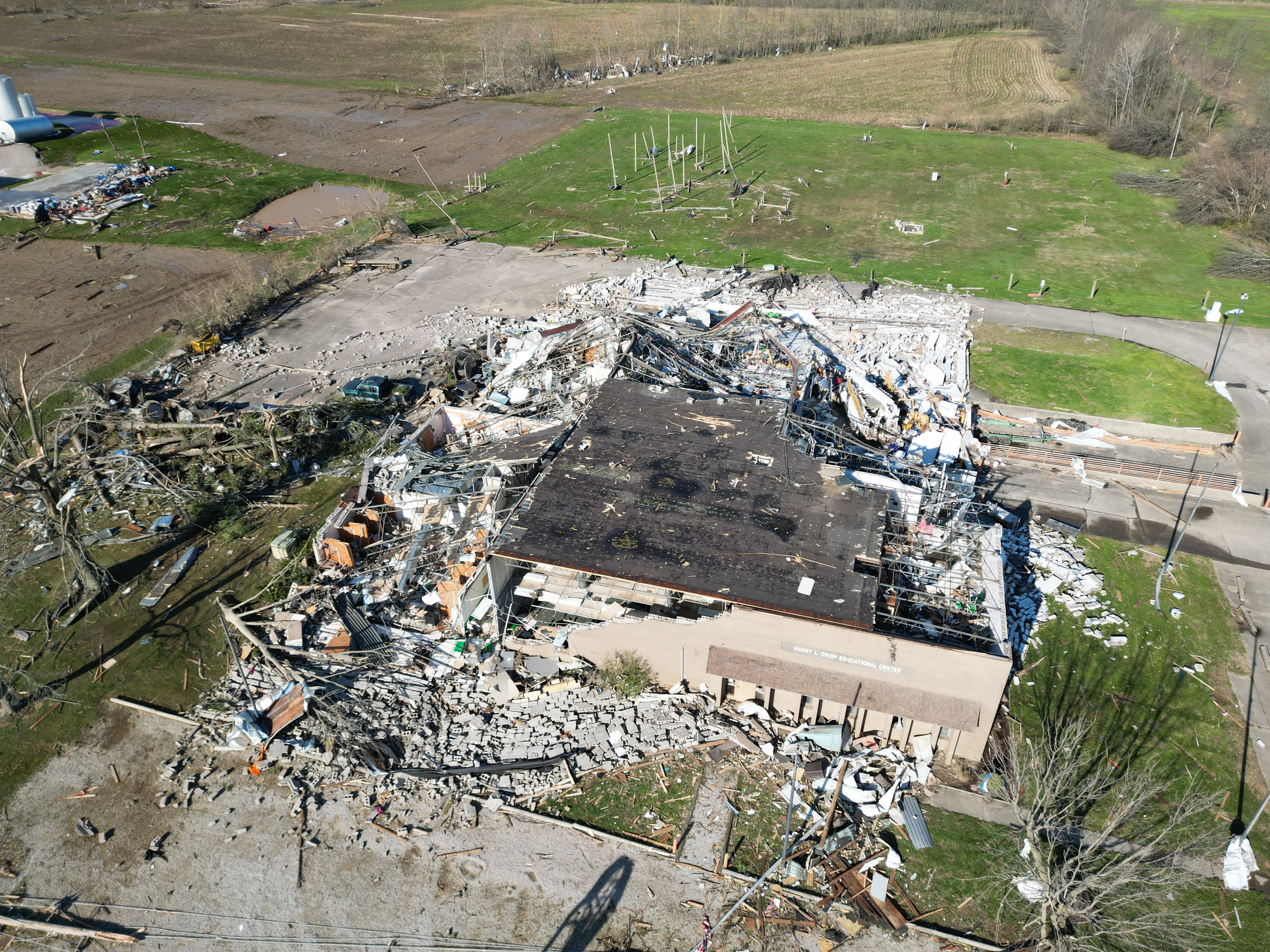
Damage to a college building in Robinson.

The tornado first touched down along County Highway 16 southwest of Ste. Marie in Jasper County, Illinois, and moved east-northeastward, causing sporadic EF0 tree damage. The tornado began to strengthen after it crossed into Crawford County, inflicting EF1 to EF2 damage. As it passed near Pierceburg, the tornado collapsed the roof structure of a machine shed, snapped wooden power poles, and sheared off the tops of trees. Northeast of there along County Highway 15, EF1 to EF2 damage continued to occur as two homes suffered major roof damage, with one of them having a portion of its roof uplifted. A nearby mobile home was torn in half with its debris strewn about 20 yards (18 m) in opposite directions, and additional trees had their tops sheared off. Past this area, the tornado threw a semi-trailer into a large machine shed, destroying it. Debris from the machine shed impacted an old, poorly anchored home, which had its exterior walls removed. The tornado strengthened further as it moved south of Stoy and Oil Center and through rural areas to the northeast, causing major EF2 to high-end EF3 damage. Damage survey teams initially had difficulty accessing this area due to flooding and utility roadblocks, but the area was eventually surveyed via the use of drone video and satellite imagery.

Aerial video showed major impacts to several rural homes and farmsteads in this area, as multiple houses, barns, and outbuildings were destroyed with debris scattered long distances across fields. Several people were left trapped under debris in basements and had to be rescued, some mobile homes were obliterated, and many large trees were snapped. A large 1,000 gallon propane tank was also thrown out into a farm field, and aerial imagery revealed ground scouring along this segment of the path. As the tornado continued to the northeast, the presence of a large debris ball on radar prompted the issuance of a tornado emergency for Robinson as the tornado approached the south side of town.

Track map of the tornado as it moved through the eastern fringes of Robinson and areas just south of Gordon. (Note: Color-coded triangles indicate damage at a given location. The orange line indicates the approximate path of the tornado.) Key EF0 65–85 mph EF1 86–110 mph EF2 111–135 mph EF3 136–165 mph

Moving into the southern fringes of Robinson, the tornado maintained EF2 to EF3 strength as it continued northeastward, completely destroying two mobile homes along County Highway 9, killing one person in each structure. Several other nearby homes sustained significant damage, and a large but poorly anchored two-story house near North While Tail Hollow was almost completely leveled at high-end EF3 intensity, leaving only one wall standing. Numerous trees and power poles were snapped in this area as well. Maintaining EF2 to EF3 intensity, the tornado then narrowly missed the Marathon Petroleum Oil Refinery just southeast of Robinson, obliterating several manufactured homes and outbuildings, partially destroying a frame home, and inflicting roof damage to other homes. Large trees were snapped and partially debarked in this area, and additional ground scouring was observed. It then impacted the eastern outskirts of Robinson near Gordon at high-end EF3 intensity, causing a fatality when it destroyed the H. L. Crisp Educational Center along IL 1. The two-story masonry building had most of its upper floor destroyed, while multiple walls collapsed on the first floor. Additional EF2 to high-end EF3 damage occurred nearby as a couple of homes and vehicles were destroyed.

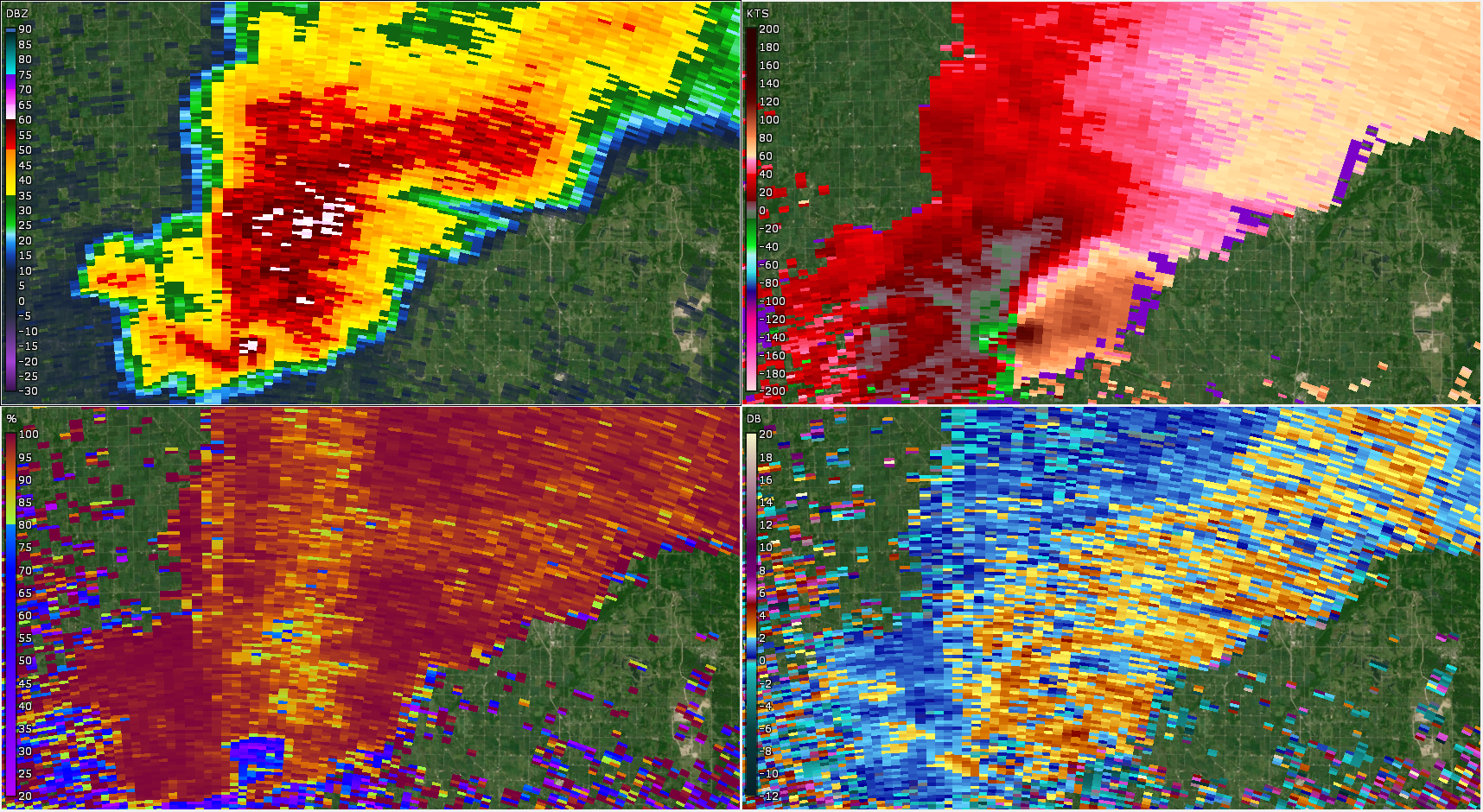
NEXRAD radar scan of the tornado as it moved through rural areas west of Sullivan.

One poorly anchored house was leveled at this location, and major damage to trees and power poles was observed. After causing EF2 damage to homes and trees as it crossed over IL 33, the tornado struck the Robinson Municipal Airport at high-end EF3 intensity. Multiple metal airplane hangars, which had rigid steel beam frames measuring greater than 18 inches (46 cm) in diameter, were completely destroyed, including some that were entirely swept away. Multiple airplanes and several vehicles were thrown and destroyed, an outbuilding structure was also demolished, and extensive damage to utility poles and a few homes occurred in this area. Several tractor-trailers and pieces of farm machinery were thrown and piled on top of one another as well. The tornado then weakened, but remained strong, causing a continuous path of EF1 to EF2 damage as it crossed County Highway 5 north of Palestine. Multiple homes had large sections of their roof structures removed, and large machine sheds suffered wall damage along this segment of the damage path. Heavy tree damage and some ground scouring was also observed as the tornado approached the Wabash River.

=== Indiana ===
Track map of the tornado as it moved through Sullivan. Key EF0 65–85 mph EF1 86–110 mph EF2 111–135 mph EF3 136–165 mph

The tornado then crossed the Wabash River into Sullivan County, Indiana, just north of Riverton, maintaining high-end EF1 to EF2 strength as it passed to the south of Merom. Several barns and outbuildings were completely demolished, farming equipment was tossed around, a residence sustained roof damage, and numerous large trees and power poles were snapped. The tornado continued to intensify as it passed through rural areas to the northwest of New Lebanon, where four metal truss electrical transmission towers were collapsed at EF3 intensity. EF2 to EF3 damage continued as the tornado moved to the northeast and approached the town of Sullivan. Just southwest of the town, three poorly anchored homes were severely damaged or destroyed, and a modular home was thrown at least 200 yards (180 m) and destroyed, killing the two occupants. A large trailer and several cars in this area were also thrown, outbuildings were obliterated, and hundreds of trees were snapped. Crossing US 150/US 41 into the southern part of Sullivan, the tornado inflicted widespread EF2 to EF3 damage, with many homes and other structures being severely damaged or destroyed. Numerous homes in town sustained total loss of their roofs and exterior walls, and several poorly anchored homes were swept from their foundations and completely destroyed, with debris strewn throughout residential areas.

A few businesses, a VFW hall, a metal shop building, and several outbuilding structures were also destroyed in this area. A food pantry was damaged as well, and major tree damage occurred throughout the south side of town. Intensifying further to high-end EF3 strength, the tornado crossed East Center Road at the southeast edge of town, where several poorly anchored homes were swept away and destroyed, including one modular home that was thrown at least 150 yards (140 m), killing one of the occupants while injuring the other. A few other homes sustained roof and exterior wall loss and multiple vehicles were tossed, one of which was thrown 300 feet (91 m). The tornado then quickly weakened as it exited Sullivan and continued to the east-northeast, overturning a dump truck and damaging trees in wooded areas before dissipating to the east of the town. Damage along this final portion of the path was rated EF0 to EF1.

The tornado had a total path length of 40.86 miles (65.76 km) and reached a peak width of 660 yards (600 m). It caused six fatalities, and injured 16 other people.

== Aftermath ==
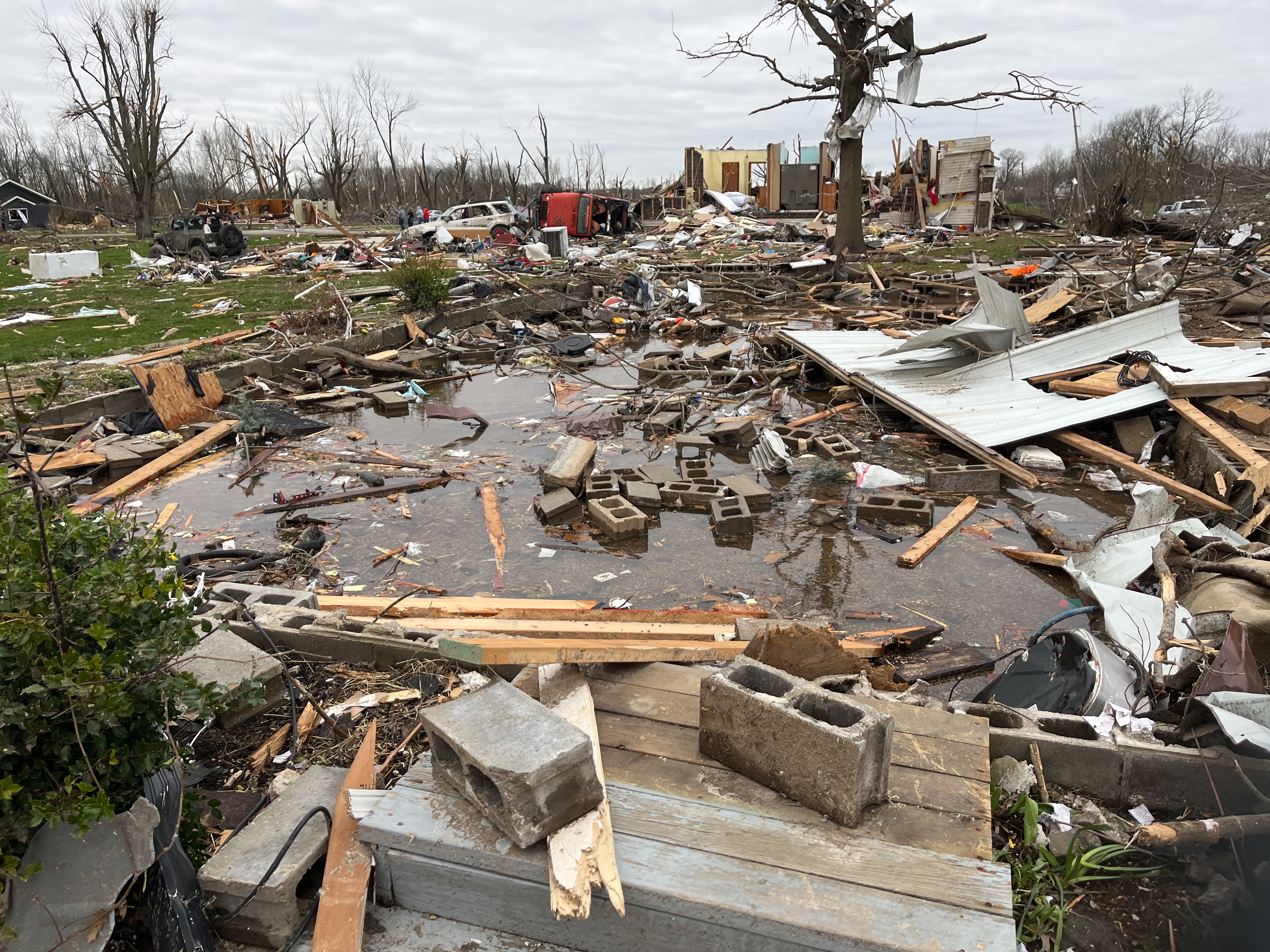
EF3 damage to a poorly-anchored block foundation home in Sullivan.

=== Damage and subsequent recovery efforts ===
The tornado damaged or destroyed approximately 240 businesses in the southern Sullivan area, where EF3-rated damage was observed. Trees in the area were also snapped at a height of 30 feet (9.1 m) off of the ground; Mayor of Sullivan Clint Lamb stated that "It's devastating... It's like a war zone". As a result, the Sullivan County Long-Term Recovery Coalition (SCLTRC) was established by Sullivan County authorities, whose aim was to help with recovery efforts in the aftermath of the tornado and other storms that moved through the county on March 31. As of December 2024, the SCLTRC has aided with the rebuilding of fifteen homes in the Sullivan area, and has assisted with the renovations of a further twenty-five homes. Indiana governor Eric Holcomb declared Sullivan and Johnson counties as disaster areas the day after the tornado, on April 1. Recovery crews were also deployed to Sullivan County the same day.

In November 2023, weather enthusiasts alerted the National Weather Service that the agency missed a portion of the tornado's track while conducting a tornado damage survey; the areas in question were initially inaccessible due to flooding and blocked roads. A re-evaluation of the damage using satellite imagery and drone footage resulted in the wind speeds being upgraded to 165 mph (266 km/h) (although the EF3 rating was kept) and an increase in width to 0.66 mi (1.06 km).

=== Fatalities ===
Six people were killed by the tornado, three in Illinois, and a further three of whom were residing in Sullivan at the time of the tornado. Two people were killed in the same home and were related, while the third fatality occurred in a mobile home that was destroyed.

Name	Age	Location of death	State	County	City	Refs.
Susan Key Horton	61	Permanent home	Indiana	Sullivan County	Sullivan	
Thomas Randall Horton	38	Permanent home	Indiana	Sullivan County	Sullivan	
Shane Steven Goodman	47	Mobile home	Indiana	Sullivan County	Sullivan	
Unknown	40	Permanent home	Illinois	Crawford County	Robinson	
Unknown	50	Permanent home	Illinois	Crawford County	Robinson	
Unknown	69	Permanent home	Illinois	Crawford County	Robinson	

== See also ==
- List of United States tornado emergencies
- Weather of 2023
- 2023 Rolling Fork–Silver City tornado – an EF4 tornado that hit Mississippi a week earlier

== Notes and footnotes ==
=== Sources ===
- National Weather Service (2023). "Storm Events Database: Sullivan EF3 tornado". National Weather Service.
