= Montgomery Township, Crawford County, Illinois =

Montgomery Township
- Township
- Location in Crawford County

- Crawford County's location in Illinois
- Coordinates: 38°54′35″N 87°35′55″W
- Country: United States
- State: Illinois
- County: Crawford
- Established: June 21, 1869

Area
  - Total: 54.49 sq mi (141.1 km^{2})
  - Land: 54.04 sq mi (140.0 km^{2})
  - Water: 0.45 sq mi (1.2 km^{2}) 0.83%
- Elevation: 564 ft (172 m)

Population (2020)
  - Total: 671
  - Density: 12.4/sq mi (4.79/km^{2})
- Time zone: UTC-6 (CST)
  - Summer (DST): UTC-5 (CDT)
- ZIP codes: 62427, 62451, 62454
- FIPS code: 17-033-50205

Montgomery Township is one of ten townships in Crawford County, Illinois, USA. As of the 2020 census, its population was 671 and it contained 289 housing units.

== Geography ==
According to the 2021 census gazetteer files, Montgomery Township has a total area of 54.49 square miles (141.13 km^{2}), of which 54.04 square miles (139.96 km^{2}) (or 99.17%) is land and 0.45 square miles (1.17 km^{2}) (or 0.83%) is water. The Wabash River defines its eastern border.

=== Cities, towns, villages ===
- Flat Rock (east quarter)

=== Unincorporated towns ===
- Crawfordsville
- Heathsville
- Morea
- Oil Grove

(This list is based on USGS data and may include former settlements.)

=== Cemeteries ===
The township contains these twenty-three cemeteries: Allen, Baker, Bartmess, Bennett, Dickerson, Ferrell, Ford, Fuller, Ganies, Green, Green Hill, Hale, Higgins, Johnson, Lackey, Maddox, Morea, Norton, Pleasant View, Seaney, Shaw, Tobey and Wesley Chapel.

=== Major highways ===
- Illinois Route 33

== Demographics ==
As of the 2020 census there were 671 people, 376 households, and 154 families residing in the township. The population density was 12.31 inhabitants per square mile (4.75/km^{2}). There were 289 housing units at an average density of 5.30 per square mile (2.05/km^{2}). The racial makeup of the township was 96.13% White, 0.60% African American, 0.00% Native American, 0.00% Asian, 0.00% Pacific Islander, 0.15% from other races, and 3.13% from two or more races. Hispanic or Latino of any race were 1.04% of the population.

There were 376 households, out of which 12.80% had children under the age of 18 living with them, 28.72% were married couples living together, 7.18% had a female householder with no spouse present, and 59.04% were non-families. 59.00% of all households were made up of individuals, and 40.40% had someone living alone who was 65 years of age or older. The average household size was 1.64 and the average family size was 2.46.

The township's age distribution consisted of 13.9% under the age of 18, 5.8% from 18 to 24, 11.1% from 25 to 44, 31% from 45 to 64, and 38.1% who were 65 years of age or older. The median age was 59.0 years. For every 100 females, there were 101.6 males. For every 100 females age 18 and over, there were 101.1 males.

The median income for a household in the township was $58,429, and the median income for a family was $68,500. Males had a median income of $42,045 versus $17,500 for females. The per capita income for the township was $35,160. About 3.9% of families and 12.0% of the population were below the poverty line, including none of those under age 18 and 23.4% of those age 65 or over.

Historical population
Census	Pop.	Note	%±
1930	1,461		—
1940	1,337		−8.5%
1950	1,134		−15.2%
1960	1,174		3.5%
1970	758		−35.4%
1980	791		4.4%
1990	676		−14.5%
2000	736		8.9%
2010	672		−8.7%
2020	671		−0.1%
U.S. Decennial Census

== School districts ==
- Lawrence County Community Unit School District 20
- Palestine Community Unit School District 3
- Robinson Community Unit School District 2

== Political districts ==
- Illinois's 15th congressional district
- State House District 109
- State Senate District 55
