= Martin Township, Crawford County, Illinois =

Martin Township
- Township
- Location in Crawford County

- Crawford County's location in Illinois
- Coordinates: 38°54′39″N 87°51′54″W
- Country: United States
- State: Illinois
- County: Crawford
- Established: June 21, 1869

Area
  - Total: 42.62 sq mi (110.4 km^{2})
  - Land: 42.61 sq mi (110.4 km^{2})
  - Water: 0.02 sq mi (0.052 km^{2}) 0.04%
- Elevation: 466 ft (142 m)

Population (2020)
  - Total: 504
  - Density: 11.8/sq mi (4.57/km^{2})
- Time zone: UTC-6 (CST)
  - Summer (DST): UTC-5 (CDT)
- ZIP codes: 62421, 62427, 62449, 62454, 62466
- FIPS code: 17-033-47202

Martin Township is one of ten townships in Crawford County, Illinois, United States. As of the 2020 census, its population was 504 and it contained 233 housing units.

== Geography ==
According to the 2021 census gazetteer files, Martin Township has a total area of 42.62 square miles (110.39 km^{2}), of which 42.61 square miles (110.36 km^{2}) (or 99.96%) is land and 0.02 square miles (0.05 km^{2}) (or 0.04%) is water.

=== Unincorporated towns ===
- Green Brier
- Hardinville
- Pierceburg

(This list is based on USGS data and may include former settlements.)

=== Cemeteries ===
The township contains these five cemeteries: Berlin, Hardinville, Jones, Prior Grove and Richart.

== Demographics ==
As of the 2020 census there were 504 people, 162 households, and 85 families residing in the township. The population density was 11.82 inhabitants per square mile (4.56/km^{2}). There were 233 housing units at an average density of 5.47 per square mile (2.11/km^{2}). The racial makeup of the township was 94.25% White, 0.00% African American, 0.20% Native American, 0.20% Asian, 0.00% Pacific Islander, 0.20% from other races, and 5.16% from two or more races. Hispanic or Latino of any race were 0.40% of the population.

There were 162 households, out of which 16.70% had children under the age of 18 living with them, 52.47% were married couples living together, none had a female householder with no spouse present, and 47.53% were non-families. 47.50% of all households were made up of individuals, and 15.40% had someone living alone who was 65 years of age or older. The average household size was 1.96 and the average family size was 2.84.

The township's age distribution consisted of 18.6% under the age of 18, none from 18 to 24, 31.5% from 25 to 44, 25.5% from 45 to 64, and 24.5% who were 65 years of age or older. The median age was 46.5 years. For every 100 females, there were 110.6 males. For every 100 females age 18 and over, there were 108.9 males.

The median income for a household in the township was $55,000, and the median income for a family was $66,750. Males had a median income of $67,083 versus $40,729 for females. The per capita income for the township was $28,337. About 14.1% of families and 20.1% of the population were below the poverty line, including 20.3% of those under age 18 and 32.1% of those age 65 or over.

Historical population
Census	Pop.	Note	%±
1930	1,163		—
1940	1,270		9.2%
1950	1,015		−20.1%
1960	825		−18.7%
1970	685		−17.0%
1980	669		−2.3%
1990	606		−9.4%
2000	607		0.2%
2010	531		−12.5%
2020	504		−5.1%
U.S. Decennial Census

== School districts ==
- Oblong Community Unit School District 4
- Red Hill Community Unit School District 10
- Robinson Community Unit School District 2

== Political districts ==
- Illinois' 15th congressional district
- State House District 109
- State Senate District 55
