= Honey Creek Township, Crawford County, Illinois =

Honey Creek Township
- Township
- Location in Crawford County

- Crawford County's location in Illinois
- Coordinates: 38°54′11″N 87°43′43″W
- Country: United States
- State: Illinois
- County: Crawford
- Established: June 21, 1869

Area
  - Total: 48.32 sq mi (125.1 km^{2})
  - Land: 48.32 sq mi (125.1 km^{2})
  - Water: 0 sq mi (0 km^{2}) 0%
- Elevation: 581 ft (177 m)

Population (2020)
  - Total: 1,435
  - Density: 29.70/sq mi (11.47/km^{2})
- Time zone: UTC-6 (CST)
  - Summer (DST): UTC-5 (CDT)
- ZIP codes: 62427, 62454
- FIPS code: 17-033-35970

Honey Creek Township is one of ten townships in Crawford County, Illinois, USA. As of the 2020 census, its population was 1,435 and it contained 643 housing units.

== Geography ==
According to the 2010 census, the township has a total area of 48.32 square miles (125.1 km^{2}), all land.

=== Cities, towns, villages ===
- Flat Rock (west three-quarters)

=== Unincorporated towns ===
- Duncanville
- New Hebron
- Port Jackson
- Villas

(This list is based on USGS data and may include former settlements.)

=== Cemeteries ===
The township contains these ten cemeteries: Beckwith, Cecedar, Good Hope, Jones, Nuttle, Port Jackson, Rich, Sears, Swearingen, Tohill, and Updike.

=== Major highways ===
- Illinois Route 1

== Demographics ==
As of the 2020 census there were 1,435 people, 727 households, and 560 families residing in the township. The population density was 29.70 inhabitants per square mile (11.47/km^{2}). There were 643 housing units at an average density of 13.31 per square mile (5.14/km^{2}). The racial makeup of the township was 96.10% White, 0.07% African American, 0.21% Native American, 0.35% Asian, 0.00% Pacific Islander, 0.49% from other races, and 2.79% from two or more races. Hispanic or Latino of any race were 0.63% of the population.

There were 727 households, out of which 41.00% had children under the age of 18 living with them, 75.52% were married couples living together, 1.38% had a female householder with no spouse present, and 22.97% were non-families. 20.10% of all households were made up of individuals, and 8.40% had someone living alone who was 65 years of age or older. The average household size was 2.49 and the average family size was 2.88.

The township's age distribution consisted of 25.2% under the age of 18, 6.1% from 18 to 24, 27.3% from 25 to 44, 27.5% from 45 to 64, and 13.9% who were 65 years of age or older. The median age was 38.7 years. For every 100 females, there were 79.5 males. For every 100 females age 18 and over, there were 95.9 males.

The median income for a household in the township was $67,159, and the median income for a family was $91,071. Males had a median income of $61,250 versus $31,500 for females. The per capita income for the township was $30,293. About 3.8% of families and 6.6% of the population were below the poverty line, including 2.9% of those under age 18 and 5.6% of those age 65 or over.

Historical population
Census	Pop.	Note	%±
1930	1,922		—
1940	1,901		−1.1%
1950	1,695		−10.8%
1960	1,245		−26.5%
1970	1,365		9.6%
1980	1,476		8.1%
1990	1,497		1.4%
2000	1,566		4.6%
2010	1,563		−0.2%
2020	1,435		−8.2%
U.S. Decennial Census

== School districts ==
- Lawrence County Community Unit School District 20
- Oblong Community Unit School District 4
- Palestine Community Unit School District 3
- Robinson Community Unit School District 2

== Political districts ==
- Illinois' 15th congressional district
- State House District 109
- State Senate District 55
