= Sainte Marie Township, Jasper County, Illinois =

Sainte Marie Township
- Township
- Location in Jasper County

- Jasper County's location in Illinois
- Coordinates: 38°56′00″N 88°02′00″W
- Country: United States
- State: Illinois
- County: Jasper
- Established: November 8, 1859

Area
  - Total: 43.43 sq mi (112.5 km^{2})
  - Land: 42.32 sq mi (109.6 km^{2})
  - Water: 0.11 sq mi (0.28 km^{2}) 0.26%
- Elevation: 479 ft (146 m)

Population (2020)
  - Total: 510
  - Density: 12/sq mi (4.7/km^{2})
- Time zone: UTC-6 (CST)
  - Summer (DST): UTC-5 (CDT)
- ZIP codes: 62448, 62449, 62459, 62475, 62480
- GNIS feature ID: 0422229
- FIPS code: 17-079-66803

Sainte Marie Township is one of eleven townships in Jasper County, Illinois, United States. As of the 2020 census, its population was 510 and it contained 251 housing units.

== Geography ==
According to the 2021 census gazetteer files, Ste. Marie Township has a total area of 43.43 square miles (112.48 km^{2}), of which 43.32 square miles (112.20 km^{2}) (or 99.74%) is land and 0.11 square miles (0.28 km^{2}) (or 0.26%) is water.

=== Cities, towns, villages ===
- Ste. Marie
- Rafetown

=== Adjacent townships ===
- Willow Hill Township - north
- Oblong Township, Crawford County - northeast
- Martin Township, Crawford County - east
- Southwest Township, Crawford County - east
- German Township, Richland County - south
- Preston Township, Richland County - southwest
- Fox Township - west

=== Cemeteries ===
- St. Mary's Assumption
- Collins/Faltmier
- Ste Marie City
- St. Valentine/South Bend
- Yager

=== Rivers ===
- Dead River
- Embarras River

== Demographics ==
As of the 2020 census there were 510 people, 199 households, and 144 families residing in the township. The population density was 11.74 inhabitants per square mile (4.53/km^{2}). There were 251 housing units at an average density of 5.78 per square mile (2.23/km^{2}). The racial makeup of the township was 97.65% White, 0.00% African American, 0.78% Native American, 0.39% Asian, 0.00% Pacific Islander, 0.20% from other races, and 0.98% from two or more races. Hispanic or Latino of any race were 0.78% of the population.

There were 199 households, out of which 32.20% had children under the age of 18 living with them, 53.27% were married couples living together, 11.56% had a female householder with no spouse present, and 27.64% were non-families. 21.60% of all households were made up of individuals, and 10.60% had someone living alone who was 65 years of age or older. The average household size was 3.16 and the average family size was 3.76.

The township's age distribution consisted of 34.7% under the age of 18, 4.8% from 18 to 24, 28.3% from 25 to 44, 19.9% from 45 to 64, and 12.4% who were 65 years of age or older. The median age was 31.3 years. For every 100 females, there were 81.8 males. For every 100 females age 18 and over, there were 98.6 males.

The median income for a household in the township was $69,205, and the median income for a family was $73,611. Males had a median income of $56,625 versus $29,167 for females. The per capita income for the township was $25,046. About 5.6% of families and 9.2% of the population were below the poverty line, including 8.7% of those under age 18 and 1.3% of those age 65 or over.

Historical population
| Census | Pop. | Note | %± |
|---|---|---|---|
| 2000 | 620 | | — |
| 2010 | 551 | | −11.1% |
| 2020 | 510 | | −7.4% |

== School districts ==
- Jasper County Community Unit School District 1
- Oblong Community Unit School District 4

== Political districts ==
- Illinois's 19th congressional district
- State House District 108
- State Senate District 54
