= Crawfordsville, Illinois =

- Ghost town
- Location within Illinois
- Coordinates: 38°52′00″N 87°40′10″W
- Country: United States
- State: Illinois
- County: Crawford
- Elevation: 446 ft (136 m)
- GNIS feature ID: 1807711

Crawfordsville is a ghost town in Crawford County, Illinois, United States. Crawfordsville was 2.5 miles (4.0 km) south of Flat Rock, and about the same distance north of Birds. The townsite lies on both sides of the dividing line between Honey Creek Township and Montgomery Township.
