= Prairie Township, Crawford County, Illinois =

Prairie Township
- Township
- Location in Crawford County

- Crawford County's location in Illinois
- Coordinates: 39°07′15″N 87°47′30″W
- Country: United States
- State: Illinois
- County: Crawford
- Established: November 5, 1867

Area
  - Total: 40.94 sq mi (106.0 km^{2})
  - Land: 40.80 sq mi (105.7 km^{2})
  - Water: 0.14 sq mi (0.36 km^{2}) 0.35%
- Elevation: 551 ft (168 m)

Population (2020)
  - Total: 620
  - Density: 15/sq mi (5.9/km^{2})
- Time zone: UTC-6 (CST)
  - Summer (DST): UTC-5 (CDT)
- ZIP codes: 62413, 62433, 62442, 62454, 62478
- FIPS code: 17-033-61470

Prairie Township is one of ten townships in Crawford County, Illinois, USA. As of the 2020 census, its population was 620 and it contained 275 housing units.

== Geography ==
According to the 2021 census gazetteer files, Prairie Township has a total area of 40.94 square miles (106.03 km^{2}), of which 40.80 square miles (105.67 km^{2}) (or 99.65%) is land and 0.14 square miles (0.36 km^{2}) (or 0.35%) is water.

=== Unincorporated towns ===
- Annapolis
- Porterville

(This list is based on USGS data and may include former settlements.)

=== Cemeteries ===
The township contains these five cemeteries: Cox, Dix, Eaton, Mount Pleasant and Stanfield.

== Demographics ==
As of the 2020 census there were 620 people, 165 households, and 76 families residing in the township. The population density was 15.14 inhabitants per square mile (5.85/km^{2}). There were 275 housing units at an average density of 6.72 per square mile (2.59/km^{2}). The racial makeup of the township was 97.26% White, 0.16% African American, 0.16% Native American, 0.81% Asian, 0.00% Pacific Islander, 0.32% from other races, and 1.29% from two or more races. Hispanic or Latino of any race were 1.29% of the population.

There were 165 households, out of which 9.10% had children under the age of 18 living with them, 43.64% were married couples living together, 2.42% had a female householder with no spouse present, and 53.94% were non-families. 49.10% of all households were made up of individuals, and 38.20% had someone living alone who was 65 years of age or older. The average household size was 1.82 and the average family size was 2.70.

The township's age distribution consisted of 12.0% under the age of 18, none from 18 to 24, 10.8% from 25 to 44, 42.6% from 45 to 64, and 34.7% who were 65 years of age or older. The median age was 61.1 years. For every 100 females, there were 66.8 males. For every 100 females age 18 and over, there were 59.4 males.

The median income for a household in the township was $46,438, and the median income for a family was $92,813. Males had a median income of $51,375 versus $36,875 for females. The per capita income for the township was $32,834. None of the population was below the poverty line.

Historical population
Census	Pop.	Note	%±
1930	1,027		—
1940	1,066		3.8%
1950	924		−13.3%
1960	780		−15.6%
1970	678		−13.1%
1980	782		15.3%
1990	594		−24.0%
2000	631		6.2%
2010	594		−5.9%
2020	620		4.4%
U.S. Decennial Census

== School districts ==
- Hutsonville Community Unit School District 1
- Robinson Community Unit School District 2

== Political districts ==
- Illinois' 15th congressional district
- State House District 109
- State Senate District 55
