= Oblong Township, Crawford County, Illinois =

Oblong Township
- Township
- Location in Crawford County

- Crawford County's location in Illinois
- Coordinates: 39°00′28″N 87°52′52″W
- Country: United States
- State: Illinois
- County: Crawford
- Established: November 5, 1867

Area
  - Total: 57.43 sq mi (148.7 km^{2})
  - Land: 57.40 sq mi (148.7 km^{2})
  - Water: 0.03 sq mi (0.078 km^{2}) 0.06%
- Elevation: 490 ft (150 m)

Population (2020)
  - Total: 2,762
  - Density: 48.12/sq mi (18.58/km^{2})
- Time zone: UTC-6 (CST)
  - Summer (DST): UTC-5 (CDT)
- ZIP codes: 62449, 62454
- FIPS code: 17-033-55119

Oblong Township is one of ten townships in Crawford County, Illinois, USA. As of the 2020 census, its population was 2,726 and it contained 1,227 housing units.

== Geography ==
According to the 2021 census gazetteer files, Oblong Township has a total area of 57.43 square miles (148.74 km^{2}), of which 57.40 square miles (148.67 km^{2}) (or 99.94%) is land and 0.03 square miles (0.08 km^{2}) (or 0.06%) is water.

=== Cities, towns, villages ===
- Oblong
- Stoy

=== Unincorporated towns ===
- Dogwood
- Oil Center

(This list is based on USGS data and may include former settlements.)

=== Cemeteries ===
The township contains these three cemeteries: Oblong, Prier and White Oak.

=== Major highways ===
- Illinois Route 33

=== Lakes ===
- Oblong Lake

=== Landmarks ===
- Oblong Park

== Demographics ==
As of the 2020 census there were 2,762 people, 1,215 households, and 836 families residing in the township. The population density was 48.09 inhabitants per square mile (18.57/km^{2}). There were 1,227 housing units at an average density of 21.36 per square mile (8.25/km^{2}). The racial makeup of the township was 94.75% White, 1.27% African American, 0.18% Native American, 0.25% Asian, 0.04% Pacific Islander, 0.43% from other races, and 3.08% from two or more races. Hispanic or Latino of any race were 1.05% of the population.

There were 1,215 households, out of which 34.70% had children under the age of 18 living with them, 55.72% were married couples living together, 8.81% had a female householder with no spouse present, and 31.19% were non-families. 23.00% of all households were made up of individuals, and 9.70% had someone living alone who was 65 years of age or older. The average household size was 2.08 and the average family size was 2.42.

The township's age distribution consisted of 20.7% under the age of 18, 7.4% from 18 to 24, 25.6% from 25 to 44, 26.6% from 45 to 64, and 19.9% who were 65 years of age or older. The median age was 42.2 years. For every 100 females, there were 97.6 males. For every 100 females age 18 and over, there were 88.3 males.

The median income for a household in the township was $51,221, and the median income for a family was $55,652. Males had a median income of $37,569 versus $22,944 for females. The per capita income for the township was $27,579. About 7.9% of families and 14.2% of the population were below the poverty line, including 12.7% of those under age 18 and 10.1% of those age 65 or over.

Historical population
Census	Pop.	Note	%±
1930	3,301		—
1940	3,126		−5.3%
1950	3,234		3.5%
1960	3,236		0.1%
1970	3,124		−3.5%
1980	3,222		3.1%
1990	2,974		−7.7%
2000	2,918		−1.9%
2010	2,789		−4.4%
2020	2,762		−1.0%
U.S. Decennial Census

== School districts ==
- Oblong Community Unit School District 4
- Robinson Community Unit School District 2

== Political districts ==
- Illinois's 15th congressional district
- State House District 109
- State Senate District 55
