= Lamotte Township, Crawford County, Illinois =

Lamotte Township
- Township
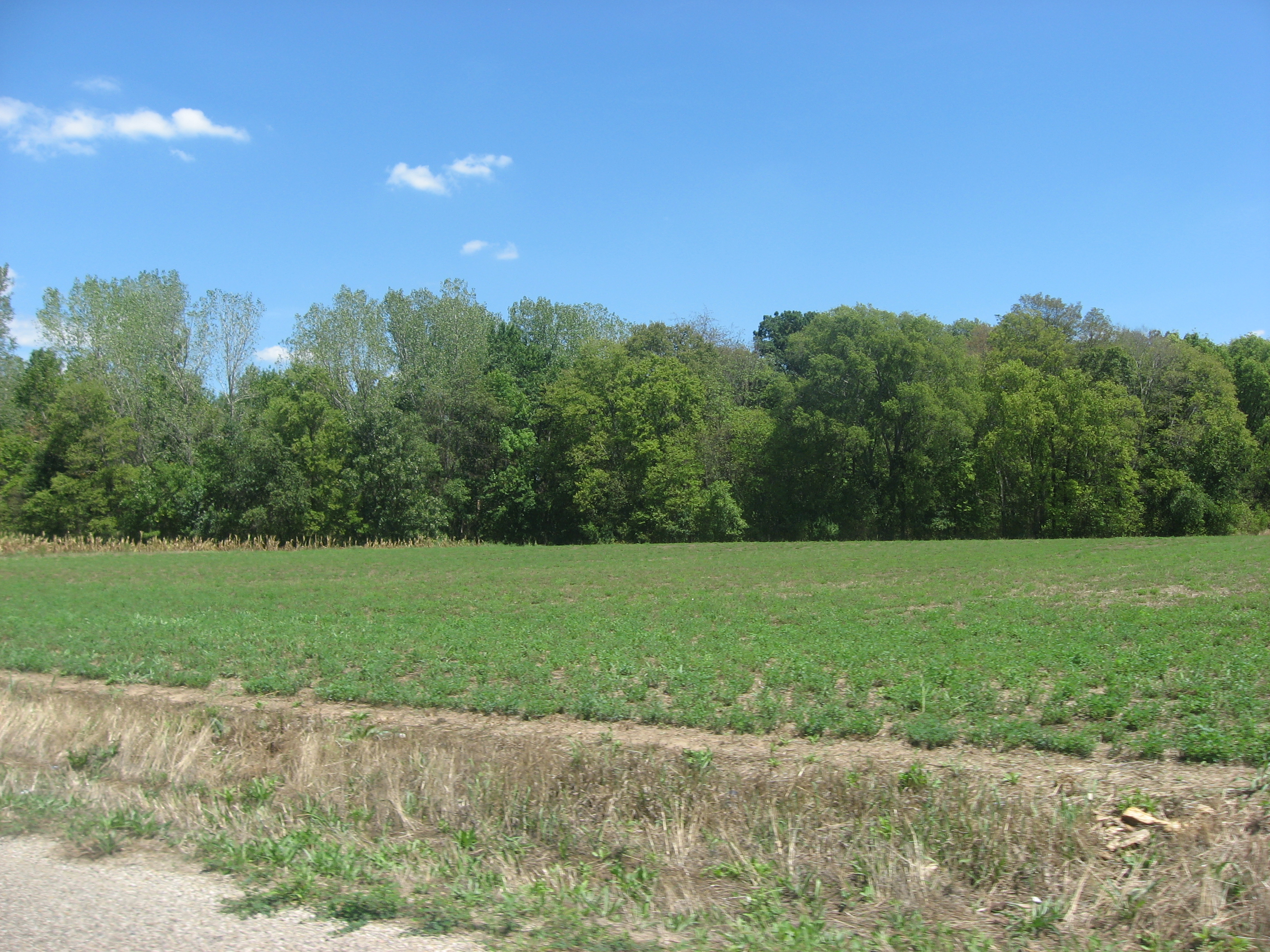
- The Stoner Site, an important archaeological site in the township

- Location in Crawford County

- Crawford County's location in Illinois
- Coordinates: 39°00′53″N 87°37′12″W
- Country: United States
- State: Illinois
- County: Crawford
- Established: November 5, 1867

Area
  - Total: 51.41 sq mi (133.2 km^{2})
  - Land: 50.79 sq mi (131.5 km^{2})
  - Water: 0.62 sq mi (1.6 km^{2}) 1.20%
- Elevation: 436 ft (133 m)

Population (2020)
  - Total: 1,887
  - Density: 37.15/sq mi (14.34/km^{2})
- Time zone: UTC-6 (CST)
  - Summer (DST): UTC-5 (CDT)
- ZIP codes: 62451, 62454
- FIPS code: 17-033-41833

Lamotte Township is one of ten townships in Crawford County, Illinois, USA. As of the 2020 census, its population was 1,887 and it contained 945 housing units. Its name changed from Palestine Township sometime before 1921.

== Geography ==
According to the 2021 census gazetteer files, Lamotte Township has a total area of 51.41 square miles (133.15 km^{2}), of which 50.79 square miles (131.55 km^{2}) (or 98.80%) is land and 0.62 square miles (1.61 km^{2}) (or 1.20%) is water. The Wabash River defines its eastern border.

=== Cities, towns, villages ===
- Palestine

=== Unincorporated towns ===
- Gordon
- Richwoods
- Trimble

(This list is based on USGS data and may include former settlements.)

=== Cemeteries ===
The township contains these seven cemeteries: Barbee, East Union, Green, Higgins, Kitchell, Neathery and Oak Grove.

=== Major highways ===
- Illinois Route 33

=== Airports and landing strips ===
- Robinson Municipal Airport

=== Landmarks ===
- Leaverton Park

== Demographics ==
As of the 2020 census there were 1,887 people, 876 households, and 569 families residing in the township. The population density was 36.71 inhabitants per square mile (14.17/km^{2}). There were 945 housing units at an average density of 18.38 per square mile (7.10/km^{2}). The racial makeup of the township was 95.97% White, 0.00% African American, 0.00% Native American, 0.79% Asian, 0.00% Pacific Islander, 0.26% from other races, and 2.97% from two or more races. Hispanic or Latino of any race were 0.69% of the population.

There were 876 households, out of which 30.50% had children under the age of 18 living with them, 46.35% were married couples living together, 14.61% had a female householder with no spouse present, and 35.05% were non-families. 31.20% of all households were made up of individuals, and 13.20% had someone living alone who was 65 years of age or older. The average household size was 2.24 and the average family size was 2.66.

The township's age distribution consisted of 24.2% under the age of 18, 4.9% from 18 to 24, 20.7% from 25 to 44, 29.1% from 45 to 64, and 21.1% who were 65 years of age or older. The median age was 45.1 years. For every 100 females, there were 80.4 males. For every 100 females age 18 and over, there were 80.6 males.

The median income for a household in the township was $51,337, and the median income for a family was $57,899. Males had a median income of $46,146 versus $29,559 for females. The per capita income for the township was $30,072. About 6.2% of families and 8.8% of the population were below the poverty line, including 7.5% of those under age 18 and 5.8% of those age 65 or over.

Historical population
Census	Pop.	Note	%±
1930	2,838		—
1940	2,730		−3.8%
1950	2,670		−2.2%
1960	2,472		−7.4%
1970	2,500		1.1%
1980	2,579		3.2%
1990	2,413		−6.4%
2000	2,093		−13.3%
2010	2,046		−2.2%
2020	1,887		−7.8%
U.S. Decennial Census

== School districts ==
- Hutsonville Community Unit School District 1
- Palestine Community Unit School District 3
- Robinson Community Unit School District 2
- Oblong Community Unit School District 4

== Political districts ==
- Illinois's 15th congressional district
- State House District 109
- State Senate District 55
