= Honey Creek Township, Illinois =

Honey Creek Township may refer to one of the following places in the State of Illinois:

- Honey Creek Township, Adams County, Illinois
- Honey Creek Township, Crawford County, Illinois

See also

- Honey Point Township, Macoupin County, Illinois
- Honey Creek Township (disambiguation)
