= Hutsonville Township, Crawford County, Illinois =

Hutsonville Township
- Township
- Location in Crawford County

- Crawford County's location in Illinois
- Coordinates: 39°07′04″N 87°41′03″W
- Country: United States
- State: Illinois
- County: Crawford
- Established: November 5, 1867

Area
  - Total: 37.57 sq mi (97.3 km^{2})
  - Land: 36.87 sq mi (95.5 km^{2})
  - Water: 0.70 sq mi (1.8 km^{2}) 1.87%
- Elevation: 495 ft (151 m)

Population (2020)
  - Total: 994
  - Density: 27.0/sq mi (10.4/km^{2})
- Time zone: UTC-6 (CST)
  - Summer (DST): UTC-5 (CDT)
- ZIP codes: 62433, 62451, 62454, 62478
- FIPS code: 17-033-36854

Hutsonville Township is one of ten townships in Crawford County, Illinois, USA. As of the 2020 census, its population was 994 and it contained 486 housing units.

== Geography ==
According to the 2021 census gazetteer files, Hutsonville Township has a total area of 37.57 square miles (97.31 km^{2}), of which 36.87 square miles (95.49 km^{2}) (or 98.13%) is land and 0.70 square miles (1.81 km^{2}) (or 1.87%) is water. The Wabash River defines its eastern border.

=== Cities, towns, villages ===
- Hutsonville

=== Unincorporated towns ===
- West York

=== Cemeteries ===
The township contains these eight cemeteries: Ball, Bradbury, Draper, Guyer, Hutson Old, Hutsonville New, Lindley and Musgrave.

=== Major highways ===
- Illinois Route 1

== Demographics ==
As of the 2020 census there were 994 people, 483 households, and 262 families residing in the township. The population density was 26.46 inhabitants per square mile (10.22/km^{2}). There were 486 housing units at an average density of 12.94 per square mile (5.00/km^{2}). The racial makeup of the township was 95.88% White, 0.60% African American, 0.30% Native American, 0.30% Asian, 0.00% Pacific Islander, 0.70% from other races, and 2.21% from two or more races. Hispanic or Latino of any race were 1.61% of the population.

There were 483 households, out of which 16.80% had children under the age of 18 living with them, 49.07% were married couples living together, 3.11% had a female householder with no spouse present, and 45.76% were non-families. 30.80% of all households were made up of individuals, and 6.00% had someone living alone who was 65 years of age or older. The average household size was 1.99 and the average family size was 2.59.

The township's age distribution consisted of 13.4% under the age of 18, 9.7% from 18 to 24, 19.5% from 25 to 44, 39.6% from 45 to 64, and 17.7% who were 65 years of age or older. The median age was 51.5 years. For every 100 females, there were 99.4 males. For every 100 females age 18 and over, there were 112.9 males.

The median income for a household in the township was $51,991, and the median income for a family was $81,607. Males had a median income of $33,333 versus $41,458 for females. The per capita income for the township was $29,381. About 11.5% of families and 19.7% of the population were below the poverty line, including 10.6% of those under age 18 and 8.0% of those age 65 or over.

Historical population
Census	Pop.	Note	%±
1930	1,532		—
1940	1,660		8.4%
1950	1,419		−14.5%
1960	1,301		−8.3%
1970	1,195		−8.1%
1980	1,438		20.3%
1990	1,333		−7.3%
2000	1,303		−2.3%
2010	1,177		−9.7%
2020	994		−15.5%
U.S. Decennial Census

== School districts ==
- Hutsonville Community Unit School District 1
- Palestine Community Unit School District 3
- Robinson Community Unit School District 2

== Political districts ==
- Illinois' 15th congressional district
- State House District 109
- State Senate District 55
