= Licking Township, Crawford County, Illinois =

Licking Township
- Township
- Location in Crawford County

- Crawford County's location in Illinois
- Coordinates: 39°07′28″N 87°53′42″W
- Country: United States
- State: Illinois
- County: Crawford
- Established: November 5, 1867

Area
  - Total: 40.61 sq mi (105.2 km^{2})
  - Land: 40.59 sq mi (105.1 km^{2})
  - Water: 0.01 sq mi (0.026 km^{2}) 0.03%
- Elevation: 535 ft (163 m)

Population (2020)
  - Total: 407
  - Density: 10.0/sq mi (3.87/km^{2})
- Time zone: UTC-6 (CST)
  - Summer (DST): UTC-5 (CDT)
- ZIP codes: 62413, 62442, 62449
- FIPS code: 17-033-43315

Licking Township is one of ten townships in Crawford County, Illinois, USA. As of the 2020 census, its population was 407 and it contained 170 housing units.

== Geography ==
According to the 2021 census gazetteer files, Licking Township has a total area of 40.61 square miles (105.18 km^{2}), of which 40.59 square miles (105.13 km^{2}) (or 99.97%) is land and 0.01 square miles (0.03 km^{2}) (or 0.03%) is water.

=== Unincorporated towns ===
- Bellair
- Kibbie

(This list is based on USGS data and may include former settlements.)

=== Cemeteries ===
The township contains these five cemeteries: Bellair, Duggan, Harmony, Prairie Grove and Randolph.

== Demographics ==
As of the 2020 census there were 407 people, 311 households, and 260 families residing in the township. The population density was 10.02 inhabitants per square mile (3.87/km^{2}). There were 170 housing units at an average density of 4.19 per square mile (1.62/km^{2}). The racial makeup of the township was 98.28% White, 0.25% African American, 0.25% Native American, 0.00% Asian, 0.00% Pacific Islander, 0.49% from other races, and 0.74% from two or more races. Hispanic or Latino of any race were 0.25% of the population.

There were 311 households, out of which 51.40% had children under the age of 18 living with them, 57.56% were married couples living together, 23.15% had a female householder with no spouse present, and 16.40% were non-families. 15.40% of all households were made up of individuals, and 13.80% had someone living alone who was 65 years of age or older. The average household size was 2.27 and the average family size was 2.52.

The township's age distribution consisted of 32.9% under the age of 18, 10.9% from 18 to 24, 19.8% from 25 to 44, 21.1% from 45 to 64, and 15.3% who were 65 years of age or older. The median age was 31.0 years. For every 100 females, there were 127.0 males. For every 100 females age 18 and over, there were 86.6 males.

The median income for a household in the township was $37,589, and the median income for a family was $37,679. Males had a median income of $53,083 versus $23,403 for females. The per capita income for the township was $26,176. None of the population was below the poverty line.

Historical population
Census	Pop.	Note	%±
1930	904		—
1940	890		−1.5%
1950	718		−19.3%
1960	528		−26.5%
1970	392		−25.8%
1980	401		2.3%
1990	324		−19.2%
2000	384		18.5%
2010	448		16.7%
2020	407		−9.2%
U.S. Decennial Census

== School districts ==
- Casey-Westfield Community Unit School District 4c
- Hutsonville Community Unit School District 1
- Oblong Community Unit School District 4

== Political districts ==
- Illinois' 15th congressional district
- State House District 109
- State Senate District 55
