= Robinson Township =

Robinson Township may refer to:

== Canada ==
- Robinson Township, Ontario

== United States ==
- Robinson Township, Crawford County, Illinois
- Robinson Township, Posey County, Indiana
- Robinson Township, Brown County, Kansas
- Robinson Township, Ottawa County, Michigan
- Robinson Township, Kidder County, North Dakota, in Kidder County, North Dakota
- Robinson Township, Allegheny County, Pennsylvania
- Robinson Township, Washington County, Pennsylvania
