= Richard Porter =

Richard Porter may refer to:

- Richard Porter (radio), on Heart Kent
- Richard Porter (MP) for Midhurst (UK Parliament constituency)
- Richard Kalan Porter or Kalan Porter, Canadian singer/songwriter
- Dick Porter, American baseball player
- Ricky Porter, American football player
- Richard Thomas Porter founding partner in the firm of Aveling and Porter.
- Richard Porter, writer on Petrolheads and Sniff Petrol
- Richard Porter, namesake of Porterville, Illinois
- Rich Porter, American drug kingpin in the 1990s.
