= Willow Hill Township, Jasper County, Illinois =

Willow Hill Township
- Township
- Location in Jasper County

- Jasper County's location in Illinois
- Coordinates: 38°59′12″N 88°00′44″W
- Country: United States
- State: Illinois
- County: Jasper
- Established: November 8, 1859

Area
  - Total: 34.17 sq mi (88.5 km^{2})
  - Land: 34.14 sq mi (88.4 km^{2})
  - Water: 0.03 sq mi (0.078 km^{2}) 0.09%
- Elevation: 490 ft (150 m)

Population (2020)
  - Total: 558
  - Density: 16.3/sq mi (6.31/km^{2})
- Time zone: UTC-6 (CST)
  - Summer (DST): UTC-5 (CDT)
- ZIP codes: 62448, 62449, 62480
- FIPS code: 17-079-82023

Willow Hill Township is one of eleven townships in Jasper County, Illinois, USA. As of the 2020 census, its population was 558 and it contained 254 housing units.

== Geography ==
According to the 2021 census gazetteer files, Willow Hill Township has a total area of 34.17 square miles (88.50 km^{2}), of which 34.14 square miles (88.42 km^{2}) (or 99.91%) is land and 0.03 square miles (0.08 km^{2}) (or 0.09%) is water.

=== Cities, towns, villages ===
- Willow Hill

=== Adjacent townships ===
- Hunt City Township (north)
- Oblong Township, Crawford County (east)
- Sainte Marie Township (south)
- Fox Township (southwest)
- Wade Township (west)

=== Cemeteries ===
The township contains these four cemeteries: Edison, Miller, Shiloh and Todd.

=== Major highways ===
- Illinois Route 33
- Illinois Route 49

== Demographics ==
As of the 2020 census there were 558 people, 207 households, and 132 families residing in the township. The population density was 16.33 inhabitants per square mile (6.31/km^{2}). There were 254 housing units at an average density of 7.43 per square mile (2.87/km^{2}). The racial makeup of the township was 96.59% White, 0.00% African American, 0.36% Native American, 0.36% Asian, 0.18% Pacific Islander, 0.36% from other races, and 2.15% from two or more races. Hispanic or Latino of any race were 0.72% of the population.

There were 207 households, out of which 17.40% had children under the age of 18 living with them, 45.41% were married couples living together, 16.43% had a female householder with no spouse present, and 36.23% were non-families. 34.80% of all households were made up of individuals, and 17.40% had someone living alone who was 65 years of age or older. The average household size was 2.45 and the average family size was 3.20.

The township's age distribution consisted of 27.0% under the age of 18, 6.1% from 18 to 24, 14.6% from 25 to 44, 34.1% from 45 to 64, and 18.3% who were 65 years of age or older. The median age was 48.1 years. For every 100 females, there were 84.1 males. For every 100 females age 18 and over, there were 94.2 males.

The median income for a household in the township was $29,306, and the median income for a family was $46,136. Males had a median income of $32,011 versus $11,902 for females. The per capita income for the township was $18,667. About 26.5% of families and 40.7% of the population were below the poverty line, including 79.6% of those under age 18 and 15.1% of those age 65 or over.

Historical population
Census	Pop.	Note	%±
2000	700		—
2010	638		−8.9%
2020	558		−12.5%
U.S. Decennial Census

== School districts ==
- Jasper County Community Unit School District 1
- Oblong Community Unit School District 4

== Political districts ==
- Illinois' 19th congressional district
- State House District 108
- State Senate District 54
