= Ben Oas =

American football player (1901–1976)

Profile
- Positions: Center, back

Personal information
- Born: April 27, 1901; Minneapolis
- Died: February 1, 1976 (aged 74); Trimble, Illinois
- Listed height: 6 ft 0 in (1.83 m)
- Listed weight: 195 lb (88 kg)

Career information
- High school: Greenway (MN)
- College: St. Mary's (MN)

Career history
- Minneapolis Red Jackets (1929)

Career statistics
- Games: 7

Ben Oas (April 27, 1901 – February 1, 1976) was an American football player.

Oas was born in 1901 in Minnesota. He played college football as a center and fullback for St Mary's (MN) from 1925 to 1928. He also played center for the St. Mary's basketball team.

Oas also played professional football in the National Football League (NFL) as a center and back for the Minneapolis Red Jackets during the 1929 season. He appeared in seven NFL games, four as a starter.

Oas died in February 1976 in Trimble, Illinois.
