= Riddleville, Illinois =

- Unincorporated community
- Location within Illinois Location within the United States
- Coordinates: 38°51′07″N 87°39′05″W
- Country: United States
- State: Illinois
- Counties: Crawford, Lawrence
- Townships: Montgomery, Bond
- Elevation: 492 ft (150 m)
- Time zone: UTC-6 (Central (CST))
  - Summer (DST): UTC-5 (CDT)
- Area code: 618
- GNIS feature ID: 423117

Riddleville is an unincorporated community in Crawford and Lawrence counties, Illinois, United States. Riddleville is 1.5 miles (2.4 km) northeast of Birds.
