= Lamotte Township =

Lamotte Township may refer to the following places in the United States:

- Lamotte Township, Crawford County, Illinois
- Lamotte Township, Michigan
