= Southwest Township =

Southwest Township may refer to:

- Southwest Township, Crawford County, Illinois
- Southwest Township, Lenoir County, North Carolina
- Southwest Township, Sargent County, North Dakota
- Southwest Township, Warren County, Pennsylvania
