= Morea, Illinois =

- Unincorporated community
- Location within Illinois Location within the United States
- Coordinates: 38°55′36″N 87°37′56″W
- Country: United States
- State: Illinois
- County: Crawford
- Elevation: 561 ft (171 m)
- Time zone: UTC-6 (Central (CST))
  - Summer (DST): UTC-5 (CDT)
- Area code: 618
- GNIS feature ID: 422998

Morea is an unincorporated community in Crawford County, Illinois, United States. Morea is 3 miles (4.8 km) northeast of Flat Rock.
