= Honey Creek Township =

Honey Creek Township may refer to:

== Illinois ==
- Honey Creek Township, Adams County, Illinois
- Honey Creek Township, Crawford County, Illinois

== Indiana ==
- Honey Creek Township, Howard County, Indiana
- Honey Creek Township, Vigo County, Indiana
- Honey Creek Township, White County, Indiana

== Iowa ==
- Honey Creek Township, Delaware County, Iowa
- Honey Creek Township, Iowa County, Iowa

== Missouri ==
- Honey Creek Township, Henry County, Missouri
