= Oil Grove, Illinois =

- Unincorporated community
- Location within Illinois Location within the United States
- Coordinates: 38°51′46″N 87°38′30″W
- Country: United States
- State: Illinois
- County: Crawford
- Elevation: 558 ft (170 m)
- Time zone: UTC-6 (Central (CST))
  - Summer (DST): UTC-5 (CDT)
- Area code: 618
- GNIS feature ID: 423035

Oil Grove is an unincorporated community in Crawford County, Illinois, United States. Oil Grove is 3 miles (4.8 km) southeast of Flat Rock.
