= Southwest Township, Crawford County, Illinois =

Southwest Township
- Township
- Location in Crawford County

- Crawford County's location in Illinois
- Coordinates: 38°51′53″N 87°52′14″W
- Country: United States
- State: Illinois
- County: Crawford
- Established: June 21, 1869

Area
  - Total: 15.05 sq mi (39.0 km^{2})
  - Land: 15.05 sq mi (39.0 km^{2})
  - Water: 0 sq mi (0 km^{2}) 0%
- Elevation: 479 ft (146 m)

Population (2020)
  - Total: 96
  - Density: 6.4/sq mi (2.5/km^{2})
- Time zone: UTC-6 (CST)
  - Summer (DST): UTC-5 (CDT)
- ZIP codes: 62421, 62466
- FIPS code: 17-033-71344

Southwest Township is one of ten townships in Crawford County, Illinois, USA. As of the 2020 census, its population was 96 and it contained 38 housing units.

== Geography ==
According to the 2010 census, the township has a total area of 15.05 square miles (39.0 km^{2}), all land.

=== Unincorporated towns ===
- Landes

=== Cemeteries ===
The township contains these two cemeteries: Keplinger and Waggoner.

== Demographics ==
As of the 2020 census there were 96 people, 18 households, and 18 families residing in the township. The population density was 6.38 inhabitants per square mile (2.46/km^{2}). There were 38 housing units at an average density of 2.52 per square mile (0.97/km^{2}). The racial makeup of the township was 87.50% White, 0.00% African American, 0.00% Native American, 2.08% Asian, 0.00% Pacific Islander, 0.00% from other races, and 10.42% from two or more races. Hispanic or Latino of any race were 1.04% of the population.

There were 18 households, out of which none had children under the age of 18 living with them, 100.00% were married couples living together, none had a female householder with no spouse present, and none were non-families. No households were made up of individuals.

The township's age distribution consisted of 0.0% under the age of 18, 0.0% from 18 to 24, 0.0% from 25 to 44, 58.8% from 45 to 64, and 41.2% who were 65 years of age or older. The median age was 57.6 years. For every 100 females, there were 88.9 males. For every 100 females age 18 and over, there were 88.9 males.

Historical population
Census	Pop.	Note	%±
1930	322		—
1940	305		−5.3%
1950	198		−35.1%
1960	134		−32.3%
1970	101		−24.6%
1980	111		9.9%
1990	102		−8.1%
2000	76		−25.5%
2010	97		27.6%
2020	96		−1.0%
U.S. Decennial Census

== School districts ==
- Oblong Community Unit School District 4
- Red Hill Community Unit School District 10

== Political districts ==
- Illinois' 15th congressional district
- State House District 109
- State Senate District 55
