= Dogwood, Illinois =

- Unincorporated community
- Location within Illinois Location within the United States
- Coordinates: 39°03′50″N 87°53′27″W
- Country: United States
- State: Illinois
- County: Crawford
- Elevation: 499 ft (152 m)
- Time zone: UTC-6 (Central (CST))
  - Summer (DST): UTC-5 (CDT)
- Area code: 618
- GNIS feature ID: 422633

Dogwood is an unincorporated community in Crawford County, Illinois, United States. Dogwood is 4.5 miles (7.2 km) north-northeast of Oblong.
