= Port Jackson, Illinois =

- Unincorporated community
- Location within Illinois Location within the United States
- Coordinates: 38°51′49″N 87°46′42″W
- Country: United States
- State: Illinois
- County: Crawford
- Elevation: 456 ft (139 m)
- Time zone: UTC-6 (Central (CST))
  - Summer (DST): UTC-5 (CDT)
- Area code: 618
- GNIS feature ID: 423079

Port Jackson is an unincorporated community in Crawford County, Illinois, United States. Port Jackson is 6 miles (9.7 km) southwest of Flat Rock.
