= Crawford County Courthouse (Illinois) =

Local government building in the United States

Coordinates: 39°0′19″N 87°44′22″W

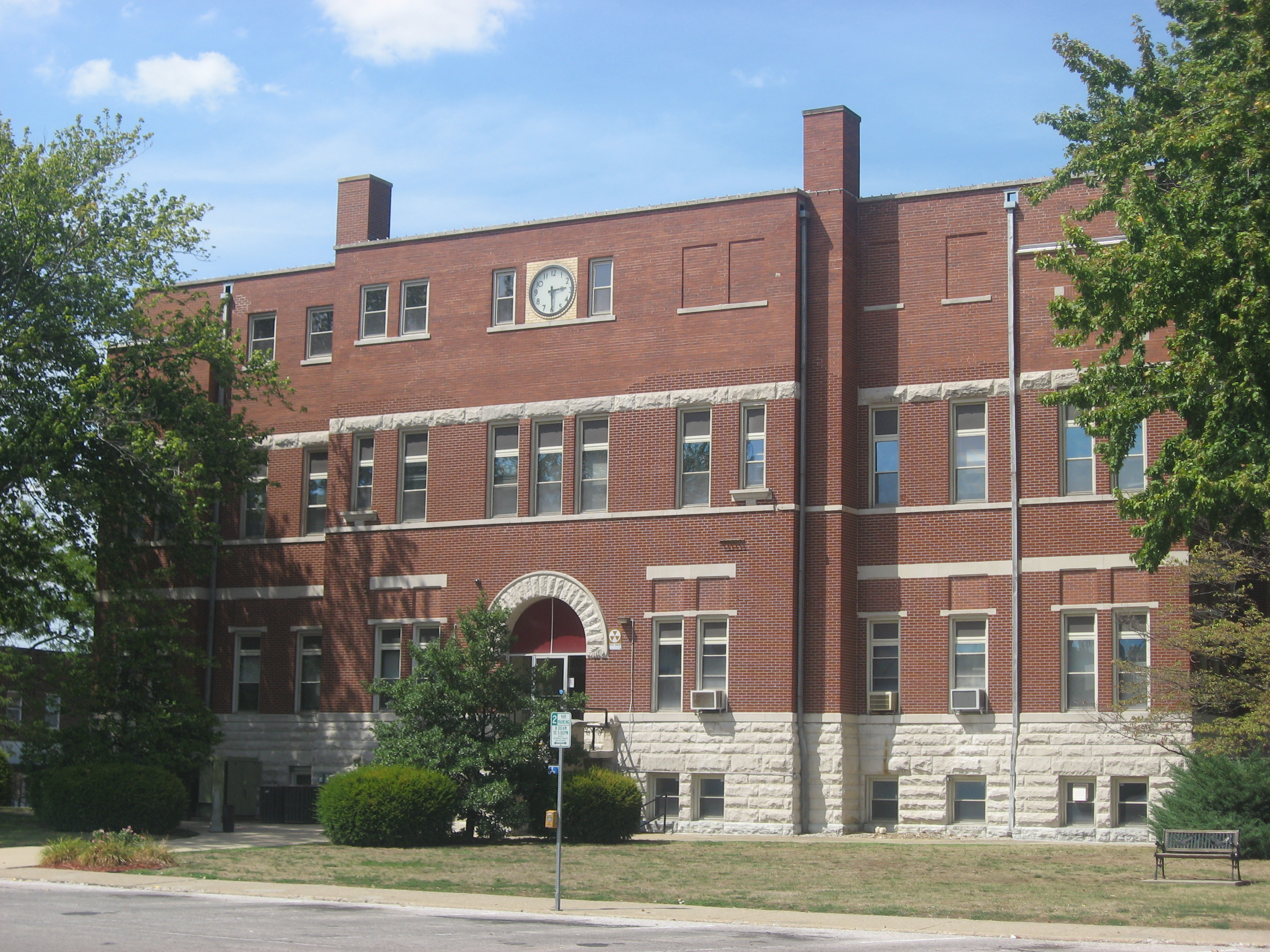
Southern side

The Crawford County Courthouse is a government building in Robinson, the county seat of Crawford County, Illinois, United States. Completed in 1895, it is the second courthouse built in Robinson and the fifth in the county's history.

== Early history ==
Crawford County's first settler is reputed to have been one Lamotte, only the first of many Frenchmen who migrated west from Vincennes, Indiana. He was followed by several anglophone families who founded Palestine circa 1809. The legislature of the Illinois Territory created Crawford County in 1816,and the new county's courts began meeting near Palestine in 1817. Palestine remained the county seat until 1843, when Robinson won a referendum on the location question.

Three separate buildings were constructed as courthouses in Palestine. The first was a brick building constructed by local brick masons in 1819, but it was built of poor material, and three lightning strikes left it so badly damaged that the county was forced to abandon it. After a period of renting rooms elsewhere in the town, the county arranged for a frame courthouse to be built in 1830, but it was never occupied, as it was arsoned on the night before the county courts were to start using it. In its place, a brick building was constructed in 1832; it remained in use until Robinson became the county seat, after which time it became a church.

After occupying two houses in Robinson, the county built a brick courthouse in 1844 at a cost of $4,200. Despite several expansions over the years, it became insufficient by the 1880s; in 1883, the History of Crawford and Clark counties, Illinois remarked that it "at the present time sadly needs improving with a new one." Nevertheless, it remained in use for more than a decade.

== Current courthouse ==
The current Crawford County Courthouse was constructed in 1895 and 1896, featuring Romanesque Revival elements such as rounded archways, small round turrets with peaked roofs, and a square bell tower at the center of the building. A raised stone foundation permits light to enter the basement, and stone belt courses separate the brickwork of each storey. Originally, a pitched roof sat above two stories of brick walls and rose to a flat section surrounding the tower. Unfortunately, the building retained this form for only a few years, as it was wracked by fire on March 28, 1899. The basic plan was saved, but after a few years, county officials removed the tower and the turret peaks and installed a flat roof. Today, the building retains much of this form, including the triple Romanesque entryway, although a third story has been constructed atop the original two.
