= Heathsville, Illinois =

- Unincorporated community
- Location within Illinois Location within the United States
- Coordinates: 38°53′48″N 87°34′04″W
- Country: United States
- State: Illinois
- County: Crawford
- Elevation: 492 ft (150 m)

Population (2010)
  - Total: 2
- Time zone: UTC-6 (Central (CST))
  - Summer (DST): UTC-5 (CDT)
- Area code: 618
- GNIS feature ID: 410007

Heathsville is an unincorporated community in Crawford County, Illinois, United States. Heathsville is located on Illinois Route 33, 5.5 miles (8.9 km) east of Flat Rock.

Most notably, it is the childhood home of Lawrence Seymour Heath who founded LS Heath & Sons and the original Heath Candy plant in nearby Robinson, Illinois.
