= Kibbie, Illinois =

- Unincorporated community
- Location within Illinois Location within the United States
- Coordinates: 39°04′11″N 87°56′17″W
- Country: United States
- State: Illinois
- County: Crawford
- Elevation: 502 ft (153 m)
- Time zone: UTC-6 (Central (CST))
  - Summer (DST): UTC-5 (CDT)
- Area code: 618
- GNIS feature ID: 422875

Kibbie is an unincorporated community in Crawford County, Illinois, United States. Kibbie is 5 miles (8.0 km) north-northwest of Oblong.
