= Landes, Illinois =

- Unincorporated community
- Location within Illinois Location within the United States
- Coordinates: 38°51′53″N 87°53′21″W
- Country: United States
- State: Illinois
- County: Crawford
- Elevation: 459 ft (140 m)
- Time zone: UTC-6 (Central (CST))
  - Summer (DST): UTC-5 (CDT)
- Area code: 618
- GNIS feature ID: 422895

Landes is an unincorporated community in Crawford County, Illinois, United States. Landes is 9.5 miles (15.3 km) south-southeast of Oblong.
