= Robinson Township, Crawford County, Illinois =

Robinson Township
- Township
- Location in Crawford County

- Crawford County's location in Illinois
- Coordinates: 39°00′50″N 87°44′59″W
- Country: United States
- State: Illinois
- County: Crawford
- Established: November 5, 1867

Area
  - Total: 57.42 sq mi (148.7 km^{2})
  - Land: 57.18 sq mi (148.1 km^{2})
  - Water: 0.24 sq mi (0.62 km^{2}) 0.42%
- Elevation: 548 ft (167 m)

Population (2020)
  - Total: 9,303
  - Density: 162.7/sq mi (62.82/km^{2})
- Time zone: UTC-6 (CST)
  - Summer (DST): UTC-5 (CDT)
- ZIP codes: 62433, 62454
- FIPS code: 17-033-64720
- Website: robinsontownship.org

Robinson Township is one of ten townships in Crawford County, Illinois, USA. As of the 2020 census, its population was 9,303 and it contained 4,165 housing units.

== Geography ==
According to the 2021 census gazetteer files, Robinson Township has a total area of 57.42 square miles (148.72 km^{2}), of which 57.18 square miles (148.10 km^{2}) (or 99.58%) is land and 0.24 square miles (0.62 km^{2}) (or 0.42%) is water.

=== Cities, towns, villages ===
- Robinson (the county seat)

=== Cemeteries ===
The township contains these six cemeteries: Duncanville, Kirk, Minnick, New Robinson, Newlin and Old Robinson.

=== Major highways ===
- Illinois Route 1
- Illinois Route 33

=== Airports and landing strips ===
- Crawford Memorial Hospital Heliport

=== Lakes ===
- Brooks Lake
- West Lake

=== Landmarks ===
- City Park
- Washington Park

== Demographics ==
As of the 2020 census there were 9,303 people, 3,371 households, and 2,217 families residing in the township. The population density was 162.01 inhabitants per square mile (62.55/km^{2}). There were 4,165 housing units at an average density of 72.53 per square mile (28.00/km^{2}). The racial makeup of the township was 86.69% White, 6.16% African American, 0.32% Native American, 0.51% Asian, 0.01% Pacific Islander, 2.46% from other races, and 3.85% from two or more races. Hispanic or Latino of any race were 3.88% of the population.

There were 3,371 households, out of which 32.90% had children under the age of 18 living with them, 49.69% were married couples living together, 12.22% had a female householder with no spouse present, and 34.23% were non-families. 30.00% of all households were made up of individuals, and 15.90% had someone living alone who was 65 years of age or older. The average household size was 2.14 and the average family size was 2.57.

The township's age distribution consisted of 17.0% under the age of 18, 7.8% from 18 to 24, 31.9% from 25 to 44, 25.6% from 45 to 64, and 17.7% who were 65 years of age or older. The median age was 40.8 years. For every 100 females, there were 145.4 males. For every 100 females age 18 and over, there were 154.0 males.

The median income for a household in the township was $47,254, and the median income for a family was $71,432. Males had a median income of $44,590 versus $25,724 for females. The per capita income for the township was $24,911. About 10.5% of families and 12.6% of the population were below the poverty line, including 11.1% of those under age 18 and 10.4% of those age 65 or o

Historical population
Census	Pop.	Note	%±
1930	6,615		—
1940	7,009		6.0%
1950	8,130		16.0%
1960	9,056		11.4%
1970	9,026		−0.3%
1980	9,349		3.6%
1990	8,842		−5.4%
2000	10,138		14.7%
2010	9,900		−2.3%
2020	9,303		−6.0%
U.S. Decennial Census

== School districts ==
- Robinson Community Unit School District 2

== Political districts ==
- Illinois' 15th congressional district
- State House District 109
- State Senate District 55
