= Green Brier, Illinois =

- Unincorporated community
- Location within Illinois Location within the United States
- Coordinates: 38°54′31″N 87°54′26″W
- Country: United States
- State: Illinois
- County: Crawford
- Elevation: 449 ft (137 m)
- Time zone: UTC-6 (Central (CST))
  - Summer (DST): UTC-5 (CDT)
- Area code: 618
- GNIS feature ID: 422754

Green Brier is an unincorporated community in Crawford County, Illinois, United States. Green Brier is 6.5 miles (10.5 km) south of Oblong.
