= Pierceburg, Illinois =

- Unincorporated community
- Location within Illinois Location within the United States
- Coordinates: 38°55′50″N 87°54′28″W
- Country: United States
- State: Illinois
- County: Crawford
- Elevation: 456 ft (139 m)
- Time zone: UTC-6 (Central (CST))
  - Summer (DST): UTC-5 (CDT)
- Area code: 618
- GNIS feature ID: 415645

Pierceburg is an unincorporated community in Crawford County, Illinois, United States. Pierceburg is 5 miles (8.0 km) south of Oblong.
