= Annapolis, Illinois =

- Census-designated place (CDP)
- Location within Illinois Location within the United States
- Coordinates: 39°08′35″N 87°49′02″W
- Country: United States
- State: Illinois
- County: Crawford

Area
  - Total: 0.35 sq mi (0.91 km^{2})
  - Land: 0.35 sq mi (0.91 km^{2})
  - Water: 0 sq mi (0.00 km^{2})
- Elevation: 577 ft (176 m)

Population (2020)
  - Total: 106
  - Density: 302.1/sq mi (116.65/km^{2})
- Time zone: UTC-6 (Central (CST))
  - Summer (DST): UTC-5 (CDT)
- ZIP code: 62413
- Area code: 618
- GNIS feature ID: 2583436

Annapolis is an unincorporated census-designated place (CDP) in Crawford County, Illinois, United States. Annapolis is 10 miles (16 km) north-northwest of Robinson. Annapolis has a post office with ZIP code 62413. Its population was 106 as of 2020.

== Geography ==
According to the 2021 census gazetteer files, Annapolis has a total area of 0.35 square miles (0.91 km^{2}), all land.

== Demographics ==
Historical population
Census	Pop.	Note	%±
2020	106		—
U.S. Decennial Census

As of the 2020 census there were 106 people, 15 households, and 6 families residing in the CDP. The population density was 301.99 inhabitants per square mile (116.60/km^{2}). There were 54 housing units at an average density of 153.85 per square mile (59.40/km^{2}). The racial makeup of the CDP was 98.11% White and 1.89% Asian. Hispanic or Latino of any race were 2.83% of the population.

There were 15 households, out of which 40.00% had children under the age of 18 living with them, 40.00% were married couples living together, 0.00% had a female householder with no husband present, and 60.00% were non-families. 40.00% of all households were made up of individuals, and 0.00% had someone living alone who was 65 years of age or older. The average household size was 3.00 and the average family size was 1.87.

The CDP's age distribution consisted of 21.4% under the age of 18, 0.0% from 18 to 24, 14.3% from 25 to 44, 64.3% from 45 to 64, and 0.0% who were 65 years of age or older. The median age was 45.3 years. For every 100 females, there were 47.4 males. For every 100 females age 18 and over, there were 69.2 males.
