= Duncanville, Illinois =

- Unincorporated community
- Location within Illinois Location within the United States
- Coordinates: 38°57′17″N 87°41′44″W
- Country: United States
- State: Illinois
- County: Crawford
- Elevation: 532 ft (162 m)
- Time zone: UTC-6 (Central (CST))
  - Summer (DST): UTC-5 (CDT)
- Area code: 618
- GNIS feature ID: 407490

Duncanville is an unincorporated community in Crawford County, Illinois, United States. Duncanville is 4 miles (6.4 km) southeast of Robinson. Duncanville is located half a mile west of Illinois Route 1. Duncanville has approximately 35 homes and 75 residents. Duncanville is the home to the New Hope Baptist Church.
