= Richwoods, Illinois =

- Unincorporated community
- Location within Illinois Location within the United States
- Coordinates: 38°57′29″N 87°33′15″W
- Country: United States
- State: Illinois
- County: Crawford
- Elevation: 453 ft (138 m)
- Time zone: UTC-6 (Central (CST))
  - Summer (DST): UTC-5 (CDT)
- Area code: 618
- GNIS feature ID: 423116

Richwoods is an unincorporated community in Crawford County, Illinois, United States. Richwoods is 4.5 miles (7.2 km) southeast of Palestine.
