= Ste. Marie, Illinois =

Ste. Marie, Illinois Sainte Marie
- Village
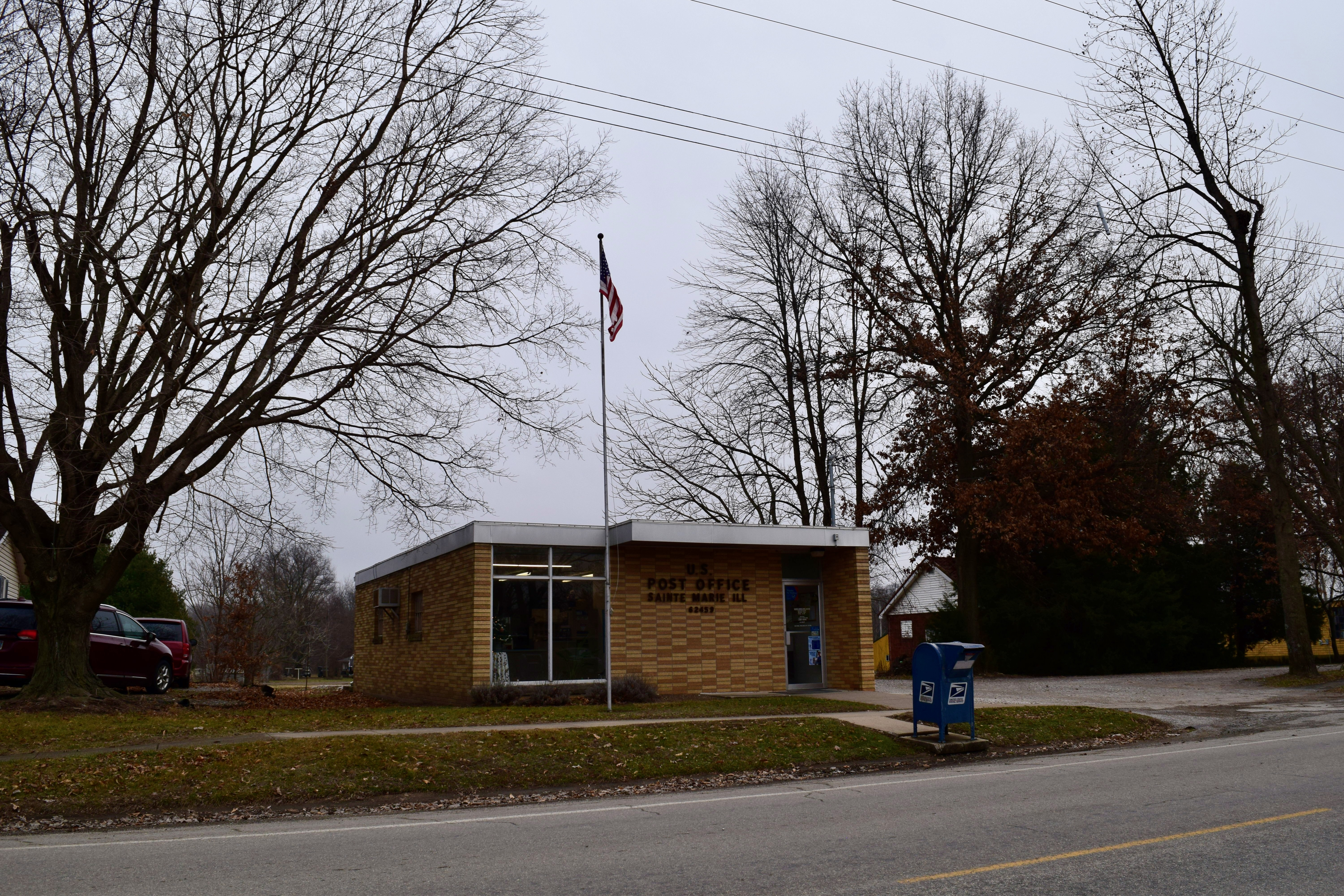
- Ste. Marie post office

- Location of Ste. Marie in Jasper County, Illinois
- Coordinates: 38°55′48″N 88°01′40″W
- Country: United States
- State: Illinois
- County: Jasper
- Township: Ste. Marie

Area
  - Total: 1.11 sq mi (2.87 km^{2})
  - Land: 1.11 sq mi (2.87 km^{2})
  - Water: 0 sq mi (0.00 km^{2})
- Elevation: 476 ft (145 m)

Population (2020)
  - Total: 238
  - Density: 214.7/sq mi (82.88/km^{2})
- Time zone: UTC-6 (CST)
  - Summer (DST): UTC-5 (CDT)
- ZIP code: 62459
- Area code: 618
- FIPS code: 17–66800
- GNIS feature ID: 2399172

Ste. Marie or Sainte Marie is a village in Jasper County, Illinois, United States, along the Embarras River. The population was 238 at the 2020 census.

== History ==
In the early 1800s, some French had become greatly concerned and dismayed by the effects on the Catholic Church from the French Revolution and the attacks by unbelieving philosophers. Some families, including the Picquets, began to consider emigrating in order to establish elsewhere a new social order based on the principles of the Gospel. In 1835, 19-year-old Joseph Picquet was sent to the United States to "spy out the land" and report back to the family. Joseph landed in New York and worked for nine months in a business house in Philadelphia. In early 1836, Joseph began his exploration of the country. His travels took him to Pittsburgh; Lima, Ohio; Fort Wayne, Indiana; Indianapolis; Vincennes, Indiana; Vandalia, Illinois; and St. Louis. Instructed to stay away from large cities, he turned eastward and finally decided on the land in Eastern Illinois that is now Ste. Marie, partly because of its proximity to Vincennes, a strong French city with an availability of priests to say Mass. At that time there was not a single house between Newton and Olney. In October 1836 Joseph returned to France and gave a favorable report of the land.

On January 29, 1837, an association of five including Jacques Picquet, Joseph Picquet, Joseph Schifferstein, Charles Hoffman and Joseph Picquet was formed, with the intent of acquiring and developing land in the United States. A contract was written and signed by the members of the association. On June 20, Joseph returned to the United States with the nucleus of a colony, all related by either blood or marriage, 25 in all, on the ship Mogul. Because they were all related, the new settlement was to be named Colonie des Freres or "Colony of Brothers". On July 20, the new immigrants bought a small farm near St. Francisville where they stayed for several months. On October 1, the settlers left St. Francisville and came to begin their new settlement. They boarded with William Price who had a cabin nearby. On October 12, Ferdinand Hartrich, Etienne Lauer and Joseph Picquet went to Palestine and recorded approximately 12,000 acres (49 km^{2}) in the Land Office there.

Father Stephen Theodore Badin, a Frenchman, came during this time to bless this work of their own hands and celebrate the Holy Sacrifice of the Mass in their presence. Father Badin was the first Catholic priest ordained in the United States. A stone monument fashioned to look like a log cabin stands on the grounds of the University of Notre Dame as a tribute to him. There is also a mosaic on the east porch of the Cathedral of the Immaculate Conception in Washington, D.C. in memory of him.

On October 28, 1837, the settlers gathered on a knoll south of the Embarras River and took formal possession of the land, dedicating the village to the Virgin Mary. The newly acquired land was called Colonie des Freres, or "Colony of Brothers". Eventually the name of the new settlement was changed to "St. Marie", with the name changing in 1892 to the French feminine version of the spelling.

Joseph Picquet made many more trips back to France to bring other family members to the new colony.

Ste. Marie quickly grew and erected its first church, free school, post office and store. It served as a cultural center amidst miles of wilderness.

== Geography ==
Ste. Marie is located in southeastern Jasper County. It is 9 miles (14 km) southeast of Newton, the county seat.

According to the 2021 census gazetteer files, Ste. Marie has a total area of 1.11 square miles (2.87 km^{2}), all land.

== Demographics ==
Historical population
Census	Pop.	Note	%±
1880	243		—
1890	318		30.9%
1900	406		27.7%
1910	450		10.8%
1920	351		−22.0%
1930	304		−13.4%
1940	293		−3.6%
1950	352		20.1%
1960	347		−1.4%
1970	335		−3.5%
1980	312		−6.9%
1990	281		−9.9%
2000	261		−7.1%
2010	244		−6.5%
2020	238		−2.5%
U.S. Decennial Census

As of the 2020 census there were 238 people, 112 households, and 85 families residing in the village. The population density was 214.61 inhabitants per square mile (82.86/km^{2}). There were 119 housing units at an average density of 107.30 per square mile (41.43/km^{2}). The racial makeup of the village was 96.64% White, 0.00% African American, 1.26% Native American, 0.84% Asian, 0.00% Pacific Islander, 0.42% from other races, and 0.84% from two or more races. Hispanic or Latino of any race were 0.84% of the population.

There were 112 households, out of which 42.9% had children under the age of 18 living with them, 50.89% were married couples living together, 11.61% had a female householder with no husband present, and 24.11% were non-families. 21.43% of all households were made up of individuals, and 9.82% had someone living alone who was 65 years of age or older. The average household size was 3.61 and the average family size was 3.20.

The village's age distribution consisted of 34.9% under the age of 18, 8.4% from 18 to 24, 28.5% from 25 to 44, 21.5% from 45 to 64, and 6.7% who were 65 years of age or older. The median age was 29.0 years. For every 100 females, there were 89.4 males. For every 100 females age 18 and over, there were 92.6 males.

The median income for a household in the village was $53,000, and the median income for a family was $63,393. Males had a median income of $52,500 versus $21,750 for females. The per capita income for the village was $19,729. About 9.4% of families and 13.7% of the population were below the poverty line, including 15.2% of those under age 18 and 4.2% of those age 65 or over.

== Media ==
The Sainte Marie Tribune was published in Sainte Marie from 1901 to 1918.

== Civics ==
Churches

- St. Mary's of the Assumption Catholic Church
- Pilgrim Holiness Church

Government/School

- Ste. Marie Post Office 62459
- Ste. Marie Elementary
- South Eastern Special Education
