= West York, Illinois =

- Census-designated place
- Location within Illinois
- Coordinates: 39°10′08″N 87°40′23″W
- Country: United States
- State: Illinois
- County: Crawford

Area
  - Total: 0.13 sq mi (0.34 km^{2})
  - Land: 0.13 sq mi (0.34 km^{2})
  - Water: 0 sq mi (0.00 km^{2})
- Elevation: 509 ft (155 m)

Population (2020)
  - Total: 74
  - Density: 557.5/sq mi (215.25/km^{2})
- Time zone: UTC-6 (Central (CST))
  - Summer (DST): UTC-5 (CDT)
- ZIP code: 62478
- Area code: 618
- GNIS feature ID: 2583444

West York is an unincorporated census-designated place in Crawford County, Illinois, United States. West York is 4.5 miles (7.2 km) north of Hutsonville. West York has a post office with ZIP code 62478. As of the 2020 census, the population was 74.

== Geography ==
According to the 2021 census gazetteer files, West York has a total area of 0.13 square miles (0.34 km^{2}), all land.

== Demographics ==
Historical population
Census	Pop.	Note	%±
2020	74		—
U.S. Decennial Census

As of the 2020 census there were 74 people, 29 households, and 5 families residing in the CDP. The population density was 556.39 inhabitants per square mile (214.82/km^{2}). There were 52 housing units at an average density of 390.98 per square mile (150.96/km^{2}). The racial makeup of the CDP was 94.59% White, and 2.70% from other races. None of the population was Hispanic or Latino of any race.

There were 29 households, out of which 17.2% had children under the age of 18 living with them, 17.24% were married couples living together, 0.00% had a female householder with no husband present, and 82.76% were non-families. 82.76% of all households were made up of individuals, and 0.00% had someone living alone who was 65 years of age or older. The average household size was 4.20 and the average family size was 1.55.

The CDP's age distribution consisted of 24.4% under the age of 18, none from 18 to 24, 11.1% from 25 to 44, 64.5% from 45 to 64, and none who were 65 years of age or older. The median age was 59.8 years. For every 100 females, there were 12.5 males. For every 100 females age 18 and over, there were 17.2 males.
