= New Hebron, Illinois =

- Unincorporated community
- Location within Illinois Location within the United States
- Coordinates: 38°57′00″N 87°44′40″W
- Country: United States
- State: Illinois
- County: Crawford
- Elevation: 535 ft (163 m)
- Time zone: UTC-6 (Central (CST))
  - Summer (DST): UTC-5 (CDT)
- Area code: 618
- GNIS feature ID: 414406

New Hebron is an unincorporated community in Crawford County, Illinois, United States. New Hebron is 3.5 miles (5.6 km) south of Robinson.
