= Bellair, Illinois =

- Unincorporated community
- Location within Illinois Location within the United States
- Coordinates: 39°08′31″N 87°56′43″W
- Country: United States
- State: Illinois
- County: Crawford
- Elevation: 545 ft (166 m)
- Time zone: UTC-6 (Central (CST))
  - Summer (DST): UTC-5 (CDT)
- Area code: 618
- GNIS feature ID: 404136

Bellair is an unincorporated community in Crawford County, Illinois, United States. Bellair is 4.5 miles (7.2 km) east-northeast of Yale.
