= Oil Center, Illinois =

- Unincorporated community
- Location within Illinois Location within the United States
- Coordinates: 38°58′05″N 87°49′58″W
- Country: United States
- State: Illinois
- County: Crawford
- Elevation: 495 ft (151 m)
- Time zone: UTC-6 (Central (CST))
  - Summer (DST): UTC-5 (CDT)
- Area code: 618
- GNIS feature ID: 423034

Oil Center is an unincorporated community in Crawford County, Illinois, United States. Oil Center is 2 miles (3.2 km) south of Stoy.
