= Trimble, Illinois =

- Unincorporated community
- Location within Illinois Location within the United States
- Coordinates: 39°03′48″N 87°41′04″W
- Country: United States
- State: Illinois
- County: Crawford
- Elevation: 499 ft (152 m)
- Time zone: UTC-6 (Central (CST))
  - Summer (DST): UTC-5 (CDT)
- Area code: 618
- GNIS feature ID: 419842

Trimble is an unincorporated community in Crawford County, Illinois, United States. It is located on Illinois Route 1, 5 miles (8.0 km) northeast of Robinson.
