= Crawford County, Illinois =

County in Illinois, United States

- County
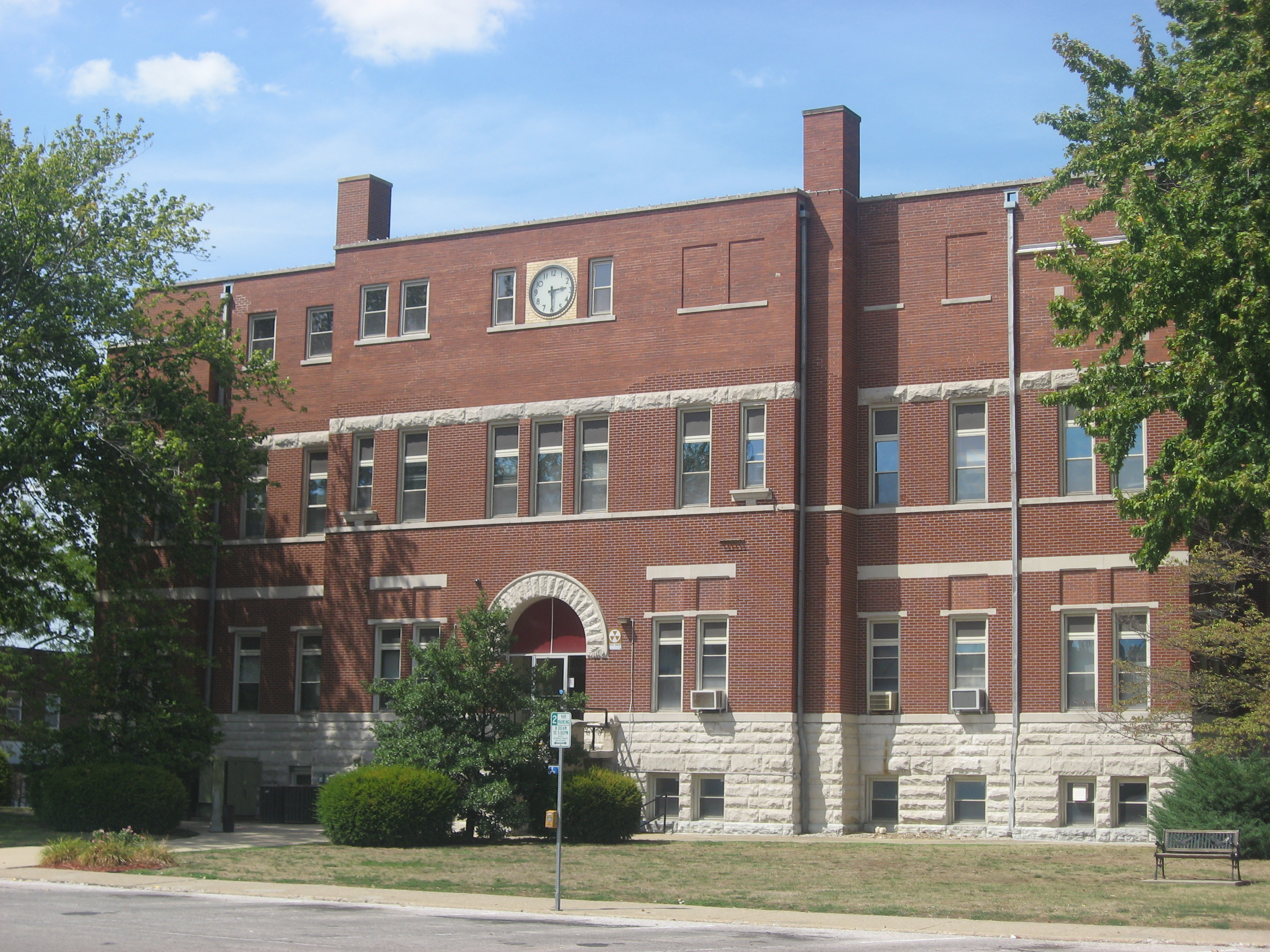
- Crawford County Courthouse in Robinson

- Location within the U.S. state of Illinois
- Coordinates: 39°00′N 87°46′W
- Country: United States
- State: Illinois
- Founded: 1816
- Named for: William H. Crawford
- Seat: Robinson
- Largest city: Robinson

Area
  - Total: 446 sq mi (1,160 km^{2})
  - Land: 444 sq mi (1,150 km^{2})
  - Water: 2.2 sq mi (5.7 km^{2}) 0.5%

Population (2020)
  - Total: 18,679
  - Estimate (2025): 18,648 ▼
  - Density: 41.4/sq mi (16.0/km^{2})
- Time zone: UTC−6 (Central)
  - Summer (DST): UTC−5 (CDT)
- Congressional district: 12th
- Website: crawfordcountyil.org

Crawford County is a county located in the U.S. state of Illinois. As of the 2020 census, the population was 18,679. Its county seat is Robinson.

== History ==
Crawford County was formed in the Illinois Territory on December 31, 1816, out of Edwards County. At the time of its formation, it encompassed about one third of the territory of what is now Illinois, as well as large parts of what are now Wisconsin and the Upper Peninsula of Michigan. Crawford was reduced to its present borders by 1831 as it spawned new counties. It was named in honor of William H. Crawford, from Georgia, who was serving as Secretary of War and Secretary of the Treasury at the time. Crawford County was home to several battles between the settlers and Indians, and also the location of the only woman ever hanged in Illinois.

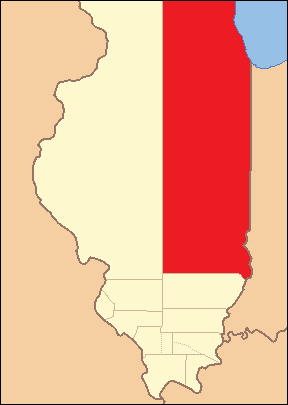
Crawford County when it was created in 1816, extending north to Lake Superior.

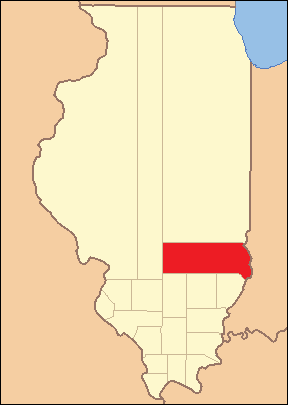
Crawford County between 1819 and 1821

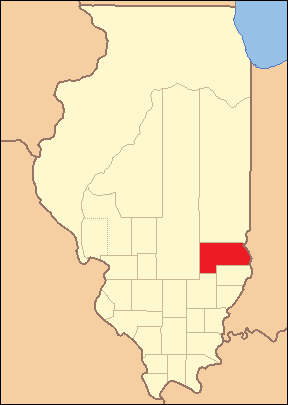
Crawford between 1821 and 1824

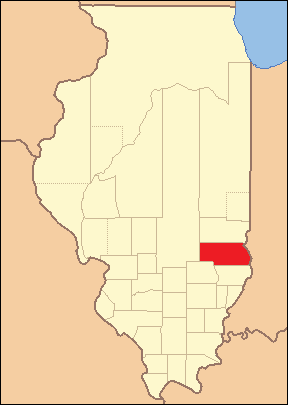
Crawford between 1824 and 1831

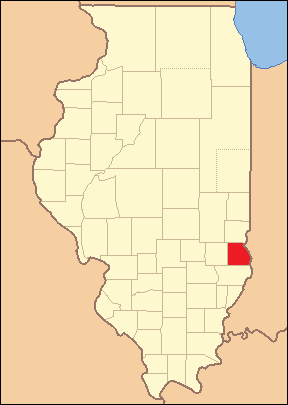
In 1831, the creation of Jasper and Effingham Counties reduced Crawford to its current size.

In 1818, the town of Palestine was designated as the county seat. After elections in 1843, a new site was chosen, which would become the town of Robinson.

== Geography ==
According to the U.S. Census Bureau, the county has a total area of 446 square miles (1,160 km^{2}), of which 444 square miles (1,150 km^{2}) is land and 2.2 square miles (5.7 km^{2}) (0.5%) is water. Some of the county's eastern border is defined by the Wabash River.

=== Climate and weather ===
Robinson, Illinois

Climate chart (precipitation, max. and min. temperature)
J	F	M	A	M	J	J	A	S	O	N	D
2.5 37 21	2.6 44 26	3.8 55 35	4 66 44	4.7 77 54	3.8 85 64	4.2 89 67	3.8 87 65	3.5 81 57	3 69 45	3.9 54 37	3.2 42 26
- █ Average max. and min. temperatures in °F
- █ Precipitation totals in inches
- Source: The Weather Channel
Metric conversion
J	F	M	A	M	J	J	A	S	O	N	D
62 3 −6	66 7 −3	97 13 2	102 19 7	119 25 12	97 29 18	108 32 19	96 31 18	89 27 14	77 21 7	98 12 3	80 6 −3
- █ Average max. and min. temperatures in °C
- █ Precipitation totals in mm

In recent years, average temperatures in the county seat of Robinson have ranged from a low of 21 °F (−6 °C) in January to a high of 89 °F (32 °C) in July, although a record low of −23 °F (−31 °C) was recorded in December 1989 and a record high of 114 °F (46 °C) was recorded in July 1954. Average monthly precipitation ranged from 2.45 inches (62 mm) in January to 4.67 inches (119 mm) in May.

=== Adjacent counties ===
- Clark County - north
- Sullivan County, Indiana - east
- Knox County, Indiana - southeast
- Lawrence County - south
- Richland County - southwest
- Jasper County - west

=== Transit ===
- Rides Mass Transit District

=== Major highways ===
- Illinois Route 1
- Illinois Route 33

== Demographics ==
Historical population
Census	Pop.	Note	%±
1820	3,022		—
1830	3,117		3.1%
1840	4,422		41.9%
1850	7,135		61.4%
1860	11,551		61.9%
1870	13,889		20.2%
1880	16,197		16.6%
1890	17,283		6.7%
1900	19,240		11.3%
1910	26,281		36.6%
1920	22,771		−13.4%
1930	21,085		−7.4%
1940	21,294		1.0%
1950	21,137		−0.7%
1960	20,751		−1.8%
1970	19,824		−4.5%
1980	20,818		5.0%
1990	19,464		−6.5%
2000	20,452		5.1%
2010	19,817		−3.1%
2020	18,679		−5.7%
2025 (est.)	18,648	▼	−0.2%
U.S. Decennial Census; 1790-1960 1900-1990; 1990-2000 2010-2020

2000 census age pyramid for Crawford County

=== 2020 census ===
As of the 2020 census, the county had a population of 18,679. The median age was 43.1 years. 20.3% of residents were under the age of 18 and 21.0% of residents were 65 years of age or older. For every 100 females there were 109.9 males, and for every 100 females age 18 and over there were 110.5 males age 18 and over.

The racial makeup of the county was 91.2% White, 3.3% Black or African American, 0.2% American Indian and Alaska Native, 0.5% Asian, <0.1% Native Hawaiian and Pacific Islander, 1.4% from some other race, and 3.4% from two or more races. Hispanic or Latino residents of any race comprised 2.4% of the population.

32.8% of residents lived in urban areas, while 67.2% lived in rural areas.

There were 7,471 households in the county, of which 27.4% had children under the age of 18 living in them. Of all households, 50.8% were married-couple households, 18.4% were households with a male householder and no spouse or partner present, and 23.9% were households with a female householder and no spouse or partner present. About 30.2% of all households were made up of individuals and 15.4% had someone living alone who was 65 years of age or older.

There were 8,471 housing units, of which 11.8% were vacant. Among occupied housing units, 79.9% were owner-occupied and 20.1% were renter-occupied. The homeowner vacancy rate was 2.8% and the rental vacancy rate was 13.5%.

=== Racial and ethnic composition ===
Crawford County County, Illinois – Racial and ethnic composition Note: the US Census treats Hispanic/Latino as an ethnic category. This table excludes Latinos from the racial categories and assigns them to a separate category. Hispanics/Latinos may be of any race.
Race / Ethnicity (NH = Non-Hispanic)	Pop 1980	Pop 1990	Pop 2000	Pop 2010	Pop 2020	% 1980	% 1990	% 2000	% 2010	% 2020
White alone (NH)	20,610	19,235	18,925	18,216	16,941	99.00%	98.82%	92.53%	91.92%	90.70%
Black or African American alone (NH)	32	62	920	923	608	0.15%	0.32%	4.50%	4.66%	3.25%
Native American or Alaska Native alone (NH)	27	34	51	42	36	0.13%	0.17%	0.25%	0.21%	0.19%
Asian alone (NH)	49	47	70	100	76	0.24%	0.24%	0.34%	0.50%	0.41%
Native Hawaiian or Pacific Islander alone (NH)	x	x	2	7	2	x	x	0.01%	0.04%	0.01%
Other race alone (NH)	23	6	5	7	29	0.11%	0.03%	0.02%	0.04%	0.16%
Mixed race or Multiracial (NH)	x	x	128	160	540	x	x	0.63%	0.81%	2.89%
Hispanic or Latino (any race)	77	80	351	362	447	0.37%	0.41%	1.72%	1.83%	2.39%
Total	20,818	19,464	20,452	19,817	18,679	100.00%	100.00%	100.00%	100.00%	100.00%

=== 2010 census ===
As of the 2010 United States census, there were 19,817 people, 7,763 households, and 5,154 families living in the county. The population density was 44.7 inhabitants per square mile (17.3/km^{2}). There were 8,661 housing units at an average density of 19.5 per square mile (7.5/km^{2}). The racial makeup of the county was 92.8% white, 4.7% black or African American, 0.5% Asian, 0.2% American Indian, 0.8% from other races, and 0.9% from two or more races. Those of Hispanic or Latino origin made up 1.8% of the population. In terms of ancestry, 25.0% were German, 14.4% were American, 12.4% were Irish, and 9.9% were English.

Of the 7,763 households, 28.5% had children under the age of 18 living with them, 52.6% were married couples living together, 9.4% had a female householder with no husband present, 33.6% were non-families, and 29.1% of all households were made up of individuals. The average household size was 2.36 and the average family size was 2.88. The median age was 41.7 years.

The median income for a household in the county was $41,434 and the median income for a family was $51,218. Males had a median income of $40,050 versus $30,870 for females. The per capita income for the county was $21,545. About 11.1% of families and 16.9% of the population were below the poverty line, including 27.0% of those under age 18 and 8.2% of those age 65 or over.

== Communities ==
=== Cities ===
- Robinson (seat)

=== Villages ===
- Flat Rock
- Hutsonville
- Oblong
- Palestine
- Stoy

=== Census-designated places ===
- Annapolis
- West York

=== Townships ===
Crawford County is divided into ten townships:

- Honey Creek
- Hutsonville
- Lamotte
- Licking
- Martin
- Montgomery
- Oblong
- Prairie
- Robinson
- Southwest

=== Unincorporated communities ===
- Bellair
- Dogwood
- Duncanville
- Gordon
- Green Brier
- Hardinville
- Heathsville
- Kibbie
- Landes
- Morea
- New Hebron
- Oil Center
- Oil Grove
- Pierceburg
- Port Jackson
- Porterville
- Richwoods
- Riddleville
- Trimble
- Villas

== Politics ==
Although Crawford County was solidly Democratic before the Populist-backed candidacy of William Jennings Bryan in 1896, it has since become strongly Republican. The last Democrat to gain a majority in the county was Lyndon Johnson in his 1964 landslide, although Bill Clinton won a plurality in 1992. Like all the rural Upland South, Crawford County has shown dramatic swings against the Democratic Party in recent elections, with Hillary Clinton’s 22.8 percent in 2016 the worst performance ever by a Democrat. President Donald J. Trump won Crawford County by historic landslides in 2016, 2020, and 2024. His percentage of the vote, 75.13%, in 2024, was the highest ever received by any presidential candidate in the history of Crawford County.

United States presidential election results for Crawford County, Illinois
Year	Republican		Democratic		Third party(ies)	
Year	No.	%	No.	%	No.	%
1892	1,790	45.44%	1,875	47.60%	274	6.96%
1896	2,172	47.66%	2,342	51.39%	43	0.94%
1900	2,301	49.11%	2,299	49.07%	85	1.81%
1904	2,296	51.85%	1,850	41.78%	282	6.37%
1908	3,090	49.42%	2,890	46.23%	272	4.35%
1912	1,266	22.30%	2,691	47.41%	1,719	30.29%
1916	5,084	46.28%	5,570	50.71%	331	3.01%
1920	5,188	55.02%	4,092	43.39%	150	1.59%
1924	4,830	51.25%	4,223	44.81%	372	3.95%
1928	5,989	62.90%	3,495	36.70%	38	0.40%
1932	4,550	42.13%	6,081	56.31%	169	1.56%
1936	5,823	48.13%	6,164	50.95%	112	0.93%
1940	7,036	54.95%	5,703	44.54%	66	0.52%
1944	6,056	57.04%	4,482	42.22%	79	0.74%
1948	5,111	54.58%	4,150	44.32%	103	1.10%
1952	6,768	63.11%	3,947	36.81%	9	0.08%
1956	6,747	63.28%	3,906	36.63%	9	0.08%
1960	6,809	61.58%	4,245	38.39%	4	0.04%
1964	4,834	46.22%	5,624	53.78%	0	0.00%
1968	5,870	58.13%	3,383	33.50%	845	8.37%
1972	6,568	65.32%	3,477	34.58%	10	0.10%
1976	5,522	51.99%	5,007	47.14%	93	0.88%
1980	5,894	60.70%	3,372	34.73%	444	4.57%
1984	6,261	66.44%	3,130	33.21%	33	0.35%
1988	4,951	57.76%	3,555	41.48%	65	0.76%
1992	3,606	37.29%	3,964	40.99%	2,101	21.72%
1996	3,965	45.61%	3,627	41.72%	1,101	12.67%
2000	4,974	58.52%	3,333	39.21%	193	2.27%
2004	6,083	65.18%	3,194	34.23%	55	0.59%
2008	5,070	55.39%	3,883	42.42%	200	2.19%
2012	5,585	64.69%	2,858	33.11%	190	2.20%
2016	6,277	71.83%	1,992	22.79%	470	5.38%
2020	7,043	74.60%	2,202	23.32%	196	2.08%
2024	6,727	75.13%	2,048	22.87%	179	2.00%

== See also ==
- Fort Lamotte
- National Register of Historic Places listings in Crawford County, Illinois

== Sources ==
- Perrin, William Henry, ed.. History of Crawford and Clark Counties, Illinois Chicago, Illinois. O. L. Baskin & Co. (1883).
