= Red Hill Community Unit School District 10 =

School district in Illinois, United States

Address
- 1250 Judy Avenue Bridgeport, Illinois, 62417; United States

District information
- Type: Public
- Grades: PreK–12
- NCES District ID: 1722130

Students and staff
- Students: 938 (2020–2021)

Other information
- Website: cusd10.org

Red Hill Community Unit School District 10 is a unified school district located in Lawrence County, Illinois.

Bridgeport Grade School (BGS) serves students from pre-K to third grade. It is headed by principal Tony Gaither.

Sumner Attendance Center (SAC) serves students from fourth grade to sixth grade. It is headed by principal Todd Tiffany.

Red Hill Junior Senior High School (RHJSHS) the last branch serves students from 7th grade to 12th grade. It is headed by principal Clearance Gross. The superintendent is Jakie Walker.
