= Porterville, Illinois =

- Unincorporated community
- Location within Illinois Location within the United States
- Coordinates: 39°05′23″N 87°48′05″W
- Country: United States
- State: Illinois
- County: Crawford
- Elevation: 541 ft (165 m)
- Time zone: UTC-6 (Central (CST))
  - Summer (DST): UTC-5 (CDT)
- Area code: 618
- GNIS feature ID: 416048

Porterville, also known as Eaton, is an unincorporated community in Crawford County, Illinois, United States. Porterville is 6 miles (9.7 km) north-northwest of Robinson. The community was platted as East Berlin and first saw growth when Richard Porter opened a blacksmith shop there in 1850. A post office opened under the name Eaton in 1852 and closed at a later date.
