= Gordon, Illinois =

- Unincorporated community
- Location within Illinois Location within the United States
- Coordinates: 39°00′29″N 87°41′05″W
- Country: United States
- State: Illinois
- County: Crawford
- Elevation: 489 ft (149 m)
- Time zone: UTC-6 (Central (CST))
  - Summer (DST): UTC-5 (CDT)
- Area code: 618
- GNIS feature ID: 409195

Gordon is an unincorporated community in Crawford County, Illinois, United States. Gordon is located at the junction of Illinois Route 1 and Illinois Route 33, 3 miles (4.8 km) east of Robinson.
