= Lawrence County Community Unit School District 20 =

School district in Lawrence County, Illinois, United States

Address
- 1802 Cedar Street Lawrenceville, Illinois, 62439; United States

District information
- Type: Public
- Grades: PreK–12
- NCES District ID: 1722150

Students and staff
- Students: 1,173 (2020–2021)

Other information
- Website: www.cusd20.com

Community Unit School District 20 is a unified school district located in the southern Illinois town of Lawrenceville, the county seat of Lawrence County. Altogether, the district has three schools: one elementary school, one middle school, and one high school. The district elementary school, Parkside Elementary School, serves kindergarten through grade five. The school is run by principal Julie Hayes. Parkview Junior High School, which educates students in grades six through eight, is run by Jeremy Brush. Lawrenceville High School, originally known as Lawrence Township High School, is the last branch of education in the district. It serves grades nine through twelve, and is headed by Paul Higginbotham. The district superintendent is Doug Daugherty.

== Clubs and Activities ==
Lawrenceville High School is home to a variety of clubs, including a National Beta Club, an FFA club, a Spanish club, a drama club, and a varsity Scholastic Bowl team. The high school also runs a choir and band. Parkview Junior High School also sports a Beta Club, and a Scholastic Bowl team, although it is by limited in comparison to the number of clubs at Lawrenceville High School. They also have many sport including a girls and boys basketball team, a baseball and softball team, a wrestling team, color guard team, and a cheer team. They also have a band
