= Stoy, Illinois =

- Location of Stoy in Crawford County, Illinois.

- Location within the state of Illinois
- Coordinates: 38°59′48″N 87°50′01″W
- Country: United States
- State: Illinois
- County: Crawford County

Area
  - Total: 0.93 sq mi (2.42 km^{2})
  - Land: 0.93 sq mi (2.42 km^{2})
  - Water: 0 sq mi (0.00 km^{2})
- Elevation: 466 ft (142 m)

Population (2020)
  - Total: 108
  - Density: 115.8/sq mi (44.72/km^{2})
- Time zone: UTC-6 (CST)
  - Summer (DST): UTC-5 (CDT)
- Zip code: 62454
- FIPS code: 17–73027
- GNIS feature ID: 2399913

Stoy is a village in Crawford County, Illinois, United States. The population was 108 at the 2020 census.

== Geography ==
Illinois Route 33 runs along the northern border of the village, leading east 5 miles (8 km) to Robinson, the county seat, and west 4 miles (6 km) to Oblong.

According to the 2021 census gazetteer files, Stoy has a total area of 0.93 square miles (2.41 km^{2}), all land.

== Demographics ==
Historical population
Census	Pop.	Note	%±
1910	488		—
1920	249		−49.0%
1930	176		−29.3%
1940	150		−14.8%
1950	161		7.3%
1960	185		14.9%
1970	199		7.6%
1980	167		−16.1%
1990	135		−19.2%
2000	119		−11.9%
2010	104		−12.6%
2020	108		3.8%
U.S. Decennial Census

As of the 2020 census there were 108 people, 65 households, and 55 families residing in the village. The population density was 115.88 inhabitants per square mile (44.74/km^{2}). There were 49 housing units at an average density of 52.58 units per square mile (20.30 units/km^{2}). The racial makeup of the village was 96.30% White and 3.70% from two or more races. None of the population was Hispanic or Latino of any race.

There were 65 households, out of which 53.8% had children under the age of 18 living with them, 76.92% were married couples living together, none had a female householder with no husband present, and 15.38% were non-families. 15.38% of all households were made up of individuals, and 4.62% had someone living alone who was 65 years of age or older. The average household size was 2.42 and the average family size was 2.25.

The village's age distribution consisted of 19.9% under the age of 18, 19.2% from 18 to 24, 16.4% from 25 to 44, 35.6% from 45 to 64, and 8.9% who were 65 years of age or older. The median age was 40.6 years. For every 100 females, there were 156.1 males. For every 100 females age 18 and over, there were 129.4 males.

The median income for a household in the village was $75,208, and the median income for a family was $65,764. Males had a median income of $35,096 versus $25,833 for females. The per capita income for the village was $27,947. No families and 1.4% of the population were below the poverty line, including none of those under age 18 and none of those age 65 or over.
