= Flat Rock, Illinois =

- City
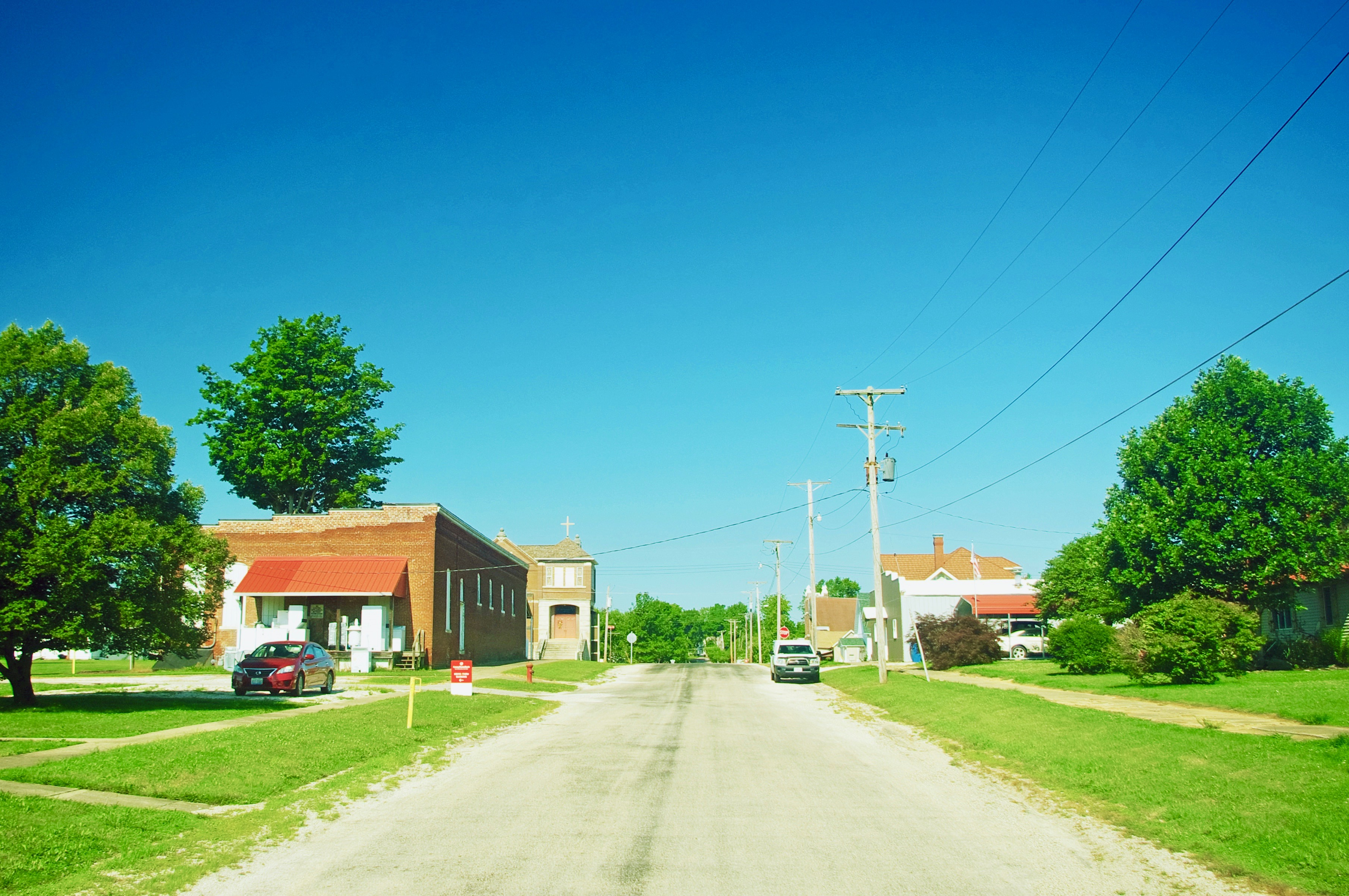
- First Street

- Location of Flat Rock in Crawford County, Illinois.
- Coordinates: 38°54′13″N 87°40′24″W
- Country: United States
- State: Illinois
- County: Crawford

Area
  - Total: 0.86 sq mi (2.22 km^{2})
  - Land: 0.86 sq mi (2.22 km^{2})
  - Water: 0 sq mi (0.00 km^{2})
- Elevation: 502 ft (153 m)

Population (2020)
  - Total: 323
  - Density: 377/sq mi (145.7/km^{2})
- Time zone: UTC-6 (CST)
  - Summer (DST): UTC-5 (CDT)
- ZIP code: 62427
- Area code: 618
- FIPS code: 17-26350
- GNIS feature ID: 2398883

Flat Rock is a village in Crawford County, Illinois, United States. The population was 323 at the 2020 census.

== History ==
Flat Rock was established in 1876 by John W. Jones, a merchant who would operate the first general store in the village.

== Geography ==
Flat Rock is located in southern Crawford County. Illinois State Route 1 passes just west of the village, leading north 34 miles (55 km) to Marshall and south 12 miles (19 km) to Lawrenceville. Robinson, the Crawford County seat, is 10 miles (16 km) northwest of Flat Rock via IL 1 and Illinois State Route 33.

According to the 2010 census, Flat Rock has a total area of 0.86 square miles (2.23 km^{2}), all land.

== Demographics ==
Historical population
| Census | Pop. | Note | %± |
|---|---|---|---|
| 1880 | 140 | | — |
| 1890 | 151 | | 7.9% |
| 1900 | 315 | | 108.6% |
| 1910 | 840 | | 166.7% |
| 1920 | 745 | | −11.3% |
| 1930 | 584 | | −21.6% |
| 1940 | 585 | | 0.2% |
| 1950 | 558 | | −4.6% |
| 1960 | 497 | | −10.9% |
| 1970 | 504 | | 1.4% |
| 1980 | 493 | | −2.2% |
| 1990 | 421 | | −14.6% |
| 2000 | 415 | | −1.4% |
| 2010 | 331 | | −20.2% |
| 2020 | 323 | | −2.4% |
U.S. Decennial Census

As of the 2020 census there were 323 people, 204 households, and 133 families residing in the village. The population density was 377.34 inhabitants per square mile (145.69/km^{2}). There were 148 housing units at an average density of 172.90 per square mile (66.76/km^{2}). The racial makeup of the village was 92.26% White, 0.93% African American, 0.31% Asian, 0.93% from other races, and 5.57% from two or more races. Hispanic or Latino of any race were 0.31% of the population.

There were 204 households, out of which 33.8% had children under the age of 18 living with them, 57.35% were married couples living together, 6.37% had a female householder with no husband present, and 34.80% were non-families. 33.82% of all households were made up of individuals, and 11.27% had someone living alone who was 65 years of age or older. The average household size was 2.86 and the average family size was 2.27.

The village's age distribution consisted of 20.5% under the age of 18, 13.8% from 18 to 24, 25.3% from 25 to 44, 24.3% from 45 to 64, and 15.9% who were 65 years of age or older. The median age was 34.7 years. For every 100 females, there were 78.5 males. For every 100 females age 18 and over, there were 94.2 males.

The median income for a household in the village was $41,071, and the median income for a family was $45,156. Males had a median income of $41,845 versus $24,531 for females. The per capita income for the village was $22,659. About 17.3% of families and 15.7% of the population were below the poverty line, including 13.7% of those under age 18 and 14.9% of those age 65 or over.

== Notable people ==
- Sammy L. Davis (born 1946), soldier of the United States Army awarded the Medal of Honor for heroic conduct during the Vietnam War. He resided in Flat Rock during the 1990s.
- George A. Taylor (1899–1969), officer of the United States Army who served as commander of the 16th Infantry Regiment during the Normandy landings.
