= Oblong, Illinois =

Oblong
- Village
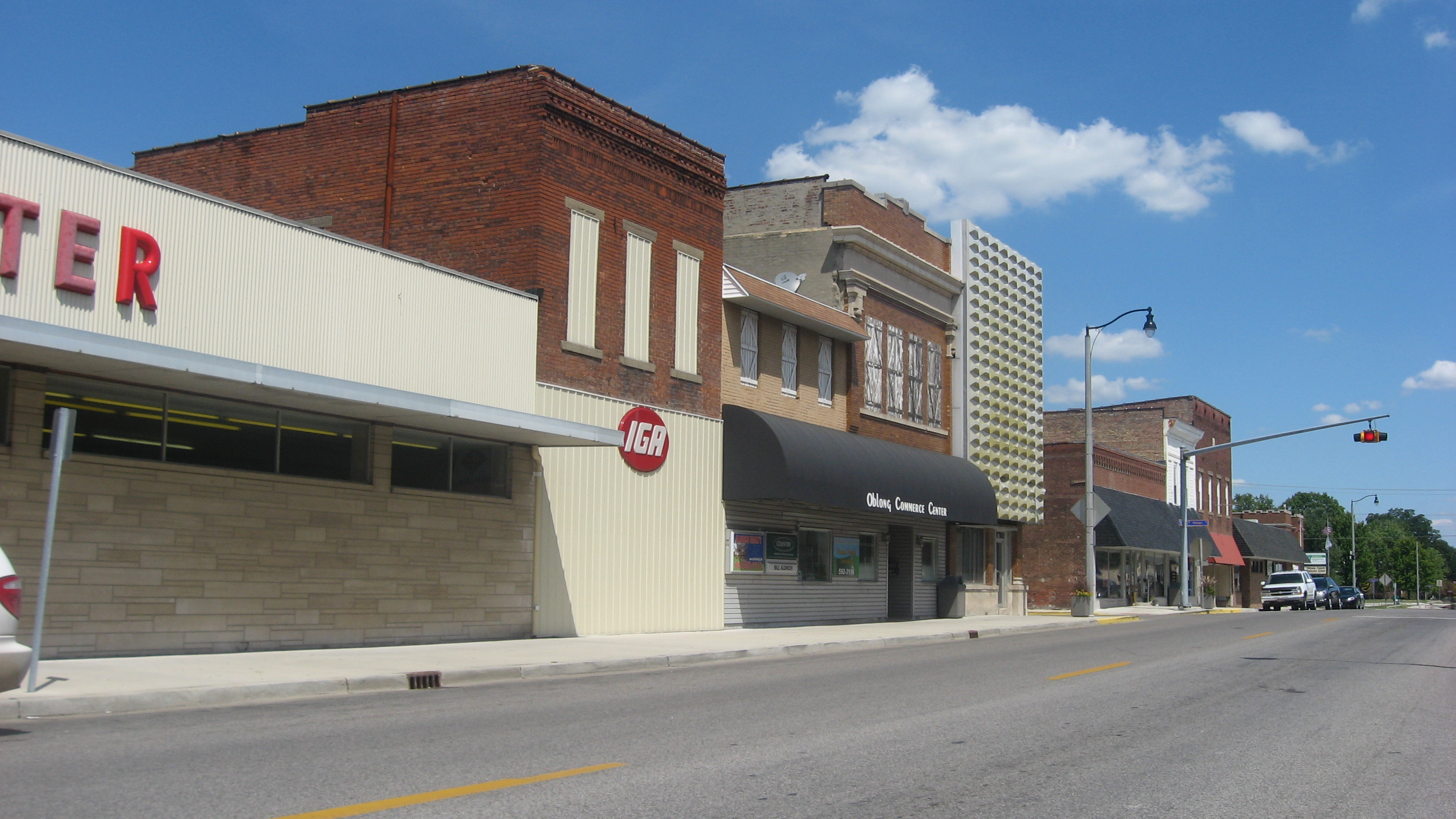
- West Main Street downtown

- Location of Oblong in Crawford County, Illinois.
- Coordinates: 39°00′02″N 87°54′32″W
- Country: United States
- State: Illinois
- County: Crawford

Area
  - Total: 1.09 sq mi (2.83 km^{2})
  - Land: 1.08 sq mi (2.81 km^{2})
  - Water: 0.0077 sq mi (0.02 km^{2})
- Elevation: 512 ft (156 m)

Population (2020)
  - Total: 1,371
  - Density: 1,263.0/sq mi (487.64/km^{2})
- Time zone: UTC-6 (CST)
  - Summer (DST): CDT
- ZIP code: 62449
- Area code: 618
- FIPS code: 17–55106
- GNIS feature ID: 2399553
- Website: http://www.villageofoblong.com/

Oblong is a village in Crawford County, Illinois, United States. The population was 1,466 at the 2010 census, and then was later recorded to be 1,371 in the 2020 census.

== History ==
Oblong was incorporated in 1883. The original town site was on a naturally occurring oblongular prairie, hence the name. The crossroads at the town site was the location of a general store owned by Henry Peck. The prominent sign "Hen. Peck" gave rise to the village's original moniker, Henpeck.

== Geography ==
According to the 2021 census gazetteer files, Oblong has a total area of 1.09 square miles (2.82 km^{2}), of which 1.09 square miles (2.82 km^{2}) (or 99.36%) is land and 0.01 square miles (0.03 km^{2}) (or 0.64%) is water.

== Demographics ==
Historical population
Census	Pop.	Note	%±
1890	390		—
1900	743		90.5%
1910	1,482		99.5%
1920	1,547		4.4%
1930	1,427		−7.8%
1940	1,547		8.4%
1950	1,639		5.9%
1960	1,817		10.9%
1970	1,860		2.4%
1980	1,840		−1.1%
1990	1,616		−12.2%
2000	1,580		−2.2%
2010	1,466		−7.2%
2020	1,371		−6.5%
U.S. Decennial Census

=== 2020 census ===
As of the 2020 census, Oblong had a population of 1,371 and 433 families. The population density was 1,254.35 inhabitants per square mile (484.31/km^{2}). The median age was 44.0 years. 20.6% of residents were under the age of 18 and 25.4% of residents were 65 years of age or older. For every 100 females there were 91.5 males, and for every 100 females age 18 and over there were 81.9 males age 18 and over.

0.0% of residents lived in urban areas, while 100.0% lived in rural areas.

There were 597 households in Oblong, of which 25.5% had children under the age of 18 living in them. Of all households, 41.5% were married-couple households, 18.3% were households with a male householder and no spouse or partner present, and 31.8% were households with a female householder and no spouse or partner present. About 35.1% of all households were made up of individuals and 19.3% had someone living alone who was 65 years of age or older.

There were 663 housing units at an average density of 606.59 units per square mile (234.21 units/km^{2}). Of the housing units, 10.0% were vacant. The homeowner vacancy rate was 2.2% and the rental vacancy rate was 2.4%.

Racial composition as of the 2020 census
Race	Number	Percent
White	1,311	95.6%
Black or African American	9	0.7%
American Indian and Alaska Native	4	0.3%
Asian	1	0.1%
Native Hawaiian and Other Pacific Islander	1	0.1%
Some other race	3	0.2%
Two or more races	42	3.1%
Hispanic or Latino (of any race)	15	1.1%

=== 2000 census ===
There were 766 households, out of which 36.7% had children under the age of 18 living with them, 40.60% were married couples living together, 10.84% had a female householder with no husband present, and 43.47% were non-families. 30.81% of all households were made up of individuals, and 12.01% had someone living alone who was 65 years of age or older. The average household size was 2.39 and the average family size was 1.90.

The village's age distribution consisted of 20.8% under the age of 18, 8.0% from 18 to 24, 32.6% from 25 to 44, 19.3% from 45 to 64, and 19.1% who were 65 years of age or older. The median age was 34.9 years. For every 100 females, there were 92.4 males. For every 100 females age 18 and over, there were 81.3 males.

The median income for a household in the village was $47,560, and the median income for a family was $49,279. Males had a median income of $33,208 versus $14,938 for females. The per capita income for the village was $21,621. About 10.2% of families and 20.1% of the population were below the poverty line, including 16.7% of those under age 18 and 12.4% of those age 65 or over.

== Arts and culture ==
It is the home of the Illinois Oil Field Museum and Resource Center, a collection of early oilfield artifacts from the early days of the oil industry in the Illinois Basin and a resource center featuring a collection of early oil field records and resource books.

== Education ==
Oblong has one public four-year high school and one public grade school.
