= Robinson Community Unit School District 2 =

School district in Crawford County, Illinois, United States

Address
- 1301 North Allen Street Robinson, Illinois, 62454; United States

District information
- Type: Public
- Grades: PreK–12
- NCES District ID: 1734230

Students and staff
- Students: 1,580

Other information
- Website: www.robinsonschools.com

Robinson Community Unit School District 2 (Robinson CUSD #2) is a school district headquartered in Robinson, Illinois, United States.

As of 2026 the superintendent is Kyle Klier.

The first high school was established in 1885, and a one room schoolhouse already existed at that time.

== Schools ==
- Robinson High School
- Nuttall Middle School
- Lincoln Grade School (grades 3–5)
- Washington Elementary School (grades PreK-2)
