= Southern Illinois chowder =

American chowder

- Type: Soup or stew
- Place of origin: United States
- Region or state: Illinois
- Main ingredients: Beef, chicken, tomatoes, cabbage, lima beans, green beans

Southern Illinois chowder is a thick stew or soup, very different from the New England and Manhattan chowders. In Edwards County, Illinois, it refers to both the food and to the social gathering at which it is prepared and served. It is believed to have been brought to the area by the earliest settlers, or "backwoodsmen". Traditionally, the chowder time season commences when the first tomatoes ripen and closes with the first heavy frost. Possibly brought from Virginia and the Carolina's as their version is called Brunswick Stew.

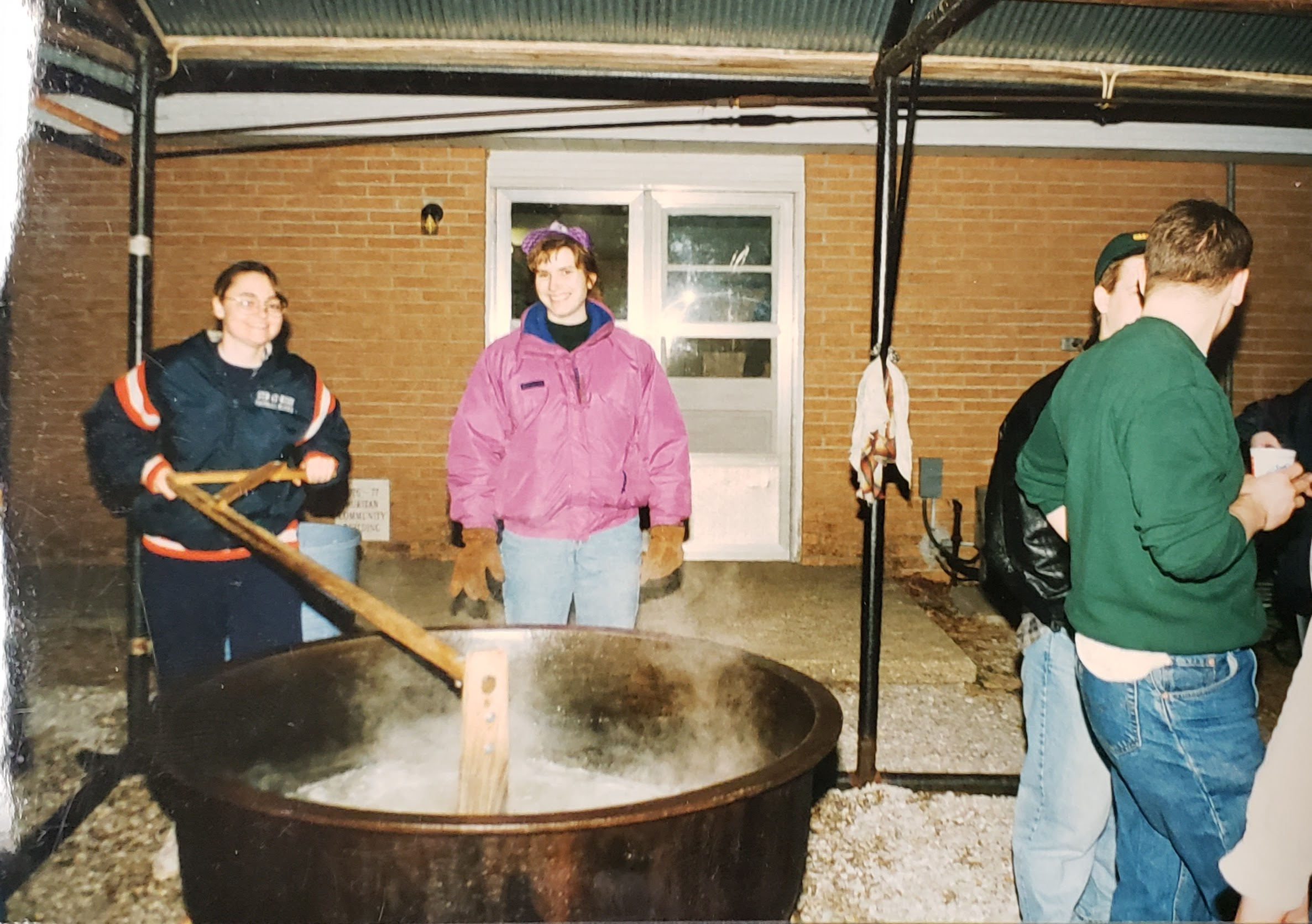
Chowder preparation at the Claremont Ruritan Club

== Etymology ==
The term "chowder" is derived from French chaudière 'stew pot', partially cognate with cauldron.

== Preparation ==
Chowder is usually cooked outside in large black kettles or cauldrons, ranging in size from 20 to 70 gallons. The ingredients are added to boiling water according to their cooking time, so that all are cooked and ready at the same time. The main ingredients are beef, chicken, tomatoes, cabbage, lima beans, and green beans. Traditionally, squirrel meat was a common addition. Chowder is usually considered ready when the ingredients have amalgamated into a fairly thick soup, usually taking four or more hours. The kettles must be stirred almost continuously so that the chowder does not "catch" on the base and scorch. This is accomplished using a wooden blade known as a "paddle". Measuring between eighteen and twenty-four inches long and six to eight inches wide, a paddle has had several bored holes through the blade and a handle attached at right angles. One cook will paddle the chowder, causing the bones to rise, and another cook, the "bone picker", will use tongs to pick out bones as they separate from the meat.

== Events ==
Towns that host chowder events include Elm River, Wynoose, Berryville, Noble, Claremont, Saint Francisville, Lancaster, Dundas, West Salem, Newton, Albion, Mount Carmel, and Bone Gap.

In 1958, the County Commissioners of Edwards County, Illinois, proclaimed their county the "Chowder Capital of the World." The city of Albion has also claimed the title of "Chowder Capital of the World".

== See also ==
- Brunswick stew, a stew historically made with squirrel meat
- Burgoo, a traditional Mid-South stew now made in quantities at social gatherings
- Booyah, a stew popularly made and served at socials in Minnesota and Wisconsin
- List of soups
- List of stews
