= Bonpas Creek =

American tributary of the Wabash River

Physical characteristics
- Source
  - location: Richland County west of Olney, Illinois
  - coordinates: 38°44′36″N 87°58′44″W
- Mouth
  - location: Confluence with the Wabash River in Grayville, Illinois
  - coordinates: 38°15′28″N 87°59′23″W
  - elevation: 361 ft (110 m)
- Length: 58 mi (93 km)

Basin features
- Progression: Bonpas Creek → Wabash → Ohio → Mississippi → Gulf of Mexico
- GNIS ID: 404691

Bonpas Creek is a tributary of the Wabash River in Illinois. It rises to the east of Olney in Richland County, Illinois. Flowing south, it forms the boundary between Edwards and Wabash counties. The creek is 58.4 miles (94.0 km) long. It joins the Wabash near Grayville, Illinois. In the last 2 miles (3 km) of its watercourse, it occupies part of a former Wabash oxbow bend. As such, the creek now also forms part of the state boundary between White County, Illinois, and Gibson County, Indiana, as flows past Grayville in the former channel.

The name is derived from the early French settlers of the Illinois Country. The name probably means "good steps" or "good path". The name is pronounced locally as "Bom Paw".

Other locals such as those in nearby villages of Bone Gap, Browns, Bellmont and southern Illinois communities pronounce the name as Bum-paw, with the emphasis on the Bum. This pronunciation, though not completely true to the original French, is still much closer to the correct way to say the name. A legend about how Bum-paw got its name tells of an early pioneer father traveling in his wagon across the creek with his young son from their cabin to a nearby settlement. The father it is told gets his wagon and team of horses stuck in the creek. As he wades into the water it is said the young son is saying, "Bum-paw, Bum-paw" as the father pulls the team of horses and wagon across the creek.

== See also ==
- List of Illinois rivers
