= Chowder (disambiguation) =

Chowder may refer to:

- Chowder, any of a variety of soups
  - Bermuda fish chowder, a chowder containing fish, tomato, and onion
  - Clam chowder, a chowder containing clams and broth
  - Corn chowder, a chowder with corn, bacon, and broth
  - Southern Illinois chowder, a thick stew/soup
- Chowder (TV series), an animated television series created by C. H. Greenblatt
- California Clam Chowder, a 1992 album by Thelonious Monster
- Charles "Chowder" Peterson, a character in the 2006 film Monster House
