= Decker Township =

Decker Township may refer to the following townships in the United States:

- Decker Township, Richland County, Illinois
- Decker Township, Knox County, Indiana
