= Elbow, Illinois =

- Unincorporated community
- Location within Illinois Location within the United States
- Coordinates: 38°38′32″N 88°07′18″W
- Country: United States
- State: Illinois
- County: Richland
- Township: Madison
- Elevation: 440 ft (130 m)
- Time zone: UTC-6 (Central (CST))
  - Summer (DST): UTC-5 (CDT)
- Area code: 618
- GNIS feature ID: 407834

Elbow is an unincorporated community in Madison Township, Richland County, Illinois, United States.
