= Bonpas Township, Richland County, Illinois =

Bonpas Township
- Township
- Location of Illinois in the United States
- Coordinates: 38°36′30″N 87°58′00″W
- Country: United States
- State: Illinois
- County: Richland
- Settled: November 4, 1879

Area
  - Total: 37.53 sq mi (97.2 km^{2})
  - Land: 37.53 sq mi (97.2 km^{2})
  - Water: 0.01 sq mi (0.026 km^{2})
- Elevation: 420 ft (130 m)

Population (2010)
  - Estimate (2016): 385
  - Density: 10.4/sq mi (4.0/km^{2})
- Time zone: UTC-6 (CST)
  - Summer (DST): UTC-5 (CDT)
- FIPS code: 17-159-07289

Bonpas Township is located in Richland County, Illinois. As of the 2010 census, its population was 390 and it contained 160 housing units.

== History ==
Bonpas Township was formed after an 1858 election, in which county voters chose to adopt a township-based model of county government, in place of the old precinct-based system. Named for Bonpas Creek, which flows through its boundaries, the township was originally heavily wooded. Early settlers favored this part of Richland County above others, but as experience taught the value of flat prairie ahead of hilly woodlands, the township languished. Before the coming of the Ohio and Mississippi Railway, when good transportation was unavailable, most coal and stone used in Richland County came from Bonpas Township.

== Geography ==
According to the 2010 census, the township has a total area of 37.53 square miles (97.2 km^{2}), of which 37.53 square miles (97.2 km^{2}) (or 100%) is land and 0.01 square miles (0.026 km^{2}) (or 0.03%) is water.

== Demographics ==
Historical population
| Census | Pop. | Note | %± |
|---|---|---|---|
| 2016 (est.) | 385 |
U.S. Decennial Census
