= Claremont Township =

Claremont Township may refer to the following townships in the United States:

- Claremont Township, Richland County, Illinois
- Claremont Township, Dodge County, Minnesota
