= Olney Township =

Olney Township may refer to:

- Olney Township, Richland County, Illinois
- Olney Township, Nobles County, Minnesota
