= German Township, Richland County, Illinois =

German Township
- Township

- Location of Illinois in the United States
- Coordinates: 38°48′35″N 87°58′17″W
- Country: United States
- State: Illinois
- County: Richland
- Settled: November 4, 1879

Area
  - Total: 37.84 sq mi (98.0 km^{2})
  - Land: 37.82 sq mi (98.0 km^{2})
  - Water: 0.02 sq mi (0.052 km^{2})
- Elevation: 515 ft (157 m)

Population (2010)
  - Estimate (2016): 336
  - Density: 9/sq mi (3.5/km^{2})
- Time zone: UTC-6 (CST)
  - Summer (DST): UTC-5 (CDT)
- FIPS code: 17-159-29028

German Township is located in Richland County, Illinois. As of the 2010 census, its population was 341 and it contained 143 housing units. Before May 2, 1859, this locale was known as Troy Township.

== Geography ==
According to the 2010 census, the township has a total area of 37.84 square miles (98.0 km^{2}), of which 37.82 square miles (98.0 km^{2}) (or 99.95%) is land and 0.02 square miles (0.052 km^{2}) (or 0.05%) is water.

== Demographics ==
Historical population
Census	Pop.	Note	%±
2016 (est.)	336
U.S. Decennial Census
