= Wisconsin Walloon =

North American isolated variant of Walloon language

- Native to: United States
- Region: Door Peninsula, Wisconsin
- Ethnicity: Wisconsin Walloons
- Native speakers: <50 (2021)
- Language family: Indo-European: Italic; Latino-Faliscan; Latin; Romance; Italo-Western; Western Romance; Gallo-Iberian?; Gallo-Romance; Gallo-Rhaetian?; Arpitan–Oïl; Oïl; Walloon; Central; Wisconsin Walloon
- Early forms: Old Latin: Vulgar Latin; Proto-Romance; Old Gallo-Romance; Old French

Language codes
- ISO 639-3: –
- Glottolog: None

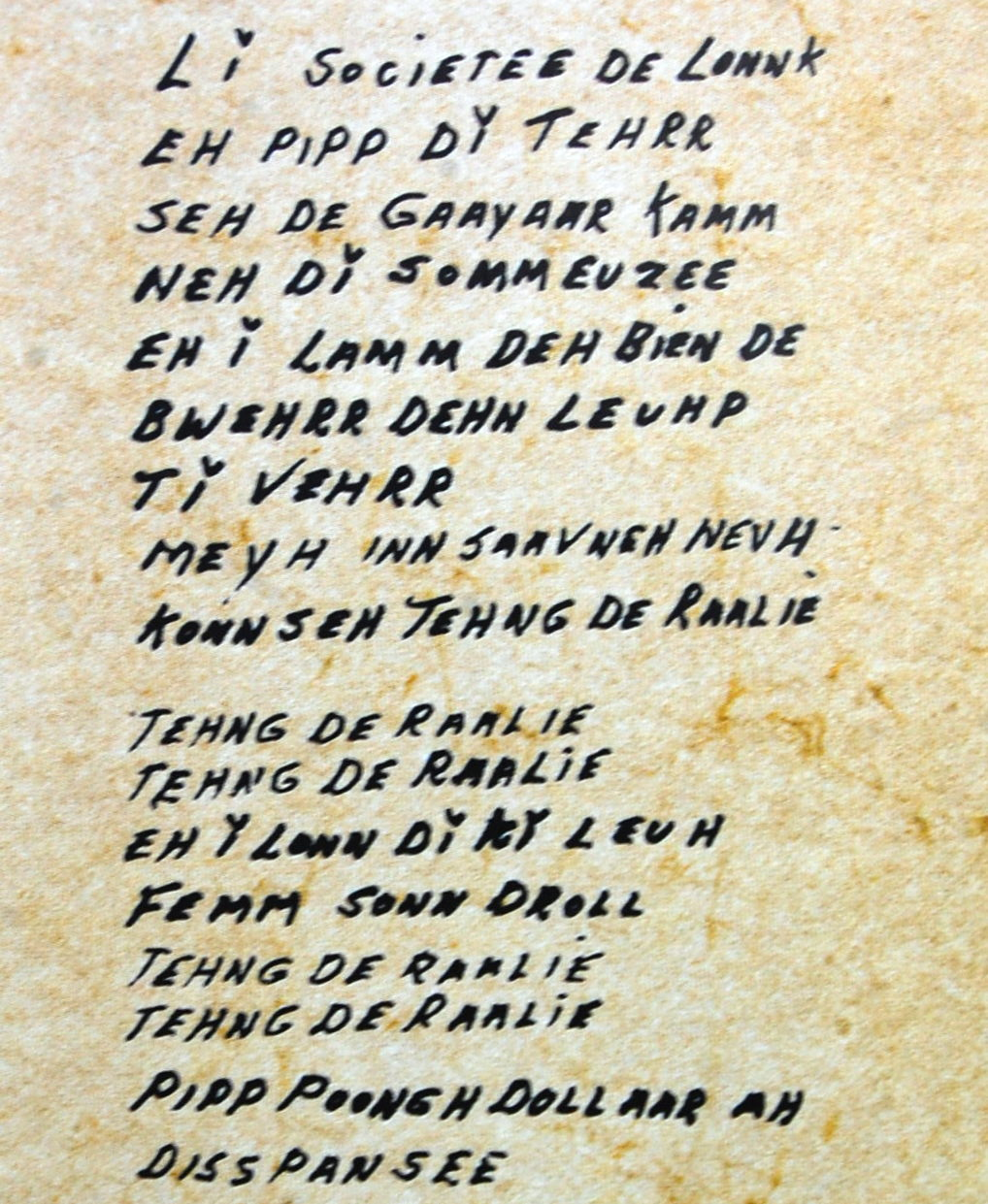
Lyrics to the song Tins d' eraler / Tehng de raalie "Time to go home" written from memory by a Walloon speaker in Wisconsin

Wisconsin Walloon is a dialect of the Walloon language brought to Wisconsin by immigrants from Wallonia, the largely Oïl-speaking region of Belgium. It is spoken in the Door Peninsula in Wisconsin, United States.

The speakers of Wisconsin Walloon are descendants of the Belgian immigrants that came from the wave of immigration lasting from 1853 to 1857 that was recorded to have brought around 2,000 Belgians to Wisconsin. It is sometimes referred to by its speakers in English as "Belgian". Walloons in Wisconsin and descendants of native Walloon speakers have since switched to English, and as of 2021, it has fewer than 50 speakers.

== Bibliography ==
- Biers, Kelly; Osterhaus, Ellen (2021). "Notes from the Field: Wisconsin Walloon Documentation and Orthography" (PDF). Language Documentation and Conservation. 15: 1–29.
