= Claremont, Illinois =

Claremont
- Village
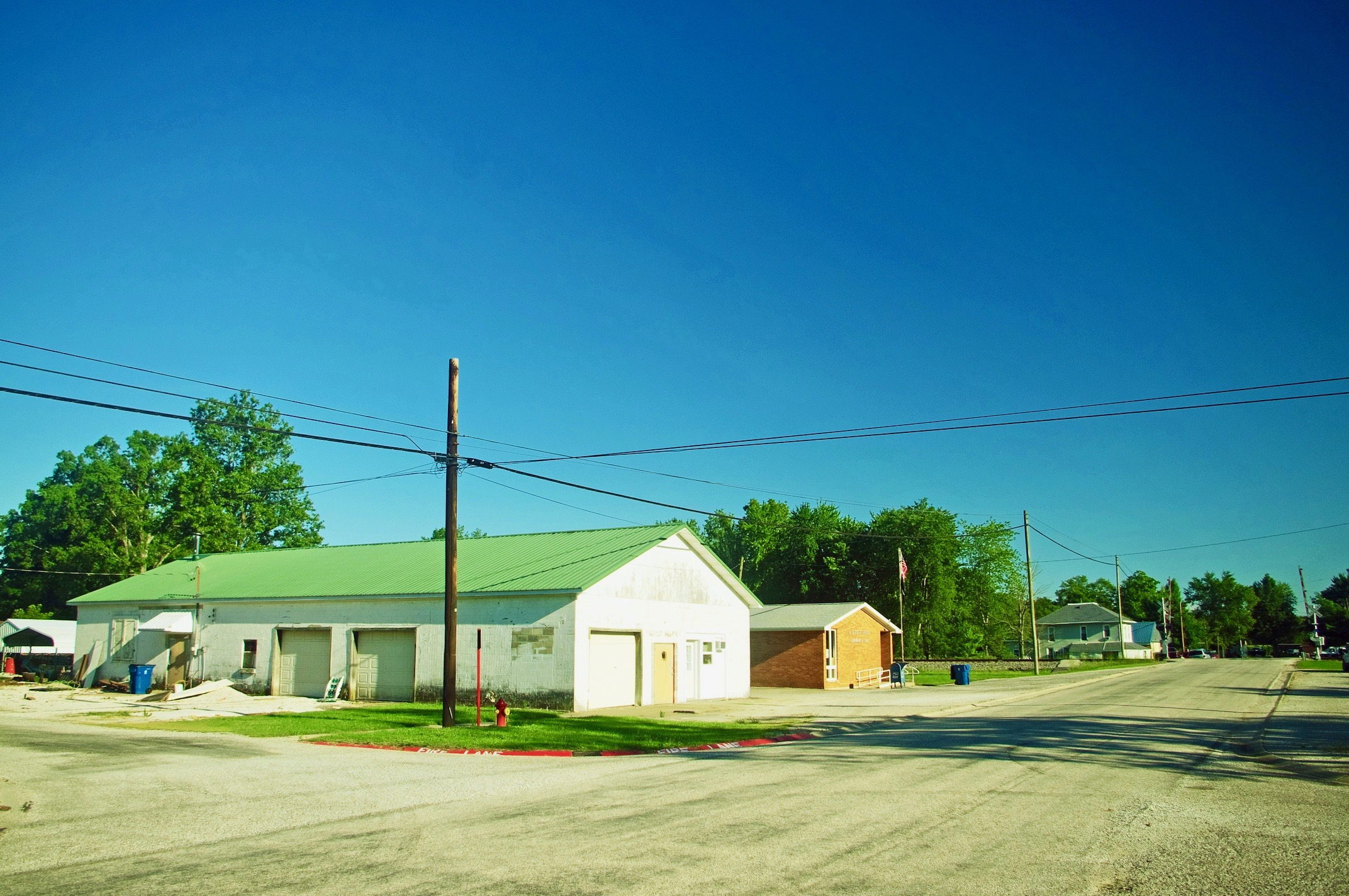
- Washington Street in Claremont, July 2020

- Location of Claremont in Richland County, Illinois.
- Coordinates: 38°43′03″N 87°58′22″W
- Country: United States
- State: Illinois
- County: Richland

Area
  - Total: 0.79 sq mi (2.05 km^{2})
  - Land: 0.79 sq mi (2.05 km^{2})
  - Water: 0 sq mi (0.00 km^{2})
- Elevation: 509 ft (155 m)

Population (2020)
  - Total: 161
  - Density: 203.0/sq mi (78.36/km^{2})
- Time zone: UTC-6 (CST)
  - Summer (DST): UTC-5 (CDT)
- ZIP code: 62421
- Area code: 618
- FIPS code: 17–14533
- GNIS feature ID: 2397628

Claremont is a village in Richland County, Illinois, United States. As of the 2020 census, Claremont had a population of 161.

== History ==
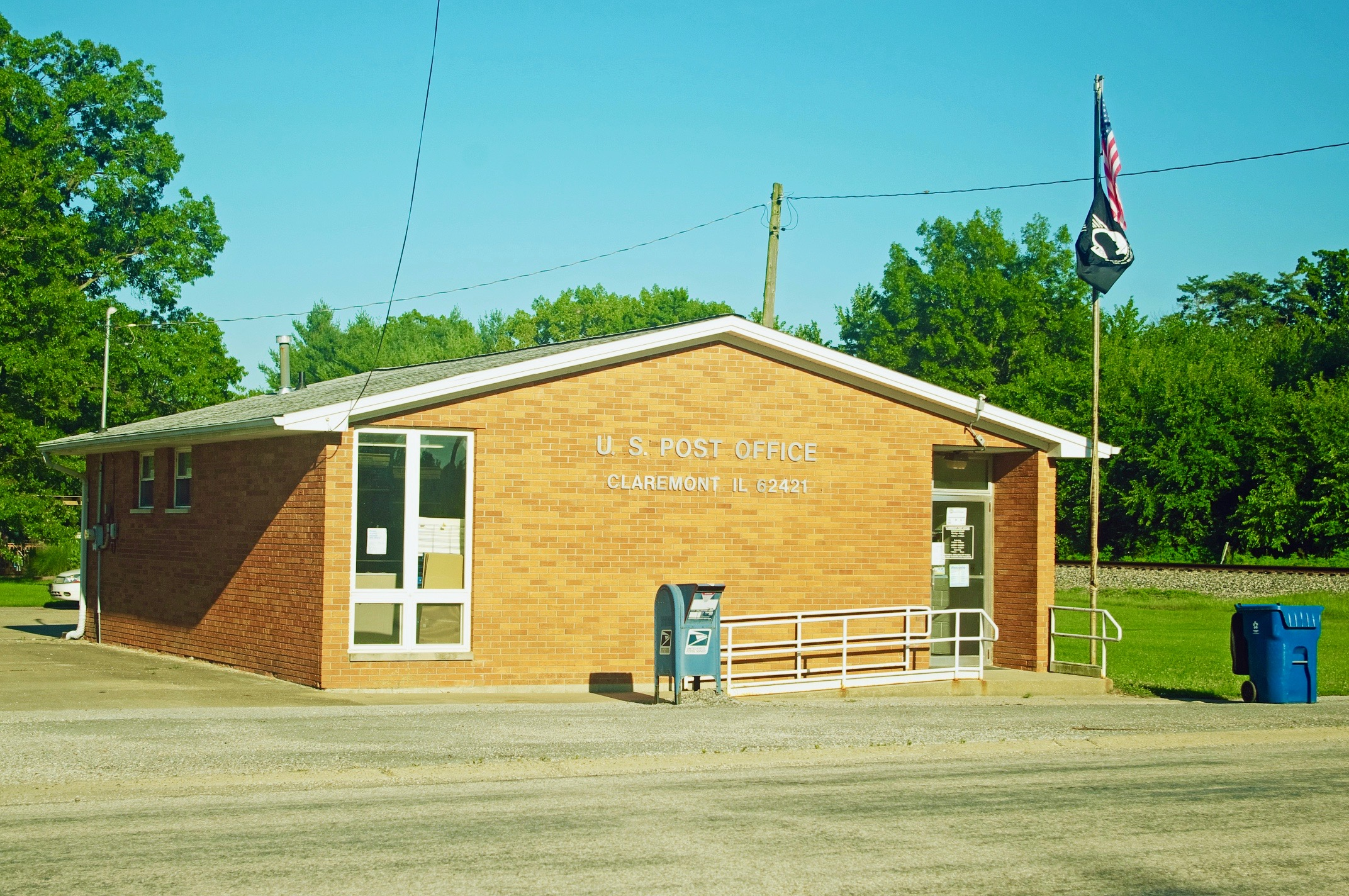
Claremont Post Office, July 2020

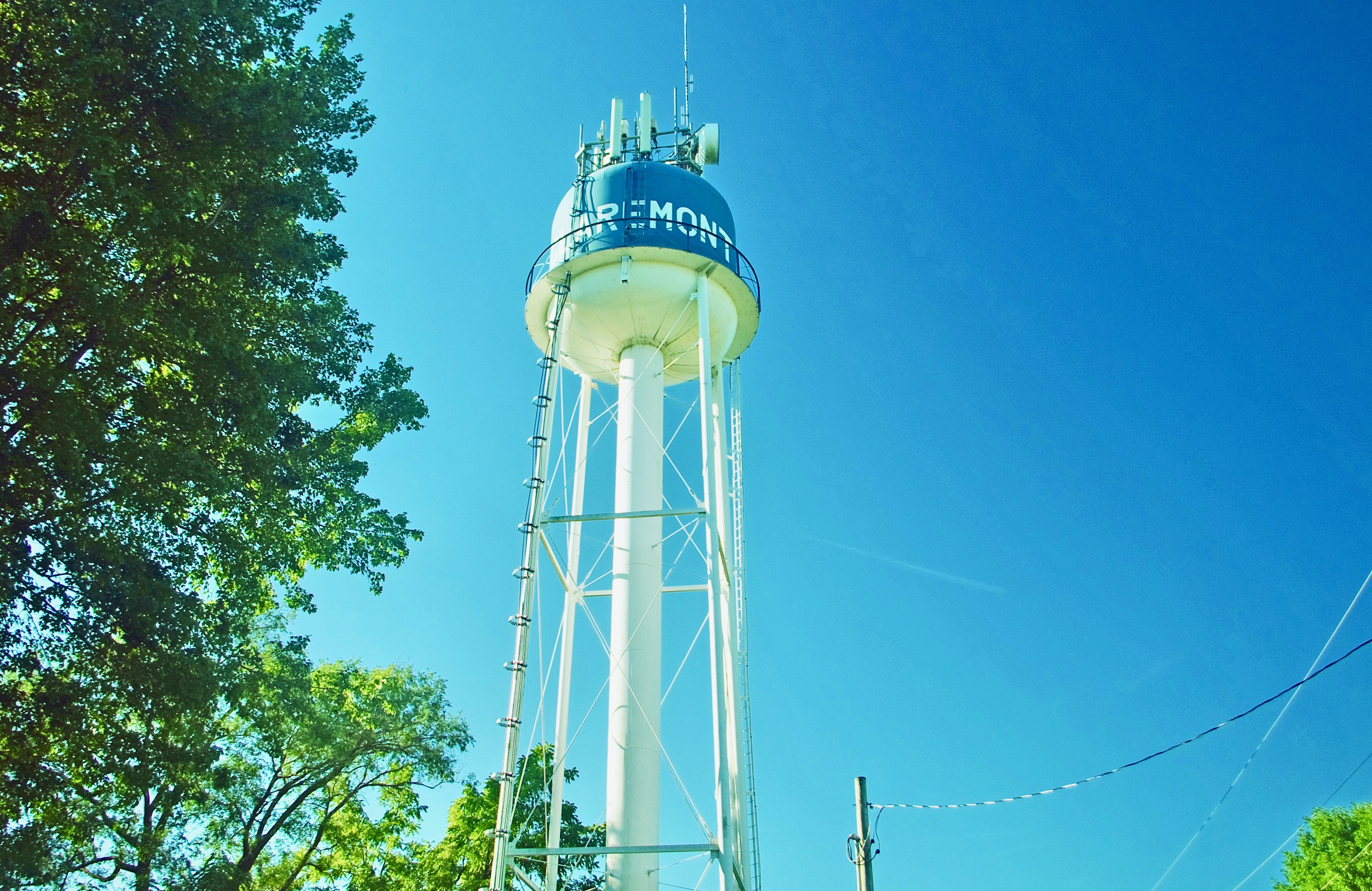
Claremont water tower, July 2020

Though Claremont (the town) was founded in 1853, people first settled in Claremont Township in 1818, the year Illinois was admitted to the union. In December 1852 Claremont precinct was formed.

The first settlers in Claremont Township included Lot Basden, who helped plat Olney, James Elliott, who owned land here, Thomas L. Stewart, an early constable and sheriff of Richland County, and Martin Utterback, who reportedly hauled logs to build the first county courthouse. Others included William Laws, Willis Blanchard, Bryant Bullard, Richard Brinkley, Jacob and William Coanour, and the Calhouns.

Claremont was laid out by Jacob May. In 1853 he moved his store to a point along the Trace Road. In 1855, when the O & M Railroad was built, he moved his store to a site along the railroad, and the present village of Claremont came into existence.

== Geography ==
Claremont is located just southeast of Olney, and just south of U.S. Route 150.

According to the 2010 census, Claremont has a total area of 1.14 square miles (2.95 km^{2}), all land.

== Demographics ==
Historical population
Census	Pop.	Note	%±
1860	121		—
1870	120		−0.8%
1880	163		35.8%
1890	212		30.1%
1900	226		6.6%
1910	186		−17.7%
1920	186		0.0%
1930	179		−3.8%
1940	205		14.5%
1950	249		21.5%
1960	223		−10.4%
1970	269		20.6%
1980	255		−5.2%
1990	256		0.4%
2000	212		−17.2%
2010	176		−17.0%
2020	161		−8.5%
U.S. Decennial Census

As of the census of 2000, there were 212 people, 91 households, and 64 families residing in the village. The population density was 186.7 inhabitants per square mile (72.1/km^{2}). There were 100 housing units at an average density of 88.1 units per square mile (34.0 units/km^{2}). The racial makeup of the village was 100.00% White.

There were 91 households, out of which 30.8% had children under the age of 18 living with them, 59.3% were married couples living together, 6.6% had a female householder with no husband present, and 28.6% were non-families. 28.6% of all households were made up of individuals, and 15.4% had someone living alone who was 65 years of age or older. The average household size was 2.33 and the average family size was 2.77.

In the village, the population was spread out, with 23.6% under the age of 18, 5.7% from 18 to 24, 30.7% from 25 to 44, 22.6% from 45 to 64, and 17.5% who were 65 years of age or older. The median age was 39 years. For every 100 females, there were 114.1 males. For every 100 females age 18 and over, there were 105.1 males.

The median income for a household in the village was $31,667, and the median income for a family was $39,375. Males had a median income of $30,000 versus $17,222 for females. The per capita income for the village was $15,606. None of the families and 2.5% of the population were living below the poverty line.

== Notable people ==
- James R. Lindsay, U.S. Army brigadier general
- Dial D. Ryder, gunsmith, was born in Claremont; Ryder supposedly worked on the rifle that Lee Harvey Oswald used in the assassination of President John F. Kennedy.

== See also ==
- List of municipalities in Illinois
