= Valdez-Yukon Railroad =

Valdez-Yukon Railroad was an early 20th century railway in the U.S. state of Alaska, built subsequent to the Klondike Gold Rush. The Valdez-Yukon Railroad Company was organized in 1905 for the purpose of building a railroad from Valdez to Eagle City, and to tap the rich copper and gold districts of the Copper, Chitina, and Tanana rivers. The line was discontinued after reaching Keystone Canyon.

== History ==
The surveyed route was conceived by railroad and transportation experts, including the military engineers for the United States government, to be the shortest and most feasible route to the interior of Alaska and the Yukon River, and President Theodore Roosevelt, in his message to the U.S. Congress in December, 1904 recommended government aid for a railroad over this route. The total length of the road was projected to be 450 miles (720 km). In October 1905, the authorized capital stock of the Valdez-Yukon Railroad Company was $10,000,000; par value of the shares $100 each. Ten miles of roadbed was graded by this time. The company expected to complete 20 miles (32 km) by spring. The company stated that it had the first right by pre-emption through the canyon which must be traversed by any railroad building from Valdez to the Yukon. After reaching Keystone Canyon, the line was discontinued.

== People ==
The engineer In charge was Alexander W. Swanitz. The officers and directors of the company included several leading bankers, manufacturers and business men. The law firm of Gifford, Hobbs, Haskell & Beard of New York City provided legal representation.
