= Parkersburg, Illinois =

Parkersburg
- Village
- Location of Parkersburg in Richland County, Illinois.
- Coordinates: 38°35′21″N 88°03′25″W
- Country: United States
- State: Illinois
- County: Richland

Area
  - Total: 0.83 sq mi (2.14 km^{2})
  - Land: 0.83 sq mi (2.14 km^{2})
  - Water: 0 sq mi (0.00 km^{2})
- Elevation: 486 ft (148 m)

Population (2020)
  - Total: 186
  - Density: 225.3/sq mi (86.99/km^{2})
- Time zone: UTC-6 (CST)
  - Summer (DST): UTC-5 (CDT)
- ZIP code: 62452
- Area code: 618
- FIPS code: 17–57693
- GNIS feature ID: 2399624

Parkersburg is a village in Richland County, Illinois, United States. As of the 2020 census, Parkersburg had a population of 186.

== Geography ==
According to the 2010 census, Parkersburg has a total area of 0.75 square miles (1.94 km^{2}), all land.

== Demographics ==
Historical population
| Census | Pop. | Note | %± |
|---|---|---|---|
| 1880 | 258 | | — |
| 1890 | 196 | | −24.0% |
| 1930 | 308 | | — |
| 1940 | 257 | | −16.6% |
| 1950 | 288 | | 12.1% |
| 1960 | 253 | | −12.2% |
| 1970 | 262 | | 3.6% |
| 1980 | 268 | | 2.3% |
| 1990 | 211 | | −21.3% |
| 2000 | 234 | | 10.9% |
| 2010 | 199 | | −15.0% |
| 2020 | 186 | | −6.5% |
U.S. Decennial Census

As of the census of 2000, there were 234 people, 98 households, and 63 families residing in the village. The population density was 313.6 inhabitants per square mile (121.1/km^{2}). There were 105 housing units at an average density of 140.7 units per square mile (54.3 units/km^{2}). The racial makeup of the village was 100.00% White.

There were 98 households, out of which 33.7% had children under the age of 18 living with them, 56.1% were married couples living together, 5.1% had a female householder with no husband present, and 35.7% were non-families. 31.6% of all households were made up of individuals, and 13.3% had someone living alone who was 65 years of age or older. The average household size was 2.39 and the average family size was 3.03.

In the village, the population was spread out, with 26.5% under the age of 18, 7.3% from 18 to 24, 33.8% from 25 to 44, 20.1% from 45 to 64, and 12.4% who were 65 years of age or older. The median age was 35 years. For every 100 females, there were 103.5 males. For every 100 females age 18 and over, there were 102.4 males.

The median income for a household in the village was $23,250, and the median income for a family was $30,000. Males had a median income of $23,125 versus $20,625 for females. The per capita income for the village was $14,581. About 8.3% of families and 18.6% of the population were below the poverty line, including 29.7% of those under the age of eighteen and 12.8% of those 65 or over.
