= 1916 United States presidential election in Illinois =

- November 7, 1916
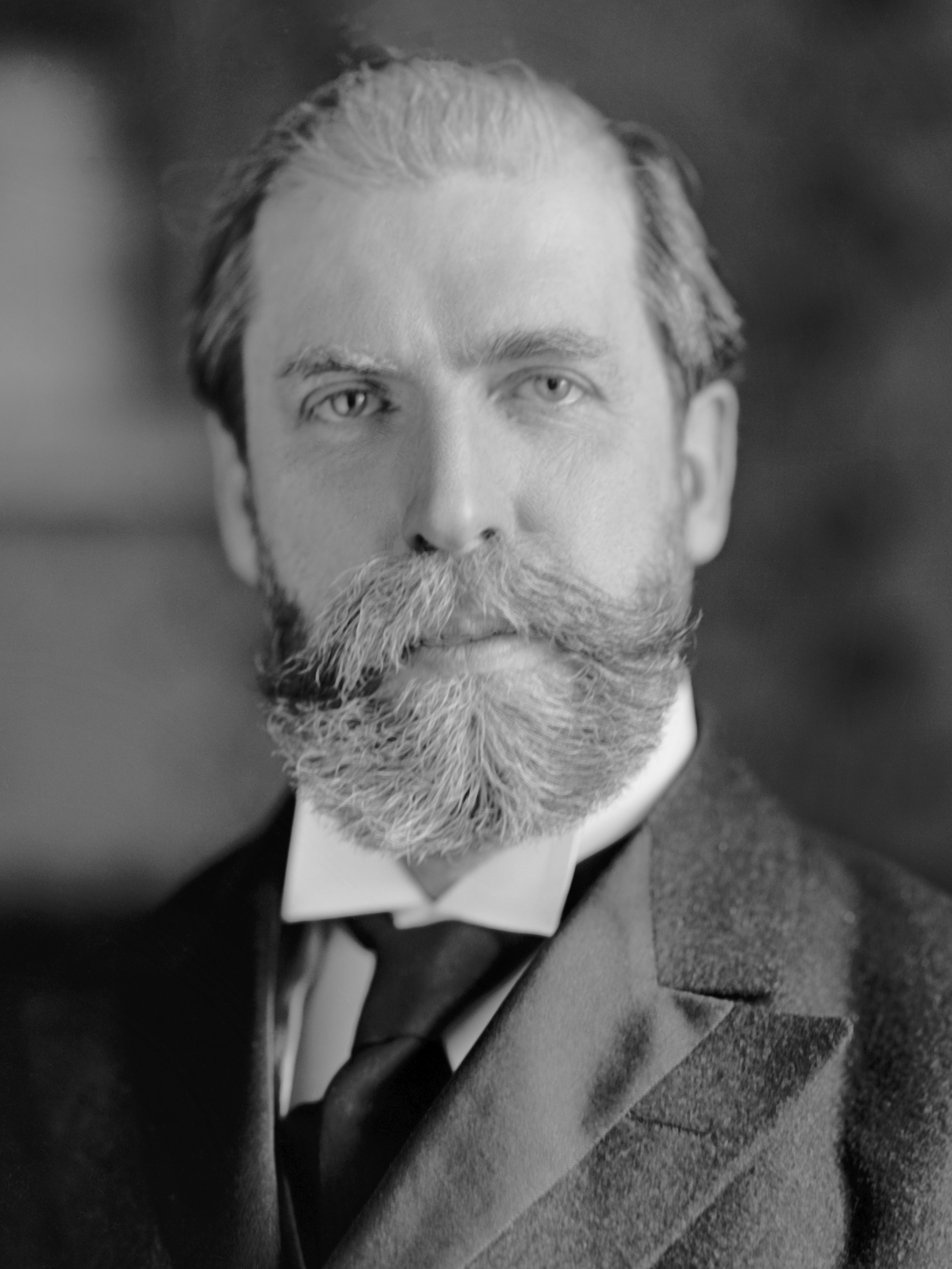

Nominee	Charles Evans Hughes	Woodrow Wilson
Party	Republican	Democratic
Home state	New York	New Jersey
Running mate	Charles W. Fairbanks	Thomas R. Marshall
Electoral vote	29	0
Popular vote	1,152,549	950,229
Percentage	52.56%	43.34%
County results
Hughes
40–50%
50–60%
60–70%
70–80%
Wilson
40–50%
50–60%
60–70%
President before election
Woodrow Wilson
Democratic
Elected President
Woodrow Wilson
Democratic

The 1916 United States presidential election in Illinois was held on November 7, 1916, as part of the 1916 United States presidential election. State voters chose 29 electors to the Electoral College, who voted for president and vice president. Illinois was won by the Republican nominee Charles Evans Hughes with 52.56% of the popular vote. Hughes was the first presidential candidate to garner over a million votes in a single state, due to Illinois having allowed women to cast votes for electors, though not yet for other offices.

With 52.56% of the vote, Illinois would prove to be Hughes' fifth strongest state in terms of popular votes percentage after Vermont, New Jersey, Pennsylvania and Iowa.

This is the second of only three elections in the history of the party that a Democrat won the presidency without winning Illinois (the others being 1884 and 1976). This was one of three elections in the 20th century where the state voted for the losing candidate, along with 1976 and 2000.

In this election, Illinois voted 12.35% to the right of the nation at-large. This was the last time that Cook County voted for a Republican that lost nationally.

== Primaries ==
The general election coincided with the general election for House as well as those for state offices.

=== Turnout ===
The total vote in the state-run primary elections (Democratic, Republican, Progressive, Socialist) was 311,486. The total vote in the general election was 2,192,707. Both major parties (Democratic and Republican), as well as the Progressive Party and Socialist Party, all held non-binding state-run preferential primaries on April 11.

=== Democratic ===
1916 Illinois Democratic presidential primary
- April 11, 1916
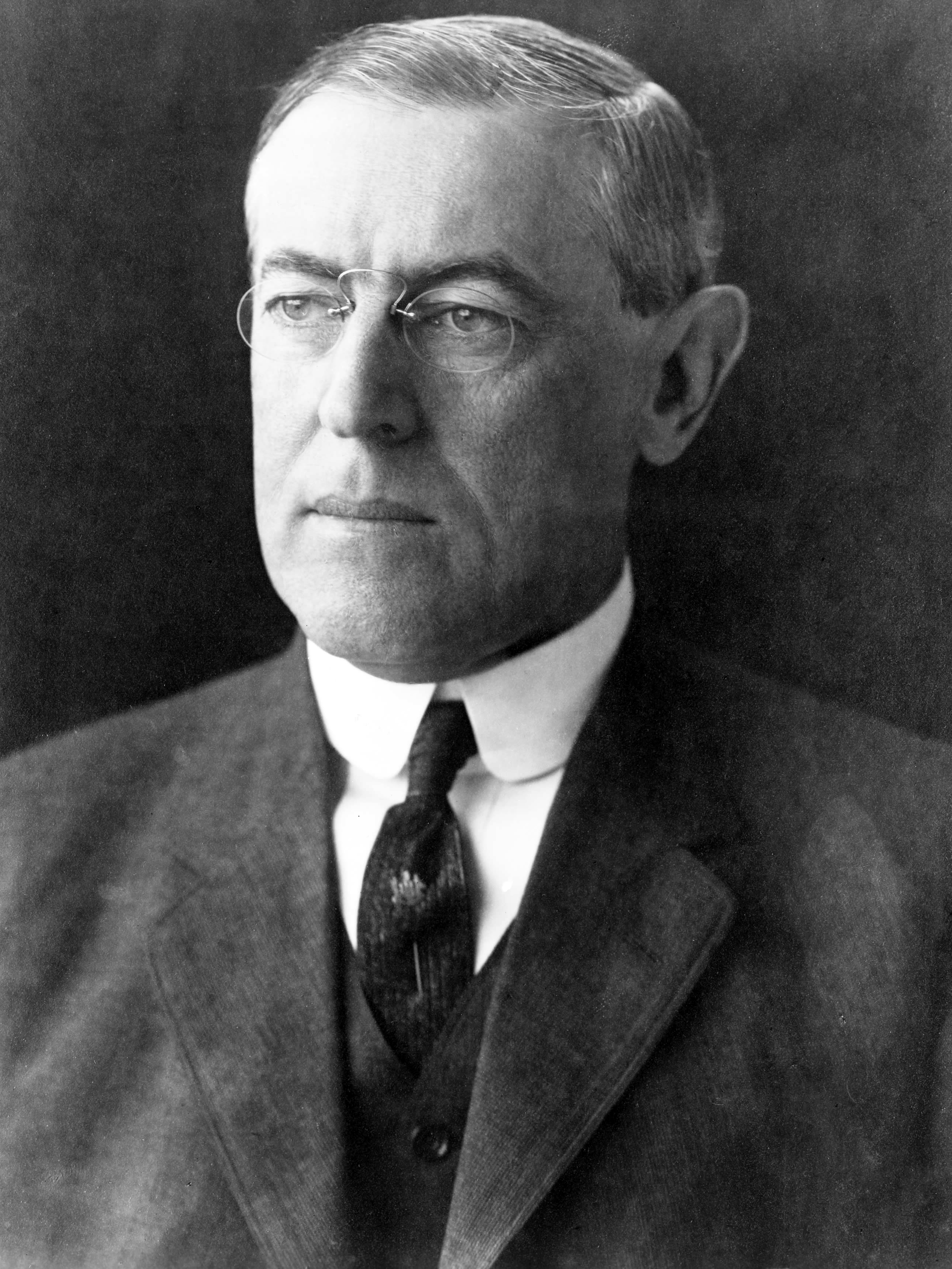
Candidate	Woodrow Wilson
Home state	New Jersey
Popular vote	136,839
Percentage	99.84%

The 1916 Illinois Democratic presidential primary was held on April 11, 1916, in the U.S. state of Illinois as one of the Democratic Party's state primaries ahead of the 1916 presidential election.

The popular vote was a non-binding "beauty contest". Delegates were instead elected by direct votes by congressional district on delegate candidates. Delegate candidates either were listed on the ballot with their preference on for a particular presidential candidate, or were listed as expressing no preference.

1916 Illinois Democratic presidential primary
Candidate	Votes	%
Woodrow Wilson (incumbent)	136,839	99.84
Scattering	219	0.16
Total votes	137,058	100

=== Republican ===
1916 Illinois Republican presidential primary
- April 11, 1916
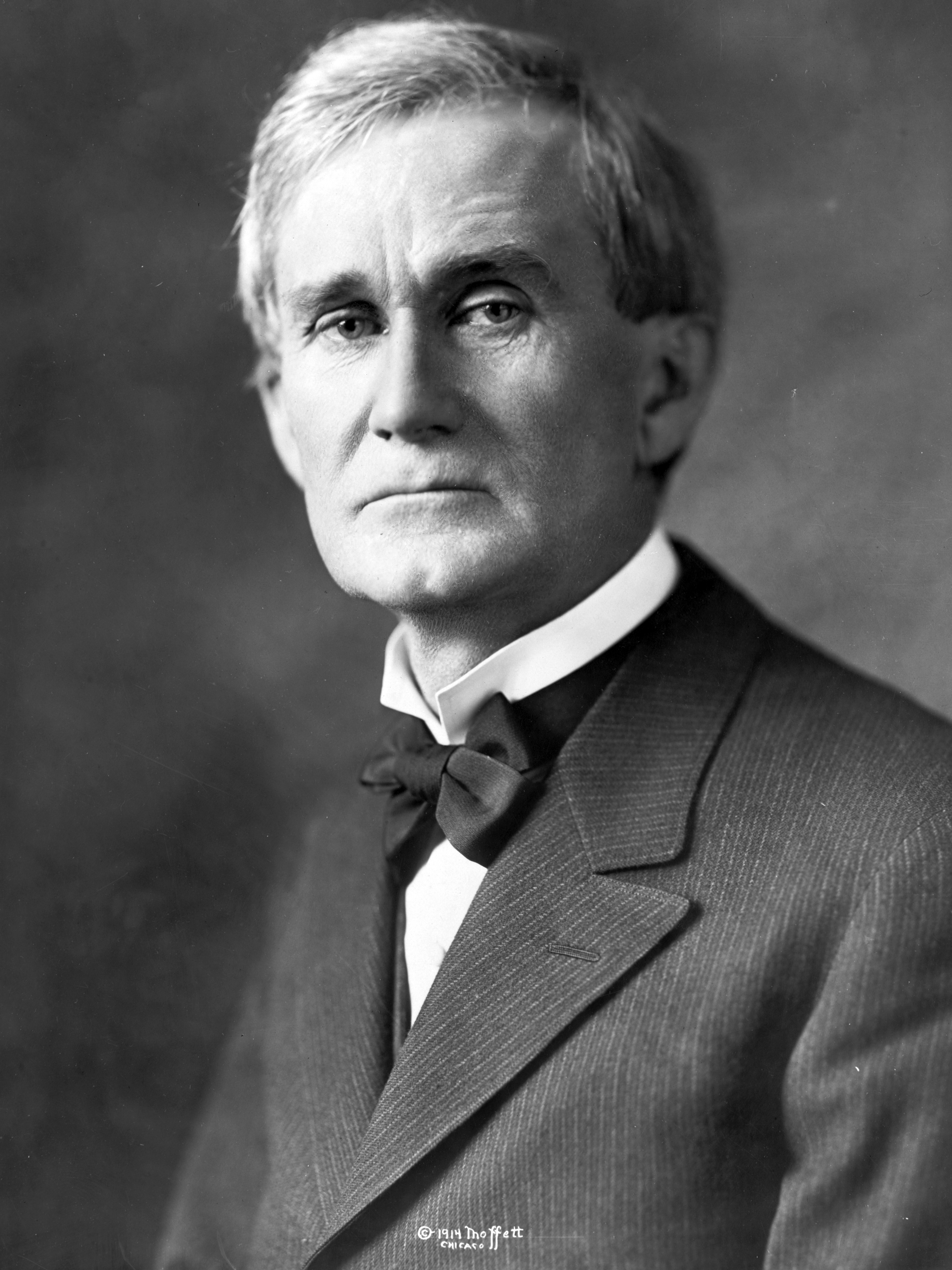
Candidate	Lawrence Y. Sherman
Home state	Illinois
Popular vote	155,945
Percentage	90.15%

The 1916 Illinois Republican presidential primary was held on April 11, 1916, in the U.S. state of Illinois as one of the Republican Party's state primaries ahead of the 1916 presidential election.

The preference vote was a "beauty contest". Delegates were instead selected by direct-vote in each congressional districts on delegate candidates. Delegate candidates either were listed on the ballot with their preference on for a particular presidential candidate, or were listed as expressing no preference.

1916 Illinois Republican presidential primary
Candidate	Votes	%
Lawrence Y. Sherman	155,945	90.15
Scattering	17,037	9.85
Total votes	172,982	100

=== Progressive ===
1916 Illinois Progressive presidential primary
- April 11, 1916

The 1916 Illinois Progressive presidential primary was held on April 11, 1916, in the U.S. state of Illinois as one of the Progressive Party's state primaries ahead of the 1916 presidential election.

1916 Illinois Progressive presidential primary
Candidate	Votes	%
Scattering	1,089	100
Total votes	1,089	100

=== Socialist ===
1916 Illinois Socialist presidential primary
- April 11, 1916

The 1916 Illinois Socialist presidential primary was held on April 11, 1916, in the U.S. state of Illinois as one of the Socialist Party's state primaries ahead of the 1916 presidential election.

1916 Illinois Socialist presidential primary
Candidate	Votes	%
Scattering	357	100
Total votes	357	100

== Results ==
1916 United States presidential election in Illinois
Party	Candidate	Votes	Percentage	Electoral votes
Republican	Charles Evans Hughes	1,152,549	52.56%	29
Democratic	Woodrow Wilson (incumbent)	950,229	43.34%	0
Socialist	Allan Benson	61,394	2.80%	0
Prohibition	James Hanly	26,047	1.19%	0
Socialist Labor	Arthur Reimer	2,488	0.11%	0

Illinois's law had allowed women to vote for statutory offices since 1913, which included presidential electors.This makes the 1916 presidential election in the state unique in having the vote tabulated separately by sex in 98 of the state's 102 counties. (Four counties' totals were combined before being sent to the state.) Women accounted for 40% of both major parties' vote, for 28% of the Socialist vote, and for 62% of the Prohibitionist.

=== Chicago results ===
1916 United States presidential election in Chicago
Party	Candidate	Votes	Percentage
Republican	Charles Evans Hughes	377,201	49.66%
Democratic	Woodrow Wilson	351,175	46.23%
Socialist	Allan Benson	28,727	3.78%
Prohibition	James Hanly	1,597	0.21%
Socialist Labor	Arthur Reimer	907	0.12%
Totals		759,607	100.00%

=== Results by county ===
County	Charles Evans Hughes Republican		Thomas Woodrow Wilson Democratic		Allan Louis Benson Socialist		James Franklin Hanly Prohibition		Arthur Elmer Reimer Socialist Labor		Margin		Total votes cast
County	#	%	#	%	#	%	#	%	#	%	#	%	Total votes cast
Adams	11,858	44.28%	14,268	53.28%	389	1.45%	263	0.98%	30	0.11%	-2,410	-9.00%	26,778
Alexander	5,395	56.80%	3,940	41.48%	116	1.22%	47	0.49%	7	0.07%	1,455	15.32%	9,498
Bond	3,626	54.04%	2,652	39.52%	38	0.57%	394	5.87%	4	0.06%	974	14.52%	6,710
Boone	5,181	77.64%	1,211	18.15%	190	2.85%	91	1.36%	5	0.07%	3,970	59.49%	6,673
Brown	1,579	34.54%	2,856	62.47%	17	0.37%	120	2.62%	0	0.00%	-1,277	-27.93%	4,572
Bureau	8,213	56.29%	5,793	39.71%	249	1.71%	335	2.30%	24	0.16%	2,420	16.59%	14,590
Calhoun	1,168	48.50%	1,181	49.04%	29	1.20%	30	1.25%	5	0.21%	-13	-0.54%	2,408
Carroll	4,496	67.03%	1,980	29.52%	94	1.40%	137	2.04%	3	0.04%	2,516	37.51%	6,707
Cass	3,193	39.59%	4,485	55.60%	152	1.88%	236	2.93%	16	0.20%	-1,292	-16.02%	8,066
Champaign	14,632	57.87%	9,601	37.97%	254	1.00%	799	3.16%	18	0.07%	5,031	19.90%	25,286
Christian	6,923	44.19%	7,982	50.95%	421	2.69%	339	2.16%	27	0.17%	-1,059	-6.76%	15,665
Clark	4,936	47.28%	5,311	50.87%	51	0.49%	142	1.36%	6	0.06%	-375	-3.59%	10,440
Clay	3,879	50.50%	3,574	46.53%	145	1.89%	83	1.08%	11	0.14%	305	3.97%	7,681
Clinton	3,423	42.65%	4,201	52.34%	302	3.76%	100	1.25%	11	0.14%	-778	-9.69%	8,026
Coles	8,314	50.85%	7,772	47.53%	88	0.54%	177	1.08%	6	0.04%	542	3.31%	16,351
Cook	435,695	51.26%	379,438	44.64%	32,471	3.82%	2,309	0.27%	1,050	0.12%	56,257	6.62%	849,913
Crawford	5,084	46.32%	5,570	50.74%	142	1.29%	181	1.65%	8	0.07%	-486	-4.43%	10,977
Cumberland	2,879	48.26%	2,960	49.62%	41	0.69%	85	1.42%	8	0.13%	-81	-1.36%	5,965
DeKalb	9,764	71.29%	3,386	24.72%	316	2.31%	231	1.69%	0	0.00%	6,378	46.56%	13,697
DeWitt	4,380	47.91%	4,460	48.78%	99	1.08%	204	2.23%	3	0.03%	-80	-0.87%	9,143
Douglas	4,564	52.21%	3,768	43.11%	150	1.72%	259	2.96%	7	0.08%	796	9.11%	8,741
DuPage	9,610	62.88%	4,816	31.51%	378	2.47%	480	3.14%	10	0.07%	4,794	31.37%	15,284
Edgar	6,099	46.39%	6,710	51.04%	136	1.03%	202	1.54%	7	0.05%	-611	-4.65%	13,147
Edwards	2,885	65.39%	1,389	31.48%	5	0.11%	133	3.01%	0	0.00%	1,496	33.91%	4,412
Effingham	3,207	40.40%	4,529	57.05%	72	0.91%	131	1.65%	7	0.09%	-1,322	-16.65%	7,939
Fayette	5,316	46.59%	5,669	49.68%	221	1.94%	205	1.80%	8	0.07%	-353	-3.09%	11,411
Ford	4,670	66.35%	2,054	29.18%	125	1.78%	189	2.69%	5	0.07%	2,616	37.17%	7,038
Franklin	6,371	46.82%	6,419	47.17%	704	5.17%	114	0.84%	116	0.85%	-48	-0.35%	13,608
Fulton	9,735	48.68%	8,686	43.44%	1,175	5.88%	401	2.01%	74	0.37%	1,049	5.25%	19,997
Gallatin	1,985	39.08%	2,920	57.49%	85	1.67%	89	1.75%	7	0.14%	-935	-18.41%	5,079
Greene	3,400	35.60%	6,150	64.40%	0	0.00%	0	0.00%	0	0.00%	-2,750	-28.80%	9,550
Grundy	4,811	66.39%	2,241	30.92%	101	1.39%	94	1.30%	2	0.03%	2,570	35.46%	7,247
Hamilton	3,239	46.30%	3,644	52.09%	75	1.07%	38	0.54%	5	0.07%	-405	-5.79%	6,996
Hancock	6,472	43.98%	7,711	52.40%	166	1.13%	367	2.49%	10	0.07%	-1,239	-8.42%	14,716
Hardin	1,419	51.68%	1,264	46.03%	34	1.24%	29	1.06%	0	0.00%	155	5.64%	2,746
Henderson	2,528	58.55%	1,611	37.31%	60	1.39%	119	2.76%	3	0.07%	917	21.24%	4,318
Henry	11,406	65.47%	5,220	29.96%	520	2.98%	276	1.58%	12	0.07%	6,186	35.51%	17,422
Iroquois	8,503	61.13%	4,977	35.78%	87	0.63%	342	2.46%	7	0.05%	3,526	25.35%	13,909
Jackson	8,356	54.11%	6,780	43.90%	185	1.20%	122	0.79%	4	0.03%	1,576	10.21%	15,443
Jasper	3,110	43.39%	3,884	54.19%	57	0.80%	117	1.63%	5	0.07%	-774	-10.80%	7,168
Jefferson	6,028	46.38%	6,685	51.44%	101	0.78%	182	1.40%	9	0.07%	-657	-5.06%	12,996
Jersey	2,644	45.37%	3,052	52.37%	20	0.34%	112	1.92%	3	0.05%	-408	-7.00%	5,828
Jo Daviess	5,775	60.02%	3,505	36.43%	143	1.49%	199	2.07%	7	0.07%	2,270	23.59%	9,622
Johnson	3,273	62.61%	1,822	34.85%	69	1.32%	64	1.22%	2	0.04%	1,451	27.75%	5,228
Kane	23,868	67.80%	9,875	28.05%	906	2.57%	555	1.58%	45	0.13%	13,993	39.75%	35,204
Kankakee	10,594	62.34%	6,096	35.87%	92	0.54%	211	1.24%	16	0.09%	4,498	26.47%	16,993
Kendall	3,316	75.38%	1,008	22.91%	19	0.43%	56	1.27%	0	0.00%	2,308	52.47%	4,399
Knox	10,918	58.84%	6,785	36.57%	435	2.34%	417	2.25%	8	0.04%	4,133	22.27%	18,555
Lake	12,905	67.04%	5,447	28.29%	715	3.71%	184	0.96%	25	0.13%	7,458	38.74%	19,251
LaSalle	20,662	56.67%	14,625	40.11%	851	2.33%	321	0.88%	31	0.09%	6,037	16.56%	36,459
Lawrence	4,481	44.47%	5,052	50.14%	190	1.89%	353	3.50%	0	0.00%	-571	-5.67%	10,076
Lee	7,985	63.99%	4,087	32.75%	144	1.15%	263	2.11%	7	0.06%	3,898	31.24%	12,479
Livingston	9,801	58.65%	6,462	38.67%	97	0.58%	350	2.09%	4	0.02%	3,339	19.98%	16,710
Logan	5,933	48.32%	5,726	46.63%	310	2.52%	310	2.52%	15	0.12%	207	1.69%	12,279
Macon	13,997	52.96%	11,181	42.31%	632	2.39%	617	2.33%	34	0.13%	2,816	10.66%	26,427
Macoupin	8,875	43.71%	10,012	49.31%	1,089	5.36%	328	1.62%	31	0.15%	-1,137	-5.60%	20,304
Madison	17,594	49.88%	16,302	46.22%	1,091	3.09%	287	0.81%	43	0.12%	1,292	3.66%	35,274
Marion	6,438	43.02%	7,892	52.74%	425	2.84%	209	1.40%	12	0.08%	-1,454	-9.72%	14,964
Marshall	3,579	55.90%	2,593	40.50%	110	1.72%	121	1.89%	7	0.11%	986	15.40%	6,403
Mason	3,029	42.45%	3,886	54.46%	53	0.74%	168	2.35%	3	0.04%	-857	-12.01%	7,136
Massac	3,926	73.84%	1,236	23.25%	38	0.71%	117	2.20%	6	0.11%	2,690	50.59%	5,317
McDonough	7,192	53.09%	5,740	42.37%	250	1.85%	364	2.69%	3	0.02%	1,452	10.72%	13,546
McHenry	9,024	72.01%	3,278	26.16%	58	0.46%	172	1.37%	1	0.01%	5,746	45.85%	12,532
McLean	14,988	53.24%	11,699	41.56%	450	1.60%	1,016	3.61%	7	0.02%	3,289	11.68%	28,153
Menard	2,693	48.54%	2,689	48.47%	60	1.08%	106	1.91%	10	0.18%	4	0.07%	5,548
Mercer	5,308	58.94%	3,430	38.09%	69	0.77%	199	2.21%	2	0.02%	1,878	20.85%	9,006
Monroe	2,825	56.91%	2,104	42.39%	27	0.54%	8	0.16%	0	0.00%	721	14.52%	4,964
Montgomery	7,065	44.74%	7,903	50.04%	607	3.84%	218	1.38%	31	0.20%	-838	-5.31%	15,793
Morgan	7,536	50.28%	7,104	47.40%	157	1.05%	191	1.27%	10	0.07%	432	2.88%	14,988
Moultrie	2,933	44.99%	3,370	51.70%	55	0.84%	161	2.47%	6	0.09%	-437	-6.70%	6,519
Ogle	8,639	70.33%	3,207	26.11%	69	0.56%	368	3.00%	5	0.04%	5,432	44.22%	12,283
Peoria	18,615	48.48%	18,718	48.75%	718	1.87%	344	0.90%	83	0.22%	-103	-0.27%	38,395
Perry	4,796	49.83%	4,445	46.18%	170	1.77%	214	2.22%	24	0.25%	351	3.65%	9,625
Piatt	4,012	55.52%	3,028	41.90%	88	1.22%	98	1.36%	4	0.06%	984	13.62%	7,226
Pike	5,293	41.40%	7,005	54.79%	239	1.87%	249	1.95%	13	0.10%	-1,712	-13.39%	12,786
Pope	2,924	70.22%	1,158	27.81%	57	1.37%	25	0.60%	5	0.12%	1,766	42.41%	4,164
Pulaski	3,863	62.73%	2,159	35.06%	87	1.41%	49	0.80%	1	0.02%	1,704	27.67%	6,158
Putnam	1,444	62.48%	785	33.97%	42	1.82%	40	1.73%	0	0.00%	659	28.52%	2,311
Randolph	5,517	49.11%	5,403	48.10%	132	1.18%	181	1.61%	13	0.12%	114	1.01%	11,233
Richland	2,992	45.10%	3,431	51.72%	79	1.19%	132	1.99%	2	0.03%	-439	-6.62%	6,634
Rock Island	16,169	53.32%	10,914	35.99%	2,855	9.42%	384	1.27%	88	0.29%	5,255	17.33%	30,322
Saline	7,061	50.60%	5,930	42.50%	787	5.64%	176	1.26%	30	0.21%	1,131	8.11%	13,954
Sangamon	20,900	51.69%	17,958	44.41%	1,001	2.48%	576	1.42%	29	0.07%	2,942	7.28%	40,435
Schuyler	2,595	41.60%	3,392	54.38%	36	0.58%	215	3.45%	4	0.06%	-797	-12.78%	6,238
Scott	2,126	45.72%	2,457	52.84%	21	0.45%	46	0.99%	0	0.00%	-331	-7.12%	4,650
Shelby	5,911	42.63%	7,515	54.20%	83	0.60%	357	2.57%	5	0.04%	-1,604	-11.57%	13,866
St. Clair	22,134	47.77%	22,622	48.83%	1,152	2.49%	423	0.91%	75	0.16%	-488	-1.05%	46,331
Stark	2,887	66.58%	1,390	32.06%	31	0.71%	28	0.65%	1	0.02%	1,497	34.52%	4,336
Stephenson	8,620	58.46%	5,463	37.05%	433	2.94%	228	1.55%	20	0.14%	3,157	21.41%	14,744
Tazewell	6,672	47.61%	6,743	48.12%	341	2.43%	258	1.84%	14	0.10%	-71	-0.51%	14,014
Union	3,135	37.14%	5,171	61.27%	60	0.71%	74	0.88%	7	0.08%	-2,036	-24.12%	8,440
Vermilion	16,330	50.29%	13,864	42.70%	605	1.86%	1,673	5.15%	24	0.07%	2,466	7.59%	32,472
Wabash	2,600	42.42%	3,264	53.26%	86	1.40%	179	2.92%	2	0.03%	-664	-10.83%	6,129
Warren	6,294	56.47%	4,498	40.36%	154	1.38%	199	1.79%	7	0.06%	1,796	16.11%	11,145
Washington	4,657	60.95%	2,794	36.57%	105	1.37%	85	1.11%	0	0.00%	1,863	24.38%	7,641
Wayne	5,383	51.03%	4,934	46.77%	59	0.56%	173	1.64%	7	0.07%	449	4.26%	10,549
White	4,137	43.84%	5,066	53.68%	151	1.60%	83	0.88%	16	0.17%	-929	-9.84%	9,437
Whiteside	10,045	69.31%	3,839	26.49%	127	0.88%	482	3.33%	14	0.10%	6,206	42.82%	14,493
Will	19,881	62.62%	11,378	35.84%	317	1.00%	171	0.54%	18	0.06%	8,503	26.78%	31,747
Williamson	10,262	53.62%	8,172	42.70%	580	3.03%	124	0.65%	42	0.22%	2,090	10.92%	19,138
Winnebago	14,893	65.09%	6,198	27.09%	1,439	6.29%	352	1.54%	15	0.07%	8,695	38.00%	22,882
Woodford	4,273	52.29%	3,619	44.29%	87	1.06%	192	2.35%	11	0.13%	654	8.00%	8,171
Totals	1,152,549	52.62%	950,229	43.39%	61,394	2.80%	26,047	1.19%	2,488	0.11%	202,320	9.24%	2,190,219

== See also ==
- United States presidential elections in Illinois
