= Berryville, Illinois =

Berryville
- Unincorporated community
- Location of Berryville within Illinois Berryville (the United States)
- Coordinates: 38°35′58″N 87°55′43″W
- Country: United States
- State: Illinois
- County: Richland
- Elevation: 502 ft (153 m)
- Time zone: UTC-6 (CST)
  - Summer (DST): UTC-5 (CDT)
- ZIP code: 62419
- Area code: 618
- GNIS feature ID: 404229

Berryville is an unincorporated community in Richland County, Illinois, United States.

== History ==
The Berryville community formed near the Bonpas Creek, which moved grains, timber, and other natural resources from the river downstream, but eventually the countryside was cleared of trees, and erosion filled the creek's channel with silt, making barge traffic to the area obsolete.

Currently, the community maintains the Berryville Christian Church and the Berryville Community Center. In 2003 Berryville Vineyards began selling locally grown wines. Berryville's community center hosts two major events each year. The Osmon Fox Hunters Association Field Trial and Bench Show exhibits coonhound dogs annually over the Fourth of July holiday. The Berryville Chowder occurs annually on the Saturday before Labor Day, serving Southern-Illinois style chowder.
