= Alexander W. Swanitz =

American civil engineer

Alexander W. Swanitz (April 1851 - December 22, 1915) was an American civil engineer who participated in the construction of a number of railroads in various parts of the country.

== Personal life ==
Born in Richland County, Illinois in 1851, he was the son of Dr. G. and Ida (von Stephan) Swanltz. He received his education at Carl August College, in Eisenach, Germany, and Ecole Technique, in Paris, France. He married Mary Henning in 1875; they had one son, Henry.

== Career ==
Swanitz served as Assistant. U. S. Engineer (1870–2); Lieutenant-Colonel of Engineers in the Egyptian Army (1873); and Superintendent of public schools, in Hickman, Kentucky (1874–5). He was a city engineer in Shreveport, Louisiana (1876) construction engineer for the International–Great Northern Railroad in Texas (1877–81); construction engineer for Chicago and North Western Transportation Company in Iowa and South Dakota (1881–7); chief engineer and manager of the Chicago & Calumet Terminal (1888–9); chief engineer of Charleston East Shore Railroad Terminals (1889–91); consulting engineer on Wall Street in New York City (1891–5); chief engineer and manager of the New Orleans Terminals (1895–8) and Sticknoy Clearing Yard in Chicago (1899–1901). He became the chief engineer of the Alaska Central Railway in Seward, Alaska in 1901. In 1905, he was appointed engineer in charge of the Valdez-Yukon Railroad. He died at Alameda, California in 1915.
