= Noble Township, Richland County, Illinois =

Noble Township
- Township

- Location of Illinois in the United States
- Coordinates: 38°43′N 88°13′W
- Country: United States
- State: Illinois
- County: Richland
- Settled: November 4, 1879

Area
  - Total: 41.27 sq mi (106.9 km^{2})
  - Land: 41.23 sq mi (106.8 km^{2})
  - Water: 0.04 sq mi (0.10 km^{2})
- Elevation: 489 ft (149 m)

Population (2010)
  - Estimate (2016): 1,400
  - Density: 34.7/sq mi (13.4/km^{2})
- Time zone: UTC-6 (CST)
  - Summer (DST): UTC-5 (CDT)
- FIPS code: 17-159-53156

Noble Township is located in Richland County, Illinois. As of the 2010 census, its population was 1,430 and it contained 645 housing units.

== Geography ==
According to the 2010 census, the township has a total area of 41.27 square miles (106.9 km^{2}), of which 41.23 square miles (106.8 km^{2}) (or 99.90%) is land and 0.04 square miles (0.10 km^{2}) (or 0.10%) is water.

== Demographics ==
Historical population
Census	Pop.	Note	%±
2016 (est.)	1,400
U.S. Decennial Census
