= Preston Township, Richland County, Illinois =

Preston Township
- Township

- Location of Illinois in the United States
- Coordinates: 38°48′12″N 88°05′23″W
- Country: United States
- State: Illinois
- County: Richland
- Settled: November 4, 1879

Area
  - Total: 41.53 sq mi (107.6 km^{2})
  - Land: 40.73 sq mi (105.5 km^{2})
  - Water: 0.8 sq mi (2.1 km^{2})
- Elevation: 449 ft (137 m)

Population (2010)
  - Estimate (2016): 1,220
  - Density: 30.6/sq mi (11.8/km^{2})
- Time zone: UTC-6 (CST)
  - Summer (DST): UTC-5 (CDT)
- FIPS code: 17-159-61847

Preston Township is located in Richland County, Illinois. As of the 2010 census, its population was 1,247 and it contained 635 housing units. Before May 2, 1859, this locale was known as Douglas Township.

== Geography ==
According to the 2010 census, the township has a total area of 41.53 square miles (107.6 km^{2}), of which 40.73 square miles (105.5 km^{2}) (or 98.07%) is land and 0.8 square miles (2.1 km^{2}) (or 1.93%) is water.

== Demographics ==
Historical population
Census	Pop.	Note	%±
2016 (est.)	1,220
U.S. Decennial Census
