= Walloons in Wisconsin =

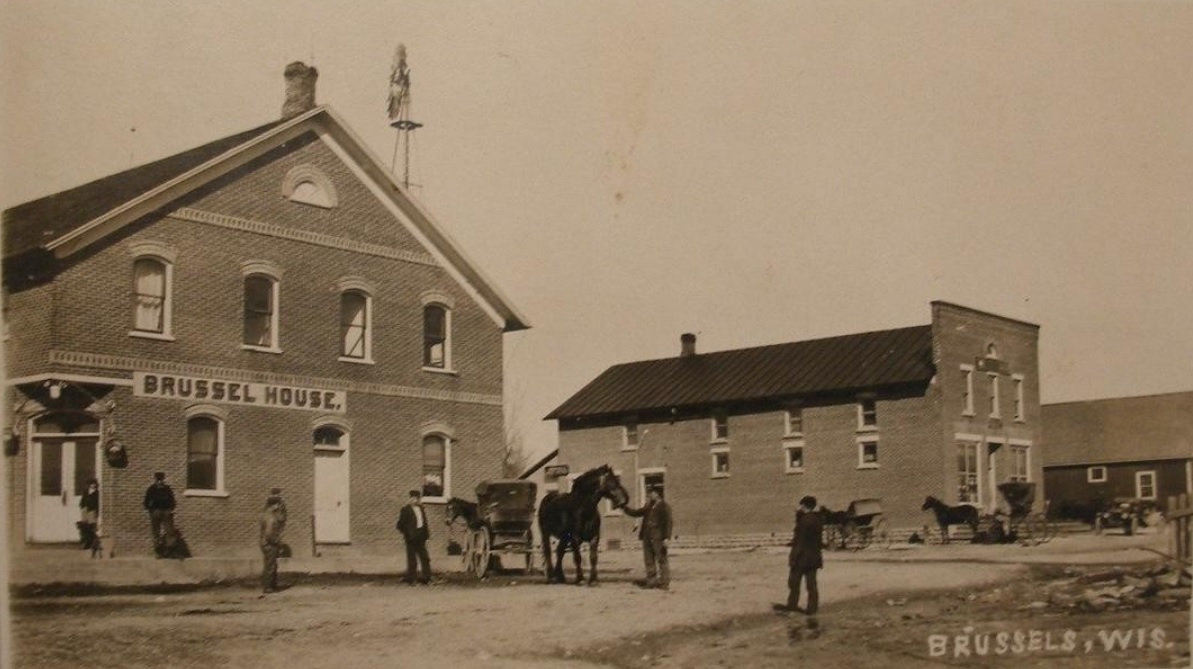
A view of Brussels, Wisconsin in 1914

Walloons are an ethnic group originating from the Wallonia region of Belgium and a distinct subgroup of Belgian Americans. Mainly arriving between the years 1853 and 1858, and settling in parts of Brown, Door, and Kewaunee counties, Wisconsin is unique for being home to one of the few Walloon ethnic enclaves worldwide, and being home to a special dialect of Walloon called Wisconsin Walloon.

== History ==
The majority of the first Walloons in Wisconsin were immigrants from the Namur region of Belgium. In the years leading up to the departure of the first immigrants, Belgium had just gained independence from the Dutch, and became a sovereign nation. Despite having greater freedom and a higher quality of life, poverty was common, and the small plots of land were often not enough to sustain a family. In addition, a potato famine and low rye production caused widespread food insecurity.

These mounting pressures prompted a small group of eighty-one Walloons to leave for the United States in 1853. On their voyage, they were accompanied by a group of Dutch immigrants headed for Sheboygan, Wisconsin, who invited the Walloons to settle nearby. The Walloons agreed, and, upon arrival, two families stayed behind in Philadelphia to make up for the money lost during the voyage. The rest of the families kept moving towards Wisconsin. Once they reached Sheboygan, however, they were disappointed to find that the fertile farmland near the city had already been claimed, and communication from the Dutch proved harder than expected.

Unsure of their situation, they met a French Canadian trapper who told them that there were more fertile lands farther north, near the Green Bay area, and on the Door Peninsula, as well as already existing French speaking villages. Seeing that as the best choice, the group migrated northward and made their first settlements in the area.

=== Immigration ===
Belgian immigrants moved to Wisconsin during the American Civil War. Northeast Wisconsin saw a huge influx of immigrants from Belgium in the mid-1800s. It began in 1852 when two Belgian families decided to make the move to America. They were unhappy with the Belgian monarchy, and sought what is now known as the "American dream." Belgians then flooded Brown, Door, and Kewaunee counties. They settled in communities named after cities in the Old Country, such as Brussels, Namur, and Rosiere. To this day those three counties still hold a significant number of people with Belgian roots.

It was not long before the new immigrants were forced into the major issue facing the United States: the American Civil War. War rosters were first filled by volunteers. When newspapers made more reports of casualties, the number of volunteers fell, forcing states like Wisconsin to start a draft. Belgians thought they were safe because they did not consider themselves citizens, but the government stretched definitions to fit most men. In order for immigrants to get land, they had to sign a "Declaration of Intent" which said they intended to become United States citizens at some point. This made them eligible for the draft.

Each town's assessor was assigned to gather a list of men, age 18–45, healthy enough to fight. Belgian families felt they were unfairly targeted by those in charge of drafts. In Door County, 40 of the 63 men drafted were Belgian. There were options for men to skip the draft, but not many, especially Belgian men, were successful. Doctors were flooded by potential soldiers claiming disabilities, which would allow them to stay home. Among the ailments claimed, there were hernias, lameness, poor sight or hearing, varicose veins and ulcers. In September 1862, Dr. H. Pearce verified disability 246 of the 454 men that sought a way out. Of those, 21 were Belgian. Shortly after, the first Civil War draft in Wisconsin was in November 1862. Finances surely came into play when it came to paying out of the draft as of 1863. Those who were desperate and able would pay $300 to get out of the war. A total of 862 men paid this, with a mere 18 of them being Belgian. The last option was for the draftee to find a substitute. This came into effect in 1864. It was difficult to find someone willing to go to war, but a substitute could have been a full-blooded Native American, a minor, or a non-citizen.

After it seemed to many Belgian people that the draft was fixed, emotions began to run high. One of the biggest issues was the language barrier. Few Belgian immigrants spoke English, therefore could not understand why they were being drafted into a war they had no intent of being a part of. Anger soon overcame these men. They would form marches with clubs, pitchforks and guns. They wanted to see fair enrollment processes. In one of the most explosive demonstrations, colonists formed and marched into the city of Green Bay, Wisconsin. They stood outside United States Senator Timothy Howe's home and demanded action. Howe addressed the crowd from his home. But because of the language barrier, the immigrants could not understand, Howe felt threatened and fled the city. Not feeling satisfied, the mob continued to march around the town until they found a fellow Belgian, O.J. Brice. Brice was able to calm the crowd in their native French. He explained that the drafting process would be filled with justice and fairness. The group was satisfied with his explanation in their own language. They then disbanded and returned home without damage or arrests.

== Impact ==
The cultural impact of Walloons can be seen throughout the region and is especially apparent in town names like Brussels, Luxembourg, and Namur. They have also contributed foods like booyah, an especially popular dish in northeastern Wisconsin. Today, the Belgian Heritage Center is the only museum about the historical and cultural significance of Walloons in the region.
