= Richland County, Illinois =

County in Illinois, United States

- County
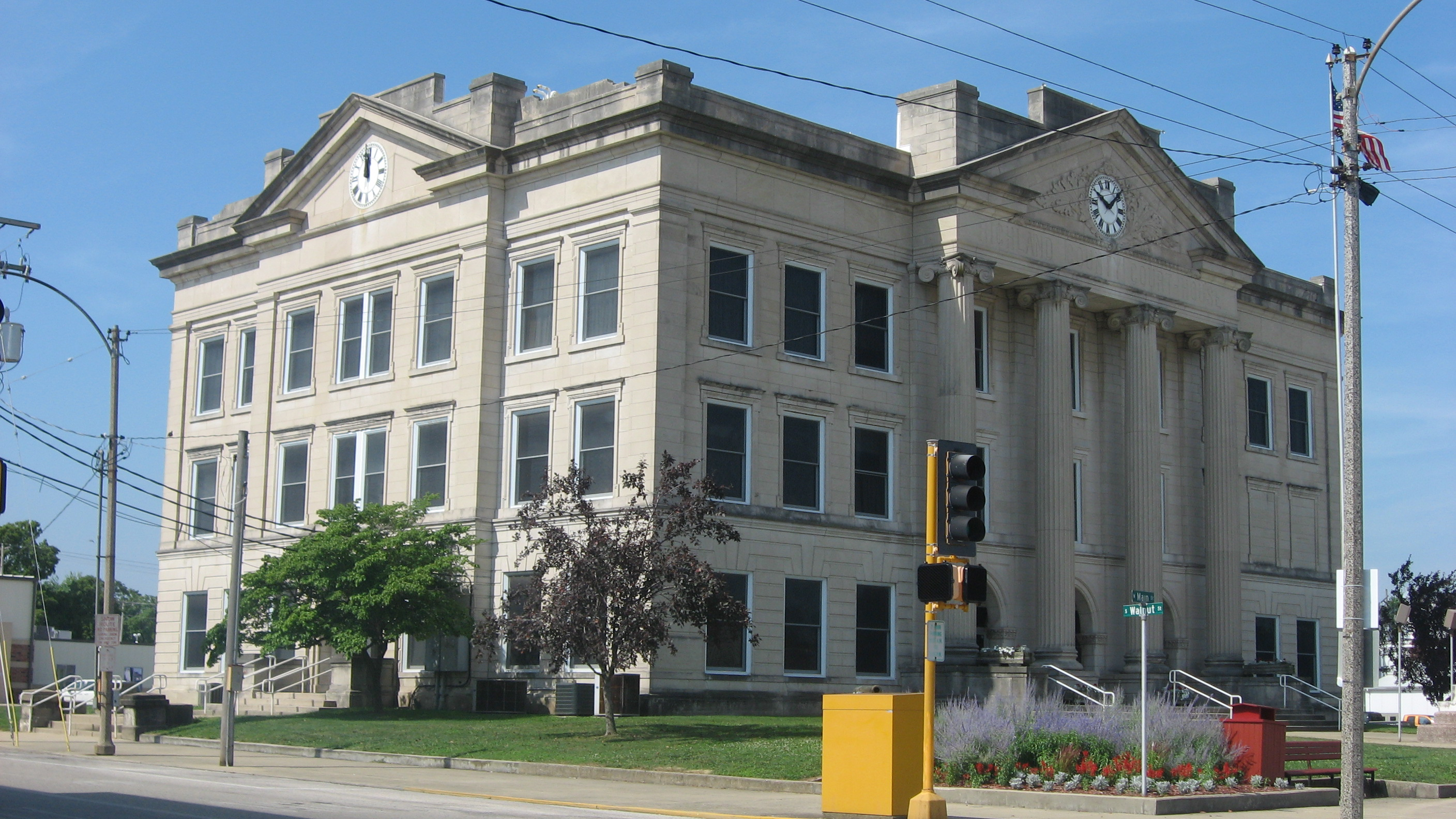
- Richland County Courthouse in Olney

- Location within the U.S. state of Illinois
- Coordinates: 38°43′N 88°05′W
- Country: United States
- State: Illinois
- Founded: February 24, 1841
- Named for: Richland County, Ohio
- Seat: Olney
- Largest city: Olney

Area
  - Total: 362 sq mi (940 km^{2})
  - Land: 356 sq mi (920 km^{2})
  - Water: 1.9 sq mi (4.9 km^{2}) 0.5%

Population (2020)
  - Total: 15,813
  - Estimate (2025): 15,219 ▼
  - Density: 44.4/sq mi (17.2/km^{2})
- Time zone: UTC−6 (Central)
  - Summer (DST): UTC−5 (CDT)
- Congressional district: 12th
- Website: richlandcounty.illinois.gov

Richland County is a county located in the U.S. state of Illinois. According to the 2020 United States census, it had a population of 15,813. Its county seat is Olney.

== History ==
Richland County was established in 1841 out of portions of East part of Clay and West part of Lawrence counties. It was named for Richland County, Ohio, where many of the early settlers migrated from.

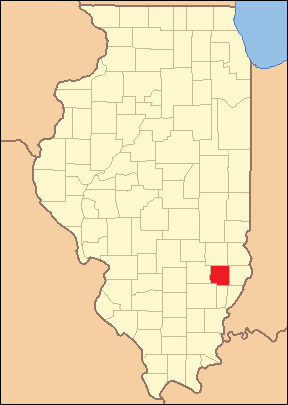
Richland County at the time of its creation in 1841

== Geography ==
According to the U.S. Census Bureau, the county has a total area of 362 square miles (940 km^{2}), of which 360 square miles (930 km^{2}) is land and 1.9 square miles (4.9 km^{2}) (0.5%) is water.

=== Climate and weather ===
Olney, Illinois

Climate chart (precipitation, max. and min. temperature)
J	F	M	A	M	J	J	A	S	O	N	D
2.8 36 19	2.7 42 23	4.4 54 32	4.4 65 42	4.8 75 52	4.1 84 62	4.1 88 66	3.6 86 63	3.1 80 55	3.3 69 44	4.4 54 34	3.7 41 24
- █ Average max. and min. temperatures in °F
- █ Precipitation totals in inches
- Source: The Weather Channel
Metric conversion
J	F	M	A	M	J	J	A	S	O	N	D
72 2 −7	69 6 −5	110 12 0	111 18 6	121 24 11	103 29 17	105 31 19	90 30 17	78 27 13	85 21 7	112 12 1	93 5 −4
- █ Average max. and min. temperatures in °C
- █ Precipitation totals in mm

In recent years, average temperatures in the county seat of Olney have ranged from a low of 19 °F (−7 °C) in January to a high of 88 °F (31 °C) in July, although a record low of −25 °F (−32 °C) was recorded in February 1951 and a record high of 112 °F (44 °C) was recorded in July 1936. Average monthly precipitation ranged from 2.73 inches (69 mm) in February to 4.76 inches (121 mm) in May.

=== Transit ===
- Rides Mass Transit District

=== Major highways ===
- U.S. Route 50
- Illinois Route 130
- Illinois Route 250

=== Adjacent counties ===
- Jasper County (north)
- Crawford County (northeast)
- Lawrence County (east)
- Wabash County (southeast)
- Edwards County (south)
- Wayne County (southwest)
- Clay County (west)

== Demographics ==
Historical population
Census	Pop.	Note	%±
1850	4,012		—
1860	9,711		142.0%
1870	12,803		31.8%
1880	15,545		21.4%
1890	15,019		−3.4%
1900	16,391		9.1%
1910	15,970		−2.6%
1920	14,044		−12.1%
1930	14,053		0.1%
1940	17,137		21.9%
1950	16,889		−1.4%
1960	16,299		−3.5%
1970	16,829		3.3%
1980	17,587		4.5%
1990	16,545		−5.9%
2000	16,149		−2.4%
2010	16,233		0.5%
2020	15,813		−2.6%
2025 (est.)	15,219	▼	−3.8%
U.S. Decennial Census; 1790–1960 1900–1990; 1990–2000 2010–2013 2020

=== 2020 census ===
As of the 2020 census, the county had a population of 15,813. The median age was 43.2 years, with 22.6% of residents under the age of 18 and 21.7% aged 65 or older. For every 100 females there were 96.3 males, and for every 100 females age 18 and over there were 93.6 males age 18 and over. The population density was 43.1 inhabitants per square mile (16.6/km^{2}).

54.7% of residents lived in urban areas, while 45.3% lived in rural areas.

The racial makeup of the county was 94.2% White, 0.5% Black or African American, 0.2% American Indian and Alaska Native, 0.8% Asian, <0.1% Native Hawaiian and Pacific Islander, 0.5% from some other race, and 3.7% from two or more races. Hispanic or Latino residents of any race comprised 1.7% of the population.

There were 6,621 households in the county, of which 27.7% had children under the age of 18 living in them. Of all households, 47.8% were married-couple households, 19.1% were households with a male householder and no spouse or partner present, and 26.1% were households with a female householder and no spouse or partner present. About 31.6% of all households were made up of individuals and 15.6% had someone living alone who was 65 years of age or older.

There were 7,364 housing units, of which 10.1% were vacant. Among occupied housing units, 73.2% were owner-occupied and 26.8% were renter-occupied. The homeowner vacancy rate was 1.5% and the rental vacancy rate was 10.9%.

=== Racial and ethnic composition ===
Richland County, Illinois – Racial and ethnic composition Note: the US Census treats Hispanic/Latino as an ethnic category. This table excludes Latinos from the racial categories and assigns them to a separate category. Hispanics/Latinos may be of any race.
Race / Ethnicity (NH = Non-Hispanic)	Pop 1980	Pop 1990	Pop 2000	Pop 2010	Pop 2020	% 1980	% 1990	% 2000	% 2010	% 2020
White alone (NH)	17,369	16,392	15,772	15,673	14,813	98.76%	99.08%	97.67%	96.55%	93.68%
Black or African American alone (NH)	12	17	42	78	75	0.07%	0.10%	0.26%	0.48%	0.47%
Native American or Alaska Native alone (NH)	23	23	18	25	28	0.13%	0.14%	0.11%	0.15%	0.18%
Asian alone (NH)	47	38	91	117	123	0.27%	0.23%	0.56%	0.72%	0.78%
Native Hawaiian or Pacific Islander alone (NH)	x	x	4	1	7	x	x	0.02%	0.01%	0.04%
Other race alone (NH)	55	1	7	4	22	0.31%	0.01%	0.04%	0.02%	0.14%
Mixed race or Multiracial (NH)	x	x	91	130	472	x	x	0.56%	0.80%	2.98%
Hispanic or Latino (any race)	81	74	124	205	273	0.46%	0.45%	0.77%	1.26%	1.73%
Total	17,587	16,545	16,149	16,233	15,813	100.00%	100.00%	100.00%	100.00%	100.00%

=== 2010 census ===
As of the 2010 United States census, there were 16,233 people, 6,726 households, and 4,438 families residing in the county.

The 2010 population density was 45.1 inhabitants per square mile (17.4/km^{2}). In 2010, there were 7,513 housing units at an average density of 20.9 per square mile (8.1/km^{2}).

The 2010 racial makeup of the county was 97.3% white, 0.7% Asian, 0.5% black or African American, 0.2% American Indian, 0.4% from other races, and 0.9% from two or more races. Those of Hispanic or Latino origin made up 1.3% of the population.

In terms of ancestry, 29.6% were German, 11.7% were American, 11.4% were English, and 9.2% were Irish.

Of the 6,726 households, 28.9% had children under the age of 18 living with them, 51.7% were married couples living together, 9.6% had a female householder with no husband present, 34.0% were non-families, and 29.3% of all households were made up of individuals. The average household size was 2.36 and the average family size was 2.88. The median age was 42.1 years.

The median income for a household in the county was $41,917 and the median income for a family was $53,853. Males had a median income of $41,058 versus $31,296 for females. The per capita income for the county was $22,874. About 9.5% of families and 13.8% of the population were below the poverty line, including 15.1% of those under age 18 and 11.9% of those age 65 or over. Richland is the top ranked most affordable county in Illinois to buy a car and is on average $932 less expensive than other Illinois counties.

== Communities ==
=== City ===
- Olney (seat)

=== Villages ===
- Calhoun
- Claremont
- Noble
- Parkersburg

=== Census-designated place ===
- Dundas

=== Unincorporated communities ===
- Berryville
- Elbow
- Wynoose
- Stringtown

=== Townships ===
Richland County is divided into nine townships:

- Bonpas
- Claremont
- Decker
- Denver
- German
- Madison
- Noble
- Olney
- Preston

== Notable people ==
- Alexander W. Swanitz (1851–1915), civil engineer who participated in the construction of railroads in various parts of the country
- Dial D. Ryder (1938–2011), gun smith

== Politics ==
Richland County is a Republican stronghold and Republicans hold all but one seat of county offices. Since the 1950s, the county has only voted for two Democratic presidents and two Democratic state governors. In all cases, these were landslide victories where the aforementioned Democrat won a majority of Illinois's counties. Illinois local Barack Obama was the last Democratic presidential candidate to obtain 40% of the vote. In recent years, Donald Trump has won Richland County by 75% margins.

Initially in the 1800s, Richland County was comfortably Democratic; though it also was fervently Whig during that party's short lifetime. The Democratic bend stayed slightly after the turn of the century: it voted for William Jennings Bryan in each of his unsuccessful presidential bids, in 1900 it voted for Samuel Alschuler for governor even as Illinois as a whole picked Richard Yates Jr., and in 1908 it voted for Adlai Stevenson I against the backdrop of Charles Samuel Deneen's successful re-election to governor. As late as 1916, Richland County voted for Democratic president Woodrow Wilson despite Illinois picking Republican Charles Evans Hughes. For the next few decades, the county would vote with the rest of Illinois, before swinging strongly to Republicans around the 1940s.

United States presidential election results for Richland County, Illinois
Year	Republican		Democratic		Third party(ies)	
Year	No.	%	No.	%	No.	%
1892	1,500	43.35%	1,542	44.57%	418	12.08%
1896	1,693	44.55%	2,062	54.26%	45	1.18%
1900	1,793	45.58%	2,042	51.91%	99	2.52%
1904	1,778	48.20%	1,604	43.48%	307	8.32%
1908	1,684	44.13%	1,938	50.79%	194	5.08%
1912	811	21.80%	1,800	48.39%	1,109	29.81%
1916	2,992	45.09%	3,431	51.70%	213	3.21%
1920	3,026	57.05%	2,174	40.99%	104	1.96%
1924	3,082	50.07%	2,749	44.66%	324	5.26%
1928	4,042	61.03%	2,550	38.50%	31	0.47%
1932	2,765	38.50%	4,318	60.12%	99	1.38%
1936	4,040	47.57%	4,268	50.26%	184	2.17%
1940	5,022	53.17%	4,335	45.89%	89	0.94%
1944	4,577	60.91%	2,858	38.04%	79	1.05%
1948	3,884	60.56%	2,438	38.02%	91	1.42%
1952	5,569	68.42%	2,565	31.51%	5	0.06%
1956	5,304	68.05%	2,485	31.88%	5	0.06%
1960	5,329	63.80%	3,015	36.09%	9	0.11%
1964	3,901	47.92%	4,239	52.08%	0	0.00%
1968	4,781	58.76%	2,495	30.66%	861	10.58%
1972	5,558	68.41%	2,553	31.42%	14	0.17%
1976	4,434	55.03%	3,485	43.25%	138	1.71%
1980	5,241	64.50%	2,463	30.31%	422	5.19%
1984	5,665	71.95%	2,182	27.71%	27	0.34%
1988	4,264	59.61%	2,863	40.03%	26	0.36%
1992	3,053	37.87%	3,286	40.76%	1,722	21.36%
1996	3,137	46.03%	2,679	39.31%	999	14.66%
2000	4,718	63.52%	2,491	33.54%	219	2.95%
2004	5,153	66.50%	2,529	32.64%	67	0.86%
2008	4,329	56.42%	3,181	41.46%	163	2.12%
2012	4,756	65.31%	2,362	32.44%	164	2.25%
2016	5,739	74.59%	1,584	20.59%	371	4.82%
2020	6,089	75.39%	1,830	22.66%	158	1.96%
2024	5,889	75.77%	1,747	22.48%	136	1.75%

== Government ==
Elected officials
Office	Office holder
County Board Chairman	Travis Paddock (R)
County Board Vice Chairman	Morgan Henton (R)
County Board Member - District 1	Brian VanBlaricum (R)
County Board Member - District 2	Dennis Graves (R)
County Board Member - District 3	Alexis McFarland (R)
County Board Member - District 4	Cynthia Ann Given (D)
County Board Member - District 5	Morgan Henton (R)
County Board Member - District 6	Travis Paddock (R)
County Board Member - District 7	Steve Schonert (R)
County Clerk	Amanda Troyer (R)
County Circuit Clerk	Zach Holder (R)
County Treasurer	Mike Hahn (R)
County Assessor	Tim Hahn (R)
Coroner	Steve Patterson (R)
States Attorney	Mary Beth Welch Collins (R)
County Sheriff	Andy Hires (R)

== See also ==
- National Register of Historic Places listings in Richland County
