= Burgoo =

American stew

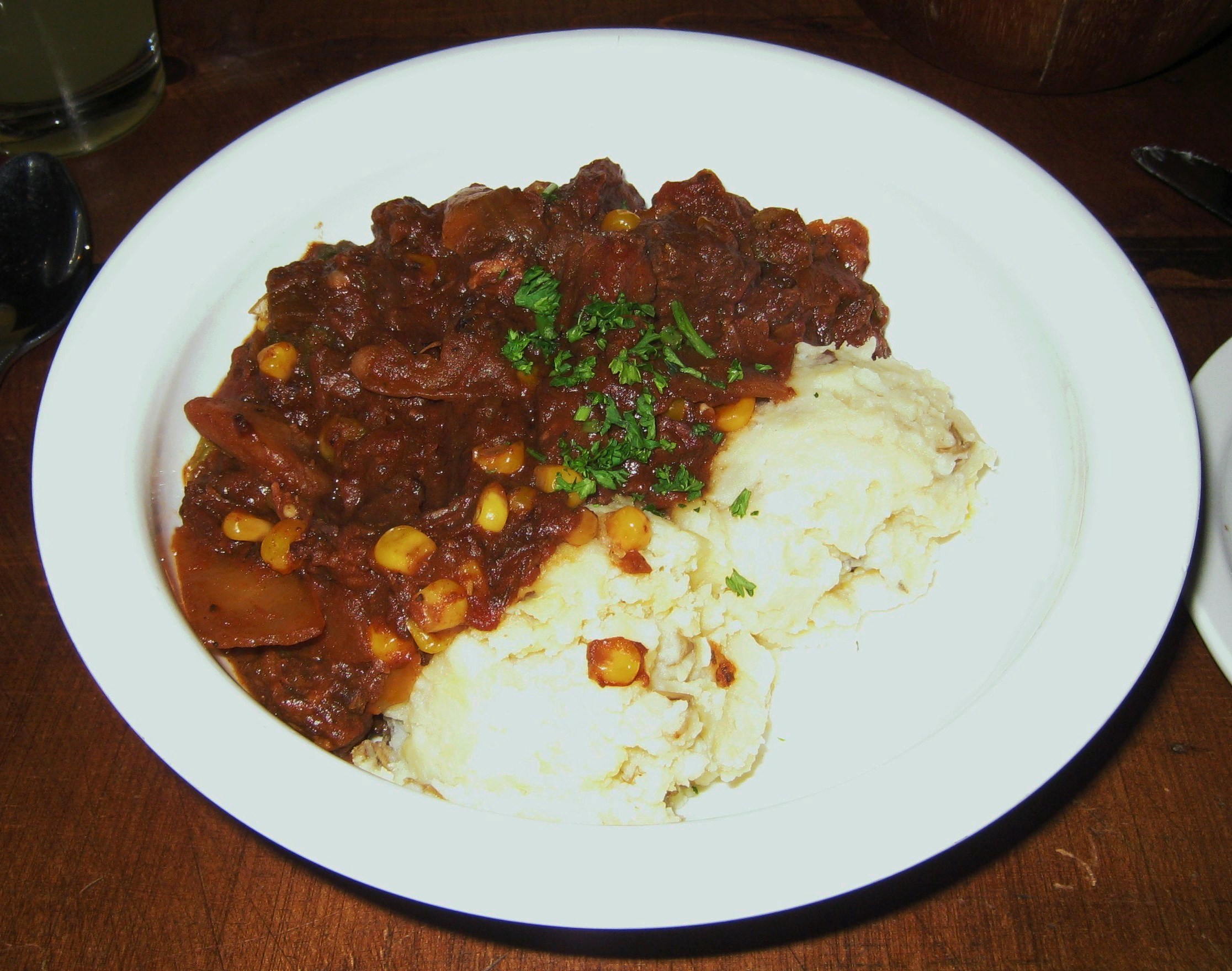
- Kentucky burgoo served with various side dishes
- Type: Stew
- Place of origin: North America, Great Britain
- Region or state: Kentucky, Illinois, Indiana, West Virginia, Tennessee
- Main ingredients: Meat (pork, chicken, or mutton)

Burgoo is a stew, similar to Irish or Mulligan stew, often served with cornbread or corn muffins, one form of which originated in Kentucky. It is often prepared communally as a social gathering. It is popular as the basis for civic fundraisers in the Upland South.

== Etymology ==
The term is of uncertain origin, possibly from the combination of the Welsh words for "yeast" and "cabbage". The Oxford English Dictionary lists the origin as "Arabic: būrgu̇l cooked, parched, and crushed wheat, ultimately [from] Turkish bulgur".

== History ==
The first OED reference in English is from 1743 in J. Isham Observ. Hudsons Bay, defined as "a soup or stew made with a variety of meat and vegetables, used especially at outdoor feasts. North American." A 1753 reference from Chambers's Cycl. Suppl. reads "Burgoo, a sea-faring dish", likely with associations to the Royal Navy and Merchant Navy (United Kingdom). An 1863 reference to G. A. Sala, Strange Adventures Capt. Dangerous (II.i.15)' specifies meat as an ingredient: "[He] had the best Beef and Burgoo at the Skipper's table."

== Preparation ==
Traditional burgoo was made in large quantities using whatever meats and vegetables were available. This frequently included squirrel, rabbit, and venison. In the present, domestic livestock meat such as beef, veal, pork, or lamb is more common.

A typical burgoo is a combination of meat and vegetables. Common meats are pork, chicken, beef, and/or mutton, often hickory-smoked, but other meats are seen occasionally. Common vegetables are lima beans, corn, okra, tomatoes, cabbage, and potatoes. Typically, since burgoo is a slow-cooked dish, the starch from the added vegetables results in the stew thickening. A thickening agent, such as cornmeal, ground beans, whole wheat, or potato starch, can be used when cooked in a nontraditional way. In addition, soup bone stocks can be added for taste and thickening.

The ingredients are combined in order of cooking time required, with meat first, vegetables next, and thickening agents as necessary. A spoon can reportedly stand up in a good burgoo. Cider vinegar, hot sauce, Worcestershire sauce, or chili powder are common condiments.

== Regional popularity ==
Cooking burgoo in Kentucky often serves as a communal effort at social event in which each attendee brings one or more ingredients. In Kentucky and surrounding states, such as Indiana and Tennessee, burgoo is often used for school fundraising. This has been claimed as an invention of the family of Ollie Beard, a former Major League Baseball player.

Many places hold great pride in their burgoos. It is a common feature in local events. The village of Arenzville, Illinois, asserts itself as the home of the world's best burgoo and holds a yearly burgoo festival, as do Chandlerville, Illinois and Utica, Illinois. Several cities claim to be the burgoo capital of the world, including Lawrenceburg, Kentucky, Owensboro, Kentucky, and Franklin, Illinois. In Brighton, Illinois, a local traditional burgoo is prepared and served annually at the village's summer festival, the Betsey Ann Picnic. At the Kentucky Derby, Burgoo is often served and is considered an iconic dish.

== See also ==
- Booyah, a social stew popular in parts of Minnesota and Wisconsin
- Brunswick stew
- Fish fry, often an event and social group fundraiser
- List of regional dishes of the United States
- List of stews
- List of meat dishes
- Southern Illinois chowder, another kind of social stew
