= Booyah (stew) =

American stew

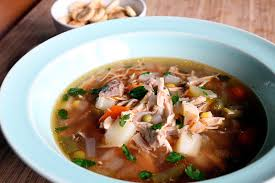
- American-style booyah stew
- Type: Stew
- Place of origin: United States
- Region or state: Upper Midwest
- Main ingredients: Meat (commonly beef, chicken, or pork), vegetables (carrots, peas, onion, celery, rutabagas potatoes), seasonings

Booyah (also spelled booya, bouja, boulyaw, and bouyou) is a thick stew believed to have originated in Belgium and been brought to northeastern Wisconsin by Walloons. It is made throughout the Upper Midwestern United States. Booyah can require up to two days and multiple cooks to prepare; it is cooked in specially designed "booyah kettles" and usually meant to serve hundreds or thousands of people. The name can also refer to a social event surrounding the meal.

== Description ==
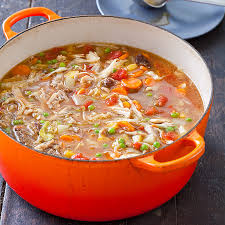
Booyah seasoned with peas, granulated vegetables and chicken

To cook booyah, one makes a base or broth derived from meat bones, to which vegetables are added. Beef, chicken, and pork are popular varieties of meat for booyah (with all three often in the same kettle), with vegetables such as carrots, peas, onions, and potatoes also in the mix. A wide variety of seasonings is used, sometimes lowered into the kettle in a cheesecloth bag. Typical large-scale booyah kettles can hold more than 50 US gallons (190 L) and are made from steel or cast iron to withstand direct heat and the long cooking time.

== Etymology ==
The term "booyah" may be a variant of "bouillon". It is thought to have derived from the Walloon language words for "boil" (bouillir) and "broth" (bouillon). The spelling with an H has been attributed to phonetic spelling by Wallonian immigrants. The Dictionary of American Regional English attributes the term to French Canadian immigrants; others attribute it to a derivation from the Provençal seafood dish bouillabaisse.

An article in the Green Bay Press-Gazette on October 29, 1976, speculating on the origin of the spelling and related fundraiser event, reads:

Lester (Rentmeester) relates recollections of his schoolteacher father, Andrew, probably the "pioneer" of the word "booyah." "At the old Finger Road School where he taught, funds were always in short supply," he recalls. "So my father hit on the idea of a community picnic to raise money for the school. He went around to parents and neighbors, gathering up beef and chickens for the traditional Belgian soup that would be the main dish at the benefit affair. And he also went down to the office of the old Green Bay Gazette, looking for publicity." The writer handling the news of the benefit picnic, so the story goes, asked what would be served. "Bouillon—we will have bouillon," came the reply, with the word pronounced properly in French. "The young reporter wrote it down as he heard it," Rentmeester relates. "It came out 'booyah' in the paper. It was booyah the first time it was served at Holy Martyrs of Gorcum Church—an affair my father also originated--and that's what people have called it ever since."

A November 19, 2015, Press-Gazette article repeats Rentmeester's claim, but also suggests that the dish "could have erupted as a tradition in multiple places at once". The article notes that several variations on the name "booyah" occur around the Upper Midwest that "appear to be attempts to phonetically manage the hard-to-spell word 'bouillon', and they all are pronounced roughly the same".

"Booyah" as a staple of lumberjack diets is mentioned as early as the 1880s in upper Wisconsin.

== Modern day ==
Booyah is still made in northern and northeastern Wisconsin, Minnesota, and Michigan's Upper Peninsula at county fairs, VFW gatherings, booyah-cooking contests, and in small amounts at private gatherings. According to a 2018 Post Crescent article, booyah was sold at church and other nonprofit fundraisers for $20 per gallon (4 liters). The Green Bay Booyah baseball team is named after the stew.

== See also ==
- Burgoo
- List of stews
- List of soups
