= Dial D. Ryder =

American gunsmith (1938–2011)

Dial Duwayne Ryder (June 12, 1938 – October 20, 2011) was an American gunsmith, who gave evidence to the investigation of the death of President John F. Kennedy.

== Assassination of President John Kennedy ==
Ryder worked at the Irving, Texas Sports Shop and stated that he possessed a record of Lee Harvey Oswald's name. The Warren Commission, which investigated the assassination of John F. Kennedy, looked into a report that Oswald had a telescopic sight mounted and sighted at the store in which Ryder was employed. Ryder showed agents of the Federal Bureau of Investigation, on November 25, 1963, a tag which he claimed was in Oswald's handwriting. The undated tag, with the name OSWALD, attested that three holes had been drilled into an unspecified kind of rifle. Further, a telescopic sight had been mounted on the rifle and boresighted. The customer paid $4.50 for drilling and $1.50 for boresighting the rifle.

Neither Dial or his employer, Charles W. Greener, believed that they had worked on the gun. Dial told author Leo Sauvage the rifle Oswald ordered from Chicago, Illinois came equipped with a telescopic sight. He elaborated, saying that the rifle with the undated tag must have been another weapon than the one Oswald received by mail, in March 1963. Dial stated either it was another rifle or another Oswald.

Ryder believed that a close inspection of the 6.5 mm Mannlicher Carcano owned by Oswald would reveal that neither he or his shop worked on the gun.

== Personal life ==
Ryder was born in Claremont, Illinois. In 1945, Ryder moved with his family to Irving, Texas and graduated from Irving High School. He served in the Texas National Guard and the United States Army.
