= Madison Township, Richland County, Illinois =

Madison Township
- Township

- Location of Illinois in the United States
- Coordinates: 38°36′46″N 88°05′01″W
- Country: United States
- State: Illinois
- County: Richland
- Settled: November 4, 1879

Government
  - Mayor: David Spain

Area
  - Total: 40.85 sq mi (105.8 km^{2})
  - Land: 40.83 sq mi (105.7 km^{2})
  - Water: 0.02 sq mi (0.052 km^{2})
- Elevation: 459 ft (140 m)

Population (2010)
  - Estimate (2016): 808
  - Density: 20.1/sq mi (7.8/km^{2})
- Time zone: UTC-6 (CST)
  - Summer (DST): UTC-5 (CDT)
- FIPS code: 17-159-46006

Madison Township is located in Richland County, Illinois. As of the 2010 census, its population was 819 and it contained 385 housing units.

== Geography ==
According to the 2010 census, the township has a total area of 40.85 square miles (105.8 km^{2}), of which 40.83 square miles (105.7 km^{2}) (or 99.95%) is land and 0.02 square miles (0.052 km^{2}) (or 0.05%) is water.

== Demographics ==
Historical population
Census	Pop.	Note	%±
2016 (est.)	808
U.S. Decennial Census
