= Olney Township, Richland County, Illinois =

Olney Township
- Township

- Location of Illinois in the United States
- Coordinates: 38°42′34″N 88°05′07″W
- Country: United States
- State: Illinois
- County: Richland
- Settled: November 4, 1879

Area
  - Total: 48.08 sq mi (124.5 km^{2})
  - Land: 47.14 sq mi (122.1 km^{2})
  - Water: 0.94 sq mi (2.4 km^{2})
- Elevation: 459 ft (140 m)

Population (2010)
  - Estimate (2016): 10,138
  - Density: 219.2/sq mi (84.6/km^{2})
- Time zone: UTC-6 (CST)
  - Summer (DST): UTC-5 (CDT)
- FIPS code: 17-159-55925

Olney Township is located in Richland County, Illinois. As of the 2010 census, its population was 10,334 and it contained 4,836 housing units.

== Geography ==
According to the 2010 census, the township has a total area of 48.08 square miles (124.5 km^{2}), of which 47.14 square miles (122.1 km^{2}) (or 98.04%) is land and 0.94 square miles (2.4 km^{2}) (or 1.96%) is water.

== Demographics ==
Historical population
Census	Pop.	Note	%±
2016 (est.)	10,138
U.S. Decennial Census
