= Dundas, Illinois =

- Census-designated place
- Location within Illinois Location within the United States
- Coordinates: 38°50′05″N 88°05′08″W
- Country: United States
- State: Illinois
- County: Richland

Area
  - Total: 0.67 sq mi (1.73 km^{2})
  - Land: 0.67 sq mi (1.73 km^{2})
  - Water: 0 sq mi (0.00 km^{2})
- Elevation: 479 ft (146 m)

Population (2020)
  - Total: 146
  - Density: 218.2/sq mi (84.23/km^{2})
- Time zone: UTC-6 (Central (CST))
  - Summer (DST): UTC-5 (CDT)
- ZIP code: 62425
- Area code: 618
- FIPS code: 17-21020
- GNIS feature ID: 2804652

Dundas is an unincorporated community and census-designated place in Richland County, Illinois, United States. Dundas is 7 miles (11 km) north of Olney. Dundas has a post office with ZIP code 62425. As of the 2020 census, Dundas had a population of 146.

== Demographics ==
Historical population
Census	Pop.	Note	%±
2020	146		—
U.S. Decennial Census

Dundas first appeared as a census designated place in the 2020 U.S. census.
