= Wynoose, Illinois =

- Unincorporated community
- Location within Illinois Location within the United States
- Coordinates: 38°35′55″N 88°13′19″W
- Country: United States
- State: Illinois
- Counties: Richland and Wayne
- Elevation: 430 ft (130 m)
- Time zone: UTC-6 (Central (CST))
  - Summer (DST): UTC-5 (CDT)
- Area code: 618
- GNIS feature ID: 421540

Wynoose is an unincorporated community in Richland and Wayne counties, Illinois, United States. Wynoose is 6 miles (9.7 km) north of Mount Erie.
