= Decker Township, Richland County, Illinois =

Decker Township
- Township

- Location of Illinois in the United States
- Coordinates: 38°38′06″N 88°12′50″W
- Country: United States
- State: Illinois
- County: Richland
- Settled: November 4, 1879

Area
  - Total: 35.26 sq mi (91.3 km^{2})
  - Land: 35.23 sq mi (91.2 km^{2})
  - Water: 0.03 sq mi (0.078 km^{2})
- Elevation: 459 ft (140 m)

Population (2010)
  - Estimate (2016): 401
  - Density: 11.5/sq mi (4.4/km^{2})
- Time zone: UTC-6 (CST)
  - Summer (DST): UTC-5 (CDT)
- FIPS code: 17-159-18862

Decker Township is located in Richland County, Illinois. As of the 2010 census, its population was 406 and it contained 170 housing units.

== History ==
Decker Township bears the name of Thomas J. Decker, a local pioneer. Before May 2, 1859, the township was known as Jackson Township.

== Geography ==
According to the 2010 census, the township has a total area of 35.26 square miles (91.3 km^{2}), of which 35.23 square miles (91.2 km^{2}) (or 99.91%) is land and 0.03 square miles (0.078 km^{2}) (or 0.09%) is water.

== Demographics ==
Historical population
Census	Pop.	Note	%±
2016 (est.)	401
U.S. Decennial Census
