= Claremont Township, Richland County, Illinois =

Claremont Township
- Township

- Location of Illinois in the United States
- Coordinates: 38°42′24″N 87°58′13″W
- Country: United States
- State: Illinois
- County: Richland
- Settled: November 4, 1879

Area
  - Total: 44.12 sq mi (114.3 km^{2})
  - Land: 44.09 sq mi (114.2 km^{2})
  - Water: 0.03 sq mi (0.078 km^{2})
- Elevation: 512 ft (156 m)

Population (2010)
  - Estimate (2016): 837
  - Density: 19.4/sq mi (7.5/km^{2})
- Time zone: UTC-6 (CST)
  - Summer (DST): UTC-5 (CDT)
- FIPS code: 17-159-14546

Claremont Township is located in Richland County, Illinois. As of the 2010 census, its population was 855 and it contained 377 housing units.

== Geography ==
According to the 2010 census, the township has a total area of 44.12 square miles (114.3 km^{2}), of which 44.09 square miles (114.2 km^{2}) (or 99.93%) is land and 0.03 square miles (0.078 km^{2}) (or 0.07%) is water.

== Demographics ==
Historical population
Census	Pop.	Note	%±
2016 (est.)	837
U.S. Decennial Census
