= Olney, Illinois =

- City
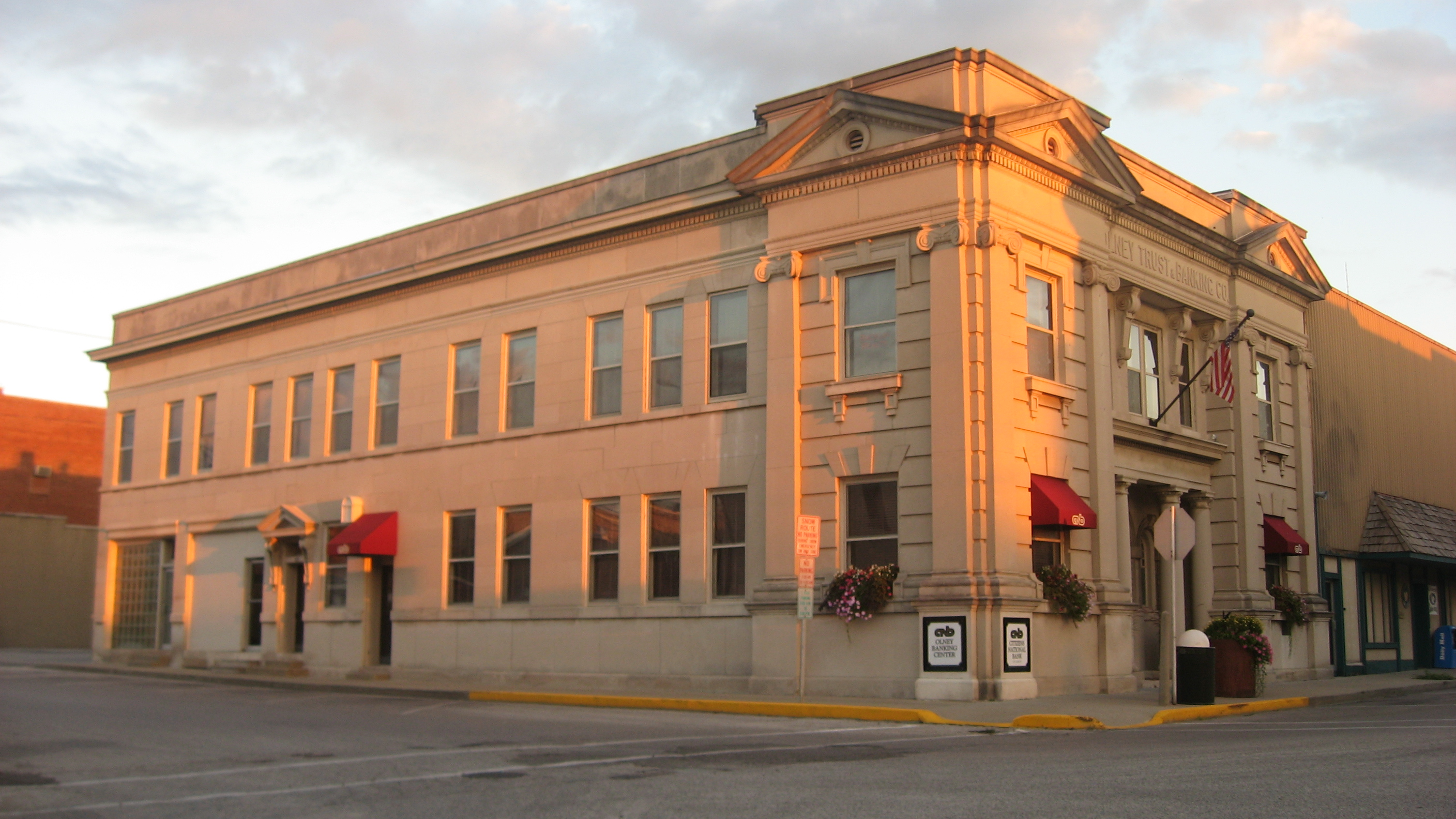
- Front and northern side of the former Olney CNB Bank, located at 202 S. Whittle Street in Olney

- Flag logo
- Motto: "Home of the White Squirrel"
- Interactive map of Olney, Illinois
- Location within Illinois Location within the United States
- Coordinates: 38°43′42″N 88°05′02″W
- Country: United States
- State: Illinois
- County: Richland
- Founded: 1848

Government
  - Mayor: Mark Lambird

Area
  - Total: 6.93 sq mi (17.95 km^{2})
  - Land: 6.93 sq mi (17.95 km^{2})
  - Water: 0 sq mi (0.00 km^{2})
- Elevation: 489 ft (149 m)

Population (2020)
  - Total: 8,701
  - Density: 1,255/sq mi (484.7/km^{2})
- Time zone: UTC-6 (CST)
  - Summer (DST): UTC-5 (CDT)
- ZIP Code: 62450
- Area codes: 618 and 730
- FIPS code: 17–55912
- GNIS feature ID: 2396060
- Wikimedia Commons: Olney, Illinois
- Website: www.ci.olney.il.us

Olney (/ˈɔːlni/ AWL-nee) is a city in and the county seat of Richland County, Illinois, United States. As of the 2020 census, Olney had a population of 8,701.

== History ==
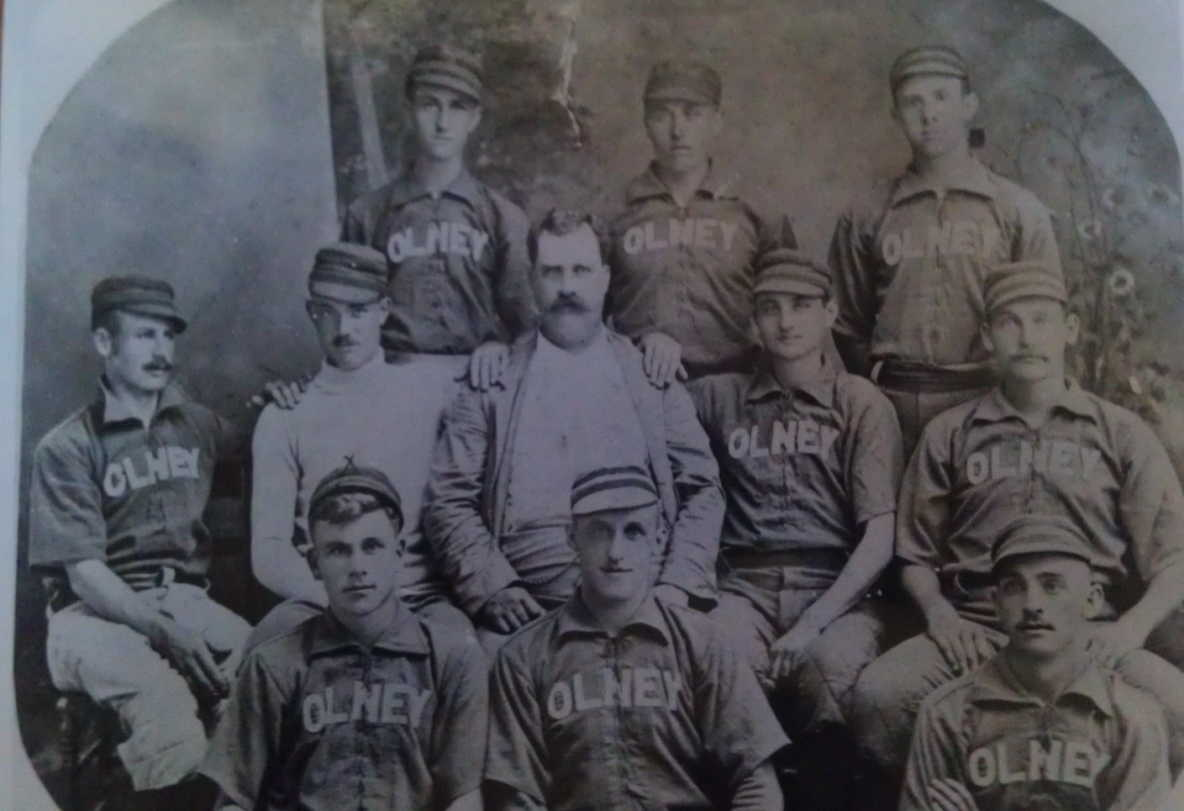
Olney, IL, Baseball Team, 1893. Ollie Pickering, top row, far right.

Settlement of the Richland County area began around 1815 when Thaddeus Morehouse, a native of Vermont, arrived by wagon and built a log cabin along a stagecoach route that ran from Vincennes, Indiana to St. Louis. This log cabin operated as a hotel and tavern.

Richland County was organized as a county in 1841, when it was formed by a partitioning of Clay and Lawrence counties. There was some controversy regarding the location of the county seat; however, Olney was determined as the choice based on a donation of land and the central location. The name of the town Olney was suggested by Judge Aaron Shaw who desired to honor a friend, Nathan Olney. It was not until 1848 that Olney was incorporated as a village.

The Civil War brought a great deal of turmoil to the county as there were sympathies for both sides. While most citizens rallied around the Union it was necessary to have troops stationed in Olney to enforce the draft as union deserters found refuge among local citizens. Overall, the county was pro-Union and an estimated 1,700 Richland County citizens fought for the Union in the Civil war. Nearly 1,000 Olney residents served in World War I, and during World War II, Richland County may have been the only Illinois county outside of Cook that provided four generals for the war effort.

Among the mayors of Olney was J. B. Porter, noted as an ex-mayor in a 1912 note about his being wounded by gunfire after whipping a man over some unresolved quarrel.

The first census of Richland County was in 1850 at which time 4,012 people resided in the county. One hundred years later the 1950 census found a spot north of Olney near Dundas to be the population center of the United States.

== Geography ==
According to the 2010 census, Olney has a total area of 6.664 square miles (17.26 km^{2}), of which 6.66 square miles (17.25 km^{2}) (or 99.94%) is land and 0.004 square miles (0.01 km^{2}) (or 0.06%) is water.

=== Climate ===
Climate data for Olney 2S, Illinois (1991–2020 normals, extremes 1896–present)
Month	Jan	Feb	Mar	Apr	May	Jun	Jul	Aug	Sep	Oct	Nov	Dec	Year
Record high °F (°C)	75 (24)	78 (26)	89 (32)	91 (33)	98 (37)	106 (41)	112 (44)	109 (43)	106 (41)	97 (36)	83 (28)	74 (23)	112 (44)
Mean daily maximum °F (°C)	37.8 (3.2)	42.7 (5.9)	53.4 (11.9)	65.6 (18.7)	75.1 (23.9)	84.1 (28.9)	86.8 (30.4)	85.8 (29.9)	80.4 (26.9)	68.5 (20.3)	53.9 (12.2)	42.3 (5.7)	64.7 (18.2)
Daily mean °F (°C)	29.3 (−1.5)	33.3 (0.7)	42.9 (6.1)	54.2 (12.3)	64.2 (17.9)	73.2 (22.9)	76.2 (24.6)	74.8 (23.8)	68.1 (20.1)	56.4 (13.6)	43.7 (6.5)	34.0 (1.1)	54.2 (12.3)
Mean daily minimum °F (°C)	20.8 (−6.2)	23.9 (−4.5)	32.3 (0.2)	42.7 (5.9)	53.3 (11.8)	62.4 (16.9)	65.6 (18.7)	63.8 (17.7)	55.8 (13.2)	44.3 (6.8)	33.5 (0.8)	25.7 (−3.5)	43.7 (6.5)
Record low °F (°C)	−24 (−31)	−25 (−32)	−15 (−26)	21 (−6)	29 (−2)	36 (2)	45 (7)	41 (5)	27 (−3)	17 (−8)	−2 (−19)	−19 (−28)	−25 (−32)
Average precipitation inches (mm)	3.52 (89)	2.57 (65)	4.21 (107)	5.02 (128)	5.60 (142)	4.79 (122)	4.96 (126)	3.19 (81)	3.31 (84)	3.83 (97)	4.26 (108)	3.50 (89)	48.76 (1,239)
Average snowfall inches (cm)	3.6 (9.1)	2.6 (6.6)	1.1 (2.8)	0.0 (0.0)	0.0 (0.0)	0.0 (0.0)	0.0 (0.0)	0.0 (0.0)	0.0 (0.0)	0.0 (0.0)	0.5 (1.3)	2.7 (6.9)	10.5 (27)
Average precipitation days (≥ 0.01 in)	10.6	8.7	11.8	11.2	12.7	10.5	9.2	8.1	7.7	9.1	9.6	10.9	120.1
Average snowy days (≥ 0.1 in)	2.9	2.1	0.7	0.0	0.0	0.0	0.0	0.0	0.0	0.0	0.4	1.9	8.0
Source: NOAA

== Demographics ==
Historical population
Census	Pop.	Note	%±
1860	1,435		—
1870	2,680		86.8%
1880	3,512		31.0%
1890	3,831		9.1%
1900	4,260		11.2%
1910	5,011		17.6%
1920	4,491		−10.4%
1930	6,140		36.7%
1940	7,831		27.5%
1950	8,612		10.0%
1960	8,780		2.0%
1970	8,974		2.2%
1980	9,026		0.6%
1990	8,664		−4.0%
2000	8,631		−0.4%
2010	9,115		5.6%
2020	8,701		−4.5%
U.S. Decennial Census

=== 2020 census ===
As of the 2020 census, Olney had a population of 8,701. The median age was 41.8 years. 22.7% of residents were under the age of 18 and 22.2% of residents were 65 years of age or older. For every 100 females there were 90.7 males, and for every 100 females age 18 and over there were 85.9 males age 18 and over.

98.9% of residents lived in urban areas, while 1.1% lived in rural areas.

There were 3,715 households in Olney, of which 27.7% had children under the age of 18 living in them. Of all households, 38.8% were married-couple households, 20.2% were households with a male householder and no spouse or partner present, and 33.4% were households with a female householder and no spouse or partner present. About 37.1% of all households were made up of individuals and 18.5% had someone living alone who was 65 years of age or older.

There were 4,170 housing units, of which 10.9% were vacant. The homeowner vacancy rate was 2.1% and the rental vacancy rate was 12.3%.

Racial composition as of the 2020 census
Race	Number	Percent
White	8,034	92.3%
Black or African American	66	0.8%
American Indian and Alaska Native	28	0.3%
Asian	107	1.2%
Native Hawaiian and Other Pacific Islander	5	0.1%
Some other race	61	0.7%
Two or more races	400	4.6%
Hispanic or Latino (of any race)	222	2.6%

=== 2000 census ===
As of the census of 2000, there were 8,631 people, 3,755 households, and 2,301 families residing in the city. The population density was 1,498.4 inhabitants per square mile (578.5/km^{2}). There were 4,283 housing units at an average density of 743.5 units per square mile (287.1 units/km^{2}). The racial makeup of the city was 97.67% White, 0.48% African American, 0.16% Native American, 0.64% Asian, 0.03% Pacific Islander, 0.32% from other races, and 0.70% from two or more races. Hispanic or Latino people of any race were 0.96% of the population.

There were 3,755 households, out of which 28.2% had children under the age of 18 living with them, 47.4% were married couples living together, 10.6% had a female householder with no husband present, and 38.7% were non-families. 33.7% of all households were made up of individuals, and 17.3% had someone living alone who was 65 years of age or older. The average household size was 2.26 and the average family size was 2.89.

In the city, the population was spread out, with 23.8% under the age of 18, 9.1% from 18 to 24, 25.6% from 25 to 44, 21.0% from 45 to 64, and 20.5% who were 65 years of age or older. The median age was 39 years. For every 100 females, there were 86.9 males. For every 100 females age 18 and over, there were 82.4 males.

The median income for a household in the city was $28,084 and the median income for a family was $37,365. Males had a median income of $29,547 versus $18,440 for females. The per capita income for the city was $16,218. About 13.0% of families and 17.0% of the population were below the poverty line, including 21.9% of those under age 18 and 8.0% of those age 65 or over.

The city is well known for its population of albino Grey Squirrels. Volunteers in Olney conduct an annual white squirrel count in October.

== Government ==
The City of Olney government consists of a part-time mayor, four city council members, and a full-time city manager. The mayor (as of 2021) was Mark Lambird.

== Education ==
=== Post-secondary education ===
- Olney Central College

=== Public education ===
- Richland County High School
- Richland County Middle School

=== Private education ===
- St. Joseph Catholic School Pre-K to 8th Grade
- Full Armor Christian School Pre-K to 8th Grade

== Notable people ==
- Terry L. Bruce, Illinois state senator and United States congressman; born in Olney
- Glenn Brummer, catcher for the St. Louis Cardinals and Texas Rangers
- Glenn Goodart, hotel manager and politician; died in Olney in 1948
- Reginald C. Harmon, first U.S. Air Force judge advocate general; mayor of Urbana, Illinois; born in Olney
- James R. Lindsay, U.S. Army brigadier general; born in Olney
- Butch Lockley, reality television personality known for Survivor: The Amazon
- Herbert Murphy, shortstop for the Philadelphia Phillies; born in Olney
- Ollie Pickering, outfielder for the six Major League Baseball teams; born in Olney
- Stan Royer, infielder for the Boston Red Sox and St. Louis Cardinals; born in Olney
- Elaine Shepard, actress; born in Olney

== Media ==
Olney is served by the Olney Gazette, a weekly newspaper founded in 2017.

WUSI-TV (Channel 16) is licensed to Olney. Its studio and transmitter are located outside of town. WUSI-TV is a PBS affiliate and WSIU-TV simulcast operated by the Broadcasting Service of Southern Illinois University.

Olney has a handful of radio stations licensed to the town. These include WPTH, WSEI, WUSI-FM, and WVLN.
