= Bone Gap, Illinois =

- Village
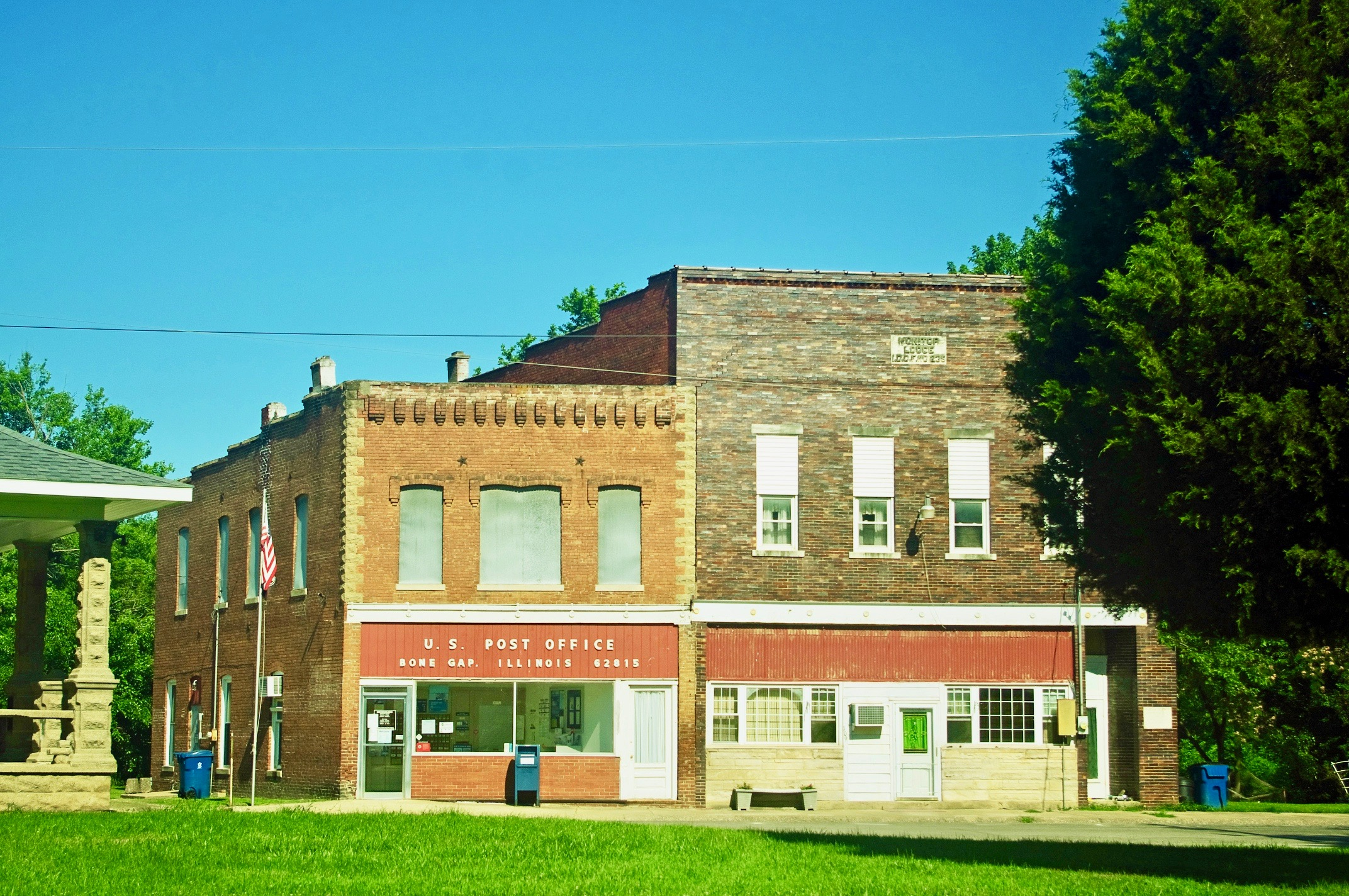
- Post office (left) and IOOF building

- Location of Bone Gap in Edwards County, Illinois.
- Coordinates: 38°26′41″N 87°00′01″W
- Country: United States
- State: Illinois
- County: Edwards

Area
  - Total: 0.58 sq mi (1.51 km^{2})
  - Land: 0.58 sq mi (1.51 km^{2})
  - Water: 0 sq mi (0.00 km^{2})
- Elevation: 469 ft (143 m)

Population (2020)
  - Total: 181
  - Density: 310.5/sq mi (119.89/km^{2})
- Time zone: UTC−6 (CST)
  - Summer (DST): UTC−5 (CDT)
- ZIP code: 62815
- Area code: 618
- FIPS code: 17-07224
- GNIS ID: 2398150

Bone Gap is a village in Edwards County, Illinois, United States. The population was 181 at the 2020 census, down from 246 at the 2010 census.

== History ==
According to local historians, the Piankeshaw Indians established a village in the vicinity of modern Bone Gap prior to the arrival of permanent European settlers. This village was situated in a gap in the treeline. When the first permanent European settlers arrived in 1830, they found a large number of discarded animal bones left by the Piankeshaw inhabitants, and named the settlement "Bone Gap."

Surnames among early settlers included Rude, Morgan, Knowlton, Phillips, Leach, Gibson, Rice, and Gould, the latter belonging to Methodist minister Ebenezer Gould. Many of the settlers came from northeastern states, and the community that developed became known as "Yankeetown." This area, now known as "Old Bone Gap" as it was situated just east of the current village, consisted of a store, post office, doctor's office, blacksmith shop, a Baptist church, and a Methodist parsonage. The current village of Bone Gap voted 38–7 to incorporate on March 29, 1892.

== Geography ==
Bone Gap is located in northeastern Edwards County 7 miles (11 km) northeast of Albion, the county seat. Illinois State Route 130 passes just to the west.

According to the 2010 census, Bone Gap has a total area of 0.6 square miles (1.55 km^{2}), all land.

== Demographics ==
Historical population
Census	Pop.	Note	%±
1900	496		—
1910	517		4.2%
1920	455		−12.0%
1930	364		−20.0%
1940	385		5.8%
1950	327		−15.1%
1960	245		−25.1%
1970	308		25.7%
1980	350		13.6%
1990	271		−22.6%
2000	272		0.4%
2010	246		−9.6%
2020	181		−26.4%
U.S. Decennial Census

As of the 2020 census there were 181 people, 65 households, and 37 families residing in the village. The population density was 310.46 inhabitants per square mile (119.87/km^{2}). There were 93 housing units at an average density of 159.52 per square mile (61.59/km^{2}). The racial makeup of the village was 96.69% White, 1.10% African American, and 2.21% from two or more races. None of the population was Hispanic or Latino of any race.

There were 65 households, out of which 20.0% had children under the age of 18 living with them, 50.77% were married couples living together, 6.15% had a female householder with no husband present, and 43.08% were non-families. 41.54% of all households were made up of individuals, and 20.00% had someone living alone who was 65 years of age or older. The average household size was 3.30 and the average family size was 2.32.

The village's age distribution consisted of 19.9% under the age of 18, 15.9% from 18 to 24, 19.9% from 25 to 44, 27.8% from 45 to 64, and 16.6% who were 65 years of age or older. The median age was 39.5 years. For every 100 females, there were 79.8 males. For every 100 females age 18 and over, there were 83.3 males.

The median income for a household in the village was $41,250, and the median income for a family was $100,096. Males had a median income of $46,250 versus $32,500 for females. The per capita income for the village was $19,083. About 8.1% of families and 6.0% of the population were below the poverty line, including none of those under age 18 and 12.0% of those age 65 or over.

== Notable people ==
- Cy Warmoth, pitcher for the St. Louis Cardinals and Washington Senators; born in Bone Gap
