= Illinois World War II Army Airfields =

United States World War II army airfields

Illinois World War II Army Airfields
- Part of United States Army

Site information
- Type: Army Airfields

Site history
- Built: 1940-1944
- In use: 1940-present

During World War II, the United States Army Air Forces (USAAF) established numerous airfields in Illinois for training pilots and aircrews of USAAF fighters and bombers.

Most of these airfields were under the command of First Air Force or the Army Air Forces Training Command (AAFTC). However, the other USAAF support commands (Air Technical Service Command (ATSC); Air Transport Command (ATC) or Troop Carrier Command) commanded a significant number of airfields in a support roles.

It is still possible to find remnants of these wartime airfields. Many were converted into municipal airports, some were returned to agriculture and several were retained as United States Air Force installations and were front-line bases during the Cold War. Hundreds of the temporary buildings that were used survive today and are being used for other purposes.

== Major airfields ==
Army Air Force Training Command

- Chanute Field, Rantoul

Eastern Technical Training Center (Metrological School; adv. Specialities)
9th Army Air Force Base Unit
Was: Chanute Air Force Base (1917-1993)
Now: Rantoul National Aviation Center (ICAO: KTIP, FAA LID: TIP)

- Curtis-Parks AAF, East St. Louis

Contract Pilot School
Now: St. Louis Downtown Airport

- George Army Airfield, Lawrenceville

AAF Southeast Training Center
327th Army Air Force Base Unit
Now: Lawrenceville-Vincennes International Airport (IATA: LWV, ICAO: KLWV, FAA LID: LWV)
- Atterbury Army Airfield, Columbus, Indiana

Sub-base of George AAF
Now: Columbus Municipal Airport (IATA: CLU, ICAO: KBAK, FAA LID: BAK)

- Sturgis Army Airfield, Sturgis, Kentucky

Sub-base of George AAF
Now: Sturgis Municipal Airport (ICAO: KTWT, FAA LID: TWT)

Air Transport Command

- Scott Field, AAF, Belleville

8th Army Air Force Base Unit
Now: Scott Air Force Base (IATA: BLV, ICAO: KBLV, FAA LID: BLV)

Air Technical Service Command

- Chicago MAP, Chicago

395th Army Air Force Base Unit
Joint use USAAF/Civil Airport
Now: the Scottsdale neighborhood in Chicago, and the southeast side of Burbank, Illinois (see Ashburn Flying Field)

- Orchard Place Airport/Douglas Army Airfield, Chicago

Joint use USAAF/Civil Airport
Later a joint use civil-military airport as O'Hare International Airport & O'Hare Air Reserve Station
Now: O'Hare International Airport (IATA: ORD, ICAO: KORD, FAA LID: ORD)
