= Lawrenceville–Vincennes International Airport =

Airport in Lawrence County, Illinois

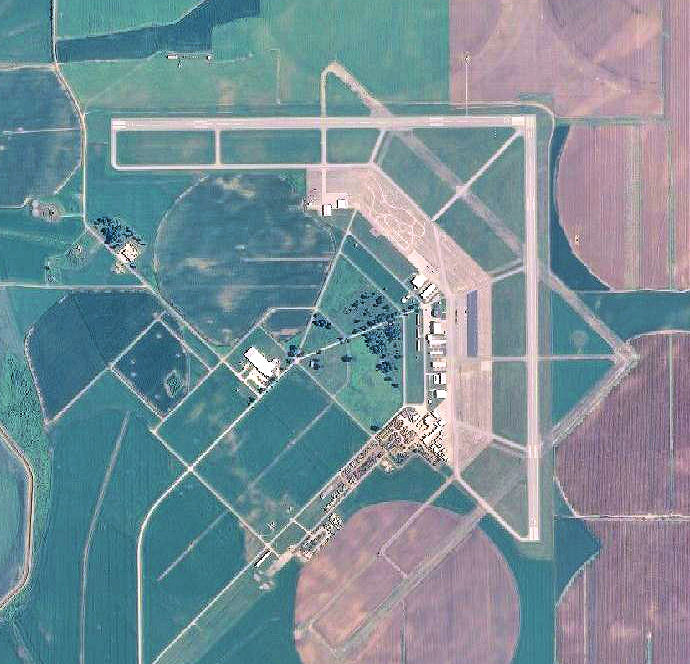
- USGS 2006 orthophoto
- IATA: LWV; ICAO: KLWV; FAA LID: LWV

Summary
- Airport type: Public
- Owner: Bi-State Authority
- Serves: Lawrenceville, Illinois / Vincennes, Indiana
- Location: Allison Township, Lawrence County
- Opened: 1942
- Time zone: UTC−06:00 (-6)
  - Summer (DST): UTC−05:00 (-5)
- Elevation AMSL: 430 ft / 131 m
- Coordinates: 38°45′51″N 87°36′20″W

Map
- Location of airport in Illinois LWV (the United States)

Runways
Direction	Length		Surface
Direction	ft	m	Surface
18/36	5,199	1,585	Asphalt
9/27	5,198	1,584	Asphalt
4U/22U	1,000	305	Turf

Statistics (2021)
- Aircraft operations: 35,000
- Based aircraft: 41
- Source: Federal Aviation Administration

for the World War II use of the airport, see George Army Airfield

Lawrenceville–Vincennes International Airport (IATA: LWV, ICAO: KLWV, FAA LID: LWV) is a public use airport in Lawrence County, Illinois, United States. Owned by the Bi-State Authority, it is located three nautical miles (6 km) northeast of the city of Lawrenceville, Illinois and also serves the city of Vincennes in Knox County, Indiana. This airport is included in the National Plan of Integrated Airport Systems for 2011–2015, which categorized it as a general aviation facility.

== History ==
The airport was established in 1942 by the United States Army Air Forces. It was then known as George Army Airfield, named after Brig Gen Harold H. George who had been killed in April 1942. It was assigned to the Eastern Flying Training Command on August 10. It conducted advanced two-engine flying training until it was transferred to I Troop Carrier Command on August 15, 1944.

The airport was placed in standby status on September 1, 1944, with the drawdown of AAFTC's pilot training program. It was declared surplus and turned over to the Army Corps of Engineers on September 30, 1945. It was eventually discharged to the War Assets Administration (WAA) and became a civil airport.

The airport had airline service at one time. According to the Allegheny Airlines timetable of April 27, 1969, Allegheny Airlines provided two departures on weekdays and one on weekends with a routing of Lawrenceville-Terre Haute-Indianapolis using Nord 262 aircraft. The Allegheny timetable of December 15, 1969 changed the service to one weekday flight, with no weekend service and a routing of Lawrenceville-Evansville-Cincinnati, using the larger Convair 580 aircraft. By April 1970, there was no more service with Allegheny.

== Facilities and aircraft ==
Lawrenceville–Vincennes International Airport covers an area of 3,067 acres (1,241 ha) at an elevation of 430 feet (131 m) above mean sea level. It has two asphalt paved runways: runway 18/36 is 5,199 by 100 feet (1,585 x 30 m) and runway 9/27 is 5,198 by 100 feet (1,584 x 30 m). The airport also has one unpaved turf runway designated 4U/22U, which measures 1,000 by 200 feet (305 x 61 m).

The airport has an FBO that offers fuel for aircraft. Line services such as cargo and ground handling, catering, deicing, ground power units, hangars, and parking are available. Snooze rooms, a lounge, weather briefing kiosks, and courtesy cars are also available.

For the 12-month period ending May 31, 2022, the airport had 35,000 aircraft operations, an average of 96 per day: 87% general aviation, 11% air taxi, and <1% military. At that time there were 54 aircraft based at this airport: 33 single-engine and 2 multi-engine airplanes, 18 gliders, and 1 jet.

== Current Activity ==
The Lawrenceville–Vincennes International Airport is home to the Wabash Valley Soaring Club. The club owns six gliders for pilot use around the airport.

The club has two hangars with a clubroom attached to the main hangar, and a climate controlled shop for maintaining the club fleet. The shop is used also for restoration of member projects. Many WVSA members are involved with the Vintage Sailplane Association and are active in the restoration and flying of older gliders and sailplanes.

Over a long Father's Day weekend, WVSA hosts the annual Midwest Vintage/Classic Sailplane Regatta. Many pilots bring vintage and classic gliders from all over the country for this annual event.

== Accidents & Incidents ==
- On October 26, 2006, a Beechcraft BE-95 Travel Air crashed while shooting a nonprecision instrument approach into the airport. Instrument meteorological conditions prevailed at the time. The pilot at the controls had a private pilot certificate with multiengine and instrument ratings. The cause of the accident was found to be the pilot's decision to execute an approach to an airport with weather conditions below required minimums and the pilot's continued descent below the approach's minimum descent altitude.
- On August 29, 2020, a Cirrus SR22 flown by Judge Ryan Johanningsmeier crashed about 1.5 miles north of the north end of runway 18 while trying to land at the airport. ATC lost communications with the pilot after clearing him for an instrument approach despite multiple attempts to reestablish. Johanningsmeier died in the crash.

== See also ==
- List of airports in Illinois
