= Billett, Illinois =

- Unincorporated community
- Location within Illinois Location within the United States
- Coordinates: 38°39′52″N 87°39′08″W
- Country: United States
- State: Illinois
- County: Lawrence
- Township: Denison
- Elevation: 420 ft (130 m)
- Time zone: UTC-6 (Central (CST))
  - Summer (DST): UTC-5 (CDT)
- Area code: 618
- GNIS feature ID: 404445

Billett is an unincorporated community in Lawrence County, Illinois, United States. Billett is 5 miles (8.0 km) south-southeast of Lawrenceville.

The elevation of Billett is 423 feet and falls under the Central Time Zone (UTC -6 hours).
