= Petrolia, Illinois =

- Unincorporated community
- Location within Illinois Location within the United States
- Coordinates: 38°45′38″N 87°46′44″W
- Country: United States
- State: Illinois
- County: Lawrence
- Township: Petty
- Elevation: 453 ft (138 m)
- Time zone: UTC-6 (Central (CST))
  - Summer (DST): UTC-5 (CDT)
- Area code: 618
- GNIS feature ID: 415592

Petrolia is an unincorporated community in Lawrence County, Illinois, United States. Petrolia is 5.5 miles (8.9 km) west-northwest of Lawrenceville.
