= St. Francisville, Illinois =

- City
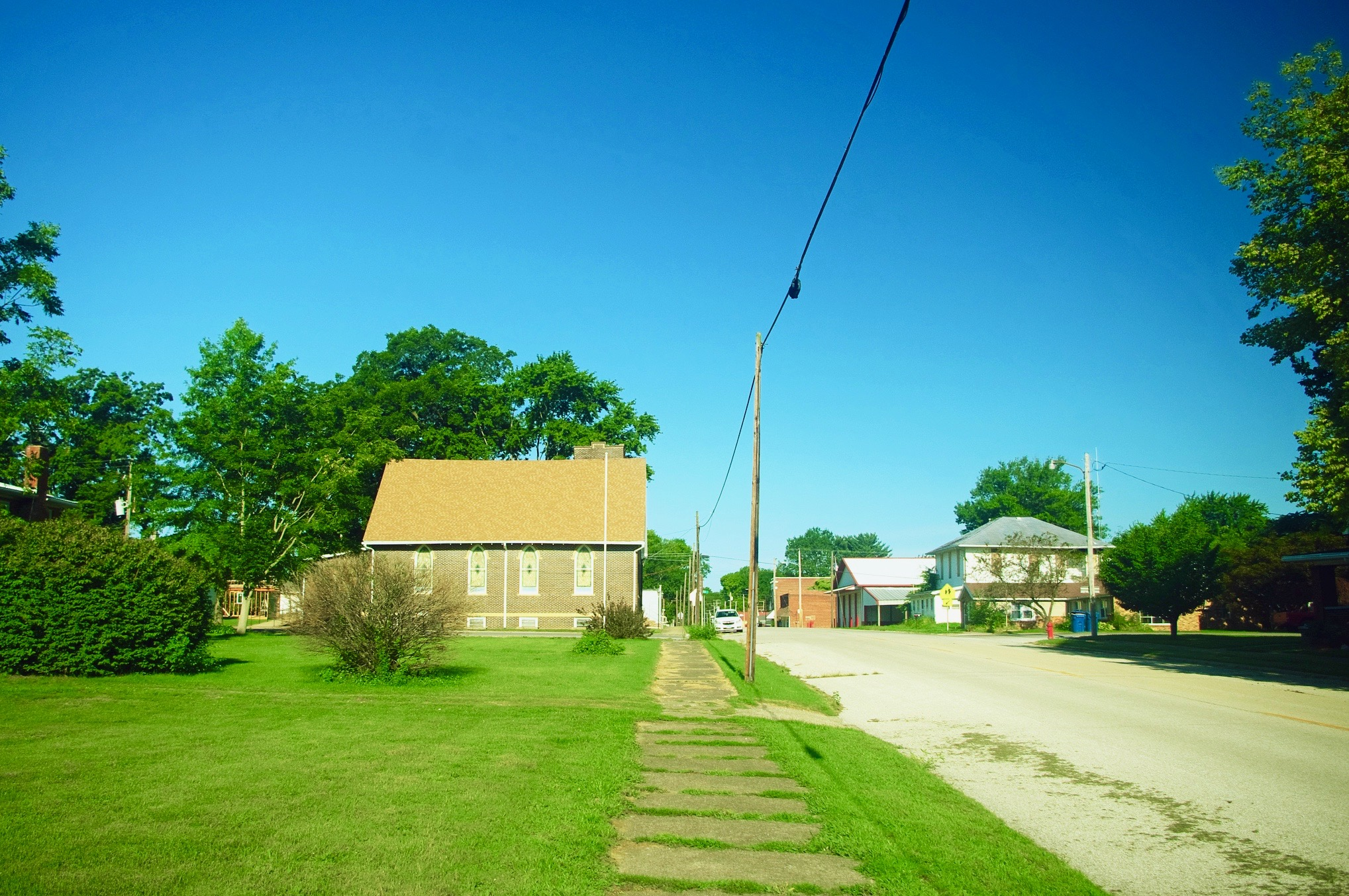
- Main Street

- Location in Lawrence County, Illinois
- Coordinates: 38°35′31″N 87°38′51″W
- Country: United States
- State: Illinois
- County: Lawrence
- Township: Denison

Area
  - Total: 0.78 sq mi (2.02 km^{2})
  - Land: 0.75 sq mi (1.93 km^{2})
  - Water: 0.035 sq mi (0.09 km^{2})
- Elevation: 459 ft (140 m)

Population (2020)
  - Total: 568
  - Density: 762.5/sq mi (294.39/km^{2})
- Time zone: UTC-6 (CST)
  - Summer (DST): UTC-5 (CDT)
- ZIP code: 62460
- Area code: 618
- FIPS code: 17-66833
- GNIS feature ID: 2396489

St. Francisville or Saint Francisville is a city in Lawrence County, Illinois, United States. As of the 2020 census, St. Francisville had a population of 568.

== History ==
St. Francisville is rooted in a stockade built by Joseph Tougas in the early 1810s. The city was platted by Tougas's widow in the mid-1830s. It was named for St. Francis Xavier, reflecting the growing influence of Jesuit missionaries in the area. The city incorporated in 1873.

== Geography ==
St. Francisville is located in southeastern Lawrence County in the southeast corner of Denison Township. It is on the west bank of the Wabash River, which forms the state border with Indiana.

The city is 12 miles (19 km) south of Lawrenceville, the county seat. The Wabash Cannon Ball Bridge, 1.5 miles (2.4 km) northeast of St. Francisville, is a former railroad bridge that is now a one-lane toll bridge over the Wabash River which provides the most direct route to Vincennes, Indiana, 9 miles (14 km) to the northeast.

According to the 2021 census gazetteer files, St. Francisville has a total area of 0.78 square miles (2.02 km^{2}), of which 0.75 square miles (1.94 km^{2}) (or 95.64%) is land and 0.03 square miles (0.08 km^{2}) (or 4.36%) is water.

== Demographics ==
Historical population
| Census | Pop. | Note | %± |
|---|---|---|---|
| 1860 | 106 | | — |
| 1870 | 131 | | 23.6% |
| 1880 | 334 | | 155.0% |
| 1890 | 432 | | 29.3% |
| 1900 | 591 | | 36.8% |
| 1910 | 1,391 | | 135.4% |
| 1920 | 1,164 | | −16.3% |
| 1930 | 1,202 | | 3.3% |
| 1940 | 1,145 | | −4.7% |
| 1950 | 1,117 | | −2.4% |
| 1960 | 1,040 | | −6.9% |
| 1970 | 997 | | −4.1% |
| 1980 | 1,040 | | 4.3% |
| 1990 | 851 | | −18.2% |
| 2000 | 759 | | −10.8% |
| 2010 | 697 | | −8.2% |
| 2020 | 568 | | −18.5% |
U.S. Decennial Census

As of the 2020 census there were 568 people, 247 households, and 154 families residing in the city. The population density was 729.14 inhabitants per square mile (281.52/km^{2}). There were 274 housing units at an average density of 351.73 per square mile (135.80/km^{2}). The racial makeup of the city was 90.85% White, 0.00% African American, 0.88% Native American, 0.00% Asian, 0.18% Pacific Islander, 1.41% from other races, and 6.69% from two or more races. Hispanic or Latino of any race were 2.46% of the population.

There were 247 households, out of which 20.2% had children under the age of 18 living with them, 45.34% were married couples living together, 12.55% had a female householder with no husband present, and 37.65% were non-families. 31.98% of all households were made up of individuals, and 7.29% had someone living alone who was 65 years of age or older. The average household size was 2.37 and the average family size was 1.94.

The city's age distribution consisted of 18.3% under the age of 18, 5.8% from 18 to 24, 18.5% from 25 to 44, 32.9% from 45 to 64, and 24.4% who were 65 years of age or older. The median age was 52.5 years. For every 100 females, there were 109.6 males. For every 100 females age 18 and over, there were 114.2 males.

The median income for a household in the city was $42,917, and the median income for a family was $56,250. Males had a median income of $30,441 versus $23,611 for females. The per capita income for the city was $33,530. About 13.6% of families and 20.4% of the population were below the poverty line, including 45.5% of those under age 18 and 8.5% of those age 65 or over.

== Economy ==
St. Francisville is noted for a locally grown variety of popcorn, trademarked as "Black Jewell" for the color of the corn kernels. The popcorn packer attributes the varietal snack food to development work in the "mid 1960s."

== Notable people ==
- Julian Morgenstern (1881–1976), rabbi, professor, and president of Hebrew Union College
- William Phipps, retired actor and film producer
