= Chauncey, Illinois =

- Unincorporated community
- Location within Illinois Location within the United States
- Coordinates: 38°50′07″N 87°52′15″W
- Country: United States
- State: Illinois
- County: Lawrence
- Township: Petty
- Elevation: 489 ft (149 m)
- Time zone: UTC-6 (Central (CST))
  - Summer (DST): UTC-5 (CDT)
- Area code: 618
- GNIS feature ID: 405994

Chauncey is an unincorporated community in Lawrence County, Illinois, United States. Chauncey is 8 miles (13 km) north of Sumner.
