= Crawford County Airport =

Airport in Crawford County, Illinois, US

- IATA: none; ICAO: KRSV; FAA LID: RSV

Summary
- Airport type: Public
- Owner: Crawford County Airport Authority
- Serves: Robinson, Illinois
- Built: 1942
- In use: 1942-1945, 1951-
- Time zone: UTC−06:00 (-6)
  - Summer (DST): UTC−05:00 (-5)
- Elevation AMSL: 462 ft (141 m)
- Coordinates: 39°00′58″N 087°38′59″W

Map
- Location of airport in Illinois RSV (the United States)

Runways
Direction	Length		Surface
Direction	ft	m	Surface
9/27	5,108	1,557	Asphalt
17/35	3,398	1,036	Asphalt

Statistics (2021)
- Aircraft operations: 11,000
- Based aircraft: 17
- Source: Federal Aviation Administration

Crawford County Airport (ICAO: KRSV, FAA LID: RSV) is a public use airport located four nautical miles (4.6 mi; 7.4 km) east of the central business district of Robinson, a city in Crawford County, Illinois, United States. It is owned by the Crawford County Airport Authority and was formerly known as Robinson Municipal Airport. This airport is included in the National Plan of Integrated Airport Systems for 2011–2015, which categorized it as a general aviation facility.

Although many U.S. airports use the same three-letter location identifier for the FAA and IATA, this facility is assigned RSV by the FAA but has no designation from the IATA.

== History ==
The airport was built by the United States Army Air Forces during 1942/43 as an auxiliary airfield for George Army Airfield, near Lawrenceville, Illinois. It was known simply as George Army Airfield Auxiliary #4. The two runways in use today were built during that period.

The airport was used to help train medium bomber and transport pilots, who used it for emergencies or practiced touch-and-go landings. It was not staffed, and at the end of World War II, it was simply abandoned; the land turned over to local authorities, like many other small auxiliary airfields.

In June 1948, under the Surplus Property Act of 1947, the Army transferred the airport and its facilities to the city of Robinson to maintain airfield operations. The city managed the airfield until July 1961. In December 1959, a local referendum established the Robinson Community Airport Authority (RCAA). After the RCAA's incorporation in July 1961, the city handed over airport operations to the authority. The RCAA operated the airport from 1961 to 2007. In fall 2006, the Illinois State Legislature amended the Illinois Airport Authorities Act, dissolving the RCAA and transferring its responsibilities to the newly formed Crawford County Airport Authority (CCAA).

== Facilities and aircraft ==
Crawford County Airport covers an area of 432 acres (175 ha) at an elevation of 462 feet (141 m) above mean sea level. It has two asphalt paved runways: 9/27 is 5,108 by 100 feet (1,557 m × 30 m) and 17/35 is 3,398 by 75 feet (1,036 m × 23 m).

The airport has a fixed-base operator offering full- and self-serve fuel. Line services include cargo handling, detailing, deicing, and ground handling. A lounge, snooze rooms, a flight planning kiosk, and courtesy cars are also available.

For the 12-month period ending July 31, 2021, the airport recorded 11,300 aircraft operations, averaging 31 daily: 92% general aviation, 7% air taxi, and less than 1% military. At that time, 17 aircraft were based at the airport: 15 single-engine and 2 multi-engine airplanes. On March 31, 2023, an EF3 tornado struck KRSV, damaging most airport buildings. The airport has since been rebuilt with modern facilities, and the new terminal is set to open in fall 2025.

== Accidents and incidents ==
- On May 20, 1992, a Cessna 150 was destroyed while trying to land at Crawford County Airport in instrument meteorological conditions. The probable cause of the crash was found to be the pilot's decision to continue towards the airport in IMC.

== See also ==
- List of airports in Illinois
