= Bridgeport Township =

Bridgeport Township may refer to:

- Bridgeport Township, Lawrence County, Illinois
- Bridgeport Charter Township, Michigan
