= George Field, Illinois =

George Field
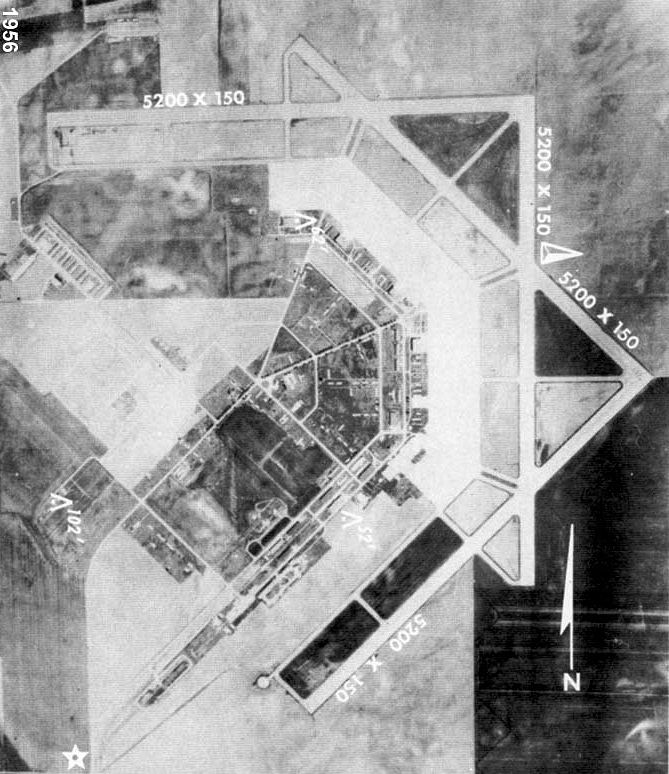
- George Field, Illinois, 1956
- IATA: none; ICAO: none

Summary
- Serves: Lawrenceville, Illinois
- Built: 1942
- In use: 1942-1945
- Coordinates: 38°45′51″N 87°36′20″W

Map
- George Field, Illinois

Runways
Direction	Length		Surface
Direction	ft	m	Surface
01/19	5,200	1,585	Asphalt
05/23	5,200	1,585	Asphalt
09/27	5,200	1,585	Asphalt
13/32	5,200	1,585	Asphalt

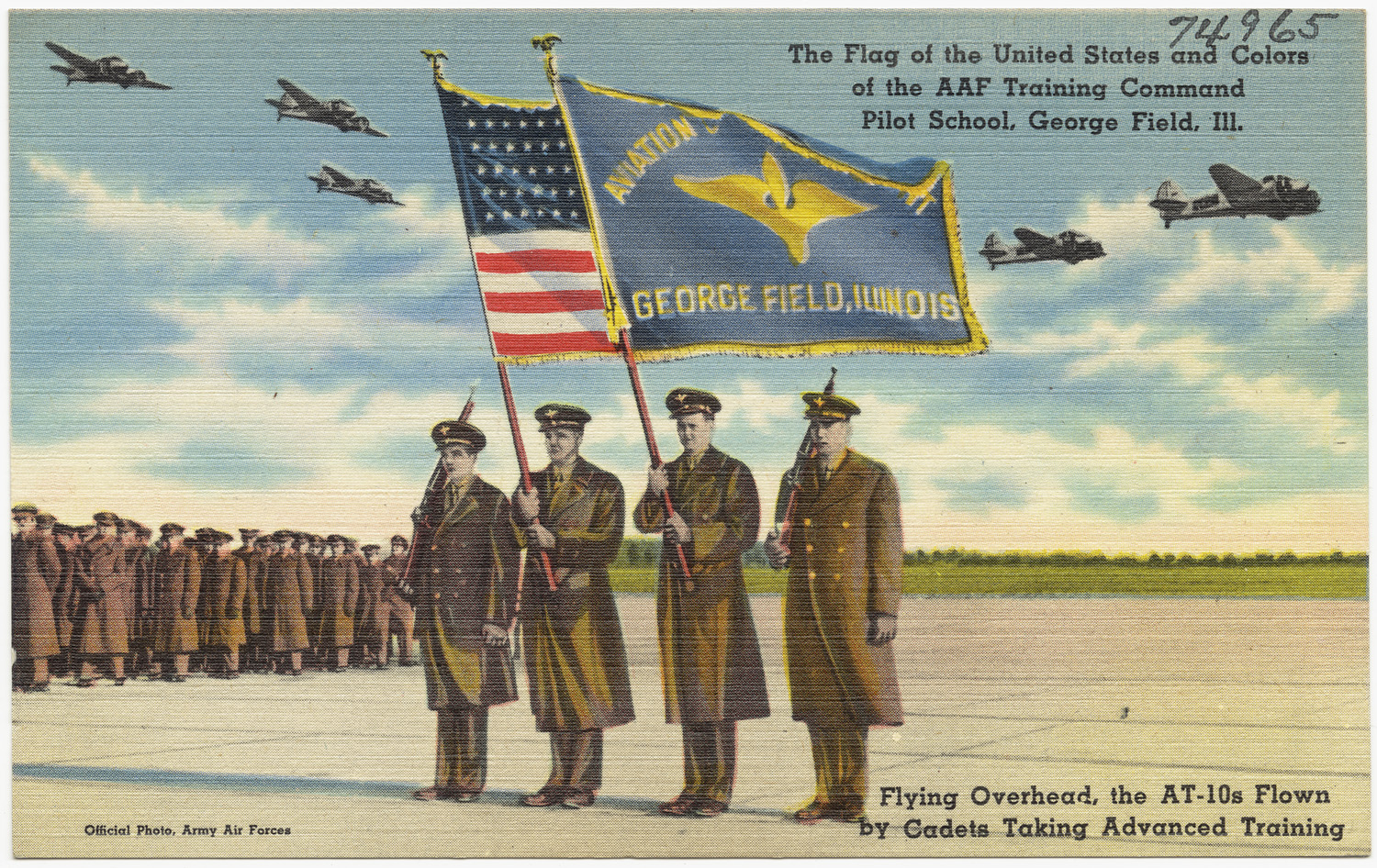
"The flag of the United States and colors of the AAF Training Command Pilot School, George Field, Ill, flying overhead, the AT-10s flown by cadets taking advanced training."

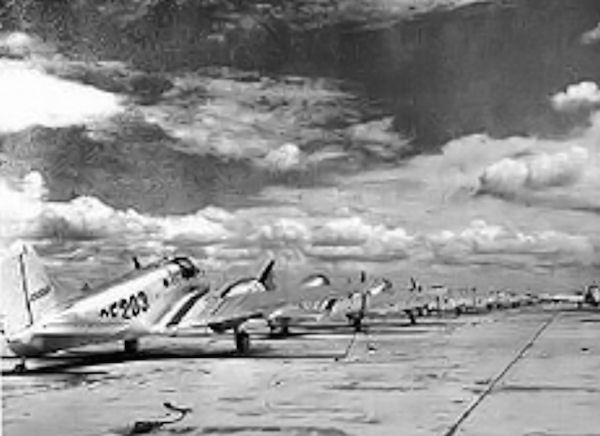
Beechcraft AT-10 Wichita trainers on the parking ramp at George Field, 1943

George Field is a former World War II military airfield, located 5 miles east-northeast of Lawrenceville, Illinois. It operated as an advanced pilot training school for the United States Army Air Forces from 1942 until 1945.

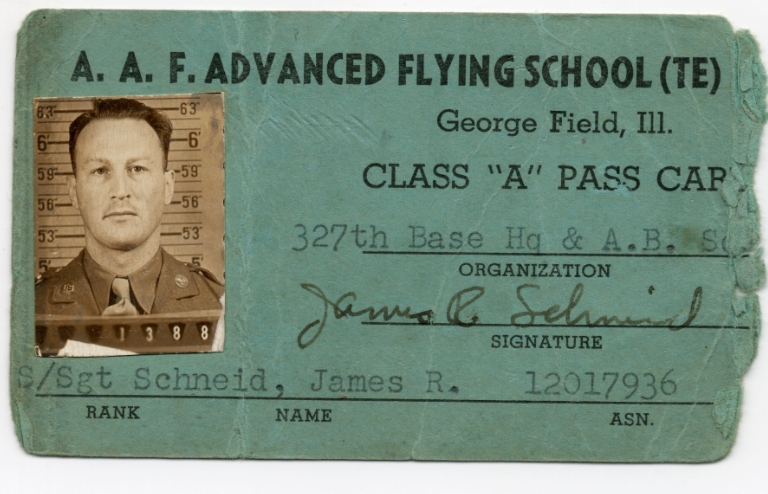
"George Field Class "A" Pass"

== History ==
George Field was authorized by the United States Army Air Corps in April 1942 as part of the expansion of pilot training bases by the Air Corps Flying Training Command as part of the 70,000 Pilot Training Program. It was one of many air fields created in the country's interior during the war. Construction of the facility began in June. The airfield consisted of four main 5,200 ft concrete and asphalt runways, aligned 01/19; 05/23; 09/27 and 13/31. In addition to the main airfield, four axillary fields were constructed to support the training mission. Those were located as follows

- George Field Auxiliary #1 (Presbyterian Field, Mount Carmel IL) 38°36′20″N 87°43′34″W
- George Field Auxiliary #2 (Emison Field, Vincennes, IN) 38°51′05″N 87°29′59″W
- George Field Auxiliary #3 (St. Thomas, IN) 38°36′12″N 87°33′44″W
- George Field Auxiliary#4 (Palestine, IL) 39°00′54″N 87°38′57″W

Additional airfields used by George Field for training were Atterbury Army Air Field, Indiana, and Sturgis Army Air Field, Kentucky, beginning in 1944 for combat troop carrier training.

George Field 1943 USAAF Classbook

Initially named “Lawrence Army Flying School”, the name was changed to honor General Harold H. George, who was killed in a ground accident at Batchelor Field, southeast of Darwin, Australia on 29 April 1942. He was killed when a Curtiss P-40 of the 49th Fighter Group lost directional control on takeoff and struck the parked Lockheed C-40 in which the General had just arrived at the base after escaping from the Philippines. General George had joined the Air Service, United States Army in 1917, and flew with the 139th Aero Squadron on the Western Front in France. In combat, he was credited with five aerial victories.

The school was opened on 10 August 1942 under the USAAF Eastern Flying Training Command, its mission to provide advanced (3d phase) pilot training in twin-engined aircraft. Training was conducted by the 30th Two Engine Flying Training Group using the Beechcraft AT-10 Wichita. Planes from George Field were fuselage-coded "GE".

Until the summer of 1944, George Field received cadets that had graduated from advanced flying training schools, primarily in the southeast and provided them upgrade training to twin engine aircraft. These pilots would go on to fly primarily medium bombers and transport planes after completing their training.

In late May 1943, severe flooding occurred in the Lawrence County area as a result of two weeks of almost ceaseless rain. George Field began to flood, causing the students and staff of the field to halt training and begin sandbagging the station area. It was impossible to get to either Lawrenceville or Vincennes, Indiana from the airfield except by boat when the levee broke on the Wabash River. Victory over the flood was celebrated at the Field with a holiday on 12 June.

By the summer of 1944, the need for C-47 Skytrain transport pilots was critical and Training Command transferred George Field to I Troop Carrier Command. The last Training Command class graduated on 4 August, and training activities were terminated on 15 August and jurisdiction was transferred. A change of mission was made and George Field was placed under the 805th Army Air Force Base Unit. Its training squadrons began training pilots for paratrooper drops and towing gliders. It also trained crews in combat re-supply and casualty evacuation procedures from rough forward airfields in the combat areas to hospitals in rear areas. In February 1945, training was changed from the C-47 to C-46 Commando transports.

With the end of World War II, training ended at George Field on 1 September 1945. and the field was placed on standby status. It was turned over to Air Technical Service Command (ATSC). ATSC's mission was to remove all usable military equipment from the property and dispose of items which no longer had a useful need. Like many other surplus airfields around the country, public sales were held to offer the material to the public. It was declared excess by the Army in 1946. George Field was conveyed though the War Assets Administration (WAA) to the City of Lawrenceville, Illinois on 16 November 1948 to establish a municipal airport.

== Current status ==
Today, the former training field is a general aviation airport, serving the local area. Three of the World War II runways remain in use as a main and as a crosswind runways. The massive parking apron remains, mostly unused, and sections of unused taxiways and runways remain, some partially removed for hardcore. The large station area is obliterated, with some of the wartime streets remaining as an airport access road and other agricultural roads; the buildings were long ago torn down or moved with a few concrete foundations remaining in the large grassy area. The military hangars on the flightline are gone, their concrete floors visible and exposed to the elements.

== See also ==
- Illinois World War II Army Airfields
- 30th Flying Training Wing (World War II)
