= Philip B. Benefiel =

American lawyer, judge, and politician (1923–2019)

Philip Baker Benefiel (June 25, 1923 – April 7, 2019) was an American lawyer, judge, and politician.

Benefiel was born in Lawrenceville, Illinois and went to the Lawrenceville public schools. He served in the United States Army during World War II in Europe. Benefiel received his bachelor's and law degrees from University of Illinois. He practiced law in Lawrenceville, Illinois. Benefiel served as the Illinois states attorney for Lawrence County, Illinois from 1948 to 1952 and was a Democrat. Benefiel served in the Illinois Senate from 1965 to 1966. He then served as an Illinois associate judge and then an Illinois circuit court judge from 1968 until 1991. Benefiel died at his home in Champaign, Illinois.
