= Denison Township =

Denison Township may refer to the following townships in the United States:

- Denison Township, Lawrence County, Illinois
- Denison Township, Crawford County, Iowa
