= Lyman W. Emmons =

American politician and businessman

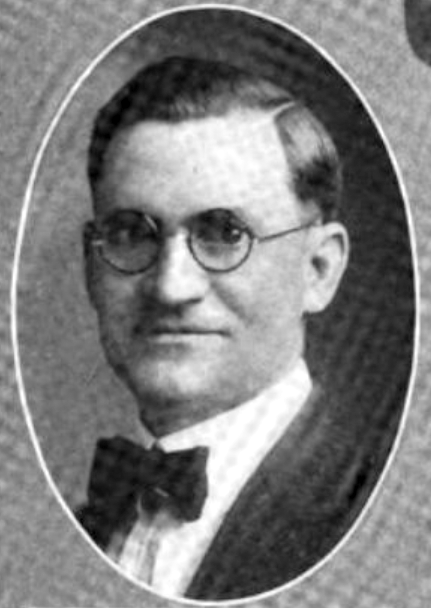

Member of the Illinois Senate
- In office 1924–1928

Member of the Illinois House of Representatives
- In office 1920–1924

Personal details
- Born: March 5, 1885 Lawrence County, Illinois
- Died: March 9, 1955 (aged 70) Pinkstaff, Illinois
- Party: Democratic
- Education: Vincennes University
- Occupation: Businessman, politician

Lyman W. Emmons (March 5, 1885 – March 9, 1955) was an American politician and businessman.

== Biography ==
Emmons was born on a farm in Lawrence County, Illinois and went to the public school in Lawrence County. Emmons attended Vincennes University in Vincennes, Indiana and to Central Normal College in Danville, Illinois. Emmons taught school in Lawrence County. In 107, Emmons graduated from Barnes School of Anatomy, Sanitary Science and Embalming in Chicago, Illinois. He was the owner of a funeral home in Lawrenceville, Illinois. Emmond served on the Lawrenceville Board of Education and was president of the board of education. He also served as President of the Lawrenceville Library Board. Emmons served in the Illinois House of Representatives from 1921 to 1925 and the Illinois Senate from 1925 to 1929. He was a Democrat. Emmons and a friend were killed by a train north of Pinkstaff, Illinois.
