= Black Cypress =

Black Cypress may refer to:

- Callitris endlicheri, an Australian tree commonly known as black cypress pine
- Black Cypress, one of three areas of Big Cypress Bayou in Jefferson, Texas
- Black Cypress (novel), a mystery novel by American writer Frances Crane
