= Senator Emmons =

Senator Emmons may refer to:

- Benjamin Emmons (1777–1843), Missouri State Senate
- Carlos Emmons (politician) (1799–1875), New York State Senate
- Joanne G. Emmons (1934–2022), Michigan State Senate
- Judy Emmons (fl. 2000s–2010s), Michigan State Senate
- Lyman W. Emmons (1885–1955), Illinois State Senate
