= Lukin Township, Lawrence County, Illinois =

Lukin Township
- Township

- Location of Illinois in the United States
- Coordinates: 38°36′59″N 87°49′33″W
- Country: United States
- State: Illinois
- County: Lawrence
- Settled: November 4, 1856

Area
  - Total: 49.51 sq mi (128.2 km^{2})
  - Land: 49.51 sq mi (128.2 km^{2})
  - Water: 0 sq mi (0 km^{2})
- Elevation: 466 ft (142 m)

Population (2020)
  - Total: 423
  - Density: 8.54/sq mi (3.30/km^{2})
- Time zone: UTC-6 (CST)
  - Summer (DST): UTC-5 (CDT)
- FIPS code: 17-101-45200

Lukin Township is located in Lawrence County, Illinois. As of the 2020 census, its population was 423 and it contained 160 housing units.

== Geography ==
According to the 2021 census gazetteer files, Lukin Township has a total area of 49.51 square miles (128.23 km^{2}), all land.

== Demographics ==
As of the 2020 census there were 423 people, 282 households, and 136 families residing in the township. The population density was 8.54 inhabitants per square mile (3.30/km^{2}). There were 160 housing units at an average density of 3.23 per square mile (1.25/km^{2}). The racial makeup of the township was 95.74% White, 0.24% African American, 0.24% Native American, 0.00% Asian, 0.00% Pacific Islander, 0.47% from other races, and 3.31% from two or more races. Hispanic or Latino of any race were 0.71% of the population.

There were 282 households, out of which 16.00% had children under the age of 18 living with them, 48.23% were married couples living together, 0.00% had a female householder with no spouse present, and 51.77% were non-families. 31.20% of all households were made up of individuals, and 28.00% had someone living alone who was 65 years of age or older. The average household size was 2.05 and the average family size was 2.79.

The township's age distribution consisted of 17.2% under the age of 18, 1.9% from 18 to 24, 22% from 25 to 44, 38.2% from 45 to 64, and 20.8% who were 65 years of age or older. The median age was 55.3 years. For every 100 females, there were 125.4 males. For every 100 females age 18 and over, there were 149.0 males.

The median income for a household in the township was $96,196, and the median income for a family was $107,734. Males had a median income of $76,776 versus $33,326 for females. The per capita income for the township was $41,228. About 7.4% of families and 3.3% of the population were below the poverty line..

Historical population
Census	Pop.	Note	%±
2010	429		—
2020	423		−1.4%
U.S. Decennial Census
