= The Turquoise Shop =

Book by Frances Crane

- First edition (publ. J. B. Lippincott)
- Author: Frances Crane
- Language: English
- Publisher: J. B. Lippincott
- Publication date: 1941
- LC Class: PZ3.C8515 Tu

The Turquoise Shop (1941) is a mystery novel by the American writer Frances Crane.

== Synopsis ==
Several months ago, Mona Brandon's artist husband disappeared, and his body has now surfaced deep in the heart of the nearby desert, pecked beyond recognition by a horde of odious turkey vultures. This event coincides with the mysterious arrival of Pat Abbott, a handsomely rugged private investigator from San Francisco with hopes of pursuing an art career, while the shallow and snobbish Mona finds herself ostracized by her small New Mexico community of Santa Maria, including Jean Holly, the owner of The Turquoise Shop, after she had her own beautiful teenager daughter incarcerated by police.

However, Mona soon becomes the focus of local attention when murder strikes again at her luxurious mansion home, and the various creative talents assembled there soon fall under suspicion.
