= The Indigo Necklace =

1945 mystery novel by Frances Crane

- First edition cover
- Author: Frances Crane
- Genre: Mystery
- Publisher: Random House
- Publication date: March 19, 1945

The Indigo Necklace (1945), also published as The Indigo Necklace Murders, is a mystery novel by American journalist Frances Crane.

== Synopsis ==
While staying in an old New Orleans mansion, Pat Abbott overhears the disquieting sound of opening doors and stolen footsteps across the balcony outside his room, before discovering the ghostly white, robed body of a man in the adjoining courtyard. Against his will, he finds himself up against a serial murderer with experience in exotic poisons, and whose master plan somehow involves the titular Indigo necklace.

== Publication details ==
- Crane, Frances (1945). The Indigo Necklace. New York: Random House.
