= Lawrence County Courthouse (Illinois) =

Local government building in the United States

- U.S. National Register of Historic Places
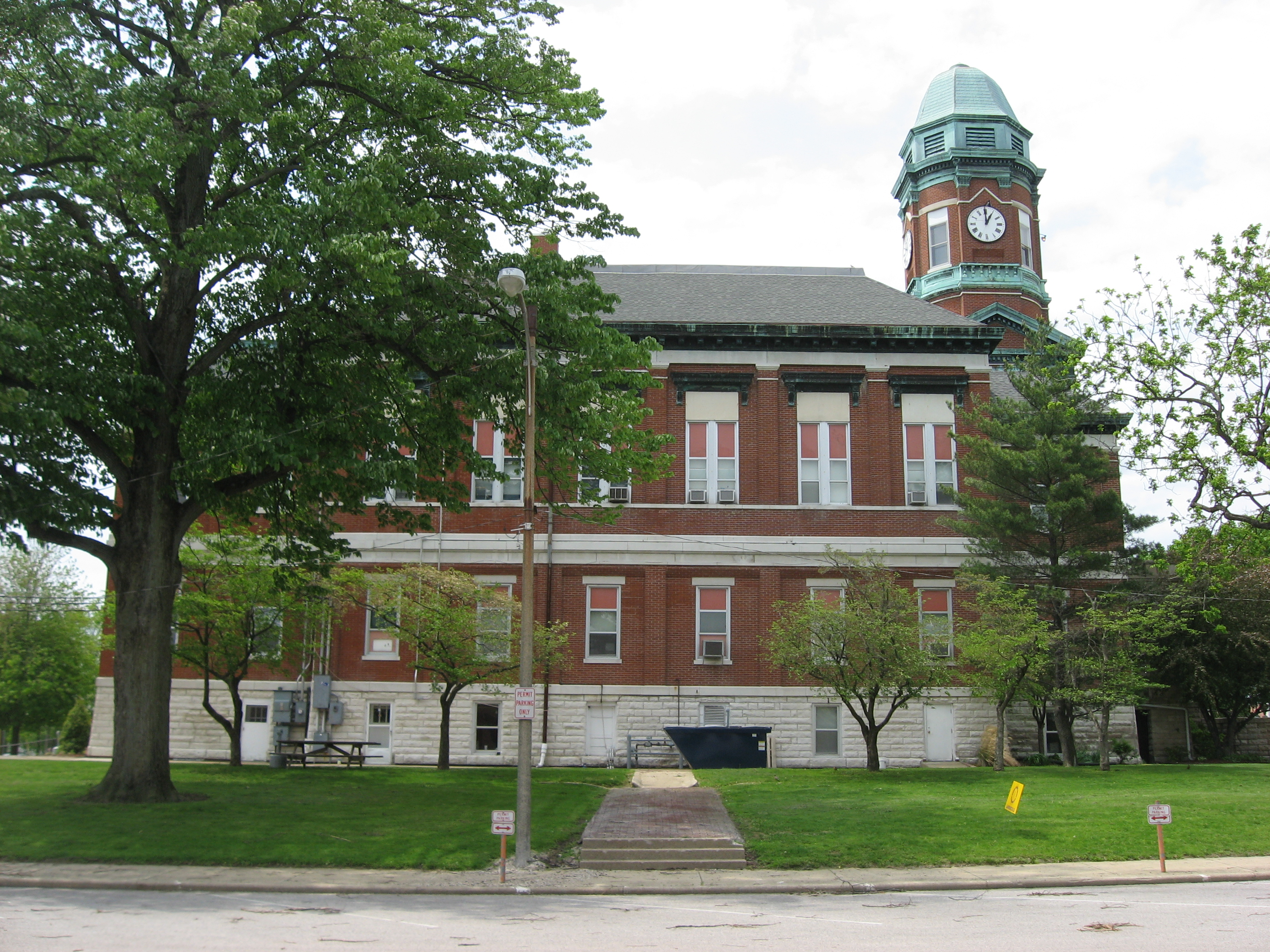

- Location within Illinois Location within the United States
- Interactive map showing the location of Lawrence County Courthouse
- Location: 1100 State St. Lawrenceville, Illinois
- Coordinates: 38°43′46″N 87°40′56″W
- Built: 1888-89
- Built by: Benjamin F. Trester, Jr.
- Architect: McDonald Bros.
- Architectural style: Renaissance Revival
- NRHP reference No.: 10000992
- Added to NRHP: December 7, 2010

The Lawrence County Courthouse, located at 1100 State St. in Lawrenceville, is the county courthouse serving Lawrence County, Illinois. Built in 1888–89, the courthouse is the third used by the county; all three courthouses were built at the same site in Lawrenceville's public square. The McDonald Brothers, an architectural firm from Louisville, Kentucky, designed the building in the Renaissance Revival style. The courthouse has a six-story clock tower with a clock and bell made by the Seth Thomas Clock Company; the tower is topped by an octagonal copper cupola. The main entrance to the courthouse, located below the clock tower on the building's north side, is surrounded by a stone portico supported by Tuscan columns and topped by a balcony. A copper cornice and limestone architrave encircle the top of the courthouse's main section; the second-story windows of this section have copper architraves, and a limestone belt course separates the two stories.

The courthouse was added to the National Register of Historic Places on December 7, 2010.
