= Lawrence Township, Lawrence County, Illinois =

Lawrence Township
- Township

- Location of Illinois in the United States
- Coordinates: 38°43′56″N 87°41′41″W
- Country: United States
- State: Illinois
- County: Lawrence
- Settled: November 4, 1856

Area
  - Total: 42.11 sq mi (109.1 km^{2})
  - Land: 41.90 sq mi (108.5 km^{2})
  - Water: 0.21 sq mi (0.54 km^{2}) 0.50%
- Elevation: 449 ft (137 m)

Population (2020)
  - Total: 6,171
  - Density: 147.3/sq mi (56.86/km^{2})
- Time zone: UTC-6 (CST)
  - Summer (DST): UTC-5 (CDT)
- FIPS code: 17-101-42379

Lawrence Township is located in Lawrence County, Illinois. As of the 2020 census, its population was 6,171 and it contained 2,964 housing units.

== Geography ==
According to the 2021 census gazetteer files, Lawrence Township has a total area of 42.11 square miles (109.06 km^{2}), of which 41.90 square miles (108.52 km^{2}) (or 99.50%) is land and 0.21 square miles (0.54 km^{2}) (or 0.50%) is water.

== Demographics ==
As of the 2020 census there were 6,171 people, 2,726 households, and 1,774 families residing in the township. The population density was 146.54 inhabitants per square mile (56.58/km^{2}). There were 2,964 housing units at an average density of 70.38 per square mile (27.17/km^{2}). The racial makeup of the township was 92.56% White, 1.26% African American, 0.13% Native American, 0.57% Asian, 0.05% Pacific Islander, 0.71% from other races, and 4.72% from two or more races. Hispanic or Latino of any race were 2.01% of the population.

There were 2,726 households, out of which 34.30% had children under the age of 18 living with them, 50.92% were married couples living together, 9.10% had a female householder with no spouse present, and 34.92% were non-families. 29.20% of all households were made up of individuals, and 14.30% had someone living alone who was 65 years of age or older. The average household size was 2.25 and the average family size was 2.71.

The township's age distribution consisted of 20.8% under the age of 18, 7.3% from 18 to 24, 25.3% from 25 to 44, 24.8% from 45 to 64, and 21.9% who were 65 years of age or older. The median age was 42.9 years. For every 100 females, there were 94.1 males. For every 100 females age 18 and over, there were 94.9 males.

The median income for a household in the township was $45,556, and the median income for a family was $55,833. Males had a median income of $37,161 versus $26,750 for females. The per capita income for the township was $26,226. About 11.6% of families and 16.5% of the population were below the poverty line, including 24.9% of those under age 18 and 5.9% of those age 65 or over.

Historical population
| Census | Pop. | Note | %± |
|---|---|---|---|
| 2010 | 6,521 | | — |
| 2020 | 6,171 | | −5.4% |
U.S. Decennial Census
