= Birds, Illinois =

- Unincorporated community
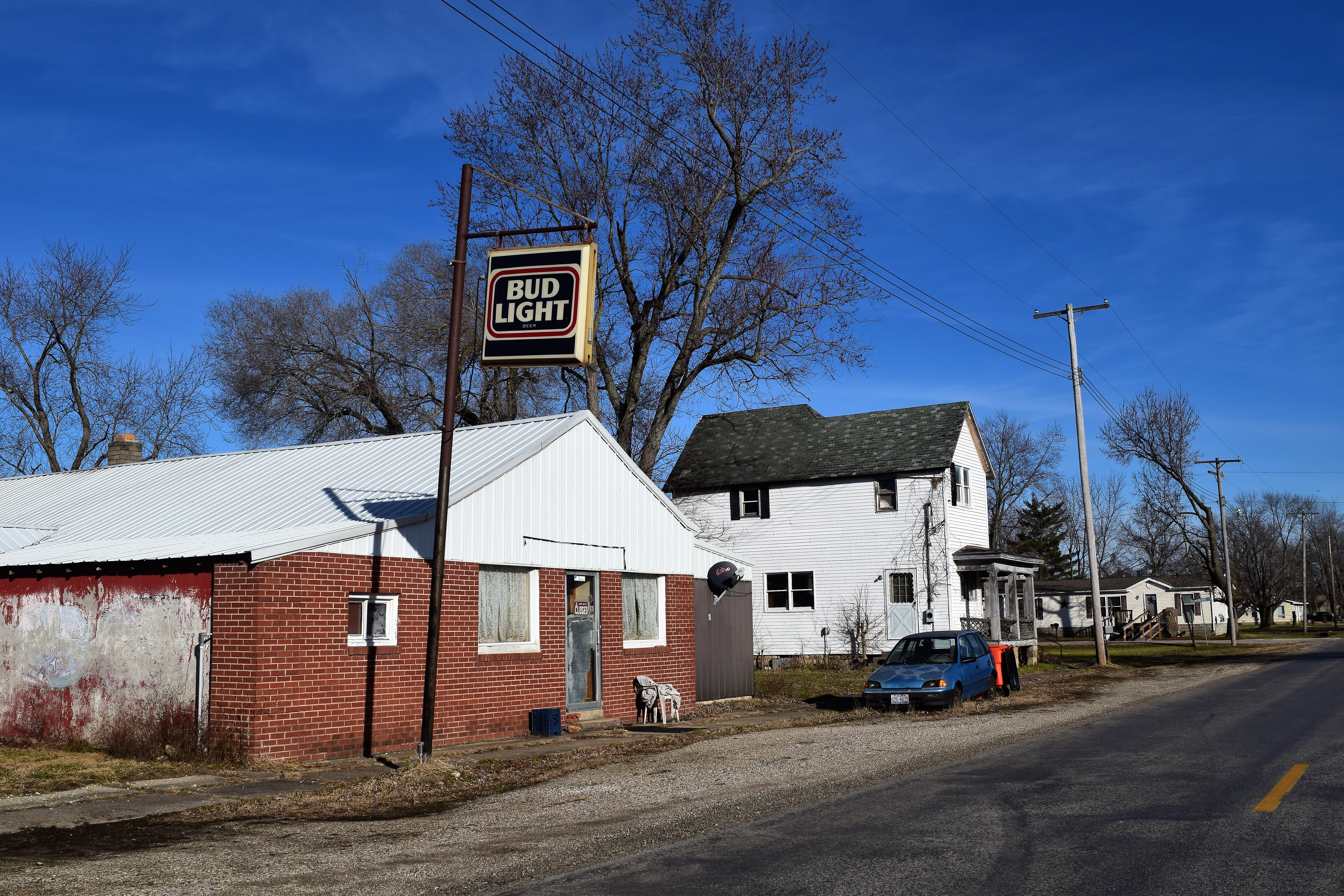
- A bar in Birds

- Location in Illinois Location in the United States
- Coordinates: 38°50′15″N 87°40′12″W
- Country: United States
- State: Illinois
- County: Lawrence
- Township: Bond

Area
  - Total: 0.2 sq mi (0.52 km^{2})
  - Land: 0.2 sq mi (0.52 km^{2})
- Elevation: 436 ft (133 m)

Population (2000)
  - Total: 51
  - Density: 250/sq mi (98/km^{2})
- Time zone: UTC-6 (CST)
  - Summer (DST): UTC-5 (CDT)
- Postal code: 62415
- Area code: 618
- GNIS feature ID: 2628543

Birds is an unincorporated community in Lawrence County, Illinois, United States. The population was 51 at the 2000 census, at which time it was a village. Birds disincorporated on April 7, 2009.

== Geography ==
According to the United States Census Bureau, the village had a total area of 0.2 square miles (0.52 km^{2}), all land.

== Demographics ==
As of the census of 2000, there were 51 people, 22 households, and 13 families residing in the village. The population density was 235.6 inhabitants per square mile (91.0/km^{2}). There were 30 housing units at an average density of 101.6 per square mile (39.2/km^{2}). The racial makeup of the village was 100.00% White. Hispanic or Latino of any race were 1.96% of the population.

There were 22 households, out of which 36.4% had children under the age of 18 living with them, 27.3% were married couples living together, 22.7% had a female householder with no husband present, and 40.9% were non-families. 27.3% of all households were made up of individuals, and 13.6% had someone living alone who was 65 years of age or older. The average household size was 2.32 and the average family size was 2.77.

In the village the population was spread out, with 23.5% under the age of 18, 17.6% from 18 to 24, 21.6% from 25 to 44, 29.4% from 45 to 64, and 7.8% who were 65 years of age or older. The median age was 37 years. For every 100 females, there were 82.1 males. For every 100 females age 18 and over, there were 85.7 males.

The median income for a household in the village was $23,438, and the median income for a family was $25,417. Males had a median income of $20,833 versus $10,000 for females. The per capita income for the village was $9,216. There were 33.3% of families and 20.0% of the population living below the poverty line, including 29.4% of under eighteens and none of those over 64.
