= Christy Township, Lawrence County, Illinois =

Christy Township
- Township

- Location of Illinois in the United States
- Coordinates: 38°41′55″N 87°51′35″W
- Country: United States
- State: Illinois
- County: Lawrence
- Settled: November 4, 1856

Area
  - Total: 33.84 sq mi (87.6 km^{2})
  - Land: 33.78 sq mi (87.5 km^{2})
  - Water: 0.06 sq mi (0.16 km^{2}) 0.18%
- Elevation: 469 ft (143 m)

Population (2020)
  - Total: 3,120
  - Density: 92.4/sq mi (35.7/km^{2})
- Time zone: UTC-6 (CST)
  - Summer (DST): UTC-5 (CDT)
- FIPS code: 17-101-14299

Christy Township is located in Lawrence County, Illinois. As of the 2020 census, its population was 3,120 and it contained 564 housing units.

== Geography ==
According to the 2021 census gazetteer files, Christy Township has a total area of 33.84 square miles (87.65 km^{2}), of which 33.78 square miles (87.49 km^{2}) (or 99.82%) is land and 0.06 square miles (0.16 km^{2}) (or 0.18%) is water.

== Demographics ==
As of the 2020 census there were 3,120 people, 606 households, and 398 families residing in the township. The population density was 92.19 inhabitants per square mile (35.59/km^{2}). There were 564 housing units at an average density of 16.67 per square mile (6.44/km^{2}). The racial makeup of the township was 48.37% White, 41.03% African American, 0.00% Native American, 0.42% Asian, 0.00% Pacific Islander, 9.01% from other races, and 1.19% from two or more races. Hispanic or Latino of any race were 10.06% of the population.

There were 606 households, out of which 34.30% had children under the age of 18 living with them, 52.48% were married couples living together, 10.56% had a female householder with no spouse present, and 34.32% were non-families. 29.40% of all households were made up of individuals, and 12.40% had someone living alone who was 65 years of age or older. The average household size was 2.32 and the average family size was 2.84.

The township's age distribution consisted of 10.2% under the age of 18, 14.1% from 18 to 24, 41.9% from 25 to 44, 25.7% from 45 to 64, and 8.1% who were 65 years of age or older. The median age was 34.5 years. For every 100 females, there were 342.9 males. For every 100 females age 18 and over, there were 466.3 males.

The median income for a household in the township was $52,500, and the median income for a family was $71,071. Males had a median income of $37,679 versus $21,891 for females. The per capita income for the township was $11,402. About 15.8% of families and 15.6% of the population were below the poverty line, including 21.0% of those under age 18 and 8.4% of those age 65 or over.

Historical population
| Census | Pop. | Note | %± |
|---|---|---|---|
| 2010 | 3,774 | | — |
| 2020 | 3,120 | | −17.3% |
U.S. Decennial Census
