= Pinkstaff, Illinois =

- Unincorporated community
- Location within Illinois Location within the United States
- Coordinates: 38°47′40″N 87°40′09″W
- Country: United States
- State: Illinois
- County: Lawrence
- Township: Bond
- Elevation: 440 ft (130 m)
- Time zone: UTC-6 (Central (CST))
  - Summer (DST): UTC-5 (CDT)
- Postal code: 62439
- Area code: 618
- GNIS feature ID: 415719

Pinkstaff is an unincorporated community in Lawrence County, Illinois, United States. Pinkstaff is 4.5 miles (7.2 km) north of Lawrenceville.
