= Russell Township, Lawrence County, Illinois =

Russell Township
- Township

- Location of Illinois in the United States
- Coordinates: 38°48′N 87°34′W
- Country: United States
- State: Illinois
- County: Lawrence
- Settled: November 4, 1856

Area
  - Total: 36.25 sq mi (93.9 km^{2})
  - Land: 35.88 sq mi (92.9 km^{2})
  - Water: 0.37 sq mi (0.96 km^{2}) 1.02%
- Elevation: 420 ft (130 m)

Population (2020)
  - Total: 397
  - Density: 11.1/sq mi (4.27/km^{2})
- Time zone: UTC-6 (CST)
  - Summer (DST): UTC-5 (CDT)
- FIPS code: 17-101-66378

Russell Township is located in Lawrence County, Illinois. As of the 2020 census, its population was 397 and it contained 199 housing units. The township includes the village of Russellville on the Wabash River.

== Geography ==
According to the 2021 census gazetteer files, Russell Township has a total area of 36.25 square miles (93.89 km^{2}), of which 35.88 square miles (92.93 km^{2}) (or 98.98%) is land and 0.37 square miles (0.96 km^{2}) (or 1.02%) is water.

== Demographics ==
As of the 2020 census there were 397 people, 143 households, and 48 families residing in the township. The population density was 10.95 inhabitants per square mile (4.23/km^{2}). There were 199 housing units at an average density of 5.49 per square mile (2.12/km^{2}). The racial makeup of the township was 95.21% White, 0.76% African American, 0.00% Native American, 0.76% Asian, 0.00% Pacific Islander, 0.50% from other races, and 2.77% from two or more races. Hispanic or Latino of any race were 1.26% of the population.

There were 143 households, out of which 17.50% had children under the age of 18 living with them, 30.07% were married couples living together, 3.50% had a female householder with no spouse present, and 66.43% were non-families. 51.70% of all households were made up of individuals, and 23.80% had someone living alone who was 65 years of age or older. The average household size was 1.74 and the average family size was 2.48.

The township's age distribution consisted of 12.0% under the age of 18, 4.4% from 18 to 24, 11.2% from 25 to 44, 52.6% from 45 to 64, and 19.7% who were 65 years of age or older. The median age was 51.8 years. For every 100 females, there were 57.6 males. For every 100 females age 18 and over, there were 62.2 males.

The median income for a household in the township was $75,568, and the median income for a family was $85,000. Males had a median income of $75,375 versus $41,172 for females. The per capita income for the township was $61,565. About 0.0% of families and 12.0% of the population were below the poverty line, including none of those under age 18 and 4.1% of those age 65 or over.

Historical population
| Census | Pop. | Note | %± |
|---|---|---|---|
| 2010 | 450 | | — |
| 2020 | 397 | | −11.8% |
U.S. Decennial Census
