= Russellville, Illinois =

- Village
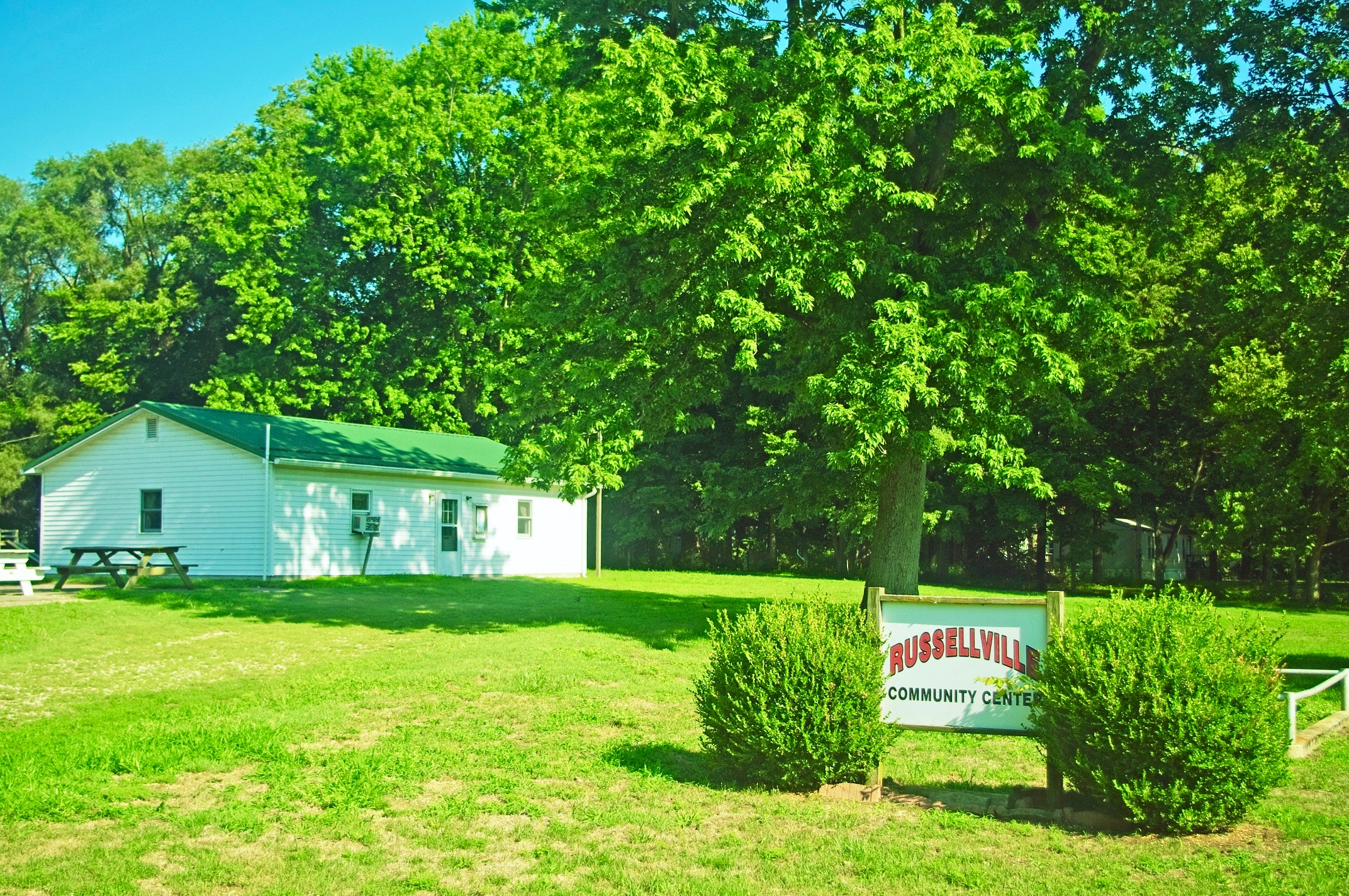
- Russellville Community Center

- Location in Lawrence County, Illinois
- Coordinates: 38°49′08″N 87°31′48″W
- Country: United States
- State: Illinois
- County: Lawrence
- Township: Russell

Area
  - Total: 0.41 sq mi (1.06 km^{2})
  - Land: 0.40 sq mi (1.03 km^{2})
  - Water: 0.0077 sq mi (0.02 km^{2})
- Elevation: 427 ft (130 m)

Population (2020)
  - Total: 98
  - Density: 245.3/sq mi (94.71/km^{2})
- Time zone: UTC-6 (CST)
  - Summer (DST): UTC-5 (CDT)
- ZIP code: 62439
- Area code: 618
- FIPS code: 17-66404
- GNIS feature ID: 2399148

Russellville is a village in Lawrence County, Illinois, United States. As of the 2020 census, Russellville had a population of 98.

== History ==
Russellville is rooted in a fort built by Samuel and Jonathan Allison near the site of an abandoned Indian village known as "Little Village" in the early 1800s. A town site was platted in 1835, and named for the Russell brothers, August, Andrew, and Clement, who provided lumber for the settlement's first buildings. Russellville incorporated in 1875.

== Geography ==
Russellville is located in northeastern Lawrence County on the west bank of the Wabash River, which forms the Illinois–Indiana border. Illinois Route 33 passes through the village center, leading north 14 miles (23 km) to Palestine and south 10 miles (16 km) to Westport, across the river from Vincennes, Indiana.

According to the 2021 census gazetteer files, Russellville has a total area of 0.41 square miles (1.06 km^{2}), of which 0.40 square miles (1.04 km^{2}) (or 97.80%) is land and 0.01 square miles (0.03 km^{2}) (or 2.20%) is water.

== Demographics ==
Historical population
Census	Pop.	Note	%±
1870	311		—
1880	265		−14.8%
1890	284		7.2%
1900	253		−10.9%
1910	257		1.6%
1920	200		−22.2%
1930	205		2.5%
1940	224		9.3%
1950	207		−7.6%
1960	197		−4.8%
1970	174		−11.7%
1980	171		−1.7%
1990	133		−22.2%
2000	119		−10.5%
2010	94		−21.0%
2020	98		4.3%
U.S. Decennial Census

As of the 2020 census there were 98 people, 54 households, and 12 families residing in the village. The population density was 239.61 inhabitants per square mile (92.51/km^{2}). There were 57 housing units at an average density of 139.36 per square mile (53.81/km^{2}). The racial makeup of the village was 89.80% White, 0.00% African American, 0.00% Native American, 0.00% Asian, 0.00% Pacific Islander, 1.02% from other races, and 9.18% from two or more races. Hispanic or Latino of any race were 2.04% of the population.

There were 54 households, out of which 9.3% had children under the age of 18 living with them, 18.52% were married couples living together, 3.70% had a female householder with no husband present, and 77.78% were non-families. 77.78% of all households were made up of individuals, and 37.04% had someone living alone who was 65 years of age or older. The average household size was 2.50 and the average family size was 1.39.

The village's age distribution consisted of 13.3% under the age of 18, 1.3% from 18 to 24, 33.4% from 25 to 44, 14.7% from 45 to 64, and 37.3% who were 65 years of age or older. The median age was 50.8 years. For every 100 females, there were 82.9 males. For every 100 females age 18 and over, there were 85.7 males.

The median income for a household in the village was $27,143, and the median income for a family was $57,500. Males had a median income of $48,125 versus $22,500 for females. The per capita income for the village was $25,753. No families and 17.3% of the population were below the poverty line, including none of those under age 18 and 7.1% of those age 65 or over.
