= Bond Township, Lawrence County, Illinois =

Bond Township
- Township

- Location of Illinois in the United States
- Coordinates: 38°48′56″N 87°41′46″W
- Country: United States
- State: Illinois
- County: Lawrence
- Settled: November 4, 1856

Area
  - Total: 35.39 sq mi (91.7 km^{2})
  - Land: 35.39 sq mi (91.7 km^{2})
  - Water: 0 sq mi (0 km^{2}) 0%
- Elevation: 476 ft (145 m)

Population (2020)
  - Total: 560
  - Density: 16/sq mi (6.1/km^{2})
- Time zone: UTC-6 (CST)
  - Summer (DST): UTC-5 (CDT)
- FIPS code: 17-101-07198

Bond Township is located in Lawrence County, Illinois. Largely rural, it includes only the hamlets of Birds and Pinkstaff. As of the 2020 census, its population was 560 and it contained 278 housing units.

== Geography ==
According to the 2021 census gazetteer files, Bond Township has a total area of 35.39 square miles (91.66 km^{2}), all land.

== Demographics ==
As of the 2020 census there were 560 people, 338 households, and 202 families residing in the township. The population density was 15.82 inhabitants per square mile (6.11/km^{2}). There were 278 housing units at an average density of 7.86 per square mile (3.03/km^{2}). The racial makeup of the township was 93.75% White, 1.43% African American, 0.00% Native American, 0.36% Asian, 0.18% Pacific Islander, 0.54% from other races, and 3.75% from two or more races. Hispanic or Latino of any race were 1.25% of the population.

There were 338 households, out of which 37.60% had children under the age of 18 living with them, 42.60% were married couples living together, 17.16% had a female householder with no spouse present, and 40.24% were non-families. 40.20% of all households were made up of individuals, and 21.90% had someone living alone who was 65 years of age or older. The average household size was 2.24 and the average family size was 2.88.

The township's age distribution consisted of 23.9% under the age of 18, 11.7% from 18 to 24, 31.9% from 25 to 44, 20.4% from 45 to 64, and 12.1% who were 65 years of age or older. The median age was 35.3 years. For every 100 females, there were 92.4 males. For every 100 females age 18 and over, there were 69.7 males.

Males had a median income of $107,614 versus $12,429 for females. The per capita income for the township was $33,585. About 29.7% of families and 26.9% of the population were below the poverty line, including 52.6% of those under age 18 and 0.0% of those age 65 or over.

Historical population
Census	Pop.	Note	%±
2010	685		—
2020	560		−18.2%
U.S. Decennial Census
