= Allison Township, Lawrence County, Illinois =

Allison
- Township
- Location of Allison Township in Lawrence County

- Location of Allison Township in Illinois
- Coordinates: 38°43′01″N 87°34′54″W
- Country: United States
- State: Illinois
- County: Lawrence
- Settled: November 4, 1856

Area
  - Total: 45.33 sq mi (117.4 km^{2})
  - Land: 44.53 sq mi (115.3 km^{2})
  - Water: 0.8 sq mi (2.1 km^{2}) 1.76%
- Elevation: 404 ft (123 m)

Population (2020)
  - Total: 278
  - Density: 6.24/sq mi (2.41/km^{2})
- Time zone: UTC-6 (CST)
  - Summer (DST): UTC-5 (CDT)
- FIPS code: 17-101-00906

Allison Township is located in Lawrence County, Illinois. As of the 2020 census, its population was 278 and it contained 153 housing units.

Allison Township derives its name from Allison's Prairie, which was settled by the Allison family in the 1810s.

== Geography ==
According to the 2021 census gazetteer files, Allison Township has a total area of 45.33 square miles (117.40 km^{2}), of which 44.53 square miles (115.33 km^{2}) (or 98.24%) is land and 0.80 square miles (2.07 km^{2}) (or 1.76%) is water.

== Demographics ==
As of the 2020 census there were 278 people, 130 households, and 53 families residing in the township. The population density was 6.13 inhabitants per square mile (2.37/km^{2}). There were 153 housing units at an average density of 3.38 per square mile (1.31/km^{2}). The racial makeup of the township was 93.17% White, 0.72% African American, 0.00% Native American, 0.36% Asian, 0.00% Pacific Islander, 0.00% from other races, and 5.76% from two or more races. Hispanic or Latino of any race were 0.72% of the population.

There were 130 households, out of which 16.90% had children under the age of 18 living with them, 40.77% were married couples living together, 0.00% had a female householder with no spouse present, and 59.23% were non-families. 59.20% of all households were made up of individuals, and 59.20% had someone living alone who was 65 years of age or older. The average household size was 1.95 and the average family size was 3.32.

The township's age distribution consisted of 22.5% under the age of 18, 4.0% from 18 to 24, 18.9% from 25 to 44, 24.2% from 45 to 64, and 30.4% who were 65 years of age or older. The median age was 56.8 years. For every 100 females, there were 57.1 males. For every 100 females age 18 and over, there were 59.3 males.

The median income for a family was $49,886. Males had a median income of $43,542. The per capita income for the township was $62,495. None of the population was below the poverty line.

Historical population
Census	Pop.	Note	%±
2010	267		—
2020	278		4.1%
U.S. Decennial Census
