= Bridgeport Township, Lawrence County, Illinois =

Bridgeport Township
- Township

- Location of Illinois in the United States
- Coordinates: 38°42′04″N 87°46′48″W
- Country: United States
- State: Illinois
- County: Lawrence
- Settled: September 10, 1872

Area
  - Total: 15.96 sq mi (41.3 km^{2})
  - Land: 15.94 sq mi (41.3 km^{2})
  - Water: 0.03 sq mi (0.078 km^{2}) 0.16%
- Elevation: 456 ft (139 m)

Population (2020)
  - Total: 2,331
  - Density: 146.2/sq mi (56.46/km^{2})
- Time zone: UTC-6 (CST)
  - Summer (DST): UTC-5 (CDT)
- FIPS code: 17-101-08199

Bridgeport Township is located in Lawrence County, Illinois. As of the 2020 census, its population was 2,331 and it contained 1,033 housing units.

== Geography ==
According to the 2021 census gazetteer files, Bridgeport Township has a total area of 15.96 square miles (41.34 km^{2}), of which 15.94 square miles (41.28 km^{2}) (or 99.84%) is land and 0.03 square miles (0.08 km^{2}) (or 0.16%) is water.

== Demographics ==
As of the 2020 census there were 2,331 people, 1,051 households, and 622 families residing in the township. The population density was 146.04 inhabitants per square mile (56.39/km^{2}). There were 1,033 housing units at an average density of 64.72 per square mile (24.99/km^{2}). The racial makeup of the township was 94.38% White, 1.33% African American, 0.04% Native American, 0.13% Asian, 0.09% Pacific Islander, 0.73% from other races, and 3.30% from two or more races. Hispanic or Latino of any race were 1.24% of the population.

There were 1,051 households, out of which 32.30% had children under the age of 18 living with them, 38.73% were married couples living together, 16.65% had a female householder with no spouse present, and 40.82% were non-families. 15.60% of all households were made up of individuals, and 7.80% had someone living alone who was 65 years of age or older. The average household size was 2.24 and the average family size was 2.93.

The township's age distribution consisted of 29.6% under the age of 18, 6.4% from 18 to 24, 21.2% from 25 to 44, 30.9% from 45 to 64, and 11.8% who were 65 years of age or older. The median age was 38.1 years. For every 100 females, there were 121.6 males. For every 100 females age 18 and over, there were 115.3 males.

The median income for a household in the township was $58,435, and the median income for a family was $54,015. Males had a median income of $50,742 versus $31,595 for females. The per capita income for the township was $29,597. About 7.9% of families and 7.6% of the population were below the poverty line, including 7.6% of those under age 18 and 6.1% of those age 65 or over.

Historical population
Census	Pop.	Note	%±
2010	2,420		—
2020	2,331		−3.7%
U.S. Decennial Census
