= Frances Crane =

American journalist

Popular Library edition with cover illustration by Rudolph Belarski

Frances Kirkwood Crane (October 27, 1890 – November 6, 1981) was an American mystery author, who introduced private investigator Pat Abbott and his future wife Jean in her first novel, The Turquoise Shop (1941). The Abbotts investigated crimes in a total of 26 volumes, each with a color in the title.

== Life and career ==
The daughter of Mr. and Mrs. R. M. Kirkwood, Crane was born in Lawrenceville, Illinois, and hailed from a wealthy, well-educated family; most of her male relatives were doctors, and her aunt Nancy may have earned a master's degree, highly unusual for a woman of that time. Some biographies mistakenly list her birth year as 1896. Crane herself graduated from Lawrenceville High School and was a Phi Beta Kappa graduate of the University of Illinois, and she did graduate study at the University of Chicago. She had a brother.

Her husband was the wealthy advertising executive Ned Crane, and throughout their marriage Frances regularly published articles in The New Yorker, where she became known for her dry, sophisticated sense of humour. She spent an extended stay in Germany towards the end of the 1930s, but her liberal opinions and outspokenness soon put her at odds with the rising tide of Nazism; she was once reprimanded after thumbing her nose at a speech by Hitler being broadcast over loudspeakers, and on another occasion tried convincing the staff at an anti-Semitic restaurant that she was Jewish (her family were in fact descended from Scottish Presbyterians). She was expelled from Germany following the arrest of her Jewish housekeeper and the woman's son, supposedly for 'crimes against the state', and Frances's subsequent furious articles decrying the Nazi regime.

After leaving behind Nazi Germany, having been recently divorced and faced with mounting college bills from her only daughter, Nancy, Frances began formulating detective stories, upon realising that her old fiction – gentle satires of English culture – were going out of fashion among modern American readers, who were now supporting the British in World War II. Nancy herself was a sculptor and also wrote articles of her own in the late 1940s; she was married to the pulp magazine writer Norbert Davis until his suicide, possibly as a result of his cancer diagnosis, and had one daughter, Diana Farris. Frances published no novels in 1949 because of Nancy's near fatal car accident; she crashed the same vehicle her husband gassed himself in, and was left facially mutilated for several months afterwards. Amazingly she had another child, Cynthia, soon after the incident.

Crane's first novel was The Tennessee Poppy, published in 1932.

Art by Rudolph Belarski

Frances published her first crime novel, The Turquoise Shop, in 1941, after hearing about a real-life incident in a jeweller's shop, and subsequently produced 25 more mystery novels, taking early retirement by 1968. She died in an Albuquerque, New Mexico nursing home, where she had spent the previous few months because of ill-health. Her ashes were scattered across her home town of Lawrenceville.

== Radio ==
From 1945 to 1947, the radio series, Abbott Mysteries, was based on Crane's characters. Between 1954 and 1955, the radio program Adventures of the Abbotts starred Claudia Morgan and Don Briggs (followed by Les Damon and Mandel Kramer) as the husband-and-wife crimefighters.

== Bibliography ==
=== Pat and Jean Abbott novels ===
- The Turquoise Shop – 1941
- The Golden Box – 1942
- The Yellow Violet – 1942
- The Applegreen Cat – 1943
- The Pink Umbrella – 1943 (aka The Pink Umbrella Murder)
- The Amethyst Spectacles – 1944
- The Indigo Necklace – 1945 (aka The Indigo Necklace Murders)
- The Cinnamon Murder – 1946
- The Shocking Pink Hat – 1946
- Murder on the Purple Water – 1947
- Black Cypress – 1948
- The Flying Red Horse – 1949
- The Daffodil Blonde – 1950
- Murder in Blue Street – 1951 (aka Death in the Blue Hour)
- The Polkadot Murder – 1951
- 13 White Tulips – 1953
- Murder in Bright Red – 1953
- The Coral Princess Murders – 1954
- Death in Lilac Time – 1955
- Horror on the Ruby X – 1956
- The Ultraviolet Widow – 1956
- The Man in Gray – 1958 (aka The Gray Stranger)
- The Buttercup Case – 1958
- Death-Wish Green – 1960
- The Amber Eyes – 1962
- Body Beneath A Mandarin Tree – 1965

=== Non-Abbott novels ===

- The Reluctant Sleuth – 1961
- Three Days in Hong Kong – 1965
- A Very Quiet Murder – 1966
- Worse Than a Crime – 1968

== Listen to ==
- Adventures of the Abbotts
