= Petty Township, Lawrence County, Illinois =

Petty Township
- Township

- Location of Illinois in the United States
- Coordinates: 38°47′30″N 87°50′00″W
- Country: United States
- State: Illinois
- County: Lawrence
- Settled: November 4, 1856

Area
  - Total: 57.36 sq mi (148.6 km^{2})
  - Land: 57.34 sq mi (148.5 km^{2})
  - Water: 0.02 sq mi (0.052 km^{2}) 0.04%
- Elevation: 469 ft (143 m)

Population (2020)
  - Total: 656
  - Density: 11.4/sq mi (4.42/km^{2})
- Time zone: UTC-6 (CST)
  - Summer (DST): UTC-5 (CDT)
- FIPS code: 17-101-59377

Petty Township is located in Lawrence County, Illinois. As of the 2020 census, its population was 656 and it contained 285 housing units.

== Geography ==
According to the 2021 census gazetteer files, Petty Township has a total area of 57.36 square miles (148.56 km^{2}), of which 57.34 square miles (148.51 km^{2}) (or 99.96%) is land and 0.02 square miles (0.05 km^{2}) (or 0.04%) is water.

== Demographics ==
As of the 2020 census there were 656 people, 345 households, and 282 families residing in the township. The population density was 11.44 inhabitants per square mile (4.42/km^{2}). There were 285 housing units at an average density of 4.97 per square mile (1.92/km^{2}). The racial makeup of the township was 95.27% White, 0.30% African American, 0.15% Native American, 0.15% Asian, 0.00% Pacific Islander, 0.46% from other races, and 3.66% from two or more races. Hispanic or Latino of any race were 1.83% of the population.

There were 345 households, out of which 22.00% had children under the age of 18 living with them, 71.30% were married couples living together, 7.25% had a female householder with no spouse present, and 18.26% were non-families. 18.30% of all households were made up of individuals, and 0.00% had someone living alone who was 65 years of age or older. The average household size was 2.01 and the average family size was 2.23.

The township's age distribution consisted of 14.3% under the age of 18, 0.4% from 18 to 24, 27.8% from 25 to 44, 34.8% from 45 to 64, and 22.8% who were 65 years of age or older. The median age was 49.6 years. For every 100 females, there were 90.7 males. For every 100 females age 18 and over, there were 99.0 males.

The median income for a household in the township was $64,063, and the median income for a family was $80,625. Males had a median income of $51,964 versus $25,871 for females. The per capita income for the township was $31,724. About 5.3% of families and 6.2% of the population were below the poverty line, including none of those under age 18 and 19.6% of those age 65 or over.

Historical population
| Census | Pop. | Note | %± |
|---|---|---|---|
| 2010 | 729 | | — |
| 2020 | 656 | | −10.0% |
U.S. Decennial Census
