= Sturgis Municipal Airport (Kentucky) =

- IATA: none; ICAO: KTWT; FAA LID: TWT

Summary
- Airport type: Public
- Owner: Union County
- Serves: Sturgis, Kentucky
- Location: Union County, near Sturgis, Kentucky
- Elevation AMSL: 372 ft / 113 m
- Coordinates: 37°32′30″N 087°57′16″W
- Website: SturgisAirport.com
- Interactive map of Sturgis Municipal Airport

Runways
Direction	Length		Surface
Direction	ft	m	Surface
1/19	5,000	1,524	Asphalt

Statistics (2016)
- Aircraft operations (year ending 11/8/2016): 8,900
- Source: Federal Aviation Administration

Sturgis Municipal Airport (ICAO: KTWT, FAA LID: TWT) is a public use airport located two nautical miles (4 km) east of the central business district of Sturgis, a city in Union County, Kentucky, United States. It is owned by the Union County Air Board. The airport was built in 1941 by the U.S. Army to provide pilot training during World War II.

Although most U.S. airports use the same three-letter location identifier for the FAA and IATA, this airport is assigned TWT by the FAA but has no designation from the IATA (which assigned TWT to an airport in Tawitawi, Philippines).

== Facilities and aircraft ==
Sturgis Municipal Airport covers an area of 1,307 acres (529 ha) at an elevation of 372 feet (113 m) above mean sea level. It has one asphalt paved runway designated 1/19 which measures 5,000 by 75 feet (1,524 x 23 m).

For the 12-month period ending November 8, 2016, the airport had 8,900 aircraft operations, an average of 24 per day: 88% general aviation, 9% air taxi and 3% military.

== See also ==
- List of airports in Kentucky
