= Denison Township, Lawrence County, Illinois =

Denison Township
- Township

- Location of Illinois in the United States
- Coordinates: 38°37′43″N 87°41′40″W
- Country: United States
- State: Illinois
- County: Lawrence
- Settled: November 4, 1856

Area
  - Total: 58.37 sq mi (151.2 km^{2})
  - Land: 57.90 sq mi (150.0 km^{2})
  - Water: 0.47 sq mi (1.2 km^{2}) 0.81%
- Elevation: 492 ft (150 m)

Population (2020)
  - Total: 1,344
  - Density: 23.21/sq mi (8.962/km^{2})
- Time zone: UTC-6 (CST)
  - Summer (DST): UTC-5 (CDT)
- FIPS code: 17-101-19395

Denison Township is located in Lawrence County, Illinois. As of the 2020 census, its population was 1,344 and it contained 643 housing units.

The township's name honors William Denison, a county official.

== Geography ==
According to the 2021 census gazetteer files, Denison Township has a total area of 58.37 square miles (151.18 km^{2}), of which 57.90 square miles (149.96 km^{2}) (or 99.19%) is land and 0.47 square miles (1.22 km^{2}) (or 0.81%) is water.

== Demographics ==
As of the 2020 census there were 1,344 people, 545 households, and 371 families residing in the township. The population density was 23.02 inhabitants per square mile (8.89/km^{2}). There were 643 housing units at an average density of 11.02 per square mile (4.25/km^{2}). The racial makeup of the township was 94.64% White, 0.07% African American, 0.52% Native American, 0.00% Asian, 0.15% Pacific Islander, 0.67% from other races, and 3.94% from two or more races. Hispanic or Latino of any race were 1.34% of the population.

There were 545 households, out of which 15.00% had children under the age of 18 living with them, 55.23% were married couples living together, 9.72% had a female householder with no spouse present, and 31.93% were non-families. 29.40% of all households were made up of individuals, and 8.40% had someone living alone who was 65 years of age or older. The average household size was 1.88 and the average family size was 2.23.

The township's age distribution consisted of 12.7% under the age of 18, 3.0% from 18 to 24, 22.6% from 25 to 44, 31% from 45 to 64, and 30.7% who were 65 years of age or older. The median age was 54.7 years. For every 100 females, there were 110.3 males. For every 100 females age 18 and over, there were 102.7 males.

The median income for a household in the township was $44,837, and the median income for a family was $59,063. Males had a median income of $32,600 versus $25,114 for females. The per capita income for the township was $34,626. About 8.9% of families and 12.6% of the population were below the poverty line, including 38.5% of those under age 18 and 3.2% of those age 65 or over.

Historical population
Census	Pop.	Note	%±
2010	1,558		—
2020	1,344		−13.7%
U.S. Decennial Census
