= Lawrence County, Illinois =

County in Illinois, United States

- County
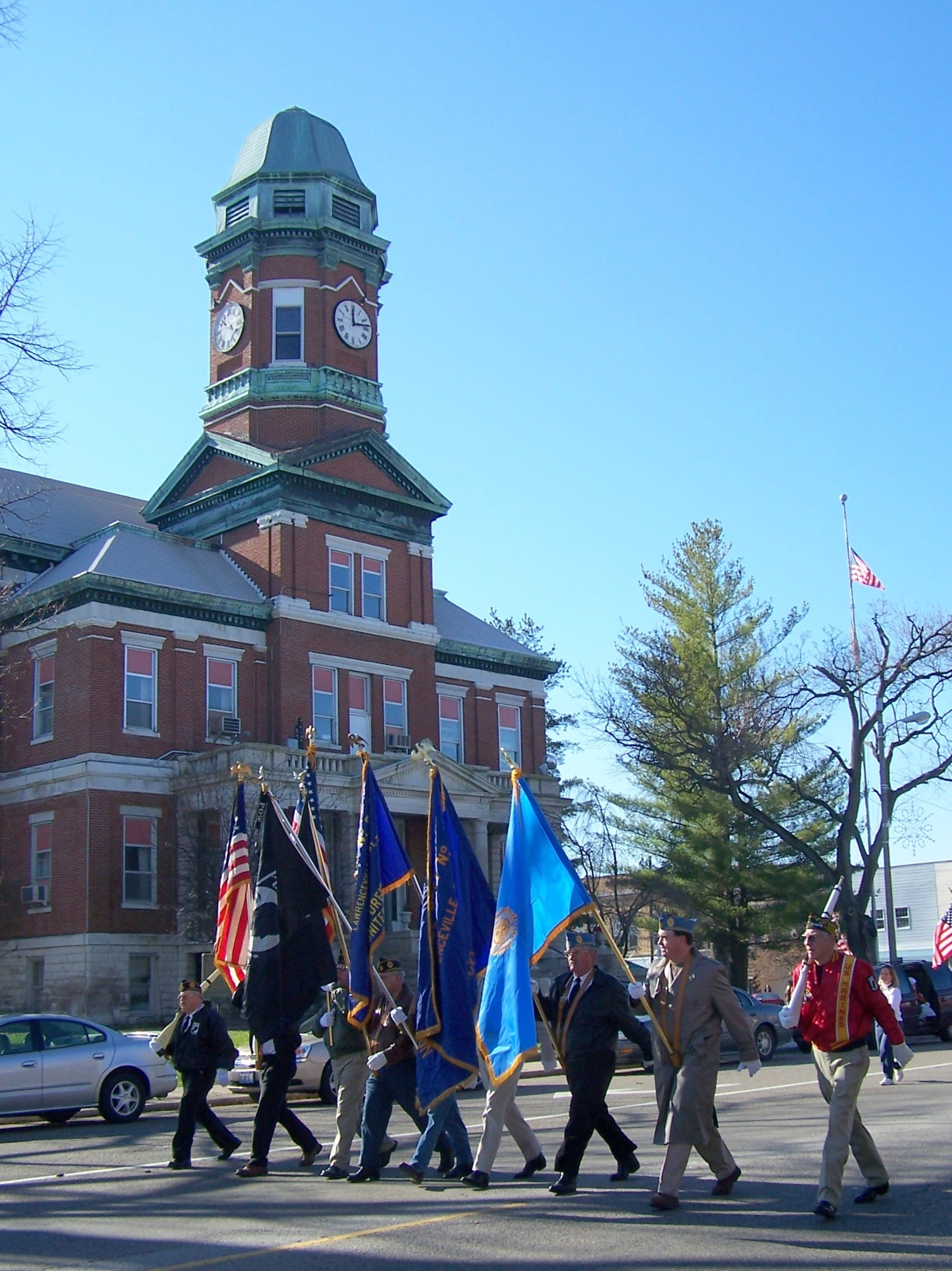
- Lawrence County Courthouse in Lawrenceville

- Location within the U.S. state of Illinois
- Coordinates: 38°43′N 87°44′W
- Country: United States
- State: Illinois
- Founded: 1821
- Named for: James Lawrence
- Seat: Lawrenceville
- Largest city: Lawrenceville

Area
  - Total: 374 sq mi (970 km^{2})
  - Land: 372 sq mi (960 km^{2})
  - Water: 2.0 sq mi (5.2 km^{2})

Population (2020)
  - Total: 15,280
  - Estimate (2025): 13,790 ▼
  - Density: 41.1/sq mi (15.9/km^{2})
- Time zone: UTC−6 (Central)
  - Summer (DST): UTC−5 (CDT)
- Congressional district: 12th
- Website: lawrencecounty.illinois.gov

Lawrence County is the easternmost county in the U.S. state of Illinois. At the 2020 census, the population was 15,280. Its county seat is Lawrenceville.

== History ==
Lawrence County was formed in 1821 out of Crawford and Edwards counties. It was named for Capt. James Lawrence, who was killed in action during the War of 1812 while commanding the frigate USS Chesapeake. Mortally wounded, he gave his men the famous last order, "Don't give up the ship."

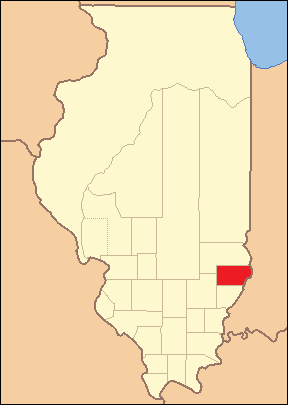
Lawrence County from its creation in 1821 to 1824

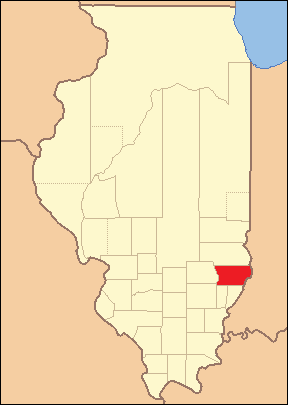
Lawrence County between 1824 and 1841

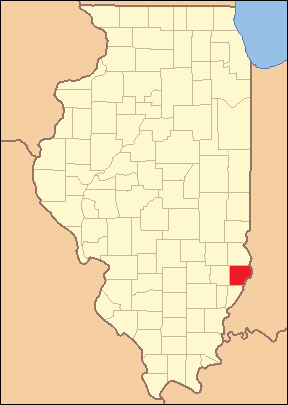
Lawrence County in 1841, when the creation of Richland County reduced Lawrence to its current size

== Geography ==
According to the U.S. Census Bureau, the county has a total area of 374 square miles (970 km^{2}), of which 372 square miles (960 km^{2}) is land and 2.0 square miles (5.2 km^{2}) (0.5%) is water.

=== Climate and weather ===
Lawrenceville, Illinois

Climate chart (precipitation, max. and min. temperature)
J	F	M	A	M	J	J	A	S	O	N	D
2.6 36 18	2.5 42 22	3.6 53 32	4.3 65 42	5.1 75 52	4.1 84 61	4.7 88 65	3.7 86 63	3.2 80 54	3.2 68 42	4.3 54 33	3.2 42 23
- █ Average max. and min. temperatures in °F
- █ Precipitation totals in inches
- Source: The Weather Channel
Metric conversion
J	F	M	A	M	J	J	A	S	O	N	D
66 2 −8	64 6 −6	91 12 0	109 18 6	130 24 11	103 29 16	119 31 18	94 30 17	80 27 12	82 20 6	108 12 1	82 6 −5
- █ Average max. and min. temperatures in °C
- █ Precipitation totals in mm

In recent years, average temperatures in the county seat of Lawrenceville have ranged from a low of 18 °F (−8 °C) in January to a high of 88 °F (31 °C) in July, although a record low of −26 °F (−32 °C) was recorded in January 1994 and a record high of 104 °F (40 °C) was recorded in June 1988. Average monthly precipitation ranged from 2.51 inches (64 mm) in February to 5.13 inches (130 mm) in May.

=== Transit ===
- Rides Mass Transit District

=== Major highways ===
- U.S. Route 50
- Illinois Route 1
- Illinois Route 33
- Illinois Route 250

=== Adjacent counties ===
- Crawford County - north
- Knox County, Indiana - east
- Wabash County - south
- Richland County - west

== Demographics ==
Historical population
Census	Pop.	Note	%±
1830	3,668		—
1840	7,092		93.3%
1850	6,121		−13.7%
1860	9,214		50.5%
1870	12,533		36.0%
1880	13,663		9.0%
1890	14,693		7.5%
1900	16,523		12.5%
1910	22,661		37.1%
1920	21,380		−5.7%
1930	21,885		2.4%
1940	21,075		−3.7%
1950	20,539		−2.5%
1960	18,540		−9.7%
1970	17,522		−5.5%
1980	17,807		1.6%
1990	15,972		−10.3%
2000	15,452		−3.3%
2010	16,833		8.9%
2020	15,280		−9.2%
2025 (est.)	13,790	▼	−9.8%
U.S. Decennial Census; 1790-1960 1900-1990; 1990-2000 2010-2013

2000 census age pyramid for Lawrence County

=== 2020 census ===
As of the 2020 census, the county had a population of 15,280. The median age was 41.4 years. 19.3% of residents were under the age of 18 and 19.1% of residents were 65 years of age or older. For every 100 females there were 124.9 males, and for every 100 females age 18 and over there were 129.6 males age 18 and over.

The racial makeup of the county was 84.3% White, 9.2% Black or African American, 0.1% American Indian and Alaska Native, 0.4% Asian, 0.1% Native Hawaiian and Pacific Islander, 2.4% from some other race, and 3.6% from two or more races. Hispanic or Latino residents of any race comprised 3.4% of the population.

30.3% of residents lived in urban areas, while 69.7% lived in rural areas.

There were 5,571 households in the county, of which 28.3% had children under the age of 18 living in them. Of all households, 47.3% were married-couple households, 18.7% were households with a male householder and no spouse or partner present, and 27.0% were households with a female householder and no spouse or partner present. About 30.7% of all households were made up of individuals and 14.7% had someone living alone who was 65 years of age or older.

There were 6,279 housing units, of which 11.3% were vacant. Among occupied housing units, 73.8% were owner-occupied and 26.2% were renter-occupied. The homeowner vacancy rate was 1.7% and the rental vacancy rate was 10.4%.

=== 2020 census ===
Lawrence County County, Illinois – Racial and ethnic composition Note: the US Census treats Hispanic/Latino as an ethnic category. This table excludes Latinos from the racial categories and assigns them to a separate category. Hispanics/Latinos may be of any race.
Race / Ethnicity (NH = Non-Hispanic)	Pop 1980	Pop 1990	Pop 2000	Pop 2010	Pop 2020	% 1980	% 1990	% 2000	% 2010	% 2020
White alone (NH)	17,522	15,709	15,053	14,491	12,777	98.40%	98.35%	97.42%	86.09%	83.62%
Black or African American alone (NH)	138	151	118	1,583	1,393	0.77%	0.95%	0.76%	9.40%	9.12%
Native American or Alaska Native alone (NH)	15	31	19	30	12	0.08%	0.19%	0.12%	0.18%	0.08%
Asian alone (NH)	25	20	18	38	58	0.14%	0.13%	0.12%	0.23%	0.38%
Native Hawaiian or Pacific Islander alone (NH)	x	x	0	1	7	x	x	0.00%	0.01%	0.05%
Other race alone (NH)	14	5	5	8	29	0.08%	0.03%	0.03%	0.05%	0.19%
Mixed race or Multiracial (NH)	x	x	102	129	490	x	x	0.66%	0.77%	3.21%
Hispanic or Latino (any race)	93	56	137	553	514	0.52%	0.35%	0.89%	3.29%	3.36%
Total	17,807	15,972	15,452	16,833	15,280	100.00%	100.00%	100.00%	100.00%	100.00%

=== 2010 census ===
As of the 2010 United States census, there were 16,833 people, 6,130 households, and 4,056 families living in the county. The population density was 45.2 inhabitants per square mile (17.5/km^{2}). There were 6,936 housing units at an average density of 18.6 per square mile (7.2/km^{2}). The racial makeup of the county was 87.3% white, 9.6% black or African American, 0.2% Asian, 0.2% American Indian, 1.7% from other races, and 1.0% from two or more races. Those of Hispanic or Latino origin made up 3.3% of the population. In terms of ancestry, 12.7% were German, 10.4% were American, 9.5% were Irish, and 7.8% were English.

Of the 6,130 households, 28.6% had children under the age of 18 living with them, 50.7% were married couples living together, 10.7% had a female householder with no husband present, 33.8% were non-families, and 30.1% of all households were made up of individuals. The average household size was 2.34 and the average family size was 2.88. The median age was 39.7 years.

The median income for a household in the county was $38,771 and the median income for a family was $45,565. Males had a median income of $40,949 versus $25,991 for females. The per capita income for the county was $19,297. About 14.8% of families and 17.5% of the population were below the poverty line, including 26.9% of those under age 18 and 7.7% of those age 65 or over.

== Communities ==
=== Cities ===
- Bridgeport
- Lawrenceville (seat)
- St. Francisville
- Sumner

=== Village ===
- Russellville

=== Unincorporated communities ===
- Billett
- Birds
- Chauncey
- Petrolia
- Pinkstaff
- Riddleville

=== Townships ===
Nine townships make up Lawrence County. They are:

- Allison
- Bond
- Bridgeport
- Christy
- Denison
- Lawrence
- Lukin
- Petty
- Russell

== Politics ==
In its early days, Lawrence County was a Democratic-leaning swing county, voting Republican only twice up to 1892 when it supported Ulysses S. Grant in 1872 and Benjamin Harrison in 1888. It did not vote for a losing Republican candidate until Wendell Willkie carried the county in 1940 due to isolationist sentiment. Since that time, however, Lawrence County – like so many in Southern Illinois – has become reliably Republican. The only Democrat to gain an absolute majority in the county since 1936 has been Lyndon Johnson in 1964, although Bill Clinton obtained pluralities in both 1992 and 1996.

United States presidential election results for Lawrence County, Illinois
Year	Republican		Democratic		Third party(ies)	
Year	No.	%	No.	%	No.	%
1892	1,523	45.30%	1,572	46.76%	267	7.94%
1896	1,972	49.41%	1,948	48.81%	71	1.78%
1900	1,961	48.03%	2,021	49.50%	101	2.47%
1904	1,969	50.64%	1,712	44.03%	207	5.32%
1908	2,197	47.16%	2,253	48.36%	209	4.49%
1912	1,617	30.39%	2,550	47.93%	1,153	21.67%
1916	4,481	44.47%	5,052	50.14%	543	5.39%
1920	4,720	54.17%	3,707	42.54%	287	3.29%
1924	4,607	51.50%	4,103	45.87%	235	2.63%
1928	5,851	60.16%	3,806	39.13%	69	0.71%
1932	4,194	40.17%	6,100	58.42%	147	1.41%
1936	5,060	44.39%	6,168	54.11%	170	1.49%
1940	6,061	51.22%	5,625	47.54%	147	1.24%
1944	5,191	55.79%	4,003	43.02%	111	1.19%
1948	4,472	49.38%	4,391	48.48%	194	2.14%
1952	6,207	61.54%	3,875	38.42%	4	0.04%
1956	6,104	61.89%	3,751	38.03%	7	0.07%
1960	6,120	62.45%	3,667	37.42%	13	0.13%
1964	4,176	44.85%	5,136	55.15%	0	0.00%
1968	4,883	54.58%	3,075	34.37%	988	11.04%
1972	5,347	65.36%	2,818	34.45%	16	0.20%
1976	4,345	51.47%	4,044	47.90%	53	0.63%
1980	4,453	56.68%	3,030	38.57%	373	4.75%
1984	4,686	61.35%	2,924	38.28%	28	0.37%
1988	3,655	53.57%	3,140	46.02%	28	0.41%
1992	2,681	35.80%	3,270	43.67%	1,537	20.53%
1996	2,568	40.18%	2,871	44.92%	953	14.91%
2000	3,594	54.64%	2,822	42.90%	162	2.46%
2004	4,162	61.85%	2,518	37.42%	49	0.73%
2008	3,403	51.89%	3,016	45.99%	139	2.12%
2012	3,857	64.40%	2,011	33.58%	121	2.02%
2016	4,521	74.19%	1,290	21.17%	283	4.64%
2020	4,886	76.08%	1,419	22.10%	117	1.82%
2024	4,715	76.97%	1,283	20.94%	128	2.09%

== See also ==
- National Register of Historic Places listings in Lawrence County, Illinois
