= Lawrenceville, Illinois =

- City
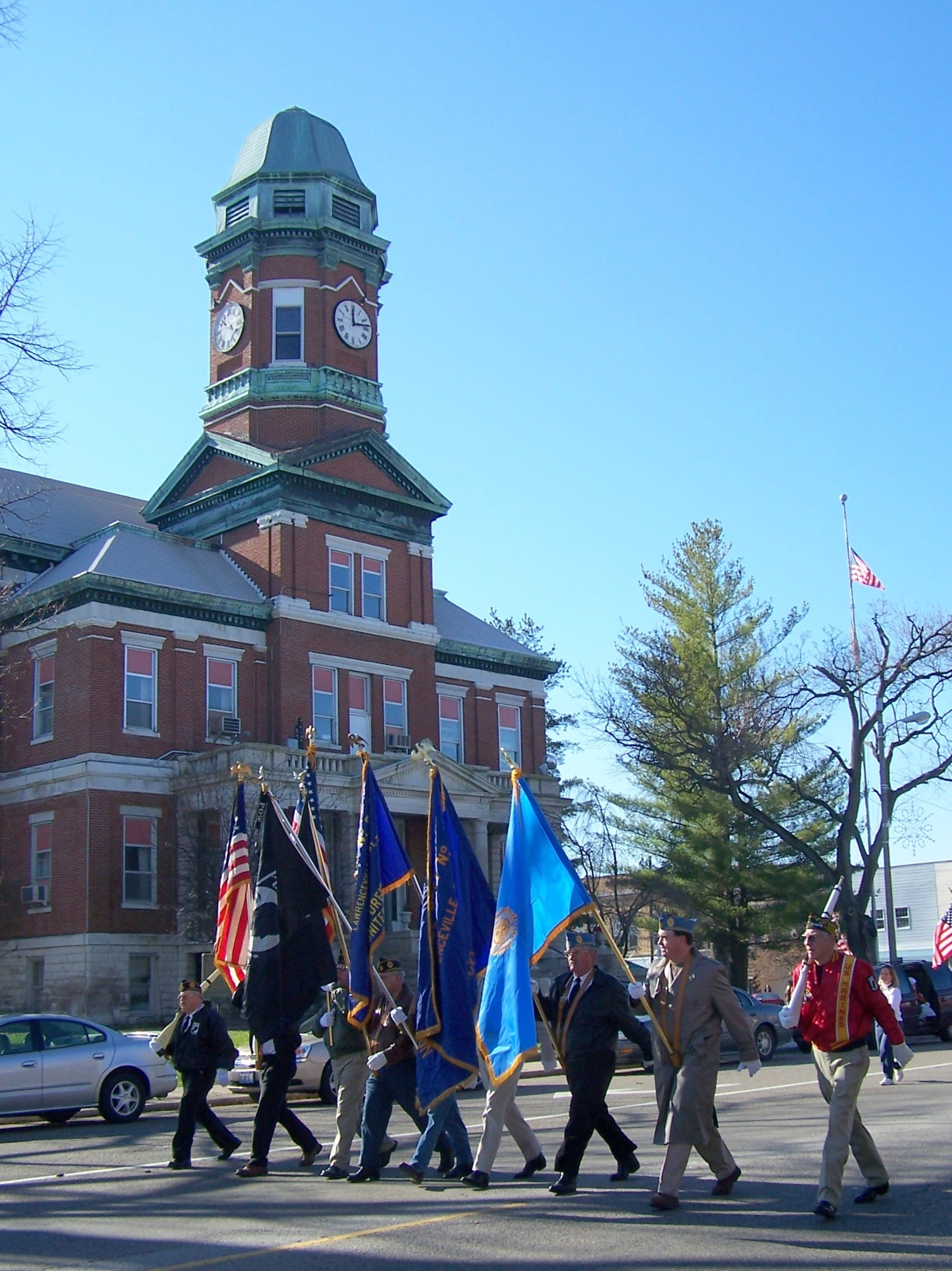
- Lawrence County Courthouse
- Interactive map of Lawrenceville, Illinois
- Location within Illinois Location within the United States
- Coordinates: 38°43′35″N 87°41′14″W
- Country: United States
- State: Illinois
- County: Lawrence

Area
  - Total: 2.16 sq mi (5.60 km^{2})
  - Land: 2.16 sq mi (5.60 km^{2})
  - Water: 0 sq mi (0.00 km^{2})
- Elevation: 446 ft (136 m)

Population (2020)
  - Total: 4,164
  - Density: 1,924.6/sq mi (743.08/km^{2})
- Time zone: UTC−6 (CST)
  - Summer (DST): UTC−5 (CDT)
- ZIP code: 62439
- Area code: 618
- FIPS code: 17-42405
- GNIS feature ID: 2395649
- Website: lawrencevilleil.org

Lawrenceville is a city in and the county seat of Lawrence County, Illinois, United States, located along the Embarras River. As of the 2020 census, Lawrenceville had a population of 4,164. Lawrenceville is located in southeast Illinois, northwest of Vincennes, Indiana.

== Geography ==
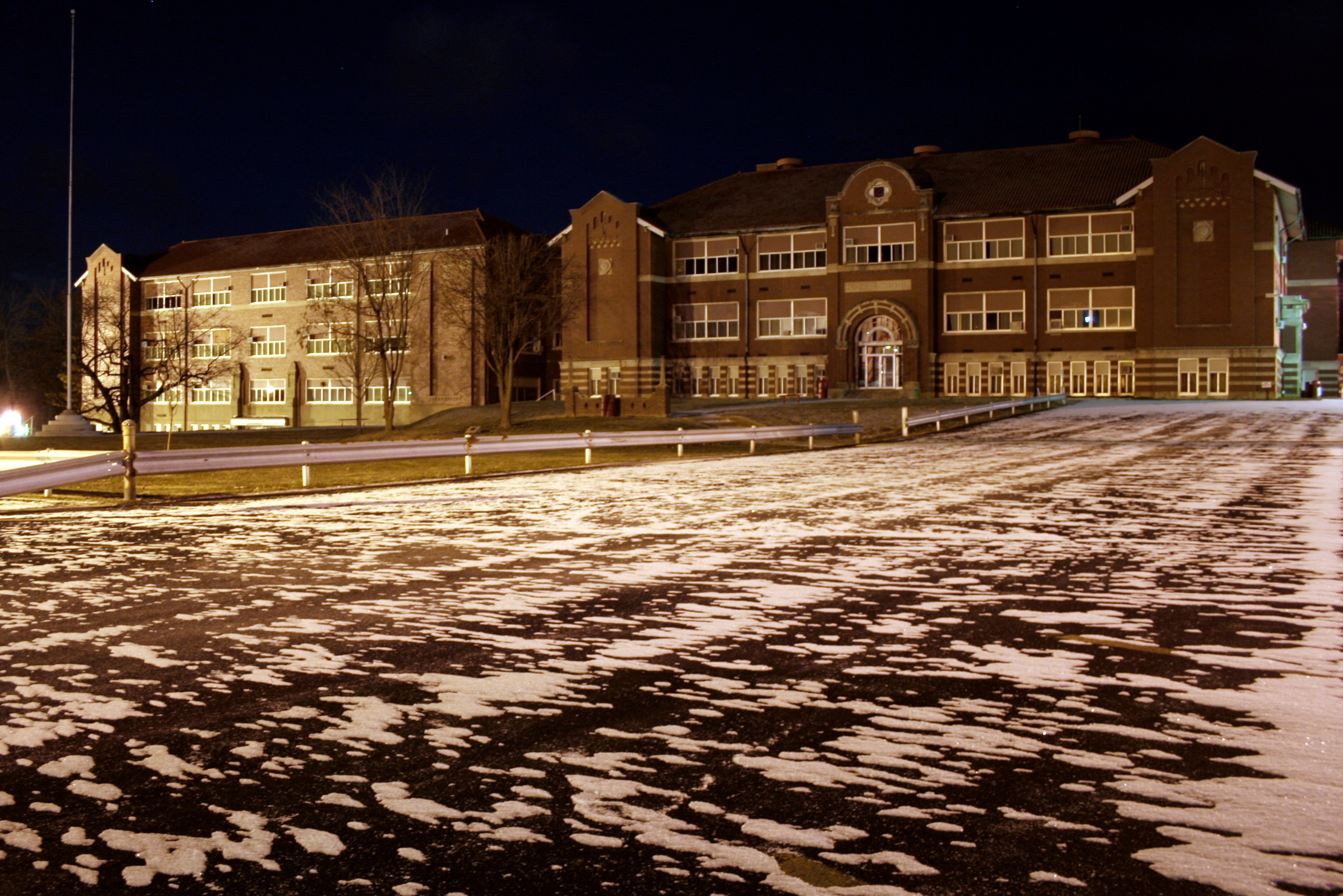
Lawrenceville High School.

According to the 2021 census gazetteer files, Lawrenceville has a total area of 2.16 square miles (5.59 km^{2}), all land.

=== Climate ===
According to the Köppen Climate Classification system, Lawrenceville has a humid subtropical climate, abbreviated "Cfa" on climate maps. The hottest temperature recorded in Lawrenceville was 107 °F (41.7 °C) on June 29, 2012, while the coldest temperature recorded was −19 °F (−28.3 °C) on January 19, 1994.

Climate data for Lawrenceville, Illinois, 1991–2020 normals, extremes 1963–1964, 1991–present
Month	Jan	Feb	Mar	Apr	May	Jun	Jul	Aug	Sep	Oct	Nov	Dec	Year
Record high °F (°C)	68 (20)	76 (24)	84 (29)	87 (31)	95 (35)	107 (42)	106 (41)	103 (39)	99 (37)	95 (35)	82 (28)	77 (25)	107 (42)
Mean maximum °F (°C)	61.3 (16.3)	66.8 (19.3)	75.1 (23.9)	81.3 (27.4)	89.6 (32.0)	94.8 (34.9)	96.4 (35.8)	95.8 (35.4)	93.1 (33.9)	85.5 (29.7)	74.5 (23.6)	62.5 (16.9)	97.8 (36.6)
Mean daily maximum °F (°C)	39.1 (3.9)	44.0 (6.7)	54.6 (12.6)	66.6 (19.2)	76.8 (24.9)	85.7 (29.8)	88.3 (31.3)	87.1 (30.6)	81.7 (27.6)	69.5 (20.8)	55.3 (12.9)	43.5 (6.4)	66.0 (18.9)
Daily mean °F (°C)	30.2 (−1.0)	34.3 (1.3)	43.7 (6.5)	54.7 (12.6)	65.2 (18.4)	74.1 (23.4)	77.0 (25.0)	75.2 (24.0)	68.7 (20.4)	56.8 (13.8)	44.7 (7.1)	34.6 (1.4)	54.9 (12.7)
Mean daily minimum °F (°C)	21.3 (−5.9)	24.5 (−4.2)	32.7 (0.4)	42.8 (6.0)	53.6 (12.0)	62.6 (17.0)	65.6 (18.7)	63.3 (17.4)	55.7 (13.2)	44.2 (6.8)	34.0 (1.1)	25.7 (−3.5)	43.8 (6.6)
Mean minimum °F (°C)	2.2 (−16.6)	7.1 (−13.8)	17.2 (−8.2)	29.4 (−1.4)	41.2 (5.1)	50.8 (10.4)	57.3 (14.1)	55.7 (13.2)	42.6 (5.9)	30.8 (−0.7)	21.3 (−5.9)	7.9 (−13.4)	−1.2 (−18.4)
Record low °F (°C)	−19 (−28)	−11 (−24)	6 (−14)	22 (−6)	32 (0)	41 (5)	50 (10)	46 (8)	34 (1)	21 (−6)	14 (−10)	−8 (−22)	−19 (−28)
Average precipitation inches (mm)	3.26 (83)	2.68 (68)	3.62 (92)	4.38 (111)	5.33 (135)	5.17 (131)	4.15 (105)	3.07 (78)	3.56 (90)	3.86 (98)	4.09 (104)	3.43 (87)	46.60 (1,184)
Average snowfall inches (cm)	3.8 (9.7)	4.2 (11)	1.8 (4.6)	0.0 (0.0)	0.0 (0.0)	0.0 (0.0)	0.0 (0.0)	0.0 (0.0)	0.0 (0.0)	0.1 (0.25)	0.4 (1.0)	5.2 (13)	15.5 (39.55)
Average extreme snow depth inches (cm)	4.0 (10)	2.5 (6.4)	1.4 (3.6)	0.0 (0.0)	0.0 (0.0)	0.0 (0.0)	0.0 (0.0)	0.0 (0.0)	0.0 (0.0)	0.1 (0.25)	0.2 (0.51)	3.2 (8.1)	6.5 (17)
Average precipitation days (≥ 0.01 in)	9.8	9.1	9.9	10.2	11.4	9.8	8.1	6.7	6.5	7.8	8.8	9.5	107.6
Average snowy days (≥ 0.1 in)	4.1	3.7	1.5	0.0	0.0	0.0	0.0	0.0	0.0	0.1	0.5	2.8	12.7
Source 1: NOAA
Source 2: National Weather Service

== Demographics ==
Historical population
Census	Pop.	Note	%±
1850	419		—
1860	474		13.1%
1870	435		−8.2%
1880	514		18.2%
1890	865		68.3%
1900	1,300		50.3%
1910	3,235		148.8%
1920	5,080		57.0%
1930	6,303		24.1%
1940	6,213		−1.4%
1950	6,328		1.9%
1960	5,492		−13.2%
1970	5,863		6.8%
1980	5,652		−3.6%
1990	4,897		−13.4%
2000	4,745		−3.1%
2010	4,348		−8.4%
2020	4,164		−4.2%
U.S. Decennial Census

=== 2020 census ===
As of the 2020 census, Lawrenceville had a population of 4,164 and 1,796 households. The population density was 1,924.21 inhabitants per square mile (742.94/km^{2}). There were 2,071 housing units at an average density of 957.02 per square mile (369.51/km^{2}).

The median age was 39.7 years. 22.8% of residents were under the age of 18 and 20.3% were 65 years of age or older. For every 100 females there were 90.4 males, and for every 100 females age 18 and over there were 86.4 males age 18 and over.

98.2% of residents lived in urban areas, while 1.8% lived in rural areas.

Of households, 26.9% had children under the age of 18 living in them. 35.1% were married-couple households, 20.3% were households with a male householder and no spouse or partner present, and 35.5% were households with a female householder and no spouse or partner present. About 37.3% of all households were made up of individuals, and 18.4% had someone living alone who was 65 years of age or older.

Of housing units, 13.3% were vacant. The homeowner vacancy rate was 1.9% and the rental vacancy rate was 12.3%.

Racial composition as of the 2020 census
Race	Number	Percent
White	3,812	91.5%
Black or African American	60	1.4%
American Indian and Alaska Native	4	0.1%
Asian	19	0.5%
Native Hawaiian and Other Pacific Islander	3	0.1%
Some other race	37	0.9%
Two or more races	229	5.5%
Hispanic or Latino (of any race)	98	2.4%

=== Income and poverty ===
The median income for a household in the city was $41,004, and the median income for a family was $43,100. Males had a median income of $32,226 versus $27,577 for females. The per capita income for the city was $24,600. About 14.8% of families and 19.9% of the population were below the poverty line, including 34.2% of those under age 18 and 4.1% of those age 65 or over.

== Notable people ==
- George C. Armstrong, Illinois state senator, mayor of Lawrenceville, and newspaper editor
- Philip B. Benefiel, Illinois state senator, lawyer, and judge
- Mordecai Brown, Hall of Fame pitcher for Chicago Cubs and St. Louis Cardinals
- Garrel Burgoon, Illinois state representative and businessman
- Frances Crane, mystery author; born in Lawrenceville
- Lyman W. Emmons (1885–1955), American businessman and politician
- Herschella Horton, Arizona state representative
- Lyle Judy, second baseman for the St. Louis Cardinals; born in Lawrenceville
- William McAndrew, football and basketball coach
- Jason Pargin, known by his pen name David Wong is an American comedy and horror writer.
- Jack Ryan, MLB pitcher for the Cleveland Naps, Boston Red Sox and Brooklyn Dodgers
- Marty Simmons, current head men's basketball coach at Eastern Illinois University
- Maurice Cole Tanquary A professor of entomology and member of the Crocker Land Expedition.
