= Tuttle Bottoms Monster =

The Tuttle Bottoms Monster is a legendary creature said to inhabit a swampy area, north of Harrisburg, Illinois, on the Saline River watershed, usually described as ape-like and hairy with a long snout similar to an anteater.

== Reports ==
The Tuttle Bottoms Monster legend is familiar to generations of Saline County residents. Former Harrisburg Police Chief Gary Crabtree told the Harrisburg Daily Register that his department received approximately 50 reports over 28 years of an unidentified beast in the area northwest of Harrisburg, some reporting a creature with two legs and some with four. Most described it as having a long, almost anteater-like snout.

On August 6, 1963, The Harrisburg Daily Register reported what seemed to be the first report of the creature.

"Saline County Sheriff James L. Thompson spent a busy night last night, starting about 11 p.m. and ending about 4:30 a.m. The Sheriff said he ran across a youth at Tuttle Bottoms about 11 p.m. The young man was armed with a rifle and told Thompson that there was a monster loose in the bottoms. He said it was eight feet long, four feet high and had a nose like an anteater. The young man put his rifle in his car and left, and later Thompson ran across about a dozen boys, armed with shotguns and other weapons and all looking for the “monster” in the bottoms. Their Sheriff soon dispersed the boys and sent them home."

A local resident named Virgil Smith told the Register he believes the creature is not a monster out of myth but was an actual animal "released by the federal government" that has long since died. Smith said the creature was a hairy primate, stood on two legs, and was not scared of humans, adding that one couple reported the animal walked right up to them. Smith also claims that a former employee of the U.S. Department of Agriculture confided to him that the department had launched a private investigation into the Tuttle Bottoms Monster.

The earliest reports of the creature date to the 1960s by teenagers who used the area as a local "make-out" spot and by hunters who would make frantic calls to the police after seeing the creature. It was rumored that some murders took place in the Bottoms during that time.
