= Harco =

Harco may refer to:

- Harco, Illinois, United States
- Harcó, a village in Pănet, Romania
- Harco, Inc., an American drugstore chain acquired by Rite Aid Corporation
- Harco (Harlow Chemical Company), a chemical company based in Harlow, United Kingdom, part of Synthomer
