= Saline County Courthouse (Illinois) =

Government building in the US

Coordinates: 37°44′19″N 88°32′23″W

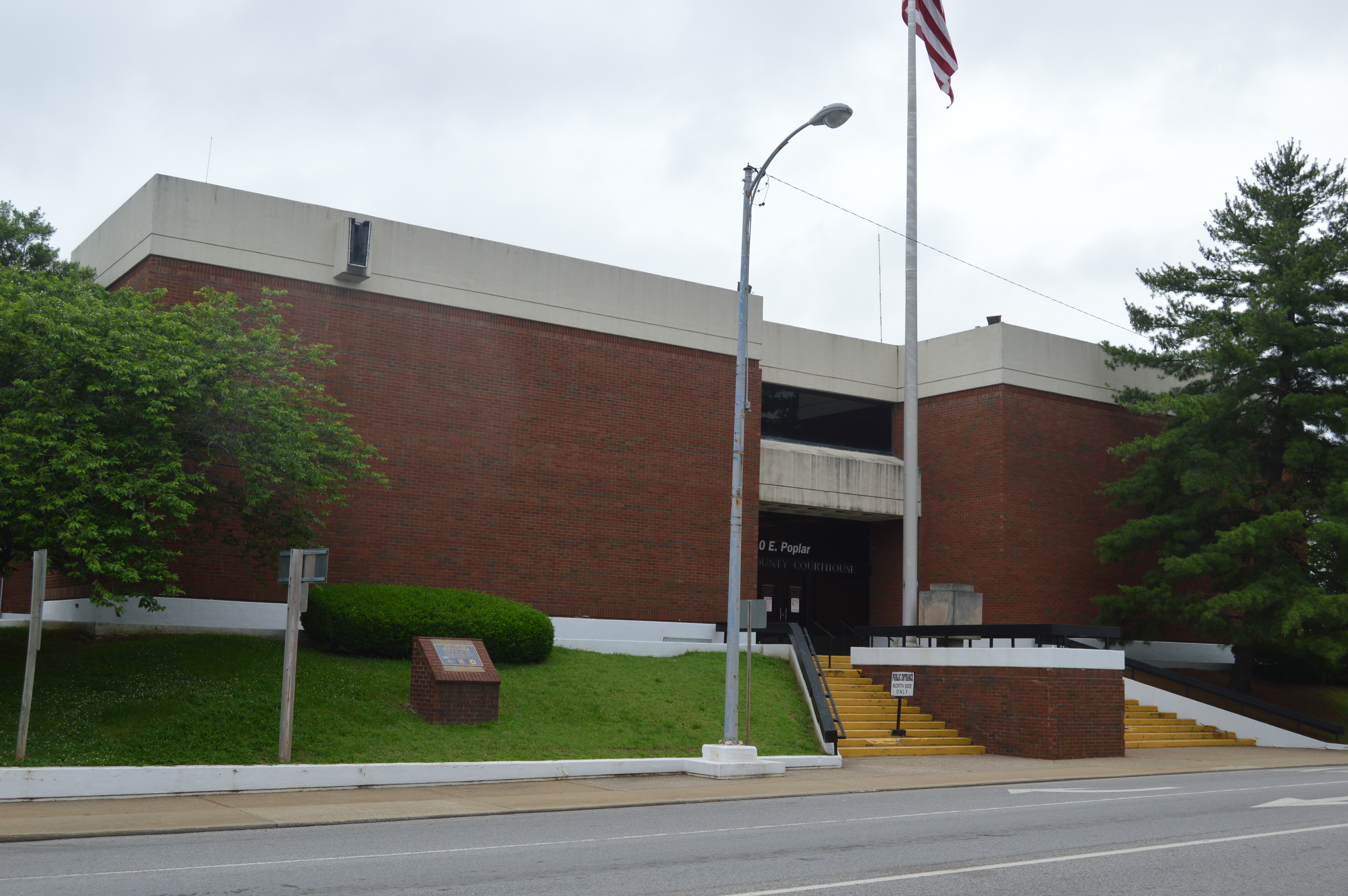
Southern front of the courthouse at 10 E. Poplar Street

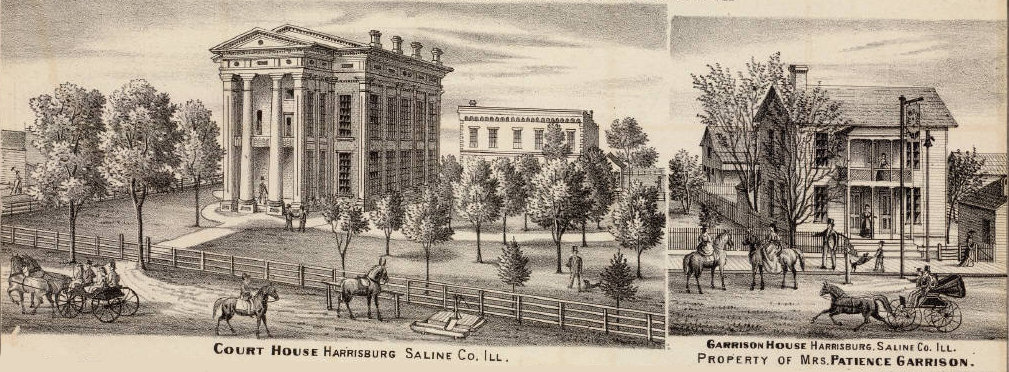
1861 courthouse (left)

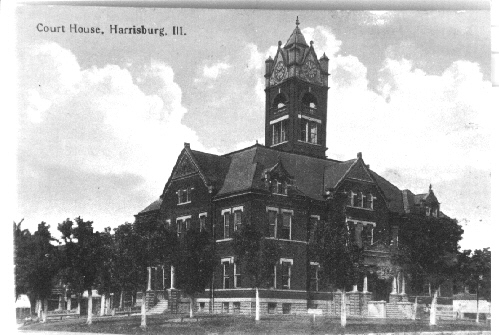
Postcard of the 1904 courthouse

The Saline County Courthouse is a government building in Harrisburg, the county seat of Saline County, Illinois, United States. Built in 1967, it is the fifth courthouse to serve the county and the third in Harrisburg.

The first land purchase in present-day Saline County occurred late in 1814, at a time when the nearby Illinois Salines in today's Gallatin County were still providing the majority of the area's income. The area was then part of Gallatin County, within which it remained until 1847. County officials began to meet in October 1847, and by the year's end, a county seat had been platted and named "Raleigh". Because Raleigh lies in far northern Saline County, in 1853 southern residents platted a new town, Harrisburg, on high ground near the Saline River. County voters narrowly supported moving the seat in an 1857 election, although a court battle delayed the move for two years, and the community did not incorporate until 1861.

By the end of 1848, Saline County's first courthouse was complete; it was a simple frame building, and it grew inadequate so rapidly that a brick replacement was erected and opened in early 1854. With the transfer of county seat status to Harrisburg, plans for a new courthouse were laid beginning in early 1859, and the third courthouse opened around New Year's, 1861. It was a Greek Revival structure with Doric columns and a portico on the facade. It was removed in 1904 in order to construct a larger courthouse, three stories high with an attached clock tower, and this building in turn was removed in 1967 to permit the completion of the current courthouse. Unlike the artistic previous courthouses, the current and fifth courthouse located at 10 E. Poplar St. is a plain Modernist structure with windowless brick walls and a recessed main entrance atop a shallow flight of stairs.
