= Harrisburg-Raleigh Airport =

Municipal airport serving Harrisburg, Illinois, United States

- IATA: HSB; ICAO: KHSB; FAA LID: HSB

Summary
- Airport type: Public
- Owner: City of Merced
- Serves: Harrisburg, Illinois
- Elevation AMSL: 398 ft / 121 m
- Coordinates: 37°48′41″N 88°32′56″W

Map

Runways
| Direction | Length | | Surface |
| Direction | ft | m | Surface |
|---|---|---|---|
| 06/24 | 5,013 | 1,528 | Asphalt |
| 14/32 | 2,764 | 842 | Asphalt |
- Source: Federal Aviation Administration.

Harrisburg-Raleigh airport is a civil, public-use airport located four miles north of the town of Harrisburg, Illinois and just southwest of Raleigh, Illinois in Saline County. The airport is publicly owned.

The airport has two asphalt runways. Runway 6/24 measures 5013 x 75 ft (1528 x 23 m) and runway 14/32 measures 2764 x 75 ft (842 x 23 m).

For the 12-month period ending March 31, 2018, the airport averaged 49 aircraft operations per day, or about 18,000 per year. This consists of 90% general aviation, 8% air taxi, and 2% military. For the same time frame, there were 15 aircraft based on the airport: 13 single-engine airplanes, 1 multi-engine airplane, and 1 helicopter. The airport ranks #301 out of 323 airport in Illinois.

The airport has an fixed-base operator offering fuel, general maintenance, courtesy cars, conference rooms, snooze rooms, and more.

== See also ==
- List of airports in Illinois
