= Cairo and Vincennes Railroad =

19th-century American railroad

Map

The Cairo and Vincennes Railroad was a 19th-century American railroad that connected Cairo, Illinois, with Vincennes, Indiana. It was chartered by the state of Illinois in 1867 through the efforts of former American Civil War General Green B. Raum, who subsequently oversaw the planning and engineering of the proposed line. Within a few years, the fledgling railroad company named another former general, Ambrose Burnside, as its president. The Cairo & Vincennes began laying track in 1870 and completed the initial portion in 1872 to haul coal from southern Illinois mines. However, the route was not fully completed until late in 1874.

In January 1874, the railroad was teetering on bankruptcy and the contractors, the firm of Winslow & Wilson, applied for control. In February, a new board of directors assumed control of the railroad and named industrialist J. P. Morgan as the new president, replacing Burnside. In April, the C&V formally went into receivership. The next month, receivers H. L. Morrill and A. B. Salford took possession of the Cairo and Vincennes Railroad.

The line was reorganized into the Cairo and Vincennes Railway in 1880, which in turn became part of the Wabash, St. Louis and Pacific Railway in 1881, but was resold to the Cairo, Vincennes and Chicago Railway at the Wabash's foreclosure in 1889. The CV&C became part of the Cleveland, Cincinnati, Chicago and St. Louis Railway (Big Four) system, which itself became part of the New York Central Railroad system in 1906. With the exception of a small portion in Carmi now a part of the Evansville Western Railway and a small segment in Mount Carmel occasionally used by the Norfolk Southern Railway, the entire line has been abandoned, though the right of way, with numerous concrete bridges, remains mostly intact. The bridge over the Wabash River also remains, now operated as a toll bridge by the town of St. Francisville for automobile traffic. Part, in Illinois, has been rededicated as the Tunnel Hill State Trail.

== Cities on the line ==
- Vincennes, Indiana
- St. Francisville, Illinois
- Allendale, Illinois
- Mt. Carmel, Illinois
- Keensburg, Illinois
- Grayville, Illinois
- Crossville, Illinois
- Carmi, Illinois
- Norris City, Illinois
- Eldorado, Illinois
- Muddy, Illinois
- Harrisburg, Illinois
- Ledford, Illinois
- Carrier Mills, Illinois
- Stonefort, Illinois
- New Burnside, Illinois
- Parker City, Illinois
- Tunnel Hill, Illinois
- Vienna, Illinois
- Forman, Illinois
- Mound City, Illinois
- Cairo, Illinois
