= Ledford, Illinois =

Ledford
- Unincorporated community
- Location of Ledford within Illinois Ledford (the United States)
- Coordinates: 37°42′00″N 88°35′24″W
- Country: United States
- State: Illinois
- County: Saline
- Founded: September 30th, 1880

Population (2000)
  - Total: 100
- Time zone: UTC-6 (CST)
  - Summer (DST): UTC-5 (CDT)
- ZIP code: 62946
- Area code: 618

Ledford is an unincorporated community in the Harrisburg Township, Saline County, Illinois, United States situated between Carrier Mills and Harrisburg, Illinois. It was named after a well known Ledford family in the area.

== History ==
In the late 19th and early 20th centuries, the peak of the coal boom in Saline County, it was a thriving mining center home to more than 1000 people.

It lies three miles South of Harrisburg on US 45. At one time, it had a population of 1,100 to 1,400 people. According to an early edition of the Harrisburg Daily Register, there was a time during the first 10 years of the 20th century that the population of Ledford was larger than that of Harrisburg, the county seat. In 1905, Saline County had numerous small slope mines and 15 major shaft mines. Thirteen of these larger mines were along the Big Four Railroad that traveled through Ledford.

Around these mines were small communities of company houses that were called patches. In Ledford alone there was a 2 patch, 5 patch and a 14 patch, all named for the mine number that provided the company housing. Just south of Ledford was another patch of housing built by the Hungarians, called "Hunky Row" by the locals.

In the early 20th century, these coal mine settlements made up most of the population of Ledford. Prior to the opening of the coal mines, which began around 1870, the families that were scattered around Saline County were pioneer stock. Most came from New England. Around 1900 to 1910, 1,536 immigrants came to Saline County. Most came to work in the coal mines. Most had come from Hungary, Poland, Russia, and Lithuania. There is a Lithuanian cemetery, one of only handful in the United States. This cemetery was refurbished in 2018.

The town was known for its lavish gambling, partying, and nightlife. Notorious gangster Charlie Birger, who lived in Ledford, shot and murdered "Crip" Yates in Ledford on December 4, 1917.

At one time, Ledford had a jail, a post office (opened September 30, 1880 – January 30, 1882. Reopened Feb. 20, 1892 – Oct. 31, 1935), two Catholic Churches, a Baptist church, a parish school, East and West Ledford Schools, several grocery stores, a restaurant, a boarding house, and a pool room. Some say there was a roller skating rink and a movie house. Ledford even had its own movie star by the stage name of Frances McIntyre, a local actress. Her real name was Stella Stevers. Ledford also boasted large mining factories and industries that left a distinct fog throughout the town.

Ledford today has a cemetery, an abandoned Hungarian cemetery, and the Ledford Baptist Church. Ledford spreads across a 4-mile stretch of land along Rt. 45 between Carrier Mills and Harrisburg with several roads shooting off to the left and right of the highway.

Today, Ledford is considered part of Harrisburg, Illinois. Almost all signs of the mining industry are gone. The mines' air shafts and fans are gone as well as the many coal tipples and mine ponds that dotted the area. The smoke stacks are missing and the air is clean. Gone are the sounds of the tipples hoisting coal, the steam whistles signaling the men, and the occasional snorts of a steam locomotive or the groaning of a streetcar motor. Ledford is a quiet community with a population of only 100 people.

== Demographics ==
Historical population
Census	Pop.	Note	%±
1900	1,200		—
1910	599		−50.1%
1920	673		12.4%
1930	462		−31.4%
U.S. Decennial Census

== See also ==
- Harrisburg, Illinois
- Carrier Mills, Illinois
- Charlie Birger
