= Harrisburg City Hall =

- U.S. National Register of Historic Places
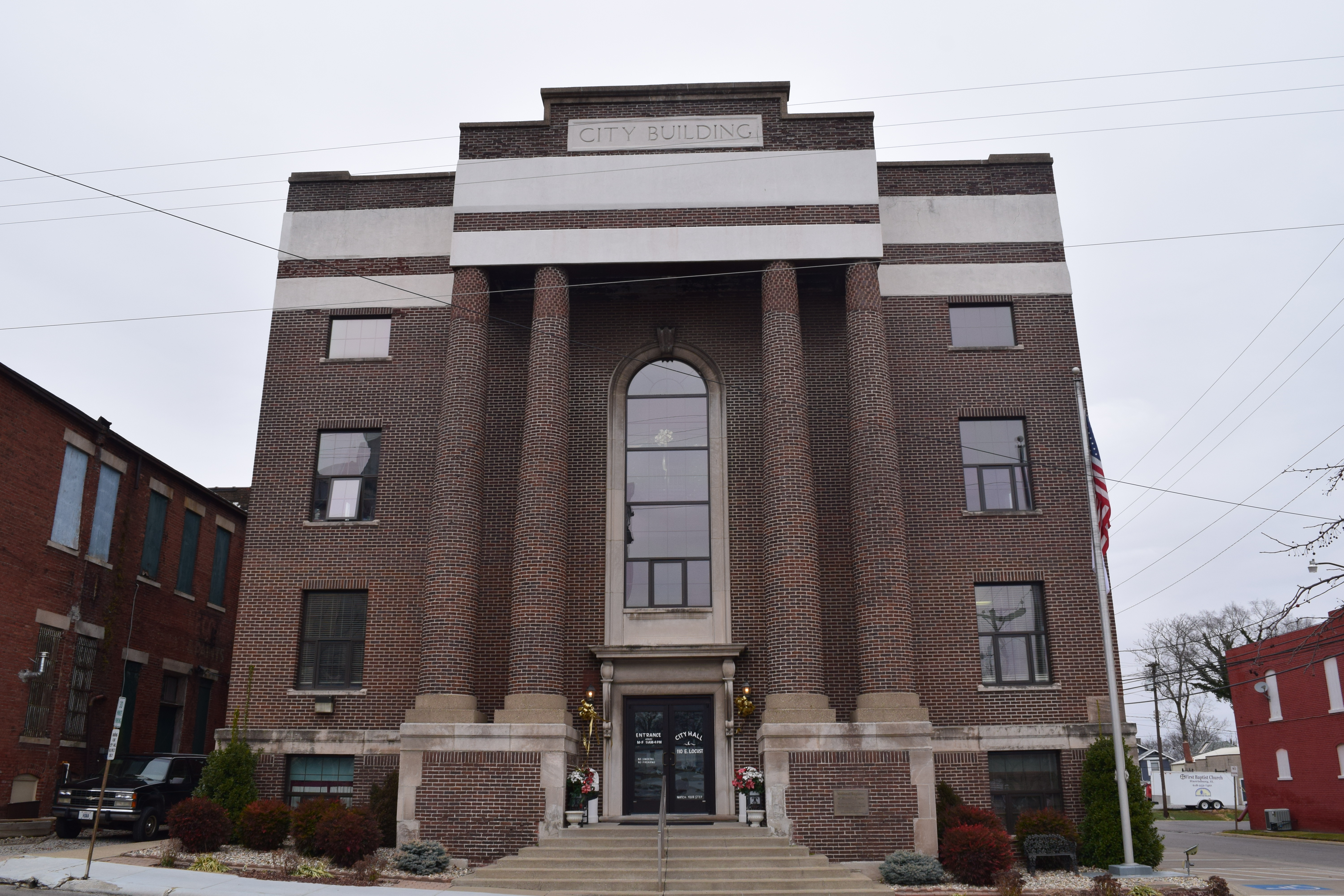

- Location within Illinois Location within the United States
- Location: 110 E. Locust, Harrisburg, Illinois
- Coordinates: 37°44′22″N 88°32′20″W
- Area: less than one acre
- Built: 1926-27
- Built by: Brannon and Parker
- Architect: Boyle, H. E., and Co.
- Architectural style: Classical Revival
- NRHP reference No.: 98001356
- Added to NRHP: November 12, 1998

The Harrisburg City Hall, located at 110 E. Locust St., is the city hall serving Harrisburg, Illinois. Built in 1926–27, the building is the city's second city hall. The architectural firm of Harry E. Boyle and Co. designed the building in the Classical Revival style. The city hall's entrance is covered by a portico extending from the roof; the portico is supported by four large brick columns spanning the height of the building. A band of white concrete encircles the top of the building; this band is topped by a parapet along the roof line. The building continues to house Harrisburg's city government; it also includes several local history displays for visitors to the city.

The building was added to the National Register of Historic Places on November 12, 1998.
