= Wid Matthews =

American baseball player

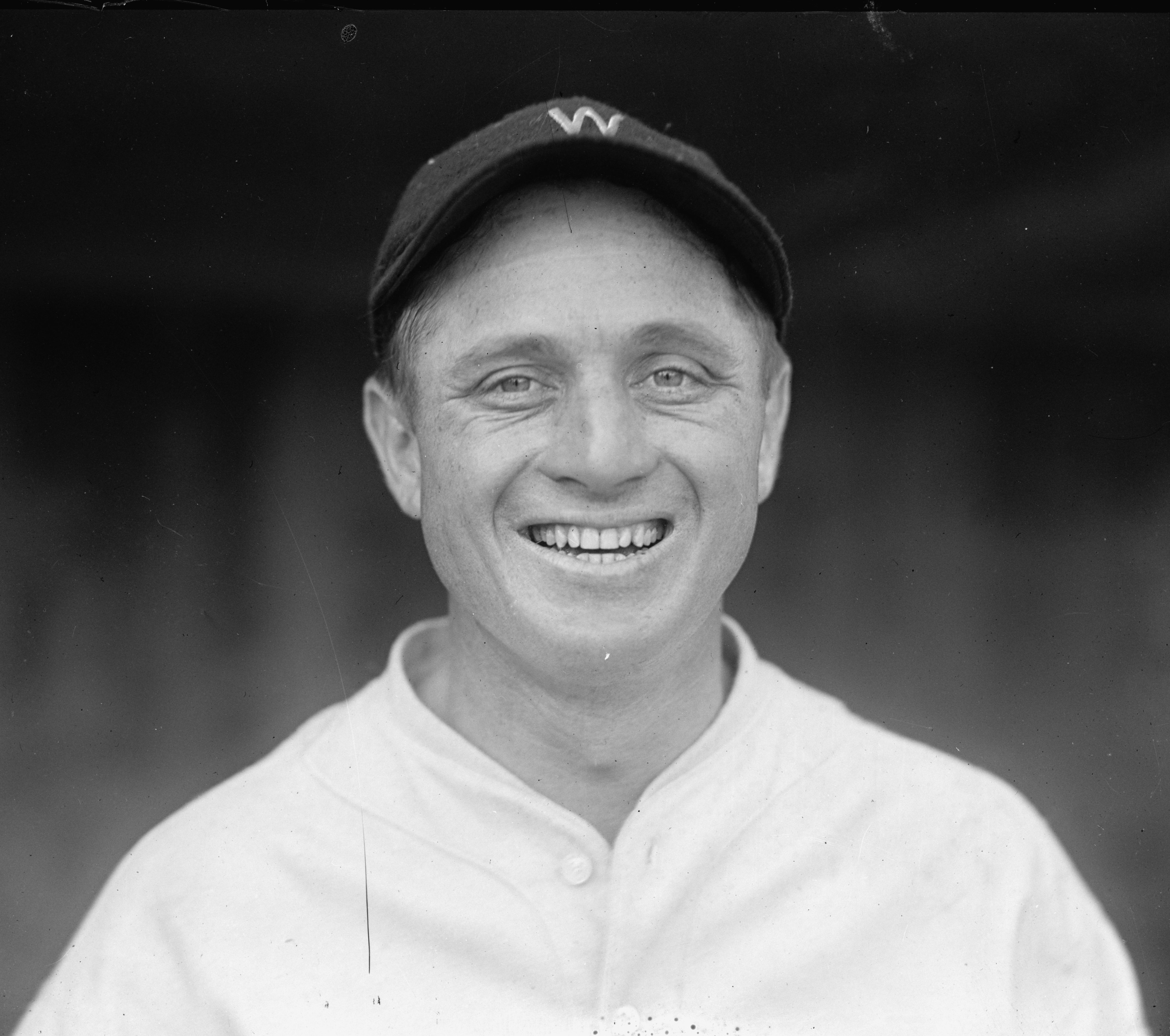
- Outfielder
- Born: October 20, 1896; Raleigh, Illinois, U.S.
- Died: October 5, 1965 (aged 68); Hollywood, California, U.S.
- Batted: Left Threw: Left

MLB debut
- April 16, 1923, for the Philadelphia Athletics

Last MLB appearance
- June 7, 1925, for the Washington Senators

MLB statistics
- Batting average: .284
- Home runs: 1
- Runs batted in: 39
- Stats at Baseball Reference

Teams
- Philadelphia Athletics (1923); Washington Senators (1924–1925)

Wid Curry Matthews (October 20, 1896 – October 5, 1965) was an American outfielder, scout and front office executive in Major League Baseball. Matthews served as general manager of the Chicago Cubs for seven full seasons and became one of the first front-office employees in the history of the New York Mets in 1961, the year before they began play in the National League. A native of Raleigh, Illinois, Matthews stood 5 ft, 8 1/2 in (174 cm) tall and weighed 155 pounds (70 kg) in his playing days. He threw and batted left-handed.

== Playing career ==
After playing in the highest level of the minor leagues — the American Association and the International and Pacific Coast leagues — Matthews made the major leagues for 2 1/2 seasons (1923–midseason 1925) for the Philadelphia Athletics and Washington Senators, batting .284 with 188 hits, 21 doubles, ten triples, one home run and 39 runs batted in in 192 games played. Sent by Washington to Sacramento of the Pacific Coast League after 53 games played in 1924, Matthews did not appear in the 1924 World Series, won by the Senators in seven games.

== Scout/front office career ==
Matthews' career as a scout and general manager began in 1936, when he joined the St. Louis Cardinals, the pioneers of the MLB farm system. Seven years later, he moved with Redbird GM Branch Rickey to the Brooklyn Dodgers, where he served as the Dodgers' director of Midwest scouting through the 1949 season. As Brooklyn's top scout in the Midwest, Matthews was one of multiple Dodger evaluators who followed Jackie Robinson of the Kansas City Monarchs of the Negro leagues in 1945. His glowing assessment of Robinson's ability to "protect the strike zone" was key to Rickey's decision to target Robinson as the first African-American to break the baseball color line that had been in force since the 1880s.

On February 14, 1950, Matthews became "director of player personnel" and de facto general manager of the Cubs. The Cubs had just begun a long skein of losing seasons, finishing in the NL's second division for 20 consecutive years (1947–66), and compiling an over-.500 record only in 1963. During his seven seasons (1950–56) as the top baseball official in the Chicago front office, Matthews was able to break the Cubs' color line, signing Ernie Banks as the team's first African-American player. However, plagued by a poor farm system and not aggressive enough in the signing of other black and Latin talent, the Cubs could not escape the NL's second division during Matthews' reign.

After his dismissal by the Cubs, Matthews joined the front office of the Milwaukee Braves, then one of the National League's dominant teams. He held the identical title he did with Chicago, but in his new post he served as assistant GM to John J. Quinn, the Braves' incumbent general manager. In January of 1961, Matthews became a scout for the Mets, newly admitted to the National League as a 1962 expansion team. He was promoted, along with Johnny Murphy, to the post of top aide to club president George Weiss in November of that year.

Matthews resigned as the Mets' director of player personnel during the 1964 season. His last job in baseball was as a scout for the Los Angeles/California Angels. He died in a West Hollywood, California, hotel at the age of 68 during the Angels' end-of-year organizational meetings.

== Sources ==
- Career statistics from Baseball Reference
