= Clearwave Communications =

US regional telephone company

Clearwave Communications, Inc, LLC, is a facilities-based competitive local exchange carrier (CLEC) headquartered in Harrisburg, Illinois; offering voice and data services in Southern Illinois.

== History ==
In business since 1996, Clearwave Communications offers a package of telecommunications services for business and residential users, including voice solutions, high-speed data and Internet access and Internet services.

With Corporate Headquarters in Harrisburg, Illinois., Clearwave Communications is a facilities-based service provider that owns and manages its own network equipment. In addition to a line of voice and data services, a number of other products and services are offered.

In November 2015 Clearwave launched a new pay-per-view streaming service, which customers can use on demand. This will be entitled World Nation Live Entertainment.
