= Green B. Raum =

US Army general, author, and Congressman (1829–1909)

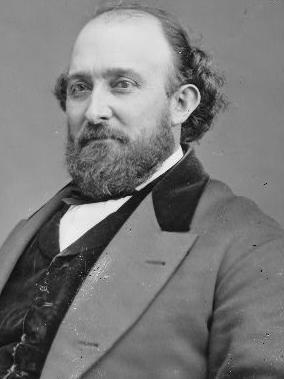
- Raum, 1860–1875

9th Commissioner of Internal Revenue
- In office August 2, 1876 – April 30, 1883
- President: Ulysses S. Grant; Rutherford B. Hayes; James A. Garfield; Chester A. Arthur
- Preceded by: Daniel D. Pratt
- Succeeded by: Walter Evans

Member of the U.S. House of Representatives from Illinois's 13th district
- In office March 4, 1867 – March 3, 1869
- Preceded by: Andrew J. Kuykendall
- Succeeded by: John M. Crebs

Personal details
- Born: Green Berry Raum; December 3, 1829 Golconda, Illinois, US
- Died: December 18, 1909 (aged 80) Chicago, Illinois, US
- Resting place: Arlington National Cemetery
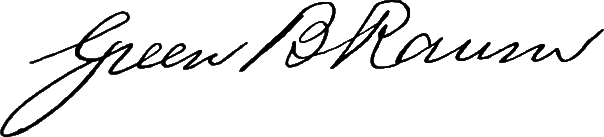
- Signature

Military service
- Allegiance: United States of America; Union
- Branch/service: United States Army; Union Army
- Years of service: 1861–1865
- Rank: Brigadier General
- Unit: Army of the Tennessee
- Commands: 2nd Brigade, 2nd Division, XVII Corps; 2nd Brigade, 3rd Division, XV Corps
- Battles/wars: American Civil War: Siege of Corinth; Vicksburg Campaign; Third Battle of Chattanooga; Battle of Missionary Ridge; Atlanta campaign; Carolina Campaign

Green Berry Raum (December 3, 1829 – December 18, 1909) was a lawyer, author, and U.S. Representative from Illinois, as well as a brigadier general in the Union Army during the American Civil War. He served in the Western Theater, seeing action in several major battles while leading first an infantry regiment and then a brigade. He also presided over the Internal Revenue Service for seven years and was a prolific author of historical non-fiction books concerning politics and general Illinois history.

== Early life and career ==
Born in Golconda, Illinois, Raum attended the common schools. He later studied law. He was admitted to the bar in 1853 and practiced in Golconda 1853–1856. He moved to Kansas in 1856 and practiced his profession for two years. He then returned to Illinois and settled in Harrisburg.

== Civil War service ==
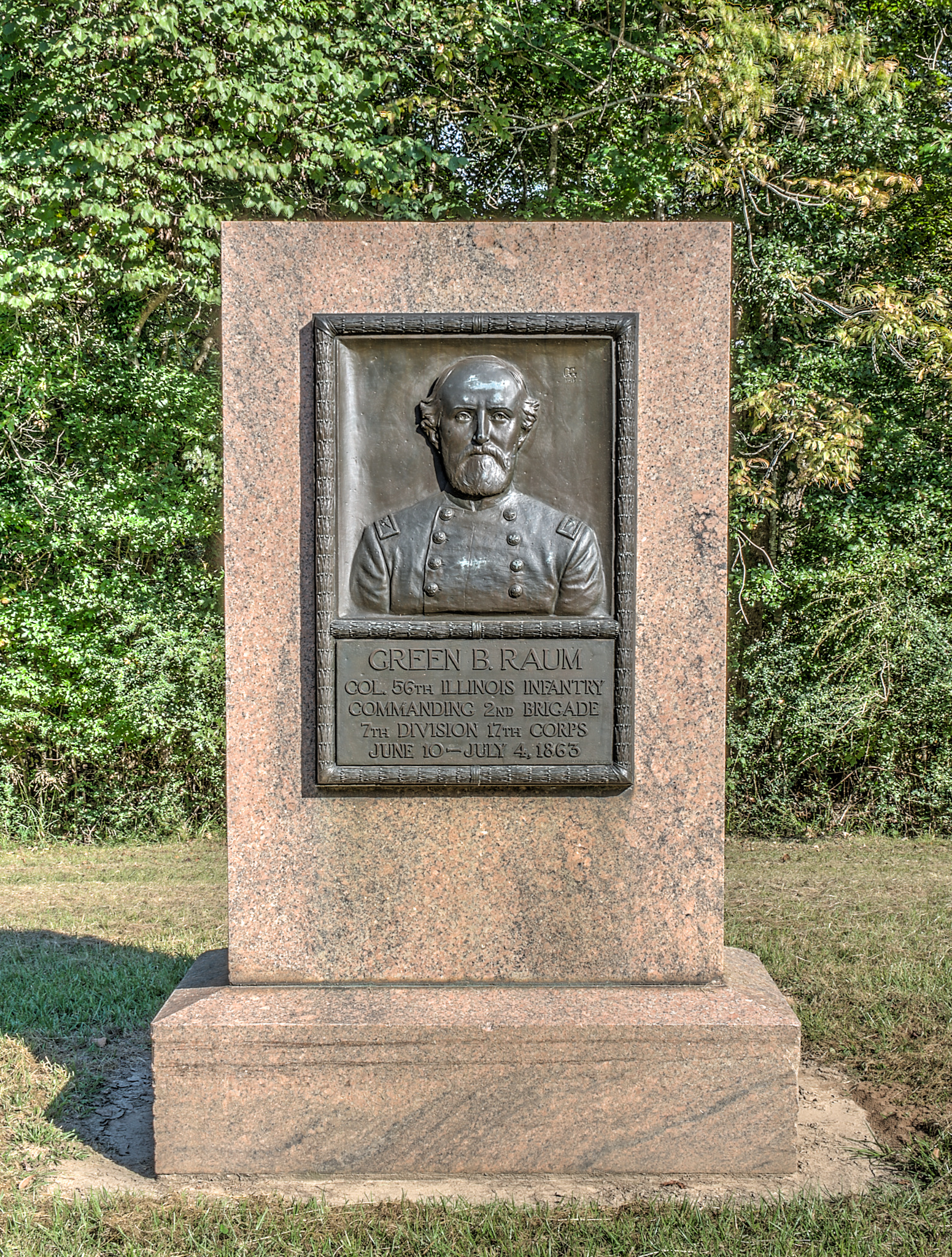
Relief portrait of Raum by George Ganiere at Vicksburg National Military Park

Following the outbreak of the Civil War, Raum enlisted in September 1861 in the Union Army as the major of the 56th Illinois Infantry, and rose to its colonelcy in 1862. He and his regiment served under Maj. Gen. William S. Rosecrans during the 1862 Siege of Corinth, Mississippi. There, he ordered and led the charge that broke the Confederate left and captured an artillery battery. In 1863, he was part of the army of Ulysses S. Grant that invested and forced the surrender of Vicksburg, Mississippi. He led the 2nd Brigade, 2nd Division, XVII Corps during the Chattanooga Campaign, and was wounded at the Battle of Missionary Ridge in November 1863.

During the 1864 Atlanta campaign, Raum's brigade held the line of communication from Dalton to Acworth and from Kingston to Rome. He was brevetted as a brigadier general of volunteers on September 19, 1864. In October of that year, he reinforced Resaca, Georgia, and held it against General John B. Hood. Raum was promoted to the full rank brigadier general on February 15, 1865, and served through the end of the hostilities. He led the 2nd Brigade, 3rd Division, XV Corps during the Carolinas campaign in early 1865.

== Postbellum career ==
Raum resigned his commission on May 6, 1865, and returned home to Illinois. In 1866 he obtained a charter for the Cairo and Vincennes Railroad Company, aided in securing its construction, and became its first president. He was elected as a Republican to the Fortieth Congress (March 4, 1867 – March 3, 1869). He was an unsuccessful candidate for reelection in 1868 to the Forty-first Congress.

He then served as United States Commissioner of Internal Revenue from 1876 to 1883. He was acting chairman of the 1880 Republican National Convention in Chicago, Illinois. As United States Commissioner of Pensions from 1889 to 1893, he was responsible for overseeing the acceptance or rejection of pension applications for thousands of Civil War veterans. He engaged in the practice of law in Chicago until his death there on December 18, 1909. He and his wife Maria Field (1831–1915) are buried in Arlington National Cemetery in Arlington, Virginia.

== Books and publications written by Raum ==
- The Existing Conflict between Republican Government and Southern Oligarchy. 1884. Reprint, New York: Negro Universities Press, 1969.
- "Finance and Labor and the Great Danger of the Hour": Speech Delivered by Hon. Green B. Raum, Commissioner of Internal Revenue, at Peoria, Illinois, October 12, 1878. Washington, D.C.: National Republican Publishing Co., 1878.
- History of Illinois Republicanism. Chicago: Rollins Publishing Company, 1900.
- "National Development". Speech of Hon. Green B. Raum, Delivered in the House of Representatives, July 13, 1868. Washington: Chronicle Print, 1868.
- Twenty Years of Republican Rule. Washington, D.C.: National Republican print., 1882.

== See also ==
- List of American Civil War generals (Union)

U.S. House of Representatives
Preceded by Andrew J. Kuykendall	Member of the U.S. House of Representatives from Illinois's 13th congressional district March 4, 1867 – March 3, 1869	Succeeded by John M. Crebs
Government offices
Preceded by Daniel D. Pratt	Commissioner of Internal Revenue; August 2, 1876 – April 30, 1883	Succeeded by Walter Evans
