= H. B. Tanner =

American businessman and politician (1922–2020)

H. B. Tanner (March 16, 1922 – March 12, 2020) was an American businessman and politician.

== Biography ==
Hugh Bernard Tanner was born on March 16, 1922, in Carrier Mills, Illinois. He graduated from the Eldorado Township High School in Eldorado, Illinois. Tanner also graduated from the College of Mortuary Science in St. Louis, Missouri. He served in the United States Army during World War II and the Korean War. He lived in Harrisburg, Illinois with his wife and family. Tanner owned a funeral home in Eldorado, Illinois. He was also in the construction and real estate businesses. Tanner served as sheriff of Saline County, from 1958 to 1962, and was a Democrat. Tahher served in the Illinois House of Representatives in 1965 and 1966. Tanner died on March 12, 2020, aged 97, at the VA Medical Center in Marion, Illinois.
