= Harco, Illinois =

Unincorporated community in Saline County, Illinois

- Unincorporated community
- Location within Illinois Location within the United States
- Coordinates: 37°47′45″N 88°39′00″W
- Country: United States
- State: Illinois
- Time zone: UTC-6 (Central (CST))
  - Summer (DST): UTC-5 (CDT)

Harco is an unincorporated community in Saline County, Illinois, United States. The Harrisburg Colliery Coal Company Mine was sunk in November 1916, in the center of section 27, township 8, range 5, Saline County, Illinois, and the town of Harco soon grew up around it. The name of the town is derived from the first three letters of Harrisburg and the first two letters of Colliery, spelling “Harco.”

The Harrisburg Colliery Company was organized by J. H. Kilmer of Chicago, and Ed Qualkenbush, D. K. Seten, and O. D. Norman, of Harrisburg, Illinois. D. K. Seten was a grocer and O. D. Norman, his brother-in-law, was the husband of Mrs. Hattie Norman and the father of Mrs. Mary Lindsay, of Harrisburg.

== History ==
=== Mining ===
Harco was founded based on discovery of coal. The first coal was hoisted January 6, 1918. In later years, it was known as the Saline County Coal Corporation, and later as the Peabody Coal Company Mine No. 47. Harco was plotted June 24, 1919, with the plate showing 121 lots 50 by 140 feet (43 m).

It is listed that 134 men died in accidents at the Harco mines, Peabody no. 47, and west of Harco, Peabody no. 40. There were 11 killed in an explosion August 31, 1921 and 8 killed in an explosion December 28, 1941. Harco mine was closed April 25, 1951, but the coal washer continued to process coal until 1954. The mine was then dismantled.

To accommodate its workers, the coal company built four-room houses on the east side of town and five- and six-room houses on the south side. The houses were prefabricated Sears Catalog Homes shipped by railroad to the mine and then delivered to the building sites by wagon. Some of the families were living in tents and were so anxious to move in that they did so before the doorknobs were placed on the doors.

When the Harco mine closed in April 1951, families living in the company houses were given evacuation notices. The houses were offered for sale at $50 a room, and several of the houses were moved intact. Some of the empty houses burned, and rest were torn down, for the land was not sold with the houses.

=== Facilities ===
The Harco post office was established on November 21, 1917, and Thomas Hoffman was its first postmaster. In later years, Lois C. Naugle was postmaster for twenty years, with the post office housed inside Naugle's general store.

There was a one-room school known as 'Vinyard School'. A larger framed two-room school was built and ready in the fall of 1917. Several years later it burned down, and a large two-story brick five-room school building was built.

J. Ogden opened the first store in the village. There was a forty-room hotel to accommodate the miners. Other stores included the Company Store, owned and operated by C. V. Parker; a grist mill and a grocery store run by Charlie Manier and a general store. The Gibbon's Drug Store had a registered pharmacist and a soda fountain, whilst another drug store also sold patent medicines and sundries. Dr. M. D. Empson and Dr. R. G. Bond practiced medicine in Harco. Neotere “Butch” LePontre ran the local meat market. The village had a shoe store, blacksmith, and a two-chair barbershop.

There was a one-room jailhouse. For many years there was a wood-framed Baptist church in Harco and the Harco Baptist Church still exists. The Old Brushy Cemetery is nearby.

== Population ==
The present population of Harco is near 200 but in the 1920s the population was about 1,200, and the village, which was never incorporated, supported two drug stores, three groceries, two general stores, and a feed mill. The Webber interests of the Bank of Galatia operated a bank there until the end of that decade.

=== Amish settlement ===
In May 2007 a group of 60 Amish men, women and children moved from Wisconsin to Saline County, Illinois where they purchased almost 800 acres (3.2 km^{2}) of land to farm near Harco. At the junction of Harco Road and Brown Road they erected a school house that was destroyed by a derecho in 2009. In 2013 the Amish there had one church district.
