= Raleigh, Illinois =

Raleigh
- Village
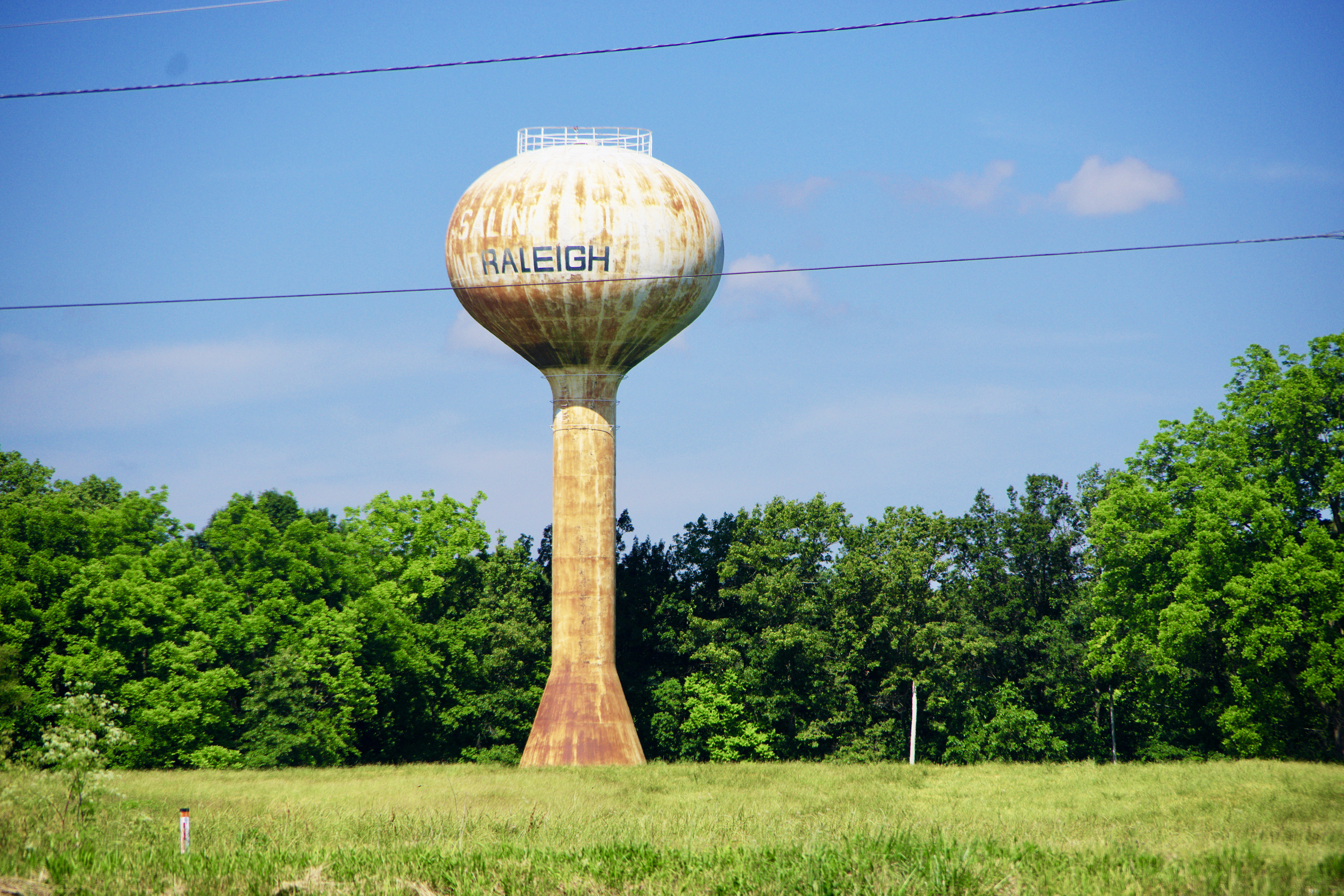
- Water tower

- Location of Raleigh in Saline County, Illinois.
- Coordinates: 37°49′34″N 88°31′49″W
- Country: United States
- State: Illinois
- County: Saline

Area
  - Total: 1.98 sq mi (5.12 km^{2})
  - Land: 1.98 sq mi (5.12 km^{2})
  - Water: 0.0039 sq mi (0.01 km^{2})
- Elevation: 400 ft (120 m)

Population (2020)
  - Total: 284
  - Density: 143.7/sq mi (55.49/km^{2})
- Time zone: UTC−6 (CST)
  - Summer (DST): UTC−5 (CDT)
- ZIP code: 62977
- Area code: 618
- FIPS code: 17-62588
- GNIS feature ID: 2399037

Raleigh is a village in Saline County, Illinois, United States. As of the 2020 census, Raleigh had a population of 284.

== History ==
The village of Raleigh was the seat of Saline County following the county's troubled creation in 1847. Raleigh had its own school, several stores, and was a bustling village. Now, along with many Saline County towns, Raleigh has been abandoned by business and commerce, leaving only 350 residents.

On October 11, 1847, at a meeting of the County Commissioners held in Curran, a location and name for a County Seat for the newly formed Saline County was established. The Musgrave family, having moved from Raleigh, North Carolina, convinced the group to name the new county seat "Raleigh". William St. C. Clark, Israel W. Crawford, and Martin Kittinger helped Archibald Sloan survey the town. George Bond, William Carr, and William Stricklin were to build a county road reaching from Raleigh to the boundary line of Saline and Williamson Counties. Raleigh Township was six square miles. When the surveying was completed, there were only three families living in Raleigh. The family of Andrew Musgrave owned 200 acres of farm ground. Mrs. (William) Crawford and Archibald Sloan were the other two occupants.

Lots in the town were sold to raise money to pay for the construction of a new county courthouse. Some of the earliest Raleigh residents were: Alfred Aldrich from Posey County, Indiana (built a log house and opened a store), John F. Ammon (station agent), John Choisser from Kaskaskia, James M. Gaston, Henry Goodrich (blacksmith), Mr. McElvain, Tom Mitchell, Osborn Powell (blacksmith).

The first courthouse was a 20' x 24' building constructed by James M. Gaston from logs. It was two stories tall. The courtroom occupied the entire first floor. The second story held two rooms and a hallway, used during court proceedings for grant or petit purposes. The courthouse was finished August 15, 1858, at a cost of $5,500.00. About 8 months after completion of the new building, a group began scheming to have the courthouse, and hence the County Seat, moved out of Raleigh.

The subject of taking the County Seat away from Raleigh was a very heated, hostile event. Arguments held that Harrisburg was a more central location. Petitions were passed around that put the issue on the ballot; a margin of 15 votes decided the fate of Raleigh. Raleigh filed suit but they never got their day in court because each time a date was set the hearing was postponed with no action every being taken and the suit was finally thrown out of court. It is rumored, and is included in the records in the Inventory of the County Archives of Illinois that some Harrisburg residents bribed the court. Accusations have been made that a group of people actually sneaked into Raleigh one night, broke into the Courthouse, stole the county records, and took them to Harrisburg. Only two families were living in Harrisburg at the time Harrisburg became the County Seat. The last County Court held in Raleigh was in June 1858.

== Geography ==
According to the 2010 census, Raleigh has a total area of 1.983 square miles (5.14 km^{2}), of which 1.98 square miles (5.13 km^{2}) (or 99.85%) is land and 0.003 square miles (0.01 km^{2}) (or 0.15%) is water.

== Demographics ==
Historical population
Census	Pop.	Note	%±
1880	245		—
1900	333		—
1910	238		−28.5%
1920	264		10.9%
1930	241		−8.7%
1940	483		100.4%
1950	262		−45.8%
1960	225		−14.1%
1970	215		−4.4%
1980	352		63.7%
1990	305		−13.4%
2000	330		8.2%
2010	350		6.1%
2020	284		−18.9%
U.S. Decennial Census

As of the census of 2000, there were 330 people, 144 households, and 94 families residing in the village. The population density was 167.1 inhabitants per square mile (64.5/km^{2}). There were 182 housing units at an average density of 92.2 per square mile (35.6/km^{2}). The racial makeup of the village was 99.39% White, 0.30% Native American and 0.30% Pacific Islander. Hispanic or Latino of any race were 0.30% of the population.

There were 144 households, out of which 31.9% had children under the age of 18 living with them, 50.7% were married couples living together, 10.4% had a female householder with no husband present, and 34.7% were non-families. 32.6% of all households were made up of individuals, and 13.9% had someone living alone who was 65 years of age or older. The average household size was 2.29 and the average family size was 2.93.

In the village, the age distribution of the population shows 25.8% under the age of 20, 8.8% from 18 to 24, 24.8% from 25 to 44, 22.1% from 45 to 64, and 18.5% who were 65 years of age or older. The median age was 38 years. For every 100 females, there were 97.6 males. For every 100 females age 18 and over, there were 76.3 males.

The median income for a household in the village was $25,000, and the median income for a family was $37,857. Males had a median income of $36,667 versus $16,071 for females. The per capita income for the village was $13,054. About 21.8% of families and 29.4% of the population were below the poverty line, including 39.4% of those under age 18 and 11.6% of those age 65 or over.

== Notable people ==
- Todd Duffee, Mixed martial arts fighter
- Wid Matthews, outfielder with the Philadelphia Athletics and Washington Senators
