= The Daily Register =

American daily newspaper in Illinois

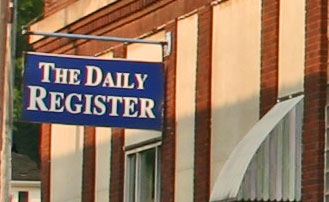
- Type: Daily newspaper
- Owner: Paddock Publications
- Editor: John Homan
- Founded: 1915
- Ceased publication: 2026
- Headquarters: 617 E Church Street, Harrisburg, Illinois 62946, United States
- Website: dailyregister.com

The Daily Register and The Eldorado Daily Journal were sister daily newspapers published in Harrisburg, Illinois, United States. They were owned by Paddock Publications, and managed locally by Southern Illinois Media Group (SILMG). Both papers covered sections of Saline County, Illinois, including Carrier Mills, Eldorado, Harrisburg and Stonefort. They shared an office and staff based in Harrisburg.

== History ==
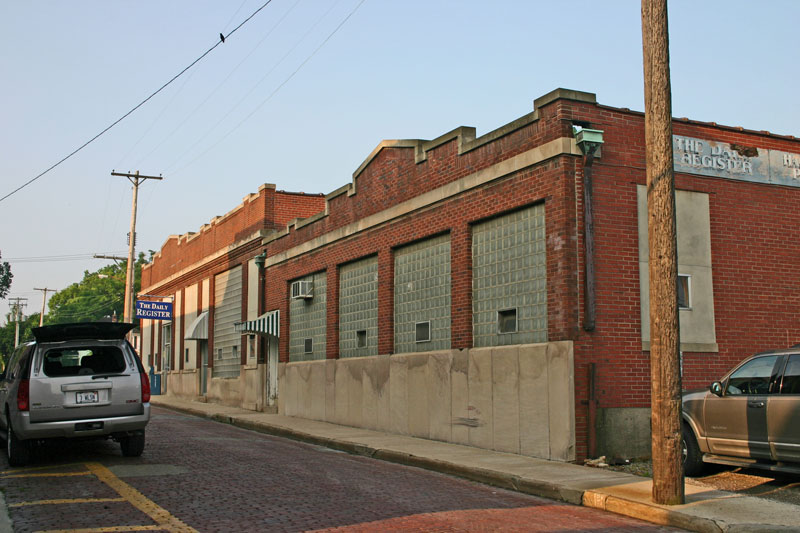
The Daily Register office, 2007

The Register was founded in 1915. In 1922, Roy L. Seright and his wife, Daisy, of Louisville, Kentucky purchased the paper, after being persuaded by local businessmen. After Roy died in 1931, Daisy took over as publisher, but left the day-to-day operations to a man named Curtis Small. Small was general manager until his death in 1980. At that time, Curtis’ son, Roy, assumed his duties with the newspaper. In May 1987, Daisy's grandson, Roy M. Seright, replaced her as chairman and publisher.

According to the Library of Congress, beginning in the 1800s (exact year unknown) Eldorado had a newspaper named the Saline County Republican, published by an A.I. Mallory. This paper ceased publication in 1918. The Eldorado Journal began as a weekly publication in 1911, with a publisher named Col.Lindolph Oscar "L.O." Trigg. According to Trigg's granddaughter, he founded the newspaper on a gamble, thinking the county seat would be located in Eldorado. The name was revised in 1921 to Eldorado Daily Journal, and publication moved to weekly. Trigg's son, Kenneth Robert “K.R.” Trigg, ran the newspaper until 1976, when he sold it to the American Publishing Company. Until the late 1980s it was located on Locust Street in Eldorado. It is now published at the Harrisburg Daily Register office, and circulated to Eldorado residents.

In 1987, the papers were acquired by Hollinger. GateHouse Media purchased roughly 160 daily and weekly newspapers from Hollinger in 1997, including the Register and Journal. In August 2016, Gatehouse sold the newspapers to Paddock Publications based in Arlington Heights, Illinois.

While the Daily Register was published six days a week for most of its lifetime, it is now published three days a week, by mail subscription.

In 2026, at least 13 papers owned by Paddock ceased, including the Daily Register.
