= List of tornadoes in the outbreak of May 15–16, 2025 =

A major tornado outbreak occurred within the Ohio Valley from May 15–16, 2025, spawning multiple destructive and damaging tornadoes.

== Confirmed tornadoes ==
Date	Total	EFU	EF0	EF1	EF2	EF3	EF4	EF5	Deaths	Injuries
May 15	31	4	11	12	4	0	0	0	0	1
May 16	31	0	5	14	7	3	2	0	26	170
Total	62	4	16	26	11	3	2	0	26	171

=== May 15 event ===
List of confirmed tornadoes – Thursday, May 15, 2025 (Note: All dates are based on the local time zone where the tornado touched down; however, all times are in Coordinated Universal Time for consistency.)
EF#	Location	County / parish	State	Start coord.	Time (UTC)	Path length	Max. width
EF0	NW of Gracelock to ESE of Big Bend City	Chippewa	MN	45.086°N 95.709°W	18:05–18:14	4.02 mi (6.47 km)	25 yd (23 m)
EF0	A weak tornado moved across a farm and some groves of trees, but minimal damage was noted.						
EF0	NW of Danvers	Swift	MN	45.303°N 95.798°W	18:28–18:29	0.52 mi (0.84 km)	40 yd (37 m)
EF0	A few large tree branches were downed.						
EF1	SE of Benson	Swift	MN	45.274°N 95.575°W	18:34–18:38	2.66 mi (4.28 km)	50 yd (46 m)
EF1	An outbuilding was heavily damaged, and trees were uprooted.						
EF0	N of Lake Henry to S of New Munich	Stearns	MN	45.525°N 94.776°W	19:43–19:48	2.77 mi (4.46 km)	50 yd (46 m)
EF0	Tree branches were snapped.						
EFU	NW of Amenia	Cass	ND	47.018°N 97.236°W	20:08–20:09	0.1 mi (0.16 km)	20 yd (18 m)
EFU	A brief tornado lofted some debris. No damage occurred.						
EF2	NE of Roberts to S of Erin Corner	St. Croix	WI	45.0201°N 92.4901°W	20:26–20:34	3.94 mi (6.34 km)	120 yd (110 m)
EF2	This strong tornado began by uprooting multiple trees near a property, then tracked north, snapping tree trunks along its path. As it shifted northeast, it destroyed a farm outbuilding, scattering debris along the rest of its track. The most significant damage occurred at a property where multiple trees were snapped and a silo was heavily damaged, including a caved-in side, a shifted base, and the top being removed. The tornado continued briefly before dissipating north of a nearby road.						
EF0	SSW of Rock Springs	Sauk	WI	43.4307°N 89.9453°W	21:05–21:06	0.08 mi (0.13 km)	20 yd (18 m)
EF0	Some tree branches were broken.						
EF0	SW of Wanchese	Dare	NC	35.8457°N 75.65°W	21:22–21:24	0.82 mi (1.32 km)	100 yd (91 m)
EF0	A brief, weak tornado on Roanoke Island caused scattered damage, including uprooted and snapped trees, tossed bleachers, shingle loss on a concessions building, and overturned outdoor equipment.						
EFU	NE of Hensel	Pembina	ND	48.71°N 97.62°W	21:28–21:29	0.1 mi (0.16 km)	20 yd (18 m)
EFU	A weak, uncondensed tornado was recorded. No known damage occurred.						
EFU	SW of Portage	Columbia	WI	43.5175°N 89.5009°W	21:42–21:43	1.18 mi (1.90 km)	20 yd (18 m)
EFU	Several people reported and recorded a tornado, but no damage was found.						
EF1	S of Christie	Clark	WI	44.62°N 90.6°W	21:47–21:48	0.85 mi (1.37 km)	100 yd (91 m)
EF1	A few large trees were snapped.						
EF0	NE of Christie to SSW of Loyal	Clark	WI	44.67°N 90.56°W	21:55–21:58	2.4 mi (3.9 km)	75 yd (69 m)
EF0	Trees were damaged, and a portion of a barn's roof was removed.						
EF1	E of Loyal	Clark	WI	44.72°N 90.49°W	22:08–22:12	2.4 mi (3.9 km)	100 yd (91 m)
EF1	A residence, trees, and powerlines were damaged.						
EFU	E of Crookston	Polk	MN	47.787°N 96.528°W	22:09–22:10	0.1 mi (0.16 km)	10 yd (9.1 m)
EFU	A dusty circulation with no funnel cloud was recorded crossing a road.						
EF2	W of Unity to Southeastern Colby	Clark, Marathon	WI	44.85°N 90.356°W	22:21–22:28	4.63 mi (7.45 km)	230 yd (210 m)
EF2	A strong tornado damaged farm outbuildings, trees, power poles, and a house had the majority of its roof removed. The tornado then passed through the southeastern part of Colby, damaging a house, several outbuildings, power poles, and a car dealership before dissipating east of the town.						
EF1	E of Astico to SW of Juneau	Dodge	WI	43.3276°N 88.861°W	22:32–22:42	6.62 mi (10.65 km)	100 yd (91 m)
EF1	Tree damage occurred.						
EF2	ESE of Leipsig to Northern Juneau to E of Horicon	Dodge	WI	43.377°N 88.7766°W	22:38–22:56	11.48 mi (18.48 km)	500 yd (460 m)
EF2	A strong tornado caused extensive damage along its path from southwest of Juneau, through the north side of downtown, and ending east of Horicon. The most intense destruction occurred in Juneau, where around ten structures experienced EF2-level damage. One person was injured when a roof was torn off and a tree crashed into their home. A care facility had windows blown out and lost the roof of one building, while a motel-style residential structure also lost its entire roof. An empty silo was buckled, and a cow was injured by flying debris. At a golf club near Horicon, approximately 165 trees were uprooted or heavily damaged, several golf carts were overturned or displaced, and the main building suffered major roof damage.						
EF0	NW of Rib Falls	Marathon	WI	44.963°N 89.92°W	22:41–22:50	2.5 mi (4.0 km)	65 yd (59 m)
EF0	Two outbuildings and some trees were damaged.						
EF1	N of Juneau to Southern Horicon	Dodge	WI	43.4323°N 88.7024°W	22:48–22:52	4.21 mi (6.78 km)	75 yd (69 m)
EF1	A tornado began on the north end of the Dodge County Airport, heavily damaging five airplane hangars by tearing off roofing and siding. All planes at the site were destroyed either by debris impact or by being flipped. The tornado then moved east and passed through the far southern edge of Horicon, causing additional damage near a park.						
EF0	W of Bancroft	Portage	WI	44.2547°N 89.6064°W	22:52–23:03	5.21 mi (8.38 km)	45 yd (41 m)
EF0	Trees were downed across a road.						
EF2	NE of Horicon to Mayville to NW of Theresa Station	Dodge	WI	43.4813°N 88.5983°W	22:57–23:08	8.28 mi (13.33 km)	300 yd (270 m)
EF2	This strong tornado began southwest of Mayville and quickly intensified as it moved into the southwestern part of town. A farmhouse lost part of its roof, and several farm sheds were damaged. In the industrial area, the Mayville Engineering Company sustained major damage when winds entered through a large garage door and caused the collapse of a north wall. The nearby Gleason Reel Corporation also suffered heavy damage, with the southern portion of the building destroyed. The tornado then moved through a neighborhood, causing further damage before crossing the town's main street and the East Branch Rock River. It continued through the eastern side of Mayville, damaging areas near the golf course, then moved northeast through rural areas, damaging trees, homes, and outbuildings before dissipating after passing just to the west of Theresa Station.						
EF1	N of Theresa Station	Dodge	WI	43.5392°N 88.4414°W	23:08–23:11	2.1 mi (3.4 km)	50 yd (46 m)
EF1	A tornado crossed I-41/US 41, damaging nearby trees.						
EF1	SW of Lomira	Dodge	WI	43.5606°N 88.479°W	23:09–23:10	1.5 mi (2.4 km)	50 yd (46 m)
EF1	A barn was destroyed.						
EF0	ESE of Zeeland to S of Hudsonville	Ottawa	MI	42.79°N 85.95°W	02:24–02:28	3.5 mi (5.6 km)	50 yd (46 m)
EF0	Multiple farm buildings and trees were damaged.						
EF1	SSE of Burnips to Southern Dorr	Allegan	MI	42.69°N 85.82°W	02:28–02:33	5.4 mi (8.7 km)	175 yd (160 m)
EF1	Numerous trees were snapped and/or uprooted.						
EF1	Martin	Allegan	MI	42.52°N 85.7°W	02:41–02:49	8.3 mi (13.4 km)	200 yd (180 m)
EF1	This tornado began by toppling a power pole, then caused significant damage at a campground near Schnable Lake, flipping trailers and damaging roofs with falling trees. It continued through Martin, where it inflicted its most severe structural damage before weakening and dissipating near the Allegan/Barry county line.						
EF1	ENE of Martin to SW of Hastings	Barry	MI	42.58°N 85.51°W	02:50–03:00	6.75 mi (10.86 km)	200 yd (180 m)
EF1	This tornado caused primarily tree damage, with several homes experiencing minor roof damage or being struck by falling trees. Multiple docks on Gun Lake were heavily damaged, including one with several sections torn off and thrown far into the water.						
EF1	NE of Caledonia to S of Saranac	Kent, Ionia	MI	42.8°N 85.47°W	02:51–03:08	14.5 mi (23.3 km)	100 yd (91 m)
EF1	A couple of houses sustained roof damage near Campbell Lake and tree damage occurred throughout the path.						
EF0	Galesburg to Battle Creek	Kalamazoo, Calhoun	MI	42.2951°N 85.407°W	02:59–03:11	10 mi (16 km)	200 yd (180 m)
EF0	Numerous structures had minor damage; others were damaged by falling trees. Tree damage was the main occurrence throughout this weak tornado's path.						
EF0	E of Level Park-Oak Park to S of Bellevue	Calhoun	MI	42.38°N 85.2°W	03:11–03:18	8.5 mi (13.7 km)	200 yd (180 m)
EF0	Multiple trees were damaged.						
EF1	NW of Charlotte to Lansing	Eaton, Ingham	MI	42.6°N 84.86°W	03:25–03:39	15.5 mi (24.9 km)	250 yd (230 m)
EF1	The storm removed parts of several houses' roofs, heavily damaged several outbuildings, and damaged warehouse buildings.						

=== May 16 event ===
List of confirmed tornadoes – Friday, May 16, 2025
EF#	Location	County / parish	State	Start coord.	Time (UTC)	Path length	Max. width
EF1	E of Stockbridge to W of Gregory	Livingston	MI	42.4541°N 84.1372°W	04:03–04:05	1.9 mi (3.1 km)	230 yd (210 m)
EF1	A tornado touched down north of M-106, uprooting a few trees and snapping large tree limbs. It damaged a shed roof near the highway, then moved northeast where it damaged more tree limbs and three roofs at a dairy farm. The tornado continued east-northeast, snapping hardwood trees before ending near the Lakeland Trail.						
EF0	Northern St. Charles	Saginaw	MI	43.297°N 84.1702°W	04:05–04:10	1.62 mi (2.61 km)	250 yd (230 m)
EF0	This tornado caused extensive tree damage along its path. It began southwest of a golf club, crossed the Bad River and into a park, then dissipated near a neighborhood north of the park.						
EF0	SE of Chesaning to N of New Lothrop	Saginaw	MI	43.1476°N 84.0511°W	04:11–04:14	3.36 mi (5.41 km)	160 yd (150 m)
EF0	This tornado began by damaging a couple of barns, blowing a garage off its foundation, and blowing out the door and wall of another garage. Several trees were uprooted and large limbs were snapped in the same area. As it continued, additional damage occurred to two more barns with roof damage, another garage with structural failure, and widespread tree damage including uproots and snapped limbs.						
EF0	NE of Atlas to N of Goodrich	Genesee	MI	42.9643°N 83.5289°W	04:35–04:38	1.24 mi (2.00 km)	100 yd (91 m)
EF0	A tornado damaged some trees.						
EF1	E of Bay to WNW of Caraway	Craighead	AR	35.7392°N 90.4925°W	12:46–12:53	7.11 mi (11.44 km)	150 yd (140 m)
EF1	A center-pivot irrigation system was overturned, several power poles were snapped, an outbuilding and a house had their roofs damaged, and minor tree damage occurred.						
EF1	Victory Lakes to Collings Lakes	Gloucester, Atlantic	NJ	39.65°N 75.01°W	16:42–16:53	8.09 mi (13.02 km)	300 yd (270 m)
EF1	This tornado uprooted a large hardwood tree and peeled siding from a home right when it formed. It intensified as it moved south-southeast, snapping several hardwood trees at their trunks. The tornado then followed a discontinuous southeast path, damaging a wood fence and tree branches near a residential area. It snapped a telephone pole before continuing into Collings Lakes, where it downed large branches, peeled metal roof sheeting from an outbuilding, and caused scattered tree damage before dissipating.						
EF1	ESE of Elk Creek to NNW of Clear Springs	Texas	MO	37.16°N 91.91°W	18:25–18:29	2.41 mi (3.88 km)	100 yd (91 m)
EF1	Numerous trees were uprooted or damaged.						
EF0	NW of Old Concord	Washington	PA	40.0144°N 80.359°W	18:52–18:53	0.51 mi (0.82 km)	75 yd (69 m)
EF0	A weak tornado downed several trees.						
EF3	Clayton, MO to northwestern St. Louis, MO to northern Granite City, IL	St. Louis (MO), City of St. Louis (MO), Madison (IL)	MO, IL	38.644°N 90.3468°W	19:39–19:53	12.29 mi (19.78 km)	3,168 yd (2,897 m)
EF3	4 deaths – See article on this tornado – At least 38 people were injured.						
EF1	Granite City to SW of Edwardsville	Madison	IL	38.703°N 90.153°W	19:50–20:05	11.64 mi (18.73 km)	
EF1	This tornado began as the St. Louis tornado was dissipating. It sporadically reached EF1 intensity before dissipating near Edwardsville.						
EF2	Des Arc	Iron	MO	37.275°N 90.6608°W	19:53–19:56	3.26 mi (5.25 km)	150 yd (140 m)
EF2	This strong tornado touched down along Route 49 near the Iron-Wayne county line and tracked northeast into Des Arc, causing minor damage to homes along the highway. It reached its peak intensity within Des Arc before weakening and dissipating just north of Route 143. This was the second tornado to strike Des Arc in 2025 with the first one being an EF3 tornado that moved along the same path through the town on March 14.						
EF3	Shawan to Crowder to SW of Porter	Stoddard, Scott	MO	36.9644°N 89.7786°W	20:54–21:15	16.1 mi (25.9 km)	200 yd (180 m)
EF3	2 deaths – See section on this tornado – Ten people were injured.						
EF0	W of Crowder	Scott	MO	36.96°N 89.72°W	20:59–21:01	0.64 mi (1.03 km)	100 yd (91 m)
EF0	A weak satellite tornado to the 2054 UTC EF3 tornado overturned an irrigation pivot and downed small tree limbs.						
EF2	E of Bufordville to WSW of Jackson	Cape Girardeau	MO	37.3649°N 89.7828°W	21:03–21:05	1.39 mi (2.24 km)	225 yd (206 m)
EF2	This strong tornado touched down east of Burfordville, majorly damaging the roof of a home. Further along its path, an outbuilding was heavily damaged and a mobile home was minorly damaged. Several trees were also uprooted along the track.						
EF1	Baltimore to Dundalk	City of Baltimore, Baltimore	MD	39.2796°N 76.6096°W	21:51–22:01	4.34 mi (6.98 km)	75 yd (69 m)
EF1	A high-end EF1 tornado touched down in Federal Hill Park in Baltimore where several trees were uprooted and large branches were snapped in a linear path toward the Patapsco River. It crossed the river and continued into Canton Waterfront Park, leaving a path of downed trees and branches through the shoreline area. In the Canton Crossing mall area, the tornado damaged a fitness facility by punching a hole in the wall, lifting part of the roof, and blowing it east-southeast. It then tracked east-southeast toward Dundalk, crossing I-895 and I-95 before hitting the Holabird Industrial Park where several warehouses suffered structural damage—mainly from wind entering large garage doors and lifting roofs. A metal and wood awning was damaged and two tractor-trailers were overturned at an Amazon facility where some debris was blown north. In northern Dundalk, the tornado caused major roof and siding damage to homes and apartments, including a large roof section torn from one row of apartments and thrown into another. Further east, a residential area west of MD 157 experienced extensive structural and tree damage, including snapped tree limbs and a home's roof being lofted onto a nearby roadway. The tornado continued into neighborhoods east of MD 157, where tree and utility pole damage was observed before dissipating near Stansbury Park.						
EF2	SE of Dugger to SSE of Worthington	Greene	IN	39.0455°N 87.2264°W	22:44–23:06	14.04 mi (22.60 km)	200 yd (180 m)
EF2	1 death – See section on this tornado – Three people were injured.						
EF1	SSE of Rhodesdale, MD to Northern Galestown, MD to S of Bethel, DE	Dorchester (MD), Sussex (DE)	MD, DE	38.55°N 75.83°W	22:52–23:06	11.3 mi (18.2 km)	600 yd (550 m)
EF1	A high-end EF1 tornado began near Rhodesdale, snapping and uprooting many trees with a clear convergent pattern. It briefly weakened before regaining strength, causing more tree damage and lifting a farm building off its foundation in the Galestown area, where the tornado reached its peak width and intensity. As it entered Delaware, it continued to snap and twist trees in multiple areas, including a park and residential neighborhood. The tornado eventually dissipated near Broad Creek.						
EF1	S of Confederate	Lyon	KY	36.9532°N 87.9972°W	22:54–22:56	0.83 mi (1.34 km)	210 yd (190 m)
EF1	Several trees were uprooted along KY 274, one farm outbuilding was destroyed and a house suffered roof damage.						
EF4	SSW of Crainville to Northern Hudgens to NNE of Creal Springs	Williamson	IL	37.6553°N 89.0945°W	23:15–23:32	16.28 mi (26.20 km)	900 yd (820 m)
EF4	See section on this tornado – 7 people were injured.						
EF1	NE of Bloomfield	Greene	IN	39.0829°N 86.8565°W	23:15–23:19	1.82 mi (2.93 km)	100 yd (91 m)
EF1	Widespread tree damage was observed using high-resolution satellite imagery, confirming this tornado.						
EF2	Elwren to Clear Creek to Grandview Lake	Monroe, Brown, Bartholomew	IN	39.106°N 86.6783°W	23:27–00:11	35.27 mi (56.76 km)	350 yd (320 m)
EF2	This long-tracked, strong tornado began in west-central Monroe County, damaging many trees and causing minor structural impacts before severely damaging a large horse barn, removing its roof and two walls. It continued into the Clear Creek area, where it caused minor home damage and tore the roof off a poorly anchored post office, snapping numerous trees nearby. As it moved east, it caused near-continuous EF0 to EF1 damage until intensifying near an old state road, where it destroyed unanchored outbuildings, tossed debris and a metal unit, and caused substantial roof damage to rental units while rolling several cars. The tornado then reached EF2 intensity at an older motel, removing its roof and walls and snapping trees behind it. As it crossed into Brown County, the tornado remained on the ground through dense forested terrain, occasionally hitting structures, and widened to nearly a quarter mile. EF2 damage was found in eastern Brown County, especially in Brown County State Park, where it intensified and widened to its peak width, snapping and uprooting nearly every tree in a long continuous swath through a campground and over ridges and valleys. The tornado then narrowed, with remaining damage mostly to trees and some weak structural impacts. It entered western Bartholomew County, causing tree damage and reaching EF1 intensity in northern parts of Grandview Lake before weakening and dissipating just east of the lake.						
EF1	NE of Annapolis, IL to York, IL to SW of Riverview	Crawford (IL), Clark (IL), Sullivan (IN)	IL, IN	39.1643°N 87.8026°W	23:38–23:55	10.68 mi (17.19 km)	100 yd (91 m)
EF1	This tornado started by causing minor tree damage as it moved east-northeast into southeastern Clark County. It continued into York, where it damaged multiple trees and a farm outbuilding. The tornado then crossed the Wabash River into Indiana before dissipating.						
EF1	S of Lambert	Scott	MO	37.0602°N 89.5621°W	23:40–23:42	1.31 mi (2.11 km)	100 yd (91 m)
EF1	A high-end EF1 caused total destruction to a detached garage/barn, damaged several farm buildings, and snapped or uprooted multiple trees before lifting just west of I-55.						
EF2	N of Allegre	Christian, Todd	KY	36.9465°N 87.3008°W	23:42–23:49	5.99 mi (9.64 km)	200 yd (180 m)
EF2	This significant tornado began with minor damage to a couple of homes before moving east into Todd county. It caused the most severe damage when it destroyed several chicken houses and swept away a mobile home. Along its path, dozens of trees were snapped or uprooted and a few outbuildings sustained damage before the tornado lifted west of KY 181.						
EF1	NE of Mitchellsville to N of Eagle	Saline	IL	37.6675°N 88.5131°W	23:48–23:54	6.75 mi (10.86 km)	75 yd (69 m)
EF1	Numerous trees were damaged.						
EF2	SE of Eagle to SW of Old Shawneetown	Saline, Gallatin	IL	37.6417°N 88.3804°W	23:56–00:05	9.93 mi (15.98 km)	250 yd (230 m)
EF2	This strong tornado began in far southeast Saline county, producing its most severe damage early in the path by snapping numerous trees and breaking wooden power poles. As it moved east into southern Gallatin county, it weakened while crossing IL 1 near Gibsonia. The tornado dissipated just before reaching the Ohio River.						
EF0	S of Brunerstown	Putnam	IN	39.6069°N 87.0044°W	23:58–00:00	0.43 mi (0.69 km)	20 yd (18 m)
EF0	Several trees were downed or uprooted.						
EF1	W of Sunman to Spades to SW of St. Peter	Ripley, Dearborn, Franklin	IN	39.25°N 85.13°W	00:02–00:11	6.33 mi (10.19 km)	250 yd (230 m)
EF1	This tornado initially broke large limbs from both softwood and hardwood trees. It continued northward, downing numerous trees at several properties and causing minor siding and roof shingle damage to at least one home. A more concentrated area of damage included uprooted and snapped large, healthy trees. The most severe damage occurred when a well-built outbuilding experienced a total collapse of its exterior walls. Tree damage persisted across nearby fields, and the tornado's final impact point included uplifted roofing on a barn and minor siding and shingle damage to a nearby home before it dissipated.						
EF3	WSW of Morganfield to S of Breckinridge Center	Union	KY	37.6597°N 88.0484°W	00:16–00:29	9.88 mi (15.90 km)	500 yd (460 m)
EF3	An intense tornado scoured agricultural fields before intensifying as it moved east across areas to the south of Morganfield. Several homes suffered severe to near-catastrophic damage with roofs and most exterior walls removed. The tornado weakened after crossing KY 56 and lifted in the eastern part of Union County. Four minor injuries occurred.						
EF2	NE of Newstead to Southern Hopkinsville	Christian	KY	36.8144°N 87.6108°W	02:26–02:34	10.03 mi (16.14 km)	225 yd (206 m)
EF2	This strong tornado touched down north of I-24, causing shingle damage to a house and significant damage to a couple of barns. As it moved east, it uprooted or snapped dozens of trees. Several homes sustained roof damage, particularly in residential areas along its path. The tornado snapped about half a dozen power poles as it crossed US 41 Alt.. Before lifting, it caused additional damage to a house and outbuildings near the end of its track.						
EF4	Whittle to Southern Somerset to Southern London	Russell, Pulaski, Laurel	KY	37.0159°N 85.0325°W	02:27–03:56	60.08 mi (96.69 km)	1,700 yd (1,600 m)
EF4	19 deaths – See article on this tornado – 108 people were injured.						
EF1	N of Russellville	Logan	KY	36.8719°N 86.911°W	02:55–02:57	2.57 mi (4.14 km)	75 yd (69 m)
EF1	This tornado touched down just east of US 431, causing minor tree damage near a residence. As it moved rapidly eastward, it caused weak damage to an outdoor shed, scattering debris into a nearby field. The tornado strengthened to EF1 near a small metal garage, lifting its roof, and continued to damage rooftops and outbuildings along its path. Its most significant damage occurred as it collapsed the exterior walls of a large farm building and shifted other nearby structures. After crossing a creek, the tornado weakened, producing additional tree damage before crossing US 68 and lifting shortly afterward in a field.						

== See also ==
- Weather of 2025
- Tornadoes of 2025
  - List of United States tornadoes in May 2025
- Lists of tornadoes and tornado outbreaks
  - List of North American tornadoes and tornado outbreaks
