= Wasson, Illinois =

- Unincorporated community
- Location within Illinois Location within the United States
- Coordinates: 37°47′17″N 88°29′05″W
- Country: United States
- State: Illinois
- County: Saline
- Elevation: 384 ft (117 m)
- Time zone: UTC-6 (Central (CST))
  - Summer (DST): UTC-5 (CDT)
- Area code: 618
- GNIS feature ID: 420629

Wasson is an unincorporated community in East Eldorado and Raleigh Townships, Saline County, Illinois, United States. Wasson is located along U.S. Route 45 3 miles (4.8 km) southwest of Eldorado.

Wasson started as a company village for the Wasson Coal Company outside of Harrisburg, Illinois. The village was named after C.M. Wasson and his son. Mr. Wasson began his career as a junk dealer and eventually became one of the leading coal mining and banking pioneers in Southern Illinois.
