= Cottage (disambiguation) =

A cottage is a small house.

Cottage may also refer to:

== Places ==
- Cottage, Mauritius, a village in Rivière du Rempart district, Mauritius
- Cottage, Missouri, a community in the United States
- Cottage City, Maryland
- Cottage Grove (disambiguation)
- Cottage Township, Saline County, Illinois

== Other uses ==
- Cottage, slang for a public toilet, used as gay slang from the 1960s, see Cottaging
- Cottage cheese, a kind of cheese curd
- Cottage country, a region with many cottages, particularly in Canada
- Cottage garden, profusely planted, random and carefree
- Cottage industry, subcontractors working in their own facility, usually their home
- Cottages (Van Gogh series), a subject of paintings by Vincent van Gogh
- Craven Cottage, the football stadium of Fulham F.C. in London, England
- Holiday cottage, a cottage or other small house used as vacation accommodation
- University Cottage Club, one of the ten eating clubs at Princeton University

== See also ==
- Cottager (disambiguation)
- The Cottage (disambiguation)
