= Lakeview, Illinois =

Lakeview
- Unincorporated community
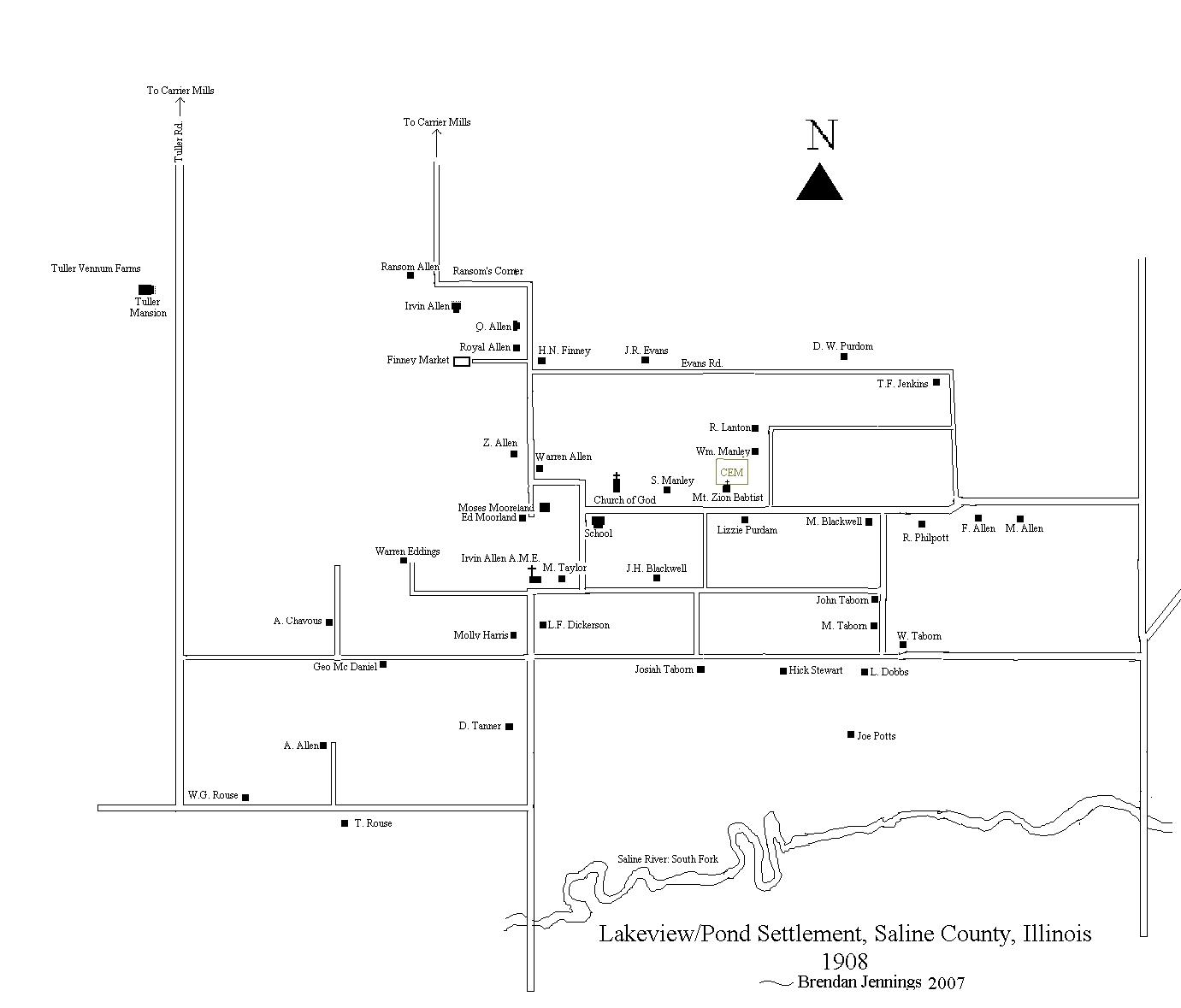
- Map of Lakeview circa 1908.
- Nickname: Pond Settlement
- Location of Lakeview within Illinois Lakeview (the United States)
- Coordinates: 37°40′21″N 88°36′59″W
- Country: United States
- State: Illinois
- County: Saline
- Founded: 1818–1820
- Time zone: UTC-6 (CST)
  - Summer (DST): UTC-5 (CDT)
- Area code: 618

Lakeview is an unincorporated predominantly African American community in the Carrier Mills township, Saline County, Illinois, United States. Lakeview was originally called "Pond Settlement." It was named after the Cypress swampland and wetlands that surrounds the area of Carrier Mills. It is one of the oldest settlements in Illinois, and holds the oldest predominantly African American cemetery in Illinois. Similar to the Maroon Communities in Louisiana, it is presumed to be the oldest community in Illinois founded by both runaway slaves and Freed men. The community is drained by the Saline River

Lakeview was established as a Freedmen's town by a group of African-American runaway slaves and freedmen who migrated from North Carolina shortly after the War of 1812. They arrived between 1818 and 1820. This area had been ideal for the Native Americans who had lived, hunted, fished, and farmed this region. The area now encompassed by the Carrier Mills Archaeological District preserves evidence of more than 10,000 years of human occupation, documenting successive Native American cultures that lived, hunted, fished, and farmed along the Saline River valley. The southern portion of the district later became the site of Lakeview. According to one account, only 13 Native American families remained and they welcomed the freedmen with open arms.

The South Fork of Saline River periodic flooding is the reason for the 19th century name "Pond Settlement," later changed to "Lakeview." For similar reasons, Harrisburg was named "Crusoe's Island" prior to 1850. The area remains flood-prone today.

Census records indicate that the first settlers were the Allen, Blackwell, Taborn, Mitchell, Evans, Cofield, and Coleman Families. These earliest Lakeview residents were mostly self-sufficient. They depended on a mixture of hunting and farming for their food. The early families had substantial land holdings in the Pre–Civil War era. It was only after the village of Morrillsville, later known as Carrier Mills, was established that some of these holdings were sold off. Whites continued to buy land around Lakeview during the remainder of the nineteenth century, resulting in the breakup of the larger land holdings.

Never a formal community or village, Lakeview covered a series of farmsteads concentrated about 3 square miles (7.8 km^{2}); however, the focus of the settlement has always been on the church and school, along what is now Taborn Road.

Lakeview had its own school and grocery store along with many homes. In 1850, a Union Church was established near Carrier Mills in Saline County. Most members were either Baptist or Methodist. An African Methodist Episcopal Church was organized at the home of Irvin Allen, who then built a one-room log church building on his property. Later they organized and built a frame structure on the M. Taylor farm. After the church burned they rebuilt and moved the church to Carrier Mills where it sits today. This congregation is now Baber Chapel AME Church. The Lakeview cemetery, founded in 1838, has become a state historical landmark. The area of Lakeview is still nearly 100% black. After the closing of the Lakeview school in the 1950s, many people moved to the east side of Carrier Mills. Descendants of Lakeview have continued to hold an annual community reunion at the cemetery on Memorial Day for decades, a tradition dating to the 19th century.

The Pankey Road approach to Lakeview at the Carrier Mills city limits.

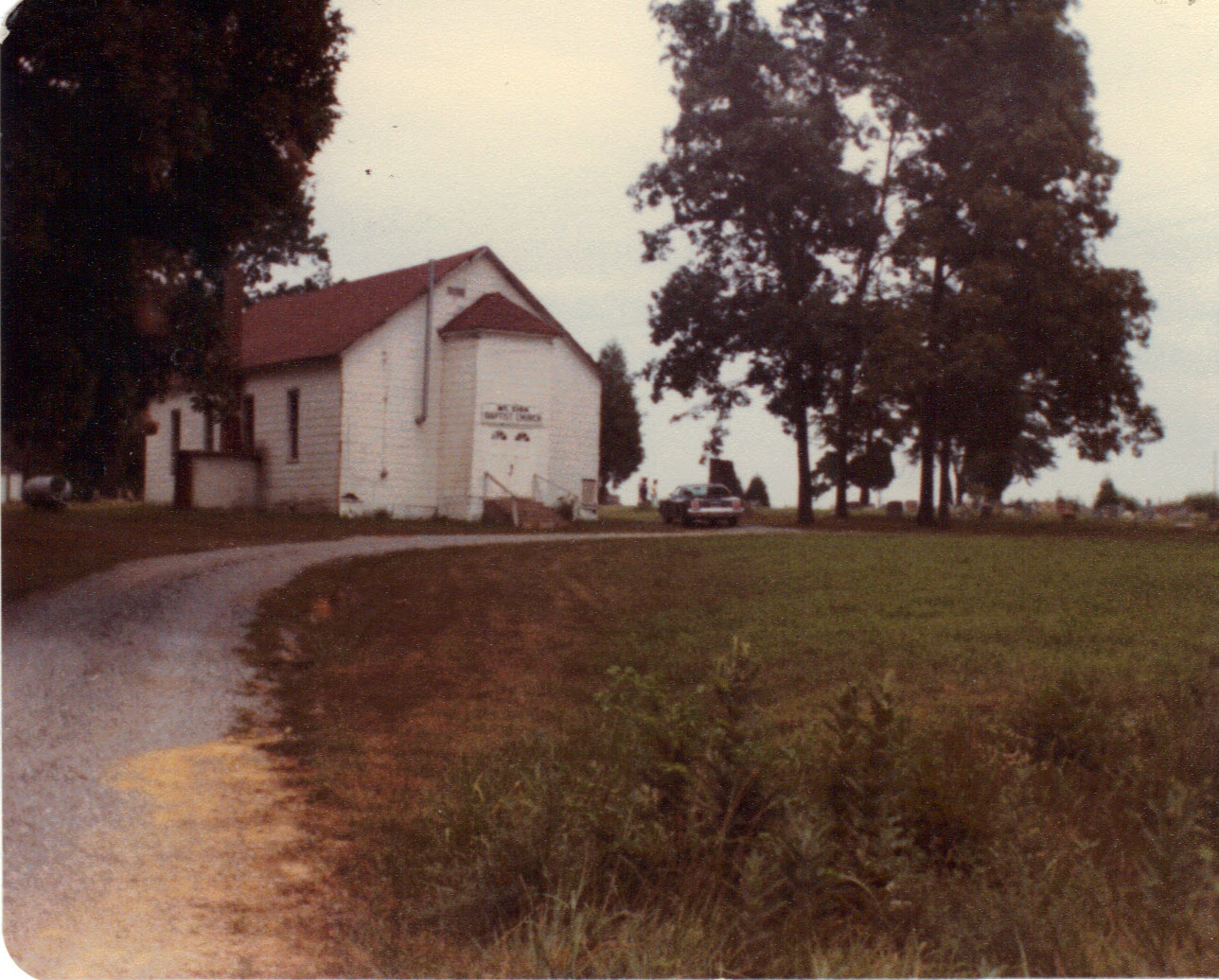
Lakeview Cemetery

Deputy Royce E. Cline was the only police officer to die in the line of duty in Saline County. He was shot and killed by a suspected bootlegger in the "pond settlement" on Friday, August 14, 1925.

In 2022 a preliminary application for a federal historical designation district was submitted by Lakeview descendant Brendan Jennings. The Saline County Tourism Board voted to create a committee to spearhead the project.

In 2023 the Illinois Department of Natural Resources (IDNR) was awarded a $75,000 grant from the National Park Service to recognize significant African American heritage properties in southern Illinois. It was a collaborative effort between the Illinois State Historic Preservation Office, a division of the Illinois Department of Natural Resources, and the Center for Archaeological Investigations at Southern Illinois University to be used to produce National Register nominations for three resources associated with Black history in southern Illinois. Additionally, the project will amend the existing National Register nominations for the following sites including the Carrier Mills Archaeological District, to reflect the African American heritage of the Pond Settlement, also known as Lakeview.

In 2025, Lakeview was featured in an Illinois Humanities program discussing the area’s historical connection to the family of former Chicago mayor Harold Washington. Washington’s mother, Bertha Jones, was raised in Lakeview before the family moved to Chicago. In 2026, descendants of the Lakeview community and local preservation advocates organized a Memorial Day weekend event at Lakeview Cemetery to highlight the history of the settlement and ongoing preservation efforts. The event included historical presentations, cemetery tours, and discussion of efforts to identify and preserve unmarked graves associated with the historic African American community. Southern Illinois University Carbondale’s Morris Library has identified Lakeview, historically also known as Pond Settlement, as one of Southern Illinois’ antebellum free Black communities through its “Reclaiming the African American Heritage of Southern Illinois Project.” In 2026, SIU Carbondale launched a six-week archaeology field school in the Lakeview community led by anthropology professor Matthew C. Greer. The early phases of the project focused on investigating an Allen family farmstead believed to date to the 1840s. Future excavations will include surveys and digs of potentially older settlement sites and ground-penetrating radar studies at Lakeview Cemetery to help identify unmarked graves.

== Demographics ==
Historical population
Census	Pop.	Note	%±
1830	24		—
1840	43		79.2%
1850	22		−48.8%
1860	59		168.2%
1870	101		71.2%
1880	128		26.7%
Decennial US Census

=== Historical Demographics ===
Historical census returns indicate that Lakeview reached an estimated population of 128 residents in 31 households by 1880, making it larger than the neighboring railroad settlement of Morrillsville (now Carrier Mills), which recorded 105 residents that same year, and 40 years older. Earlier census returns show Lakeview's estimated population at 24 (1830), 43 (1840), 22 (1850), 59 (1860), and 101 (1870). Contemporary archaeological and historical research suggests that the settlement experienced significant growth following the American Civil War as African American families migrated into the community.

Because Lakeview was never incorporated as a municipality or designated as a census place, the U.S. Census Bureau has not published separate official population totals for the community since the nineteenth century. Modern federal censuses instead enumerate residents as part of the surrounding Carrier Mills Township and nearby incorporated communities, making it impossible to determine Lakeview's present-day population from census data alone.

== See also ==
- Harrisburg, Illinois
- Carrier Mills, Illinois
