= Pankeyville, Illinois =

- Unincorporated community
- Location within Illinois Location within the United States
- Coordinates: 37°42′30″N 88°32′10″W
- Country: United States
- State: Illinois
- County: Saline
- Elevation: 371 ft (113 m)
- Time zone: UTC-6 (Central (CST))
  - Summer (DST): UTC-5 (CDT)
- Area code: 618
- GNIS feature ID: 415344

Pankeyville is an unincorporated community in Harrisburg Township, Saline County, Illinois, United States. Pankeyville is located along Illinois Route 34 and Illinois Route 145 2 miles (3.2 km) south of Harrisburg.
