= Texas City, Illinois =

- Unincorporated community
- Location within Illinois Location within the United States
- Coordinates: 37°52′42″N 88°23′36″W
- Country: United States
- State: Illinois
- County: Saline
- Elevation: 371 ft (113 m)
- Time zone: UTC-6 (Central (CST))
  - Summer (DST): UTC-5 (CDT)
- Area code: 618
- GNIS feature ID: 419613

Texas City is an unincorporated community in Rector Township, Saline County, Illinois, United States. Texas City is located at the junction of U.S. Route 45 and County Highway 6 5 miles (8.0 km) north-northeast of Eldorado.
