= Liberty, Saline County, Illinois =

Liberty, Illinois
- Unincorporated community
- Location within Illinois Location within the United States
- Coordinates: 37°43′12″N 88°34′18″W
- Country: United States
- State: Illinois
- County: Saline
- Elevation: 443 ft (135 m)
- Time zone: UTC-6 (Central (CST))
  - Summer (DST): UTC-5 (CDT)
- Area code: 618
- GNIS feature ID: 411981

Liberty (also known as Ingrams) is an unincorporated community in Harrisburg Township, Saline County, Illinois, United States. Liberty is located on County Route 37 along the southwestern border of Harrisburg.

Liberty was a smaller rural community to the far southwest of Harrisburg along Liberty Road. It includes the Liberty Church and cemetery. In 1873, the designer of the Cairo and Vincennes Railroad, Green Berry Raum of Harrisburg, opened a slope mine on the south side of the rails near Liberty. It became the first in the county to ship coal by rail car. The mine was called the Ledford Slope, and the spot was called Liberty Crossing. Liberty is bordered by the old mining community of Ledford 3 miles (4.8 km) south of Harrisburg and Dorrisville to the west and Buena Vista to the north. Liberty holds the new Junior High building.

James Alexander Harris along with John Pankey, James P. Yandell, and John X. Cain, donated land for the first additions of the town to a special committee at Liberty Baptist Church in 1852, after complaints that the county seat should be centralized in the county. The city of Harrisburg, Illinois was soon founded.
