= Rudement, Illinois =

- Unincorporated community
- Location within Illinois Location within the United States
- Coordinates: 37°38′11″N 88°29′25″W
- Country: United States
- State: Illinois
- County: Saline
- Elevation: 397 ft (121 m)
- Time zone: UTC-6 (Central (CST))
  - Summer (DST): UTC-5 (CDT)
- Area code: 618
- GNIS feature ID: 417028

Rudement is an unincorporated community in Independence Township, Saline County, Illinois, United States. Rudement is located on Illinois Route 34 7.5 miles (12.1 km) south-southeast of Harrisburg.
