= West End, Illinois =

- Unincorporated community
- Location within Illinois Location within the United States
- Coordinates: 37°53′24″N 88°42′20″W
- Country: United States
- State: Illinois
- County: Franklin, Saline
- Elevation: 449 ft (137 m)
- Time zone: UTC-6 (Central (CST))
  - Summer (DST): UTC-5 (CDT)
- Area code: 618
- GNIS feature ID: 420822

West End is an unincorporated community in Franklin and Saline counties in the U.S. state of Illinois. The portion of the community in Franklin County is part of Cave Township, while the portion in Saline County is part of Tate Township. The community is located along Illinois Route 34 3.7 miles (6.0 km) east-southeast of Thompsonville.
