= The Cottage =

The Cottage may refer to:

== Structures ==
- The Cottage (Upper Marlboro, Maryland), US, listed on the National Register of Historic Places
- The Cottage, Charlton, Northamptonshire, England, an 18th-century house
- The Cottage, Studley Royal, North Yorkshire, England, a 19th-century house
- The Cottage in Thorpe, Surrey, England, a 15th-century house
- Craven Cottage, the football stadium of Fulham F.C. in London, often referred to as "The Cottage"
- 22 Bayley Lane, a grade II* listed building in Coventry, England

== Arts and entertainment ==
- The Cottage (video game), a 1978 text-adventure game
- The Cottage (film), a 2008 British horror film
- The Cottage (Heated Rivalry), a 2025 television episode
- The Cottage, a 2012 film starring Bellamy Young
- The Cottage, a 2023 Broadway play at the Hayes Theater (Second Stage)
- "The Cottage", a short story by Frank Belknap Long in his 1972 collection The Rim of the Unknown

== See also ==
- Cottage (disambiguation)
