= Stone Fort Township, Illinois =

Stone Fort is the name of two townships or precincts in the U.S. state of Illinois:

- Stone Fort Township, Saline County, Illinois
- Stonefort Precinct, Williamson County, Illinois
