= Tate Township =

Tate Township may refer to the following townships in the United States:

- Tate Township, Saline County, Illinois
- Tate Township, Clermont County, Ohio
