= New Hope, Illinois =

- Unincorporated community
- Location within Illinois Location within the United States
- Coordinates: 37°47′38″N 88°41′20″W
- Country: United States
- State: Illinois
- County: Saline
- Elevation: 489 ft (149 m)
- Time zone: UTC-6 (Central (CST))
  - Summer (DST): UTC-5 (CDT)
- Area code: 618
- GNIS feature ID: 423018

New Hope is an unincorporated community in Brushy Township, Saline County, Illinois, United States. New Hope is 5.5 miles (8.9 km) southwest of Galatia.
