= Prism (video game) =

2016 video game

- App icon
- Developer: Clint Siu
- Publisher: Clint Siu
- Platforms: iOS, Android
- Release: iOS; February 11, 2016; Android; June 16, 2016
- Genre: Puzzle
- Mode: Single-player

Prism (stylized as _PRISM) is a 2016 puzzle game developed and published by Clint Siu. Gameplay involves the player moving lines on a shape's surface to unlock its core. Developed during Stugan, a two-month games accelerator program, it was released for iOS in February 2016 and Android in June 2016 and was met with praise for its simple gameplay and graphics.

== Gameplay ==
In Prism, the player has to manipulate shapes to find their core.

In each of the game's thirteen levels, the player explores a microcosmic galaxy and must solve puzzles on a shape to reveal its core, by tapping, sliding, and spinning the lines on a shape's surface into designated markings. Later levels task the player to change the shape's form.

== Development and release ==
Prism was developed by Clint Siu in 2015 during the first Stugan, a games accelerator program where participants spend two months in an isolated cabin in Sweden developing games. Siu had produced Squirrel Squabble in college with two programmers; at the Independent Games Festival, it won the Student Showcase award. According to Siu, the graphics of Prism were inspired by unfolding origami and made realistic to portray looking through a microscope. Prism was released for iOS on February 11, 2016, and subsequently for Android on June 16, 2016.

== Reception ==
Reception

Aggregate score
Aggregator	Score
Metacritic	84/100

Review scores
Publication	Score
Pocket Gamer	4.5/5
TouchArcade	4.5/5
148Apps	3.5/5
Multiplayer.it	8/10

On Metacritic, Prism received a "generally favorable" score of 84 based on six critics. Reviewers positively received Prism's gameplay. While some critics compared the game to The Room, others found it similar to The Witness. Some appreciated the game's lack of a tutorial that allowed the player to learn by themselves, with Pocket Gamer's Harry Slater stating that the game's puzzles have straightforward solutions. 148Apps's Jennifer Allen found Prism relaxing and slow-paced, commenting that it would be fit for playing after work. However, Slater criticized how the game forced the player to solve a specific solution. Critics praised the game's graphics and soundtrack.
