= Derby, Illinois =

Derby, Illinois may refer to:

- Derby, Ford County, Illinois, an unincorporated community
- Derby, Saline County, Illinois, an unincorporated community
