= Galatia Township, Saline County, Illinois =

Galatia Township
- Township

- Location of Illinois in the United States
- Coordinates: 37°50′00″N 88°39′00″W
- Country: United States
- State: Illinois
- County: Saline
- Settled: November 5, 1889

Area
  - Total: 18.73 sq mi (48.5 km^{2})
  - Land: 18.61 sq mi (48.2 km^{2})
  - Water: 0.12 sq mi (0.31 km^{2})
- Elevation: 384 ft (117 m)

Population (2010)
  - Estimate (2016): 1,200
  - Density: 66.1/sq mi (25.5/km^{2})
- Time zone: UTC-6 (CST)
  - Summer (DST): UTC-5 (CDT)
- FIPS code: 17-165-28274

Galatia Township is located in Saline County, Illinois. As of the 2010 census, its population was 1,230 and it contained 592 housing units.

== History ==
Galatia Township is named for Albert Gallatin.

== Geography ==
According to the 2010 census, the township has a total area of 18.73 square miles (48.5 km^{2}), of which 18.61 square miles (48.2 km^{2}) (or 99.36%) is land and 0.12 square miles (0.31 km^{2}) (or 0.64%) is water.

== Demographics ==
Historical population
Census	Pop.	Note	%±
2016 (est.)	1,200
U.S. Decennial Census
