= Carrier Mills Archaeological District =

Archaeological site in Illinois, United States

- Carrier Mills Archeological District
- U.S. National Register of Historic Places
- U.S. Historic district
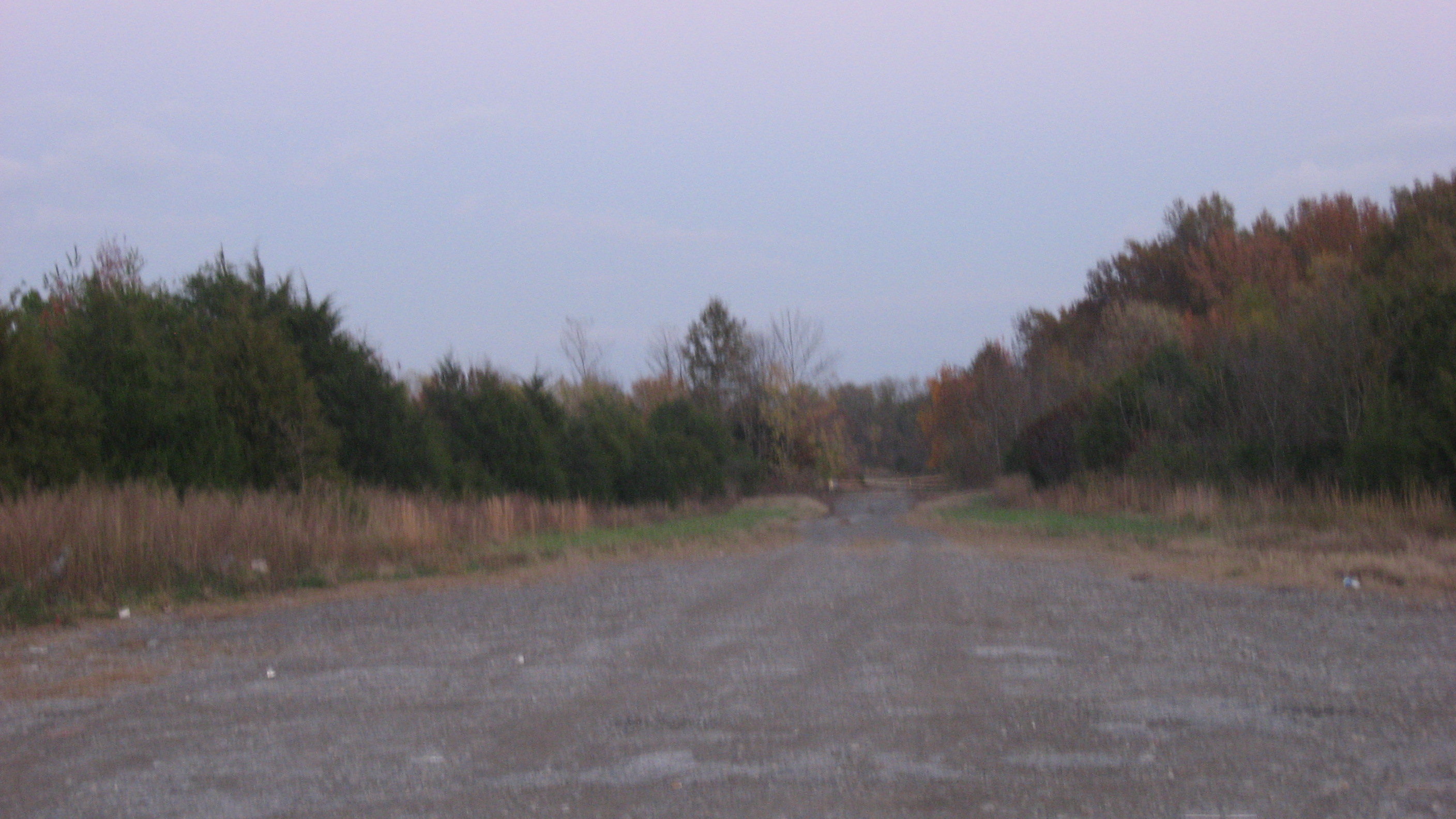

- Location within Illinois Location within the United States
- Location: Along the Saline River south of Carrier Mills, Illinois
- Coordinates: 37°39′28″N 88°37′04″W
- Area: 143 acres (58 ha)
- NRHP reference No.: 78001184
- Added to NRHP: August 25, 1978

The Carrier Mills Archaeological District is a group of prehistoric archaeological sites located along the Saline River south of Carrier Mills, Illinois. The sites were inhabited over the period from 2500 B.C. to 700 A.D. The oldest three sites date from the Late Archaic period, which encompassed the first 1500 years of occupation at the district; these sites include two small campsites and a larger base camp. Several sites were inhabited during the Early Woodland period, which lasted until 500 B.C.; these sites are distinguished by fragments of pottery, which was developed during this period. The Early Woodland period sites are likely to have been a part of the Crab Orchard culture, a local subtype of the Hopewell tradition. A number of sites date from the Middle Woodland Period, which spanned from 300 B.C. to 500 A.D.; these sites appear to have adopted the technology, but not the traditions, of the Hopewell culture. A single projectile point from the Late Woodland period has also been recovered from the site.

The site was added to the National Register of Historic Places on August 25, 1978.
