= Cottage Grove =

Cottage Grove may refer to a number of places in the United States:

- Cottage Grove, Illinois
- Cottage Grove, Indiana
- Cottage Grove, Minnesota
- Cottage Grove, Oregon
- Cottage Grove, Tennessee
- Cottage Grove, Wisconsin
- Cottage Grove (town), Wisconsin
- Cottage Grove Township, Allen County, Kansas
- Cottage Grove, Houston, a community in Houston, Texas

== See also ==
- Cottage Grove, short for East 63rd-Cottage Grove (CTA), a transit station in Chicago's 'L' system
