= Mitchellsville, Illinois =

- Unincorporated community
- Location within Illinois Location within the United States
- Coordinates: 37°39′02″N 88°32′16″W
- Country: United States
- State: Illinois
- County: Saline
- Elevation: 377 ft (115 m)
- Time zone: UTC-6 (Central (CST))
  - Summer (DST): UTC-5 (CDT)
- Area code: 618
- GNIS feature ID: 413689

Mitchellsville is an unincorporated community in Independence Township, Saline County, Illinois, United States. Mitchellsville is located along Illinois Route 34 and Illinois Route 145 6 miles (9.7 km) south of Harrisburg.
