= Eagle, Illinois =

- Unincorporated community
- Location within Illinois Location within the United States
- Coordinates: 37°39′04″N 88°23′34″W
- Country: United States
- State: Illinois
- County: Saline
- Elevation: 381 ft (116 m)
- Time zone: UTC-6 (Central (CST))
  - Summer (DST): UTC-5 (CDT)
- Area code: 618
- GNIS feature ID: 422648

Eagle is an unincorporated community in Mountain Township, Saline County, Illinois, United States. Eagle is 10 miles (16 km) southeast of Harrisburg.
