= Derby, Saline County, Illinois =

Derby, Illinois
- Unincorporated community
- Location within Illinois Location within the United States
- Coordinates: 37°37′44″N 88°23′08″W
- Country: United States
- State: Illinois
- County: Saline
- Elevation: 469 ft (143 m)
- Time zone: UTC-6 (Central (CST))
  - Summer (DST): UTC-5 (CDT)
- Area code: 618
- GNIS feature ID: 422620

Derby is an unincorporated community in Mountain Township, Saline County, Illinois, United States. Derby is located southeast of Harrisburg.
