= Cottager =

Cottager or Cottagers may refer to:

- The Cottagers, opera by George Saville Carey
- Chalupáři, Czech comedy
- The Cottagers, nickname for Fulham F.C., a football club in London
- Cottagers, one of the levels of serfdom in feudal societies

== See also ==
- Backstugusittare (lit. 'hill cottage sitter'), in Swedish social history, a class of rural residents
- Cottage (disambiguation)
