= Sahara Woods State Fish and Wildlife Area =

State park in Illinois, United States

- IUCN category V (protected landscape/seascape)
- Location within Illinois Location within the United States
- Location: Saline County, Illinois
- Nearest city: Harrisburg, Illinois
- Coordinates: 37.718°N 88.648°W
- Area: 4,100 acres (17 km^{2})
- Governing body: Illinois Department of Natural Resources

The Sahara Woods State Fish and Wildlife Area is a 4,100-acre (1,700 ha) state park owned and operated by the Illinois Department of Natural Resources (IDNR). It is located in Saline County, five miles west of the small city of Harrisburg.

The fish and wildlife area is made up of former bituminous coal properties strip-mined by the Sahara Coal Company starting in 1936. The park currently consists of approximately 2,300 acres of open space, 1,500 acres of timber and brush, and 275 acres of lakes, ponds, and wetlands. The IDNR describes the topography of the parcel as "a former surface mine which consists of spoil ridges interspersed with timber, grasslands, small ponds and a large lake".

After shutting down the mine in 1993, Sahara Coal donated the land making up the mine to the state of Illinois in 1999. Remediation work continues. The park was partly opened to deer hunters in 2003. As of 2022, the park continues to be managed for hunting purposes, with archery deer, dove, quail, rabbit, squirrel, turkey, and various fur-bearing small game availabilities. Permits and licenses are required.

As of 2025, the state tract has also been redeveloped for off-road vehicle (ORV) recreational use. Starting in November 2017, IDNR had worked to build a 26-mile (42 km) ORV trail network. The spoil ridges left behind by the former coal-mining shovels were judged by the United States Department of Transportation to be highly suitable for ORV-oriented redevelopment as part of the nationwide Recreational Trails Program. The new ORV trail system was opened to the public on May 2, 2025. A day permit fee is required.
