= Long Branch Township, Saline County, Illinois =

Long Branch Township
- Township

- Location of Illinois in the United States
- Coordinates: 37°53′10″N 88°32′19″W
- Country: United States
- State: Illinois
- County: Saline
- Settled: November 5, 1889

Area
  - Total: 18.31 sq mi (47.4 km^{2})
  - Land: 18.26 sq mi (47.3 km^{2})
  - Water: 0.05 sq mi (0.13 km^{2})
- Elevation: 423 ft (129 m)

Population (2010)
  - Estimate (2016): 244
  - Density: 13.6/sq mi (5.3/km^{2})
- Time zone: UTC-6 (CST)
  - Summer (DST): UTC-5 (CDT)
- FIPS code: 17-165-44485

Long Branch Township is located in Saline County, Illinois. As of the 2010 census, its population was 248 and it contained 103 housing units.

== Geography ==
According to the 2010 census, the township has a total area of 18.31 square miles (47.4 km^{2}), of which 18.26 square miles (47.3 km^{2}) (or 99.73%) is land and 0.05 square miles (0.13 km^{2}) (or 0.27%) is water.

== Demographics ==
Historical population
Census	Pop.	Note	%±
2016 (est.)	244
U.S. Decennial Census
