= Cottage Grove, Illinois =

- Unincorporated community
- Location within Illinois Location within the United States
- Coordinates: 37°44′53″N 88°24′38″W
- Country: United States
- State: Illinois
- County: Saline
- Elevation: 430 ft (130 m)
- Time zone: UTC-6 (Central (CST))
  - Summer (DST): UTC-5 (CDT)
- Area code: 618
- GNIS feature ID: 422582

Cottage Grove is an unincorporated community in Cottage Township, Saline County, Illinois, United States. Cottage Grove is 4 miles (6.4 km) west-northwest of Equality.

Cottage Grove Cemetery sits across the road from the old Cottage Grove school. The community sits to the east of Southeastern Illinois College.
