= Saline County State Fish and Wildlife Area =

State park in Illinois, United States

- IUCN category IV (habitat/species management area)
- Location within Illinois Location within the United States
- Location: Saline County, Illinois, USA
- Nearest city: Colchester, Illinois
- Coordinates: 37°42′08″N 88°22′36″W
- Area: 1,270 acres (510 ha)
- Established: 1959
- Governing body: Illinois Department of Natural Resources

Saline County State Fish and Wildlife Area is an Illinois state park on 1,270 acres (510 ha) in Saline County, Illinois, United States. The state parkland contains a slightly salty spring, from which water could be boiled down into salt by a pioneer saltworks.
