= The Cottage (video game) =

1978 video game

- Swedish cover art
- Developers: Viggo Kann; Kimmo Eriksson; Olle Johansson
- Publisher: Scandinavian PC Systems
- Platforms: Oden (DEC-10), IBM PC
- Release: 1978 (Oden); 1986 (IBM PC)
- Genre: Adventure
- Mode: Single-player

The Cottage (Swedish: Stugan) is an adventure video game that was initially made available in 1978 for the DEC-10 mainframe computer Oden in Stockholm, and later published by Scandinavian PC Systems for IBM PCs in 1986 in Swedish, Danish, Norwegian and English. It was the first publicly available Swedish adventure game and one of the first commercial Swedish video games.

The game is set in a cottage in Småland, Sweden; the player explores the cottage and its surroundings by typing simple commands to indicate what they want to do or where they want to go. They aim to find items and perform certain actions to raise their score and rank, while avoiding traps and enemy characters, with the ultimate goal of getting inducted into the cottage council.

The game was developed in the 1970s and 1980s by Viggo Kann, Kimmo Eriksson and Olle Johansson, three children who had played the game Adventure and wanted to create a similar game in Swedish. The Cottage began as a collection of smaller games the three had previously developed on their own, with the player moving through an amusement arcade to choose what to play; as they found it more fun to move through the arcade than to play the games, they ended up expanding the area to explore and removing most of the smaller games. Several thousand copies of the IBM PC release were sold; despite this, the developers did not receive much money from it outside of pre-paid royalties. The game had a cult-like status among Oden users at the time, and was commercially important to the computer center in Stockholm.

== Gameplay ==
The player reads textual descriptions of what is happening in the game, and writes short commands to perform actions.

The Cottage is set in a surreal environment in the Småland province in Sweden, and begins on the pier of a lake, outside a cottage surrounded by a deep forest and waterfalls. The cottage is larger on the inside than the outside, and has nine underground levels. The player is able to move in four cardinal directions and perform actions by typing simple commands, such as "North", "Left" and "Take ball". Their aim is to explore the cottage and its surroundings to find and collect items. The inside of the cottage includes obstacles such as trapdoors the player can fall through and robbers who can steal the player's valuables, while the cottage's surroundings include "mysterious creatures" that the player can encounter.

At the start of the game, the player's score is set to the value of 50; their goal is to increase it as much as possible, for the maximum score of 307. This is done by performing certain actions, finding new areas, solving puzzles, and by finding and keeping treasures and valuable items. In exchange for some of their score, the player can receive hints or get resurrected following an in-game death. The player is ranked in accordance with their score: they start as a "clumsy rookie", (Note: Swedish: "Klantig nybörjare") and eventually become an "expert on Småland houses". (Note: Swedish: "Expert på hus i Småland") Upon finishing the game, the player gets inducted into the cottage council. (Note: Swedish: "Stugrådet")

== Development ==
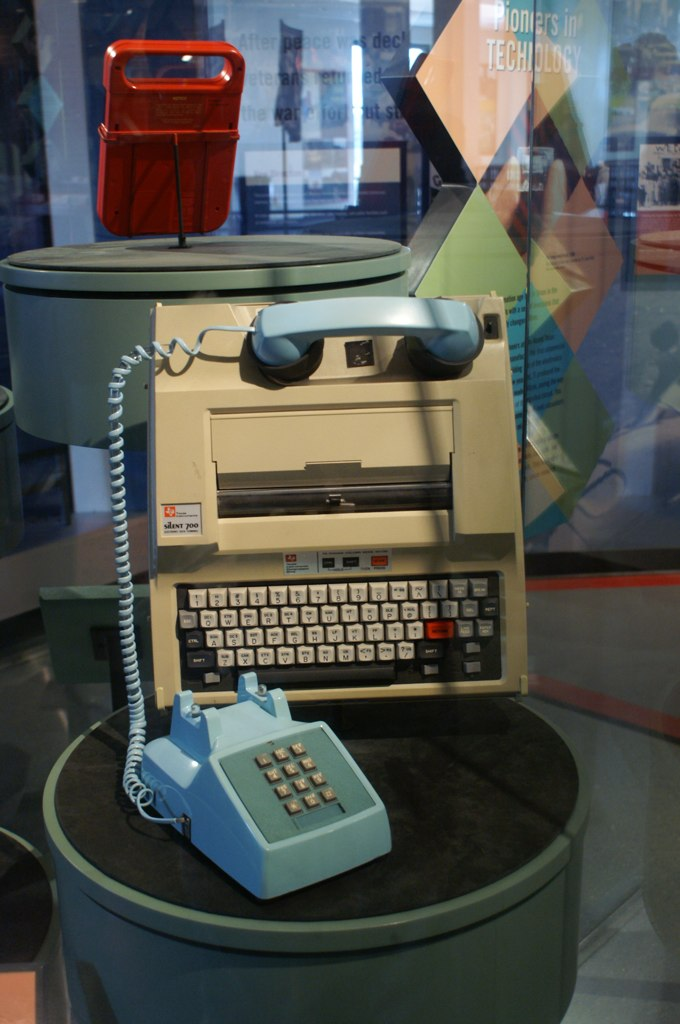
The Cottage was mainly programmed on a Texas Silent Writer computer terminal.

The Cottage was originally developed in 1977–1978 by three children: brothers Viggo Kann (then Eriksson) and Kimmo Eriksson, and their friend Olle Johansson, who at the time of the project's start were ten, twelve and fourteen years old, respectively. As Viggo and Kimmo's parents worked at Stockholms Datamaskincentral ("Stockholm's Computer Center", QZ) and the KTH Royal Institute of Technology, and Johansson's father worked at an office that was a client for QZ, they had access to QZ's DEC-10 mainframe computer Oden. Using Oden and the book What to Do After You Hit Return (1975), the Eriksson brothers and Johansson learned programming.

With the help from system developers at QZ, the three set up their game – at the time just titled Stuga ("Cottage") – on Oden in 1978, and created the message board Thorvalds stugråd ("Thorvald's cottage council") for it; scientists working at QZ played the game, and were able to discuss it on the message board. The developers participated in the discussions, and used the message board to find information about bugs in the game. The Eriksson brothers and Johansson used a single Texas Silent Writer computer terminal in the Erikssons' parents' bedroom to program the game, through which they could log into Oden. Connecting to Oden was expensive, so they sometimes visited KTH during the evening to work on the game, as Oden only cost money to use during the day. At KTH, they had access to one terminal each, which used actual monitors to display text, as opposed to their writer terminal at home which printed the text on "enormous amounts of paper".

All three had previously programmed their own video games: Johansson had made a Mastermind game featuring an opponent character named Thorvald; Kimmo had made a slot machine game and a tic-tac-toe game; and Kann had made a guessing game similar to hangman. They thought about how they wanted to combine their games into one single amusement arcade-themed game, where the player could pick which of the games they wanted to play, but due to difficulties in unifying the three developers' different programming methods, the game's code became "messy"; Kann eventually decided to make a "final push" and managed to finish and unify the program.

When they had finished programming and connecting the arcade, they realized that it was more fun to walk around in the arcade than to actually play the games. They ended up creating more and more rooms in the arcade, with characters to play games with, but as the arcade area and its surroundings grew, they eventually decided to remove the arcade games. Instead, they added new elements, including "shady characters", animals and items; the elements that remained from the arcade were the slot machine and the character Thorvald. Due to frequent discussions at the Thorvalds stugråd message board asking whether various aspects of the game were intended or not, the developers added an animal character that yells "Help, I don't know if I'm a bug or a feature!" (Note: Swedish: "Hjälp, jag vet inte om jag är en bug eller en feature!") before running into the water and disappearing.

Having played Adventure (1976) on Oden and finding its cave exploration exciting, they wondered if they would be able to create a similar game in Swedish. As they worked on the game, they grew into different roles: Kimmo mostly came up with "wacky ideas", Johansson was a driven visionary who "made things happen", and Kann fixed things and made sure that everything worked. According to Kimmo and Johansson, they cared about the game's content, not just the technical aspects, and made a game that they found fun themselves. They created two reoccurring characters based on themselves, who appear throughout the game: Kimmo, based on the real Kimmo, and the "cottage council chairman" Thorvald, who represents Johansson. As Kann was interested in language, and had specific ideas of how to spell certain words, they used consistently correct grammar, while consistently using non-standard but phonetic spelling for words such as "sig" ("oneself") and "dem" ("them"), rendering them as "sej" and "dom".

The Eriksson brothers and Johansson used the programming language BASIC to create the game, which Kimmo called noteworthy: it was considered impossible to write big programs in BASIC, and The Cottage was "gigantic". The reason for their choice in programming language was that it was the only one all three knew beforehand; Kimmo said that they would no longer have chosen BASIC if they had programmed The Cottage in 1986, as they had access to many more programming languages by that time. According to Johansson, another reason was "pure defiance" towards the Eriksson brothers' father, who had told them they would never be able to get the game running if they programmed it in BASIC. Johansson said that the most challenging aspect of the development was getting the game to understand the Swedish language; to keep the size of the game's command interpreter "reasonable", they decided to limit it to two-word commands. Acknowledging that different people use different words for things, they play-tested it with friends and family, writing down all attempted commands and deciding what the game should be expected to understand. During a short period of the game's development, the developers also logged all actions players at QZ had taken that the command interpreter had not understood; based on this data, they improved the interpreter and changed the outcomes to certain actions. At one point, the Eriksson brothers and Johansson took a two-year break from the game, but eventually returned to it and finished it in 1979. At this point, the only ways to play the game were by using a computer terminal in a university or by connecting to Oden via a modem.

=== Home release ===
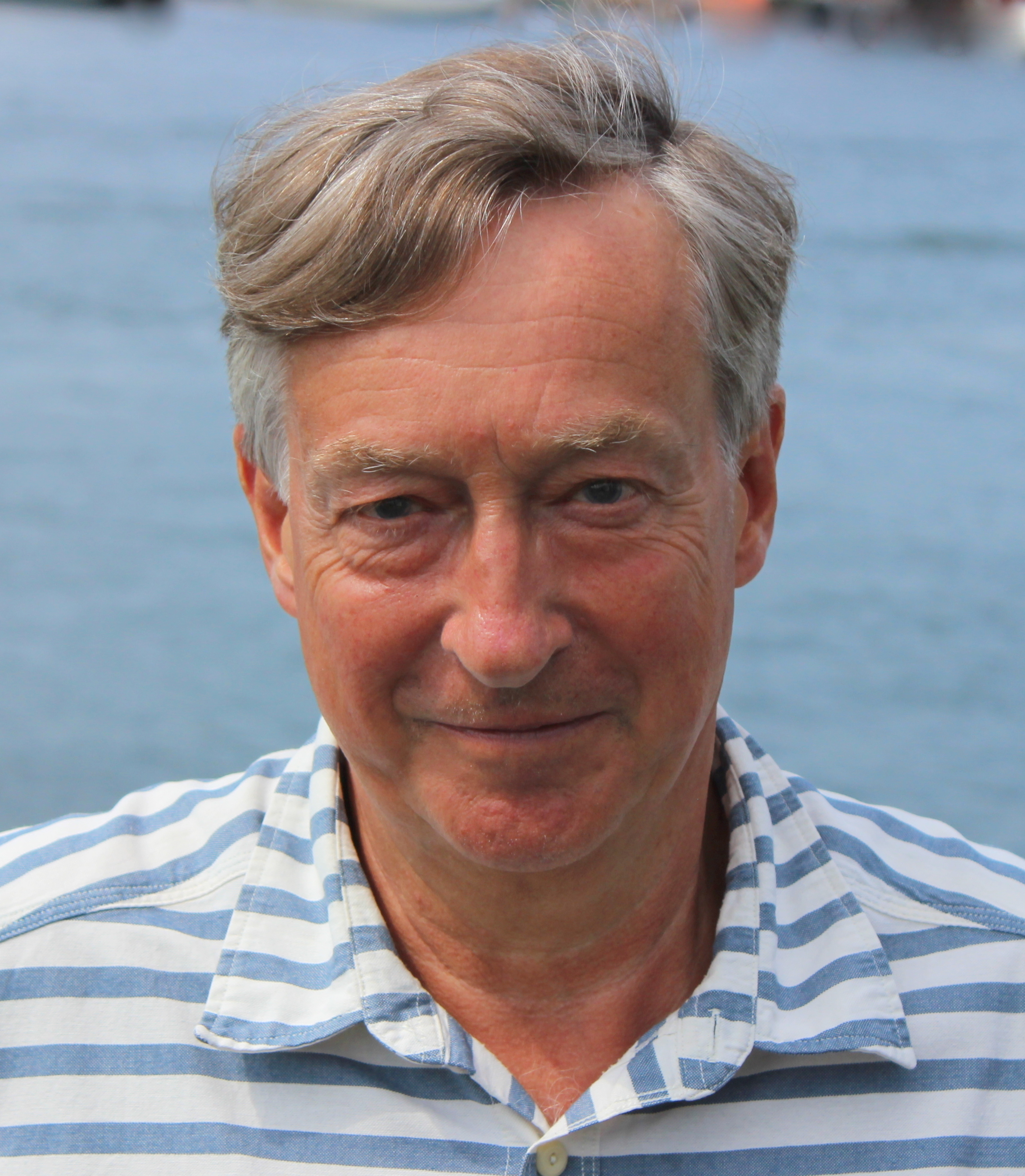
The publisher learned of the game through journalist Erik Fichtelius (pictured in 2015).

The Eriksson brothers and Johansson did not work much more on the game until 1984, when the journalist Erik Fichtelius conducted an interview about the game for the Swedish airline Linjeflyg's magazine Upp&Ner, which was distributed to all their airplanes in 1985. Fichtelius asked Johansson why they had not made the game commercially available for home computers; Johansson said that it had been considered but that they had only developed the game because it was a fun challenge for them, and that they would have to find a distributor of computer programs if they wanted to create a PC version.

The business software publisher Scandinavian PC Systems (Note: Scandinavian PC Systems later changed their name to Visma Spcs.) found out about the game through Upp&Ner; they were expanding at the time and wanted to add a video game to their catalogue, so they contacted the game's developers. The Eriksson brothers and Johansson developed a version for home computers, but had problems with compiling it for the PC, as it was a much larger BASIC program than most compilers could handle. Due to copyright issues, a scene in the mainframe version of the game where the player guest stars in The Muppet Show had to be cut for the commercial release, but all other materials remained intact; additionally, some visuals and audio were created and added for this release. The game was published by Scandinavian PC Systems for IBM PCs in Swedish, Danish, Norwegian and English in 1986. The developers negotiated with Scandinavian PC Systems, and were given 5 SEK per sold copy of the Swedish version and 2 SEK per sold foreign copy as royalties; 30,000 SEK of the royalties were pre-paid.

== Reception and legacy ==
The Cottage was the first publicly available Swedish adventure video game, as well as one of the first commercially available Swedish video games. Through the late 1970s and early 1980s, the game had a cult-like status among people with access to Oden. As people had to pay for the time they spent using Oden, the game was commercially important to QZ, leading to all three developers getting free Oden accounts; QZ's superintendent was at some point going to remove their free accounts, but reversed the decision when the developers said that they would remove The Cottage from Oden if that happened. Almost all IBM PCs in Sweden following the game's release for that platform had a copy of The Cottage, and several thousand copies of it were sold; Kann reasoned that the success came because the IBM PC was still new, and that almost no computer programs were available in Swedish at the time. Despite this, the developers did not receive a lot of money outside of the pre-paid royalties; according to Johansson, they only got 500 SEK "every once in a while". While none of them continued working on video game development, Johansson ended up working with computer business, and the Eriksson brothers became professors within computer-related fields.

Clas Kristiansson of Svenska Hemdator Hacking was positive to the game in a 1987 review, saying that it despite an "unexciting and unoriginal" setting had a pleasant atmosphere, citing creature dialogue and cryptic elements such as labyrinths and elevators as contributing factors. He criticized the indoors movement system, calling it unnecessarily complex to have two sets of commands for movement depending on where the player is and illogical to enter commands for walking backwards to go in that direction.

In his book Video Games Around the World, author Mark J.P. Wolf called the game an "impressive achievement" considering the developers' young age. Internetstiftelsen i Sverige, the organization responsible for the Swedish top-level domain .se, described the game as "legendary", and "an iconic name within the gaming community". Kristiansson called the decision to create an adventure game in Swedish commendable, and thought it could help counteract the IBM PC's stigma as not being a computer for average people in Sweden. Sigrid Nurbo at Jönköpings-Posten noted the game's absence from the 2013 video game exhibit at the Swedish National Museum of Science and Technology as odd considering its popularity and cult status.

An eight-week-long video game development camp, named "Stugan" after The Cottage's Swedish title, was held annually in Sweden between 2015 and 2018.
