= Carrier Mills Township, Saline County, Illinois =

Carrier Mills Township
- Township

- Location of Illinois in the United States
- Coordinates: 37°41′34″N 88°39′10″W
- Country: United States
- State: Illinois
- County: Saline
- Settled: November 5, 1889

Area
  - Total: 39.1 sq mi (101 km^{2})
  - Land: 37.01 sq mi (95.9 km^{2})
  - Water: 2.09 sq mi (5.4 km^{2})
- Elevation: 407 ft (124 m)

Population (2010)
  - Estimate (2016): 2,261
  - Density: 62.7/sq mi (24.2/km^{2})
- Time zone: UTC-6 (CST)
  - Summer (DST): UTC-5 (CDT)
- FIPS code: 17-165-11404

Carrier Mills Township is located in Saline County, Illinois. As of the 2010 census, its population was 2,322 and it contained 1,148 housing units.

== Geography ==
According to the 2010 census, the township has a total area of 39.1 square miles (101 km^{2}), of which 37.01 square miles (95.9 km^{2}) (or 94.65%) is land and 2.09 square miles (5.4 km^{2}) (or 5.35%) is water.

== Demographics ==
Historical population
Census	Pop.	Note	%±
2016 (est.)	2,261
U.S. Decennial Census
