= Stone Fort Township, Saline County, Illinois =

Stonefort Township
- Township
- Location in Saline County
- Coordinates: 37°37′00″N 88°40′00″W
- Country: United States
- State: Illinois
- County: Saline
- Settled: November 5, 1889

Area
  - Total: 17.77 sq mi (46.0 km^{2})
  - Land: 17.57 sq mi (45.5 km^{2})
  - Water: 0.2 sq mi (0.52 km^{2})
- Elevation: 394 ft (120 m)

Population (2010)
  - Total: 408
  - Density: 23.2/sq mi (8.97/km^{2})
- Time zone: UTC-6 (CST)
  - Summer (DST): UTC-5 (CDT)

Stonefort Township is located in Saline County, Illinois. As of the 2010 census, its population was 408 and it contained 182 housing units.

== Geography ==
According to the 2010 census, the township has a total area of 17.77 square miles (46.0 km^{2}), of which 17.57 square miles (45.5 km^{2}) (or 98.87%) is land and 0.2 square miles (0.52 km^{2}) (or 1.13%) is water.
