= Carrier Mills, Illinois =

Carrier Mills Morrilsville
- Village
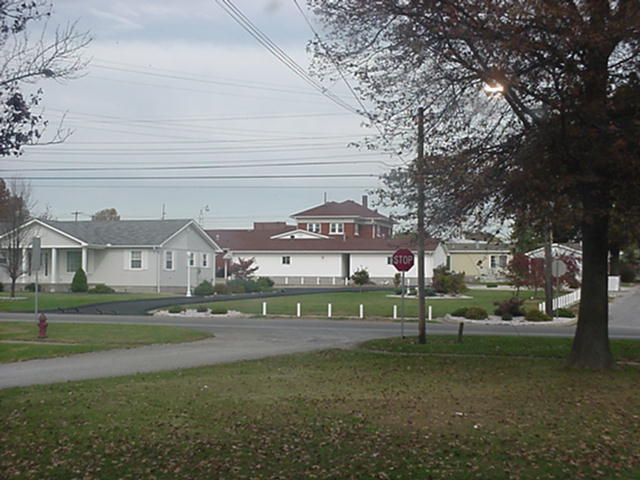
- From the high school facing north toward downtown.
- Nicknames: Catskin, The Mills, CMills, "With an s on both ends."
- Motto: Where A Friendly Smile Says Stay Awhile
- Location of Carrier Mills in Saline County, Illinois.
- Coordinates: 37°41′18″N 88°37′33″W
- Country: United States
- State: Illinois
- County: Saline
- Founded: 1872

Area
  - Total: 1.22 sq mi (3.15 km^{2})
  - Land: 1.21 sq mi (3.13 km^{2})
  - Water: 0.012 sq mi (0.03 km^{2})
- Elevation: 397 ft (121 m)

Population (2020)
  - Total: 1,672
  - Density: 1,384/sq mi (534.5/km^{2})
- Time zone: UTC-6 (CST)
  - Summer (DST): UTC-5 (CDT)
- ZIP code: 62917
- Area code: Area code 618
- FIPS code: 17-11397
- GNIS feature ID: 2397561
- Website: www.cmsf.saline.k12.il.us/main.html

Carrier Mills, formerly Carrier's Mills and Morrilsville, also known as Catskin, is a village in Saline County, Illinois, United States. The population was 1,672 at the 2020 census.

Carrier Mills was named after George Washington Carrier's saw and grist mills, and was one of the early Cairo and Vincennes Railroad boomtowns. Founded as a mill town and then a coal mining community, Carrier Mills has slowly lost 44% of its population since the 1920 census high of 3,000, due to the decline of the local coal industry. The village has primarily become a bedroom community, located seven miles (11 km) southwest of Harrisburg, which is the village's main source of employment, entertainment, and shopping. It is the third largest community in the Harrisburg Micropolitan Statistical Area outside of Eldorado and Harrisburg, and included in the Illinois-Indiana-Kentucky Tri-State Area. Carrier Mills also has a relatively large African American population (approximately 15%), reflecting historical migration from nearby Lakeview an African American community founded around 1818 that predates Carrier Mills by more than 50 years and is recognized as one of the oldest documented African American settlements in Illinois.

The village is host to the annual Catskin Days Fair and Parade, a multi-day fall festival event in October commemorating the history and culture of the village.

== History ==
The first settler in the village now known as Carrier Mills was Hampton Pankey. He was also one of the earliest settlers in Saline County. Pankey was living in the area in 1804 or 1805 and he registered his land deed in 1814, the earliest date that was available to register them. In about 1811 the settlers began building blockhouses for protection from American Indians. A blockhouse was built on his land around this time. One of his sons was John Pankey, who was one of the founding fathers of Harrisburg.

Long before the founding of Carrier Mills, the nearby community of Lakeview had become one of the earliest settled areas in present-day Saline County. Established around 1818, Lakeview developed into what is recognized as one of the oldest documented African American settlement in Illinois. By 1870, two years before the village's survey, the community had grown to an estimated population of 101. By 1880 Lakeview had a population on 128, making it larger than neighboring Morrillsville (now Carrier Mills), which recorded a population of 105 that year.

The village was surveyed by Benjamin D Lewis and platted in November 1872 for William Housely as Morrillsville, named after H. L. Morrill, the Cairo and Vincennes Railroad superintendent who sealed a real estate deal with mill owner G. W. Carrier.

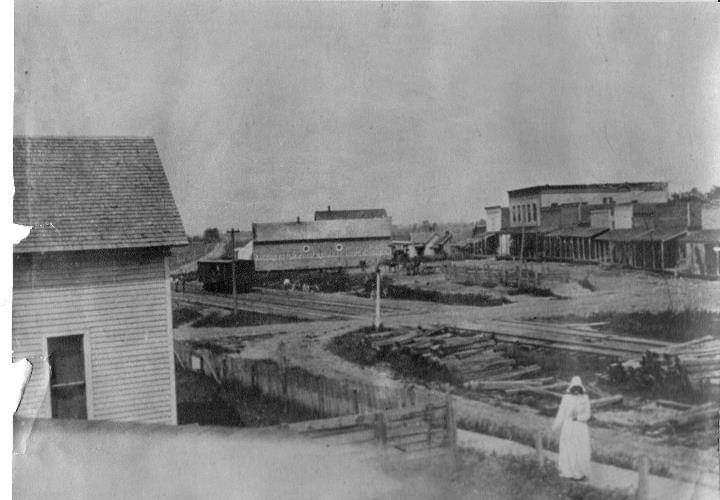
Earliest known photo of Downtown Carrier Mills from Walnut Street, 1905.

It was commonly known as, and eventually renamed, Carrier's Mills after inventor G. Washington Carrier ("Uncle Wash") who helped found the town when he built an elaborate steam powered saw mill and a grist mill just to the south of town on the Saline River watershed, near the old Tuller Mansion farming and property site. Carrier's Mills was the farthest north cypress trees grew at the time, which made lumber milling in the town profitable. Carrier was the first of many to set up wood working factories within the city limits. The mills were first used for the making of lumber to construct bridges and ties for the Cairo and Vincennes Railroad, then later the businesses and homes in the town soon followed.

Downtown Carrier Mills in 1939.

Carrier and Morrill closed a real estate deal to build a train depot there. The town was platted adjacent and north of the newly completed Cairo and Vincennes Railroad. In 1873, the first postmaster was appointed to Carrier's Mills (the name the railroad had assigned to the new stop). The town's name changed again to "Carrier Mills" when several more woodworking factories were built. The village was incorporated on September 18, 1894. After an influx of settlers from the south, due to the Civil War, the tiny village amidst timber and farms grew quickly. Today, in legal documents its name remains Morrillsville. Carrier Mills did not have a single brick building and the sidewalks were of boards. The business district was mainly on Oak Street from the First National Bank west to the Texaco Gas Station, and all of frame construction. A disastrous fire in February 1908 burned everything on the north side of Oak Street. In March 1908, fire burned everything on the south side of the street, from Main to Mill, except the Old Woolcott Mill Exchange. The businessmen began immediately to rebuild, all of brick construction.

Tuller Mansion, or "Tuller Place" was a Victorian, 1910, two-story manor, constructed of red brick from the Terre Haute Block Company built on the outskirts of town. There was a grand entry staircase with marble floors, clawfoot tubs, built-in china cabinets, and fine mahogany wood throughout. A large, elegant patio served to entertain guests in hosting social dances, and even a carport existed for the two vehicles that Tuller owned. The mansion was built on the Carrier-Vennum estate, nicknamed "Inland Farm", by Arthur V. Tuller, inlaw of George Washington Carrier, the town's founder. The house burned in the 1990s.

After the lumber boom died out, Coal mining had a great influence on Carrier Mills. Over one hundred coal mines were privately and publicly operated around Carrier Mills between near the turn of the 20th century and the late 1990s. from 1913 to 1933, was the southern terminus of the Southern Illinois Railway & Power Company's Interurban Line. The trolley would take residents from downtown, and along Carline Street toward Harrisburg. During the town's heyday, some 3,000 people bustled around the busy streets. After the coal mines closed the population dwindled to nearly 1,500 according to the 2010 census. The entire county had its population decline due to the closing of the coal mines, making Carrier Mills a near ghost town. In 2009 Carrier Mills ended a 70-year-long prohibition. During the 2012 Leap Day tornado outbreak an EF-4 tornado touched down just north of Carrier Mills at 4:51 a.m. on February 29, 2012, destroyed a church and damaged homes along Town Park Road and then traveled ENE toward Harrisburg, where it damaged and destroyed entire neighborhoods of the city.

=== Local school history ===
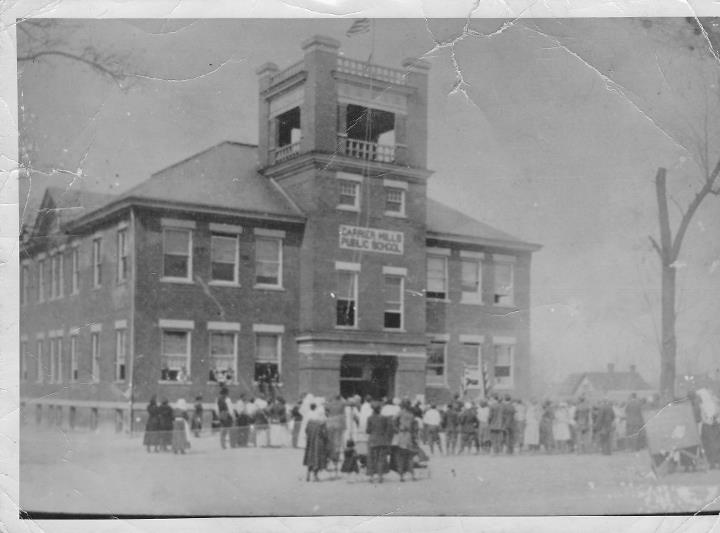
First Carrier Mills Public School in 1905. This building burned and was rebuilt in 1938.

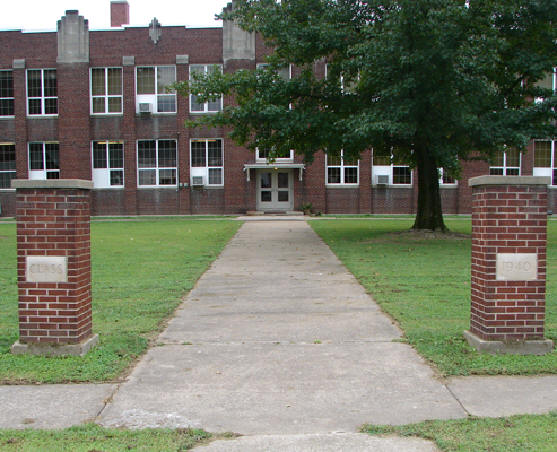
Carrier Mills High School, erected 1940.

The first school in Carrier Mills was a large, two-story wooden structure with a bell tower. It was built in the early 1820s and located near the old Sahara Coal Company preparation plant (now abandoned), just northwest of the village.

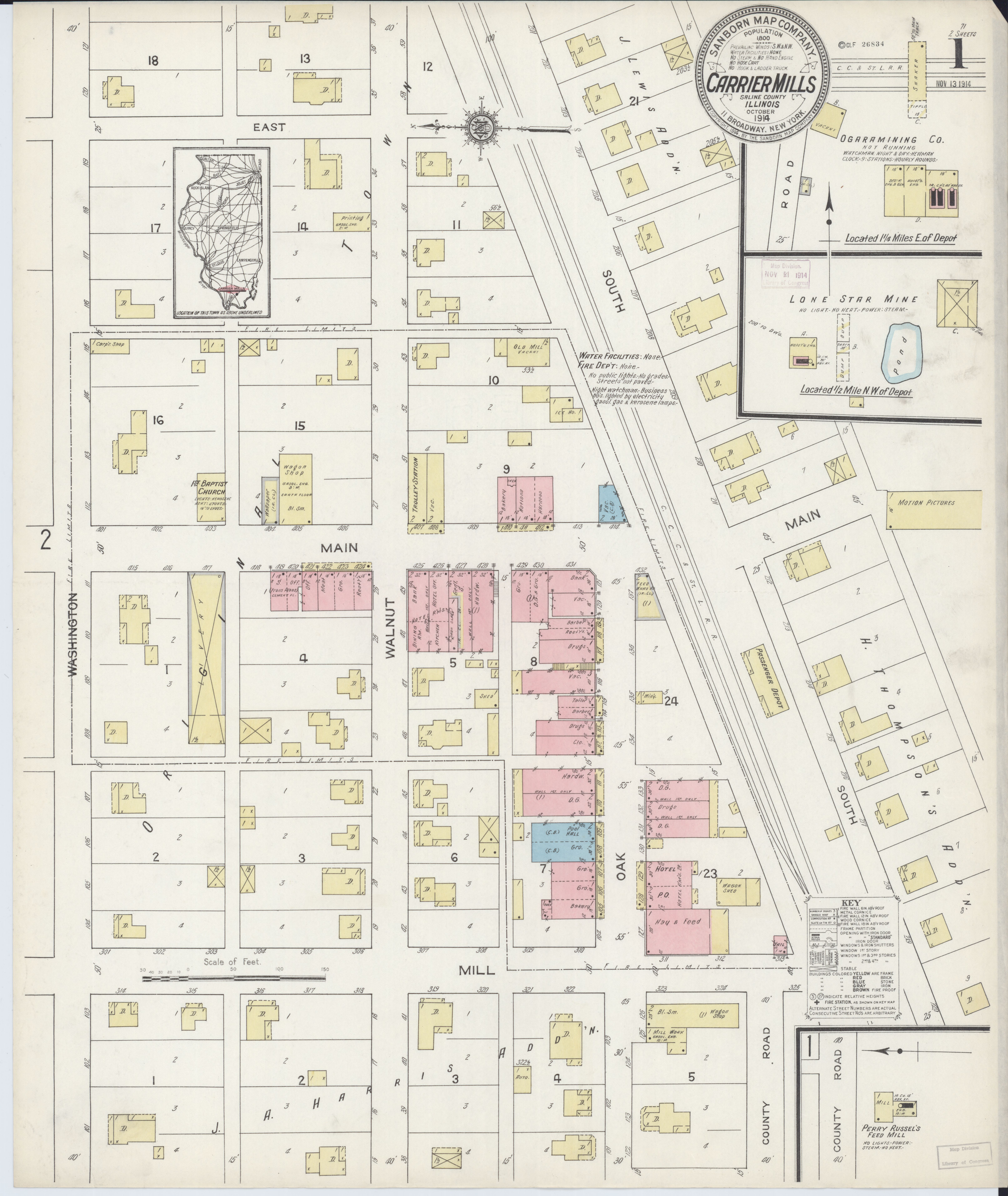
Carrier Mills traditional business district with listed buildings, 1914.

The little structure was made of logs and had a clay chimney. School year began in August and ended in October because of the extreme cold. A typical school in 1850 was a subscription school - a fee of $2.50 was charged for a two-month period. From the Civil War period until 1875, the only formal school was located near Salem.

In 1887, the first school building in Carrier Mills Village was purchased for the purpose of being a prescription school at the corner of Walnut and Main St. The first major public school in the town was opened in 1903 on Furlong St. The first recognized two-year high school course was started in 1915. In 1917, the high school became a registered three-year high school until 1926 when it became a community high school fully accredited by the state of Illinois.

Around 1940, the Carrier Mills Public School building burned down after a disastrous fire starting during a Boy Scout meeting in the basement. A much larger school was built a year later as a grade school around the frame of the first burnt school.

On February 4, 1938, the present High School was completed and occupied, with the gymnasium and auditorium added in 1940. The current enlarged gym was built in 1950–51. At the beginning of 1963, the small town of Stonefort joined the Carrier Mills school district creating the Carrier Mills-Stonefort Unit 2 School District.

=== Downtown abandonment ===
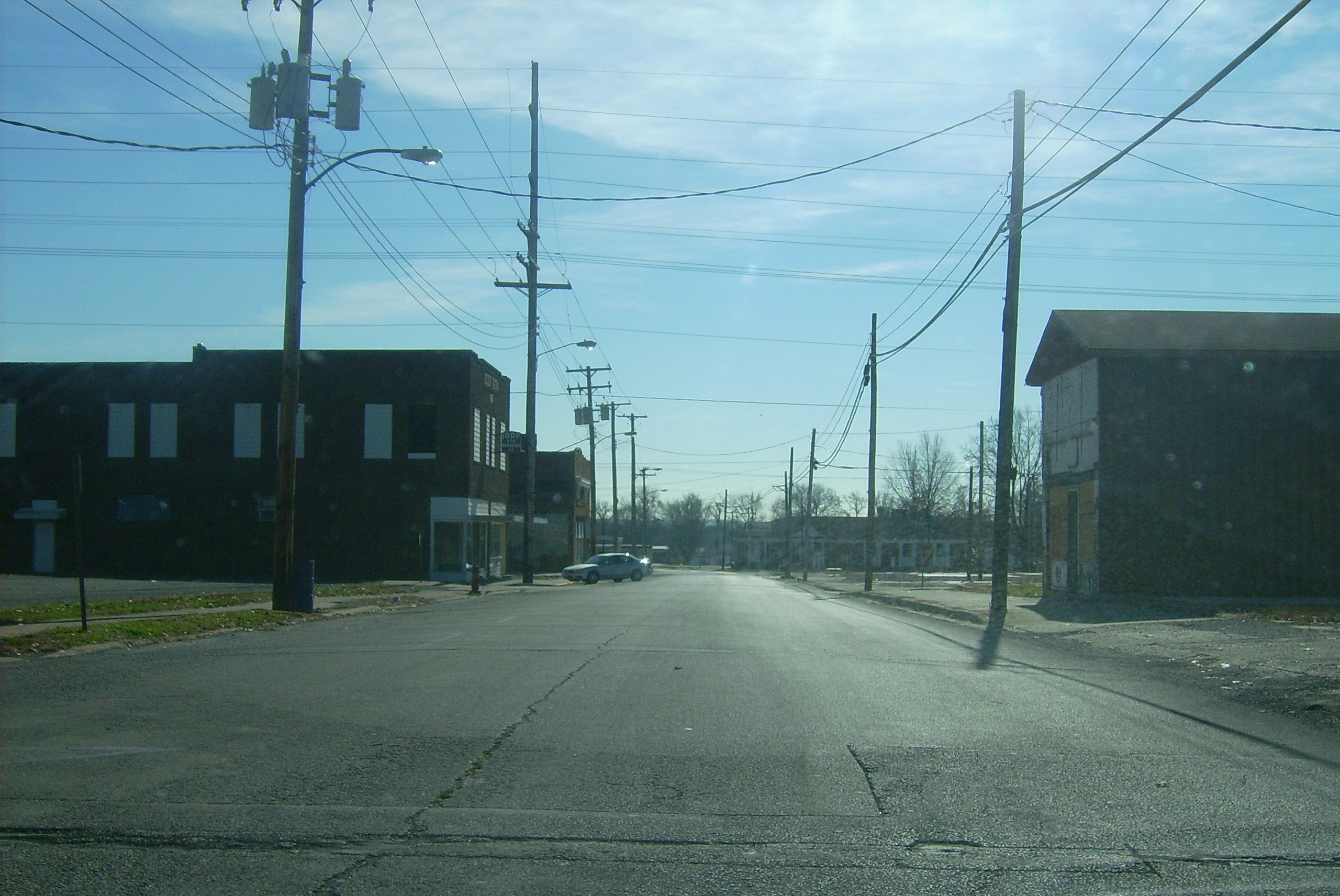
The town's once heavily traveled Main Street (looking south from Baptist Church) by 2006 had been reduced to just a few buildings.

The traditional downtown business district in Carrier Mills stretched from Route 45 down Main Street to Washington Street, and down Oak and Railroad streets between Main Street and Mill Street, but by July 2006, most of the Carrier Mills downtown was condemned and demolished by the city. Citizens of Carrier Mills said it was better to see empty lots than rotten buildings. Most citizens found it sad that it had to come to such a conclusion.

The business district has been in a slow decline for at least 25 years. No single big event can be tied to the decline of downtown Carrier Mills. Will Scarlet Mine closed in 1987. Sahara's mines closed in 1993, putting hundreds out of work. Each of those closures reverberated through the local economy. Sahara had a reputation for buying locally—when their purchasing ceased it was a big blow to local businesses. But the Carrier Mills downtown area slowly declining even before the big mine closures.

In its heyday, Carrier Mills was home to several hotels, two theaters (The Knox, and the Grand Theater, opened in 1936 and closed in 1970), two banks (Dodds Bank and the First National), several stores and markets. Nearly all have been slowly torn or burned down over the past 20 years.

There were small stores on Friend, Main, East End and Washington Streets—in some instances a small store could be found every few blocks. The small grocery stores gradually shut down as car ownership increased and people were therefore more mobile—something that contributed generally to the decline of small towns like Carrier Mills.

A new building ordinance was set in July 2006 for future construction plans in the vacant downtown area. According to Mayor Louis Shaw, "What we're concerned about is when you walk into town, it doesn't look like a farm."

In April 2007, Carrier Mills Village Board approved entering an agreement with Bob Vancil and Associates to set up a tax increment finance district in an effort to draw new homeowners and businesses. The TIF district is a chance for the village to increase the quality of life with new houses and incentives for improving houses that are in disrepair. Village Board members described establishing the TIF district as a roll of the dice. Vancil will set up the TIF for $15,000 with $5,000 paid up front. If the Scarlet Lake annexation does not happen and the board learns the TIF will not be of benefit to the village, they will not owe the additional $10,000. Vancil said the village will be responsible for paying $3,000 in legal requirements for the TIF, which include giving notice to all businesses and legal advertising in newspapers.

The Scarlet Lake subdivision is a series of 52 lots within the old Will Scarlet strip pit mining area. It will be added to the Village limits as part of the TIF/Annexation project.

In June 2011, the two-story Field and Dime Store building collapsed in Carrier Mills due to disrepair, one of only four original downtown structures that remained in the village.

=== Lakeview (Pond Settlement) ===
Carrier Mills has a great African American history and influence. Free blacks founded the small early pioneer settlement of Lakeview, a mile south of Carrier Mills, shortly after the War of 1812. The History of Saline County (published by Saline County Genealogical Society in 1997) states that "Lakeview, a colored community south of town (Carrier Mills), is an older settlement than Carrier Mills. It is the oldest black settlement in Illinois. It was first named Pond Settlement because of the swamp land that surrounded it. According to local tradition free blacks living in the Pond Settlement helped runaway slaves and indentured servants escape from the saline works and the Old Slave House near Equality, Illinois.

Lakeview had its own school and grocery store along with many homes. In 1850, a Union Church was established near Carrier Mills in Saline County, Illinois. Most members were either Baptist or Methodist. An African Methodist Episcopal Church was organized at the home of Irvin Allen, who built a one-room log church building on his property. After the church burned, the congregation rebuilt and moved the church to Carrier Mills, where it sits today. This congregation is now Baber Chapel AME Church. The Lakeview cemetery has become a state historical landmark. The area of Lakeview is still a nearly 100% black area. After the closure of the Lakeview school in the 1950s, many people moved to the east side of Carrier Mills, named "East End" by locals and in the Carrier Mills Register newspaper. There was much tension felt between the white and black populations in the town.

In 2022 a preliminary application for a federal historical designation district was submitted by Lakeview descendant Brendan Jennings. The Saline County Tourism Board voted to create a committee to spearhead the project.

In 2023 the Illinois Department of Natural Resources (IDNR) was awarded a $75,000 grant from the National Park Service to recognize significant African American heritage properties in southern Illinois. It was a collaborative effort between the Illinois State Historic Preservation Office, a division of the Illinois Department of Natural Resources, and the Center for Archaeological Investigations at Southern Illinois University to be used to produce National Register nominations for three resources associated with Black history in southern Illinois. Additionally, the project will amend the existing National Register nominations for the following sites including the Carrier Mills Archaeological District, to reflect the African American heritage of the Pond Settlement, also known as Lakeview.

In 2025, Lakeview was featured in an Illinois Humanities program discussing the area’s historical connection to the family of former Chicago mayor Harold Washington. Washington’s mother, Bertha Jones, was raised in Lakeview before the family moved to Chicago. In 2026, descendants of the Lakeview community and local preservation advocates organized a Memorial Day weekend event at Lakeview Cemetery to highlight the history of the settlement and ongoing preservation efforts. The event included historical presentations, cemetery tours, and discussion of efforts to identify and preserve unmarked graves associated with the historic African American community. Southern Illinois University Carbondale’s Morris Library has identified Lakeview, historically also known as Pond Settlement, as one of Southern Illinois’ antebellum free Black communities through its “Reclaiming the African American Heritage of Southern Illinois Project.” In 2026, SIU Carbondale launched a six-week archaeology field school in the Lakeview community led by anthropology professor Matthew C. Greer. The project focused on investigating an Allen family farmstead believed to date to the 1840s, along with surveys of potentially older settlement sites and ground-penetrating radar studies at Lakeview Cemetery to help identify unmarked graves.

=== Carrier Mills Archaeological District ===
The area, some 143 acres (0.58 km^{2}) located approximately two miles south of Carrier Mills was inhabited by prehistoric people in three different archaeological periods. Until the start of the 20th century, the South Fork of the Saline River was a meandering stream with large areas of swamps and shallow cypress lakes nearby. These areas were rich in plants and animals that prehistoric inhabitants sought for food. Therefore, the locality became a natural focal point for human settlement. In 1978 and 1979, archeologists intensively investigated this area. Excellent preservation conditions permitted the recovery of many tools and animal and plant remains that have provided significant new insights into the prehistory of southern Illinois.

Sporadic use of the area by small groups of hunters and gatherers can be dated to 8000 BC, and the area was used more or less continuously until 1400 AD. Settlement activity increased dramatically during the late Middle Archaic Period, 4500 to 3000 BC, when the area was inhabited by larger groups with a more settled lifestyle. These occupants left archaeological evidence containing many artifacts and burials. The area also saw heavy use during the Middle and Late Woodland periods, 200 BC to 900 AD. The peoples of those times increasingly focused on the collection and storage of plant foods and began to domesticate some native plants. The final prehistoric inhabitants were Mississippian Period Indians (900 to 1400) who lived in scattered farmsteads and cultivated corn and squash.

== Catskin Days ==
Carrier Mills has been nicknamed "Catskin" due to both an abundance of stray cats in town, and a late-19th century story of the first local merchandise and liquor store owner, Wes Cole, who was tricked by local kids into thinking a skinned cat hide was a mink stole in trade for a jug of whiskey. To this day The village is host to the annual Catskin Days Fair and Parade, a multi-day fall festival event in October commemorating the rich history and culture of the village. The township's school mascot is also the Wildcat.

== Geography ==
According to the 2010 census, Carrier Mills has a total area of 1.221 square miles (3.16 km^{2}), of which 1.21 square miles (3.13 km^{2}) (or 99.1%) is land and 0.011 square miles (0.03 km^{2}) (or 0.9%) is water.

Carrier Mills sits upon a heavily undermined hillside that overlooks a shallow flatland to the south, where its sister community of Lakeview was built in a region of swampy land drained by the South Fork of the Saline River. In the distance, two ridges of the Shawnee Hills can be seen from town in a distinct blue haze.

The village is split into two distinct sections with Washington Street being the only main east–west oriented avenue connecting them. In between the two sections is the elevated New York Central Railroad bed, now the Tunnel Hill State Trail, on a large swath of grass, and the now defunct streetcar bypass on Carline Street, splitting the village in a southwest to northeast angle. Downtown is located in the southwest corner, the largest section of the village to the northwest, and East End to the southeast, US Route 45 borders the southern edge, giving Carrier Mills its distinctive 'L' shape.

== Demographics ==
Historical population
| Census | Pop. | Note | %± |
|---|---|---|---|
| 1900 | 427 | | — |
| 1910 | 1,558 | | 264.9% |
| 1920 | 3,000 | | 92.6% |
| 1930 | 2,140 | | −28.7% |
| 1940 | 2,360 | | 10.3% |
| 1950 | 2,252 | | −4.6% |
| 1960 | 2,006 | | −10.9% |
| 1970 | 2,013 | | 0.3% |
| 1980 | 2,268 | | 12.7% |
| 1990 | 1,991 | | −12.2% |
| 2000 | 1,886 | | −5.3% |
| 2010 | 1,655 | | −12.2% |
| 2020 | 1,672 | | 1.0% |
Decennial US Census

=== 2020 census ===
As of the 2020 census, Carrier Mills had a population of 1,672. The median age was 44.3 years. 21.8% of residents were under the age of 18 and 23.7% of residents were 65 years of age or older. For every 100 females there were 92.2 males, and for every 100 females age 18 and over there were 88.6 males age 18 and over.

0.0% of residents lived in urban areas, while 100.0% lived in rural areas.

There were 707 households in Carrier Mills, of which 27.6% had children under the age of 18 living in them. Of all households, 38.6% were married-couple households, 20.4% were households with a male householder and no spouse or partner present, and 35.8% were households with a female householder and no spouse or partner present. About 36.2% of all households were made up of individuals and 18.8% had someone living alone who was 65 years of age or older.

There were 816 housing units, of which 13.4% were vacant. The homeowner vacancy rate was 1.3% and the rental vacancy rate was 7.2%.

Racial composition as of the 2020 census
| Race | Number | Percent |
|---|---|---|
| White | 1,349 | 80.7% |
| Black or African American | 186 | 11.1% |
| American Indian and Alaska Native | 10 | 0.6% |
| Asian | 5 | 0.3% |
| Native Hawaiian and Other Pacific Islander | 0 | 0.0% |
| Some other race | 14 | 0.8% |
| Two or more races | 108 | 6.5% |
| Hispanic or Latino (of any race) | 35 | 2.1% |

=== 2010 census ===
As of the census of 2010, there were 1,653 people, 744 households, and 463 families residing in the Village. The population density was 1,522.9 inhabitants per square mile (588.0/km^{2}). There were 866 housing units at an average density of 760.6 per square mile (293.7/km^{2}). The racial makeup of the village was 86.6% White, 14.8% African American, 0.5% Native American, 0.4% Asian, 0.1% from other races, and 1.27% from two or more races. Hispanic or Latino of any race were 0.90% of the population.

There were 744 households, out of which 25.7% had children under the age of 18, 43.4% were married couples living together, 15.1% had a female householder with no husband present, and 37.8% were non-families. 34.0% of all households were made up of individuals, and 16.1% had someone living alone who was 65 years of age or older. The average household size was 2.22 and the average family size was 2.80.

In the village, the population was spread out, with 21.2% under the age of 18, 8.9% aged 18 to 24, 23.2% from 25 to 44, 22.6% from 45 to 64, and 24.0% 65 years of age or older. The median age was 42 years. For every 100 females, there were 84.5 males. For every 100 females aged 18 and over, there were 81.2 males.

The median household income was $25,493, and the family median income was $35,037. Males had a median income of $31,458 compared to $16,756 for females. The per capita income for the village was $14,314. About 13.2% of families and 17.7% of the population were living below the poverty line, including 23.4% of those under age 18 and 16.7% of those aged 65 or over.

== See also ==
- Southern Illinois
- Mill town
- History of coal mining in the United States
