= Rector Township, Saline County, Illinois =

Rector Township
- Township

- Location of Illinois in the United States
- Coordinates: 37°53′12″N 88°25′52″W
- Country: United States
- State: Illinois
- County: Saline
- Settled: November 5, 1889

Area
  - Total: 18.25 sq mi (47.3 km^{2})
  - Land: 18.19 sq mi (47.1 km^{2})
  - Water: 0.06 sq mi (0.16 km^{2})
- Elevation: 358 ft (109 m)

Population (2010)
  - Estimate (2016): 64
  - Density: 3.6/sq mi (1.4/km^{2})
- Time zone: UTC-6 (CST)
  - Summer (DST): UTC-5 (CDT)
- FIPS code: 17-165-63030

Rector Township is located in Saline County, Illinois. As of the 2010 census, its population was 65 and it contained 39 housing units.

== Geography ==
According to the 2010 census, the township has a total area of 18.25 square miles (47.3 km^{2}), of which 0.06 sq mi (0.16 km^{2}) (or 0.33%) is covered by water.

== Demographics ==
Historical population
Census	Pop.	Note	%±
2016 (est.)	64
U.S. Decennial Census
