= East Eldorado Township, Saline County, Illinois =

East Eldorado Township
- Township
- Location of Illinois in the United States
- Coordinates: 37°49′14″N 88°25′46″W
- Country: United States
- State: Illinois
- County: Saline
- Settled: November 5, 1889

Government
  - Road Commissioner: Woody Hathaway
  - Supervisor: Noah Boulds

Area
  - Total: 36.69 sq mi (95.0 km^{2})
  - Land: 36.47 sq mi (94.5 km^{2})
  - Water: 0.21 sq mi (0.54 km^{2})
- Elevation: 407 ft (124 m)

Population (2010)
  - Estimate (2016): 5,753
  - Density: 161.9/sq mi (62.5/km^{2})
- Time zone: UTC-6 (CST)
  - Summer (DST): UTC-5 (CDT)
- FIPS code: 17-165-21709

East Eldorado Township is located in Saline County, Illinois. As of the 2010 census, its population was 5,906 and it contained 2,859 housing units.

== Geography ==
According to the 2010 census, the township has a total area of 36.69 square miles (95.0 km^{2}), of which 36.47 square miles (94.5 km^{2}) (or 99.40%) is land and 0.21 square miles (0.54 km^{2}) (or 0.57%) is water.

== Demographics ==
Historical population
Census	Pop.	Note	%±
2016 (est.)	5,753
U.S. Decennial Census
