= Silent 700 =

Line of Texas Instruments portable computer terminals (1970s and 1980s)

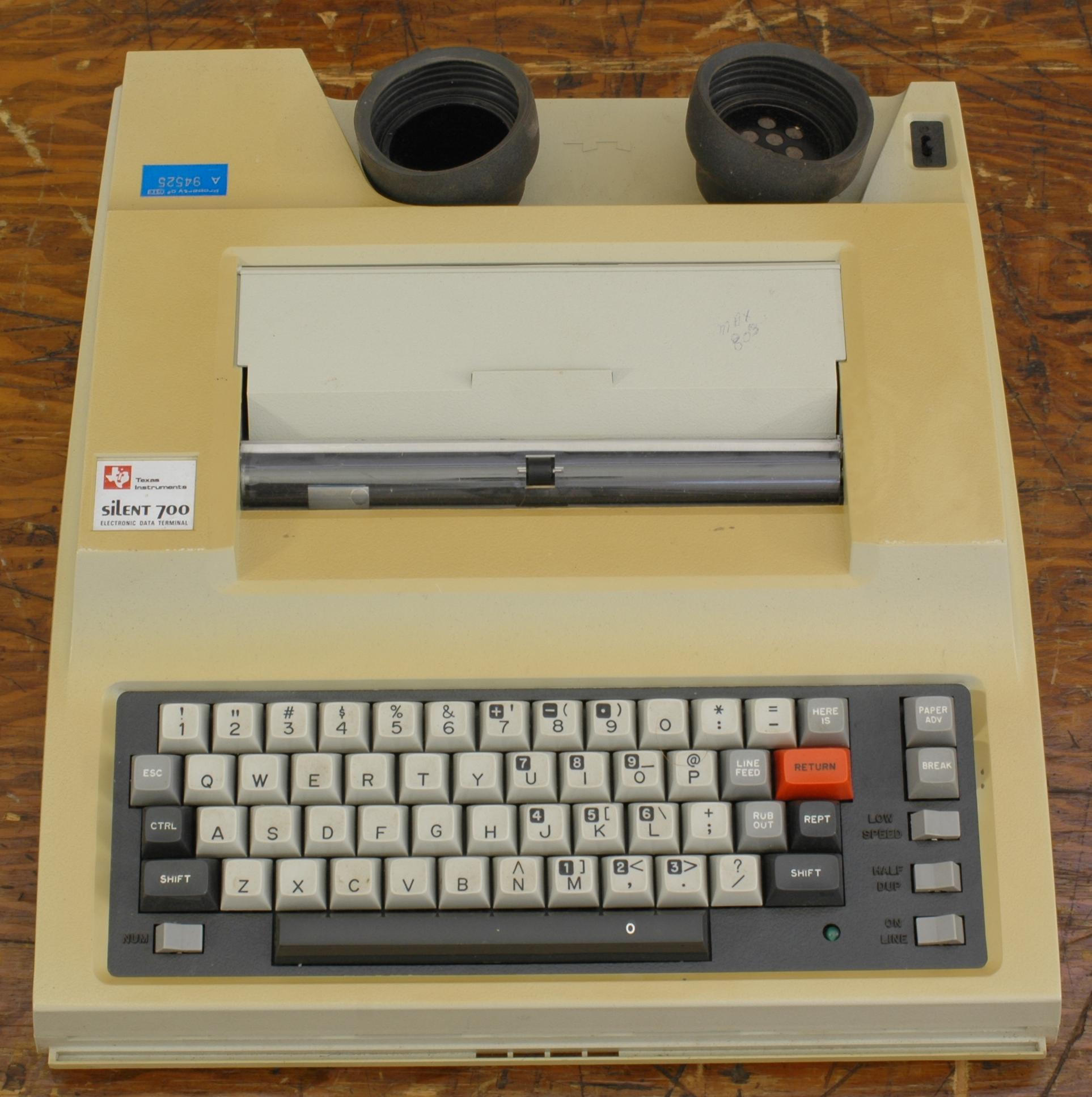
Silent-700 Terminal

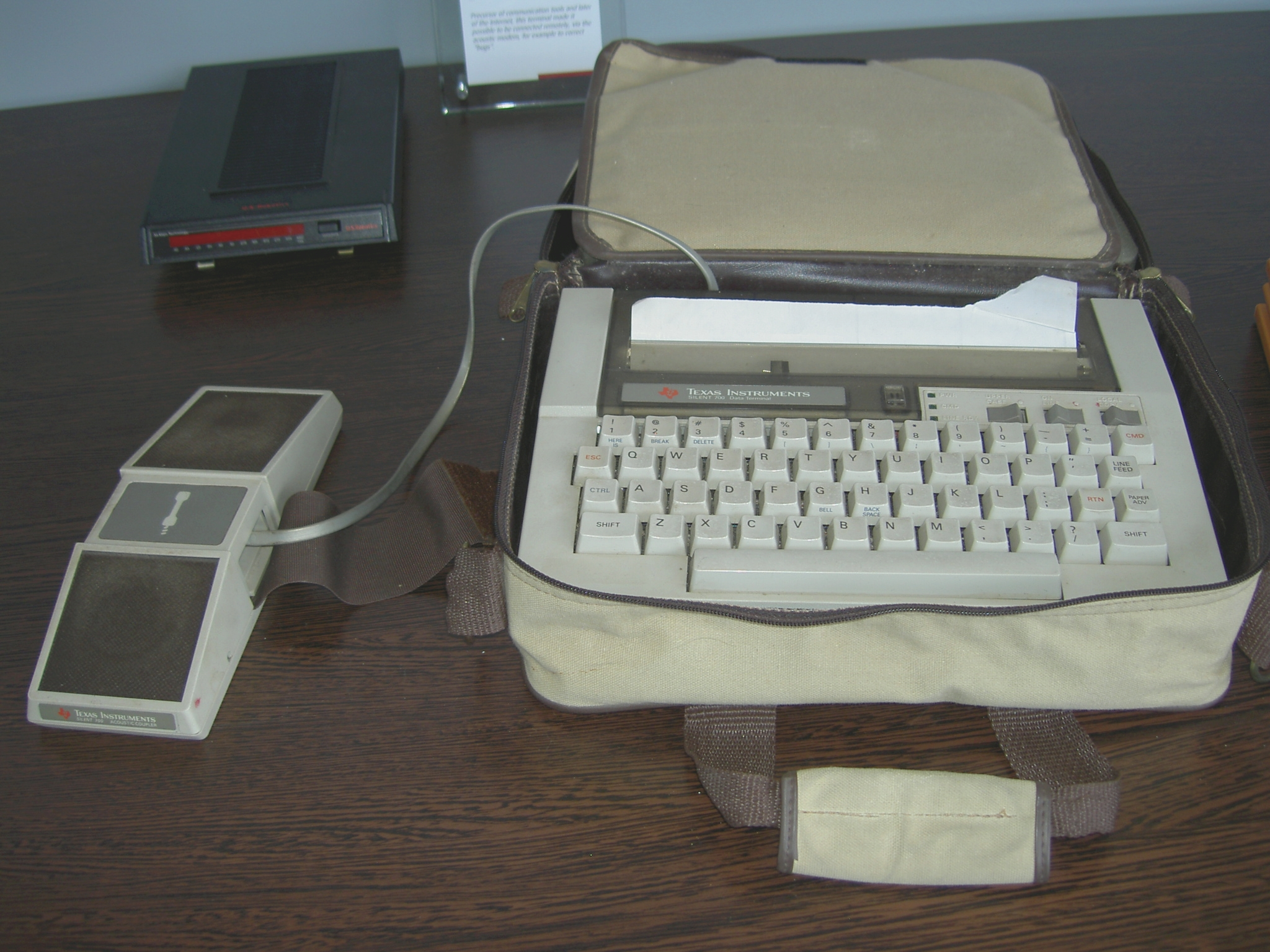
Silent Writer 700

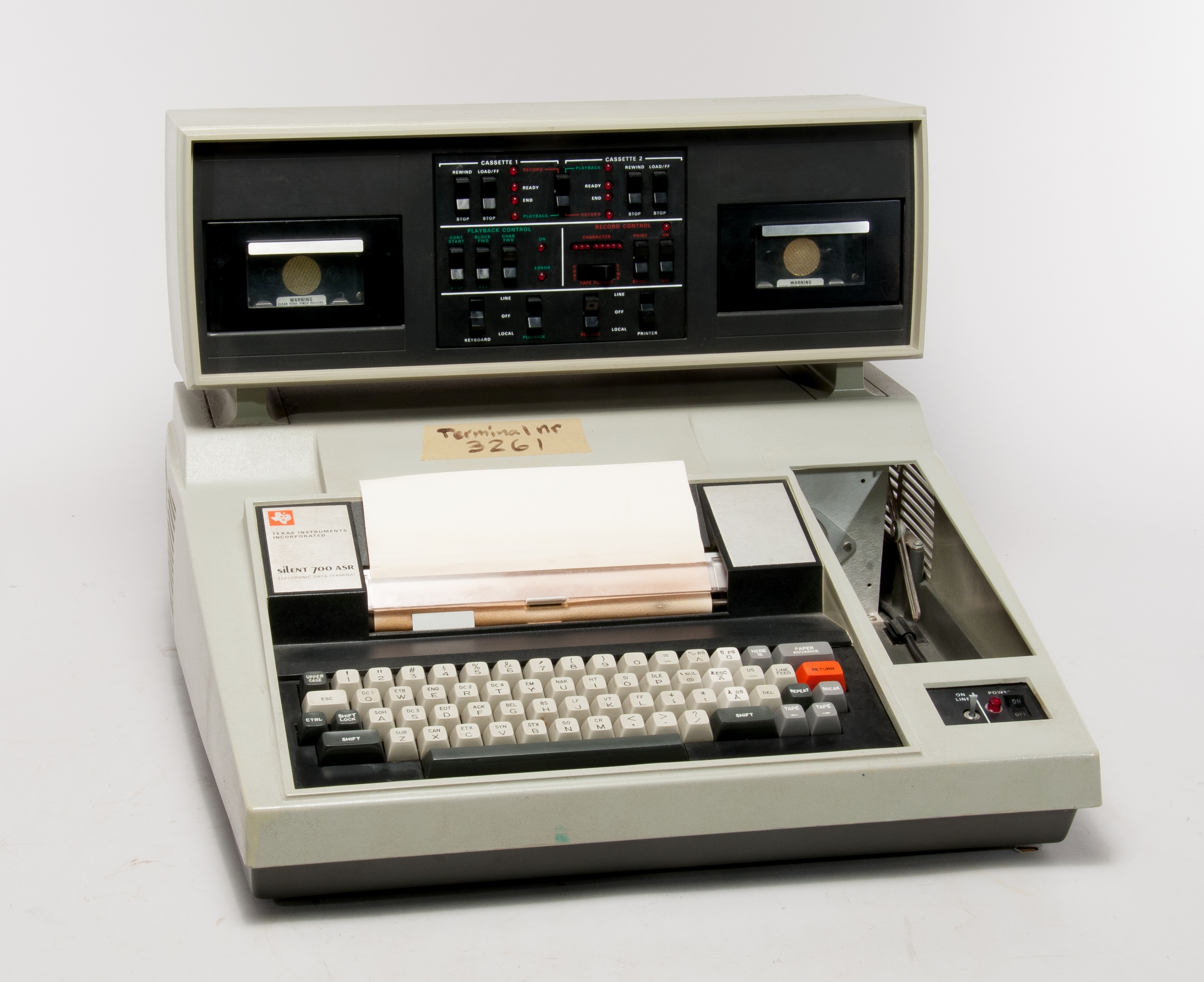
Silent 732 ASR with tape drives

The Silent 700, introduced in 1971, was a line of portable computer terminals manufactured by Texas Instruments in the 1970s and 1980s. Silent 700s printed with a 5 × 7 dot-matrix heating element onto a roll of heat-sensitive paper. Some models were equipped with an integrated acoustic coupler and modem that could receive data at 30 characters per second. Other models could be directly connected to computers at 300 bits per second (bit/s), and were sometimes used as the system console where a hard copy record of the activities would be retained for a period of time.

== Local capabilities ==
A pair of local tape cartridge devices were included in some models, and data could be edited, tape-to-tape, for later transmission.

== Model 725 ==
The Model 725 added the ability to switch-select bit rates of 110, 150 and 300, corresponding to 10, 15 or 30 characters per second.

== Model 745 ==
The Model 745 was introduced late 1975 as "the lightest-weight portable now available."

== 1200 bit/s ==
As 1200 bit/s dialup communication became more common among Time-sharing providers, the Silent 700 faced the problem that its printhead technology simply couldn't "heat up all the little dots" at 120 characters per second. TI solved this in their 780-series terminals by creating a two-character-wide thermal head, which printed 60 pairs of characters per second. This allowed the product line to survive a few more years in the new high-speed interactive computing environment of the mid-1980s.
