= Brushy Township, Saline County, Illinois =

Brushy Township
- Township

- Location of Illinois in the United States
- Coordinates: 37°46′33″N 88°39′10″W
- Country: United States
- State: Illinois
- County: Saline
- Settled: November 5, 1889

Area
  - Total: 34.32 sq mi (88.9 km^{2})
  - Land: 33.82 sq mi (87.6 km^{2})
  - Water: 0.5 sq mi (1.3 km^{2})
- Elevation: 400 ft (120 m)

Population (2010)
  - Estimate (2016): 741
  - Density: 22.6/sq mi (8.7/km^{2})
- Time zone: UTC-6 (CST)
  - Summer (DST): UTC-5 (CDT)
- FIPS code: 17-165-09122

Brushy Township is located in Saline County, Illinois. As of the 2010 census, its population was 766 and it contained 325 housing units.

== Geography ==
According to the 2010 census, the township has a total area of 34.32 square miles (88.9 km^{2}), of which 33.82 square miles (87.6 km^{2}) (or 98.54%) is land and 0.5 square miles (1.3 km^{2}) (or 1.46%) is water.

== Demographics ==
Historical population
| Census | Pop. | Note | %± |
|---|---|---|---|
| 2016 (est.) | 741 |
U.S. Decennial Census
