= Saline County, Illinois =

County in Illinois, United States

- County
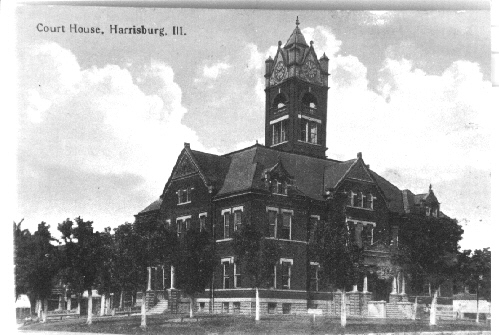
- Former Saline County Courthouse in Harrisburg

- Flag Seal

- Location within the U.S. state of Illinois
- Coordinates: 37°45′N 88°32′W
- Country: United States
- State: Illinois
- Founded: 1847
- Named for: Saline River
- Seat: Harrisburg
- Largest city: Harrisburg

Area
  - Total: 387 sq mi (1,000 km^{2})
  - Land: 380 sq mi (980 km^{2})
  - Water: 7.0 sq mi (18 km^{2}) 1.8%

Population (2020)
  - Total: 23,768
  - Estimate (2025): 22,772 ▼
  - Density: 63/sq mi (24/km^{2})
- Time zone: UTC−6 (Central)
  - Summer (DST): UTC−5 (CDT)
- Congressional district: 12th
- Website: www.salinecounty.illinois.gov

Saline County is a county in Southern Illinois. At the 2020 census, it had a population of 23,768. The largest city and county seat is Harrisburg. This area of Southern Illinois is known locally as "Little Egypt."

Three major towns in Saline County are connected by U.S. Route 45, and formerly by the now-abandoned Cairo and Vincennes/Big Four/New York Central Line, from north to south: Eldorado, Harrisburg, and Carrier Mills.

== Geography ==
According to the U.S. Census Bureau, the county has a total area of 387 square miles (1,000 km^{2}), of which 380 square miles (980 km^{2}) is land and 7.0 square miles (18 km^{2}) (1.8%) is water.

The Saline County area is mostly rolling hills throughout gradually rising to the Hills of the Shawnee National Forest. The Saline River flows through the central point of the county in three forks: North, Middle, and South. To the north of Eldorado there are flat lowlands.

=== Climate and weather ===
Harrisburg, Illinois

Climate chart (precipitation, max. and min. temperature)
J	F	M	A	M	J	J	A	S	O	N	D
3.2 40 22	3.1 46 25	4.4 57 35	4.6 68 45	5 77 54	4.5 85 63	3.9 89 68	3.2 88 65	3 81 57	3 70 44	4.2 56 36	3.9 45 26
- █ Average max. and min. temperatures in °F
- █ Precipitation totals in inches
- Source: The Weather Channel
Metric conversion
J	F	M	A	M	J	J	A	S	O	N	D
81 4 −6	78 8 −4	113 14 2	118 20 7	126 25 12	114 29 17	100 32 20	82 31 18	77 27 14	77 21 7	107 13 2	99 7 −3
- █ Average max. and min. temperatures in °C
- █ Precipitation totals in mm

In recent years, average temperatures in the county seat of Harrisburg have ranged from a low of 22 °F (−6 °C) in January to a high of 89 °F (32 °C) in July, although a record low of −23 °F (−31 °C) was recorded in February 1951 and a record high of 113 °F (45 °C) was recorded in July 1936. Average monthly precipitation ranged from 3.04 inches (77 mm) in September to 4.98 inches (126 mm) in May.

=== Adjacent counties ===
- Hamilton County (north)
- White County (northeast)
- Gallatin County (east)
- Hardin County (southeast)
- Pope County (south)
- Johnson County (southwest)
- Williamson County (west)
- Franklin County (northwest)

=== National protected area ===
- Shawnee National Forest (part)

=== State protected areas ===
- Sahara Woods State Fish and Wildlife Area
- Saline County State Fish and Wildlife Area

== Transportation ==
=== Transit ===
- Rides Mass Transit District

=== Major highways ===
- U.S. Highway 45
- Illinois Route 13
- Illinois Route 34
- Illinois Route 142
- Illinois Route 145

== Demographics ==
Historical population
Census	Pop.	Note	%±
1850	5,588		—
1860	9,331		67.0%
1870	12,714		36.3%
1880	15,940		25.4%
1890	19,342		21.3%
1900	21,685		12.1%
1910	30,204		39.3%
1920	38,353		27.0%
1930	37,100		−3.3%
1940	38,066		2.6%
1950	33,420		−12.2%
1960	26,227		−21.5%
1970	25,721		−1.9%
1980	28,448		10.6%
1990	26,551		−6.7%
2000	26,733		0.7%
2010	24,913		−6.8%
2020	23,768		−4.6%
2025 (est.)	22,772	▼	−4.2%
U.S. Decennial Census; 1790-1960 1900-1990; 1990-2000 2010-2013

=== 2020 census ===
As of the 2020 census, the county had a population of 23,768. The median age was 43.2 years. 22.3% of residents were under the age of 18 and 21.7% of residents were 65 years of age or older. For every 100 females there were 98.1 males, and for every 100 females age 18 and over there were 95.4 males age 18 and over.

The racial makeup of the county was 90.4% White, 2.9% Black or African American, 0.3% American Indian and Alaska Native, 0.5% Asian, <0.1% Native Hawaiian and Pacific Islander, 0.8% from some other race, and 5.0% from two or more races. Hispanic or Latino residents of any race comprised 2.0% of the population.

34.8% of residents lived in urban areas, while 65.2% lived in rural areas.

There were 9,996 households in the county, of which 27.6% had children under the age of 18 living in them. Of all households, 43.6% were married-couple households, 20.5% were households with a male householder and no spouse or partner present, and 29.4% were households with a female householder and no spouse or partner present. About 33.7% of all households were made up of individuals and 16.5% had someone living alone who was 65 years of age or older.

There were 11,576 housing units, of which 13.6% were vacant. Among occupied housing units, 72.2% were owner-occupied and 27.8% were renter-occupied. The homeowner vacancy rate was 3.5% and the rental vacancy rate was 10.6%.

=== Racial and ethnic composition ===
Saline County, Illinois – Racial and ethnic composition Note: the US Census treats Hispanic/Latino as an ethnic category. This table excludes Latinos from the racial categories and assigns them to a separate category. Hispanics/Latinos may be of any race.
Race / Ethnicity (NH = Non-Hispanic)	Pop 1980	Pop 1990	Pop 2000	Pop 2010	Pop 2020	% 1980	% 1990	% 2000	% 2010	% 2020
White alone (NH)	27,355	25,355	25,035	23,011	21,309	96.16%	95.50%	93.65%	92.37%	89.65%
Black or African American alone (NH)	860	925	1,079	974	692	3.02%	3.48%	4.04%	3.91%	2.91%
Native American or Alaska Native alone (NH)	28	66	71	84	69	0.10%	0.25%	0.27%	0.34%	0.29%
Asian alone (NH)	32	39	52	100	122	0.11%	0.15%	0.19%	0.40%	0.51%
Native Hawaiian or Pacific Islander alone (NH)	x	x	3	9	0	x	x	0.01%	0.04%	0.00%
Other race alone (NH)	27	31	12	10	94	0.09%	0.12%	0.04%	0.04%	0.40%
Mixed race or Multiracial (NH)	x	x	223	385	1,009	x	x	0.83%	1.55%	4.25%
Hispanic or Latino (any race)	146	135	258	340	473	0.51%	0.51%	0.97%	1.36%	1.99%
Total	28,448	26,551	26,733	24,913	23,768	100.00%	100.00%	100.00%	100.00%	100.00%

=== 2010 census ===
As of the 2010 United States census, there were 24,913 people, 10,379 households, and 6,631 families residing in the county. The population density was 65.6 inhabitants per square mile (25.3/km^{2}). There were 11,697 housing units at an average density of 30.8 per square mile (11.9/km^{2}). The racial makeup of the county was 93.0% white, 4.0% black or African American, 0.4% Asian, 0.4% American Indian, 0.1% Pacific islander, 0.4% from other races, and 1.8% from two or more races. Those of Hispanic or Latino origin made up 1.4% of the population. In terms of ancestry, 17.8% were Irish, 16.6% were German, 12.9% were American, and 11.1% were English.

Of the 10,379 households, 29.0% had children under the age of 18 living with them, 47.4% were married couples living together, 11.7% had a female householder with no husband present, 36.1% were non-families, and 31.9% of all households were made up of individuals. The average household size was 2.32 and the average family size was 2.89. The median age was 41.7 years.

The median income for a household in the county was $35,644 and the median income for a family was $46,314. Males had a median income of $41,108 versus $28,464 for females. The per capita income for the county was $20,903. About 13.4% of families and 18.4% of the population were below the poverty line, including 26.5% of those under age 18 and 10.4% of those age 65 or over.

== Communities ==
=== Cities ===
- Eldorado
- Harrisburg

=== Villages ===
- Carrier Mills (Morrilsville)
- Galatia
- Muddy
- Raleigh
- Stonefort (partly in Williamson County)

=== Unincorporated communities ===
- Buena Vista
- Cottage Grove
- Derby
- Eagle
- Harco
- Lakeview (Pond Settlement)
- Ledford
- Liberty
- Long Branch
- Mitchellsville
- New Hope
- Pankeyville
- Rudement
- Somerset
- Texas City
- Wasson
- West End

=== Townships ===
Saline County is divided into thirteen townships:

- Brushy
- Carrier Mills
- Cottage
- East Eldorado
- Galatia
- Harrisburg
- Independence
- Long Branch
- Mountain
- Raleigh
- Rector
- Stone Fort
- Tate

== Politics ==
Saline County is a Republican stronghold. Unlike most of Southern Illinois, Republicans were also successful in the latter decades of the 1800s. This usurped a Democratic trend that followed the county's founding. Saline County would become a Republican-leaning swing county in the 1910s. This held on for the remainder of twentieth century and broke in the new millennium. Despite having voted for the last three Democratic presidential candidates, Saline County began electing only Republicans from 2000 onward. Since the 2010s, Democrats have not managed to reach even 35% of the vote.

The county was less conservative downballot; as recently as 2006 it voted for Illinois's Democrat gubernatorial candidate. However, as of 2022, over three quarters of its vote went to the Republican candidate.

United States presidential election results for Saline County, Illinois
Year	Republican		Democratic		Third party(ies)	
Year	No.	%	No.	%	No.	%
1892	2,171	49.90%	1,828	42.01%	352	8.09%
1896	2,605	52.81%	2,296	46.54%	32	0.65%
1900	2,495	52.46%	2,186	45.96%	75	1.58%
1904	2,735	56.93%	1,758	36.59%	311	6.47%
1908	3,125	52.12%	2,471	41.21%	400	6.67%
1912	1,468	18.10%	3,599	44.37%	3,044	37.53%
1916	7,061	50.49%	5,930	42.41%	993	7.10%
1920	6,722	52.96%	3,500	27.58%	2,470	19.46%
1924	6,084	47.03%	4,037	31.21%	2,816	21.77%
1928	7,525	53.82%	6,337	45.32%	121	0.87%
1932	6,294	38.21%	9,725	59.04%	454	2.76%
1936	9,055	46.16%	10,253	52.27%	308	1.57%
1940	10,567	49.43%	10,692	50.02%	118	0.55%
1944	9,083	54.92%	7,351	44.45%	105	0.63%
1948	7,676	49.57%	7,718	49.84%	91	0.59%
1952	9,206	54.13%	7,771	45.70%	29	0.17%
1956	8,481	53.96%	7,215	45.91%	20	0.13%
1960	8,853	56.36%	6,835	43.52%	19	0.12%
1964	5,691	40.57%	8,337	59.43%	0	0.00%
1968	6,913	49.92%	5,985	43.22%	951	6.87%
1972	7,660	59.30%	5,226	40.46%	32	0.25%
1976	5,970	44.25%	7,472	55.38%	51	0.38%
1980	7,157	53.95%	5,683	42.84%	425	3.20%
1984	7,176	54.15%	6,038	45.57%	37	0.28%
1988	5,798	46.31%	6,676	53.32%	47	0.38%
1992	3,667	27.67%	7,258	54.76%	2,329	17.57%
1996	3,693	31.66%	6,156	52.77%	1,816	15.57%
2000	5,933	50.93%	5,427	46.58%	290	2.49%
2004	7,057	59.73%	4,697	39.76%	60	0.51%
2008	6,099	53.15%	5,083	44.29%	294	2.56%
2012	6,806	63.49%	3,701	34.52%	213	1.99%
2016	8,276	72.70%	2,572	22.59%	536	4.71%
2020	8,103	73.07%	2,789	25.15%	197	1.78%
2024	7,830	73.67%	2,634	24.78%	165	1.55%

== See also ==
- National Register of Historic Places listings in Saline County
- Ku Klux Klan in Southern Illinois
