= Raleigh Township, Saline County, Illinois =

Raleigh Township
- Township

- Location of Illinois in the United States
- Coordinates: 37°49′04″N 88°32′17″W
- Country: United States
- State: Illinois
- County: Saline
- Settled: November 5, 1889

Area
  - Total: 36.79 sq mi (95.3 km^{2})
  - Land: 36.02 sq mi (93.3 km^{2})
  - Water: 0.77 sq mi (2.0 km^{2})
- Elevation: 394 ft (120 m)

Population (2010)
  - Estimate (2016): 1,160
  - Density: 32.9/sq mi (12.7/km^{2})
- Time zone: UTC-6 (CST)
  - Summer (DST): UTC-5 (CDT)
- FIPS code: 17-165-62601

Raleigh Township is located in Saline County, Illinois. As of the 2010 census, its population was 1,186 and it contained 632 housing units.

== Geography ==
According to the 2010 census, the township has a total area of 36.79 square miles (95.3 km^{2}), of which 36.02 square miles (93.3 km^{2}) (or 97.91%) is land and 0.77 square miles (2.0 km^{2}) (or 2.09%) is water.

== Demographics ==
Historical population
Census	Pop.	Note	%±
2016 (est.)	1,160
U.S. Decennial Census
