= Independence Township, Saline County, Illinois =

Independence Township
- Township

- Location of Illinois in the United States
- Coordinates: 37°38′19″N 88°32′43″W
- Country: United States
- State: Illinois
- County: Saline
- Settled: November 5, 1889

Area
  - Total: 37.37 sq mi (96.8 km^{2})
  - Land: 36.87 sq mi (95.5 km^{2})
  - Water: 0.5 sq mi (1.3 km^{2})
- Elevation: 374 ft (114 m)

Population (2010)
  - Estimate (2016): 1,088
  - Density: 30.3/sq mi (11.7/km^{2})
- Time zone: UTC-6 (CST)
  - Summer (DST): UTC-5 (CDT)
- FIPS code: 17-165-37205

Independence Township is located in Saline County, Illinois. As of the 2010 census, its population was 1,118 and it contained 478 housing units.

== Geography ==
According to the 2010 census, the township has a total area of 37.37 square miles (96.8 km^{2}), of which 36.87 square miles (95.5 km^{2}) (or 98.66%) is land and 0.5 square miles (1.3 km^{2}) (or 1.34%) is water.

== Demographics ==
Historical population
Census	Pop.	Note	%±
2016 (est.)	1,088
U.S. Decennial Census
