= Cottage Township, Saline County, Illinois =

Cottage Township
- Township

- Location of Illinois in the United States
- Coordinates: 37°44′02″N 88°25′53″W
- Country: United States
- State: Illinois
- County: Saline
- Settled: November 5, 1889

Area
  - Total: 31.06 sq mi (80.4 km^{2})
  - Land: 30.56 sq mi (79.2 km^{2})
  - Water: 0.49 sq mi (1.3 km^{2})
- Elevation: 371 ft (113 m)

Population (2010)
  - Estimate (2016): 215
  - Density: 7.2/sq mi (2.8/km^{2})
- Time zone: UTC-6 (CST)
  - Summer (DST): UTC-5 (CDT)
- FIPS code: 17-165-16535

Cottage Township is located in Saline County, Illinois. As of the 2010 census, its population was 219 and it contained 108 housing units.

== Geography ==
According to the 2010 census, the township has a total area of 31.06 square miles (80.4 km^{2}), of which 30.56 square miles (79.2 km^{2}) (or 98.39%) is land and 0.49 square miles (1.3 km^{2}) (or 1.58%) is water.

== Demographics ==
Historical population
Census	Pop.	Note	%±
2016 (est.)	215
U.S. Decennial Census
