= Harrisburg Township, Saline County, Illinois =

Township in Illinois, United States

Harrisburg Township
- Township

- Location of Illinois in the United States
- Coordinates: 37°43′54″N 88°32′28″W
- Country: United States
- State: Illinois
- County: Saline
- Settled: November 5, 1889

Area
  - Total: 37.34 sq mi (96.7 km^{2})
  - Land: 36.44 sq mi (94.4 km^{2})
  - Water: 0.9 sq mi (2.3 km^{2})
- Elevation: 358 ft (109 m)

Population (2010)
  - Estimate (2016): 10,536
  - Density: 296.1/sq mi (114.3/km^{2})
- Time zone: UTC-6 (CST)
  - Summer (DST): UTC-5 (CDT)
- FIPS code: 17-165-33149

Harrisburg Township is located in Saline County, Illinois. As of the 2010 census, its population was 10,790 and it contained 4,948 housing units.

== Geography ==
According to the 2010 census, the township has a total area of 37.34 square miles (96.7 km^{2}), of which 36.44 square miles (94.4 km^{2}) (or 97.59%) is land and 0.9 square miles (2.3 km^{2}) (or 2.41%) is water.

Historical population
Census	Pop.	Note	%±
2016 (est.)	10,536
U.S. Decennial Census
