= Tate Township, Saline County, Illinois =

Tate Township
- Township

- Location of Illinois in the United States
- Coordinates: 37°53′04″N 88°38′58″W
- Country: United States
- State: Illinois
- County: Saline
- Settled: November 5, 1889

Area
  - Total: 18.19 sq mi (47.1 km^{2})
  - Land: 18.13 sq mi (47.0 km^{2})
  - Water: 0.06 sq mi (0.16 km^{2})
- Elevation: 505 ft (154 m)

Population (2010)
  - Estimate (2016): 293
  - Density: 16.4/sq mi (6.3/km^{2})
- Time zone: UTC-6 (CST)
  - Summer (DST): UTC-5 (CDT)
- FIPS code: 17-165-74509

Tate Township is located in Saline County, Illinois. As of the 2010 census, its population was 298 and it contained 129 housing units.

== Geography ==
According to the 2010 census, the township has a total area of 18.19 square miles (47.1 km^{2}), of which 18.13 square miles (47.0 km^{2}) (or 99.67%) is land and 0.06 square miles (0.16 km^{2}) (or 0.33%) is water.

== Demographics ==
Historical population
Census	Pop.	Note	%±
2016 (est.)	293
U.S. Decennial Census
