= Mountain Township, Saline County, Illinois =

Mountain Township
- Township

- Location of Illinois in the United States
- Coordinates: 37°39′21″N 88°26′03″W
- Country: United States
- State: Illinois
- County: Saline
- Settled: November 5, 1889

Area
  - Total: 42.86 sq mi (111.0 km^{2})
  - Land: 41.87 sq mi (108.4 km^{2})
  - Water: 1 sq mi (2.6 km^{2})
- Elevation: 883 ft (269 m)

Population (2020)
  - Total: 395
  - Density: 8.5/sq mi (3.3/km^{2})
- Time zone: UTC-6 (CST)
  - Summer (DST): UTC-5 (CDT)
- FIPS code: 17-165-50803

Mountain Township is located in Saline County, Illinois. As of the 2020 census, its population was 395 and it contained 181 housing units.

== Geography ==
According to the 2010 census, the township has a total area of 42.86 square miles (111.0 km^{2}), of which 41.87 square miles (108.4 km^{2}) (or 97.69%) is land and 1 square mile (2.6 km^{2}) (or 2.33%) is water.

== Demographics ==
Historical population
Census	Pop.	Note	%±
2016 (est.)	351
U.S. Decennial Census
