= From Here to Eternity (disambiguation) =

From Here to Eternity is a 1953 film.

From Here to Eternity may also refer to:

- From Here to Eternity (novel), a 1951 novel by James Jones; basis for the 1953 film
- From Here to Eternity the Musical, a 2013 musical by Tim Rice based on the novel
- From Here to Eternity (miniseries), a 1979 TV miniseries
- From Here to Eternity (TV series), a 1980 TV series based on the novel
- "From Here to Eternity", an episode of the TV series The Best Years
- "From Here to Eternity", an episode of the anime television series RahXephon
- From Here to Eternity: Traveling the World to Find the Good Death, a 2017 book by Caitlin Doughty

== Music ==
- From Here to Eternity (Giorgio Moroder album), 1977
- "From Here to Eternity" (Giorgio Moroder song), 1977
- From Here to Eternity: Live, a 1999 album by the Clash
- From Here to Eternity (Envy album), 1998
- "From Here to Eternity" (Iron Maiden song), 1992
- "From Here to Eternity" (Michael Peterson song), 1997
- "From Here to Eternity", a 1953 song recorded by Frank Sinatra

== See also ==
- From Here to Eternally, a 1979 Spinners album
- From Her to Eternity, a 1984 album by Nick Cave & the Bad Seeds
- From There to Eternity or The First Ten Years: The Videos, a DVD by Iron Maiden
- "From Where to Eternity", episode 22 of The Sopranos
- From Fear to Eternity (disambiguation)
