= Some Came Running =

Some Came Running may refer to:

- Some Came Running (novel), a 1958 novel by James Jones
- Some Came Running (film), a 1958 American drama film, based on the novel
