= From Here to Eternity (musical) =

Musical by Stuart Brayson and Tim Rice

- West End production poster
- Music: Stuart Brayson
- Lyrics: Tim Rice
- Book: Bill Oakes
- Basis: From Here to Eternity by James Jones
- Premiere: 23 October 2013: Shaftesbury Theatre
- Productions: 2013 West End; 2016 New York; 2022 Off West End Revival

From Here to Eternity is a musical with music and lyrics by Stuart Brayson and Tim Rice and a book by Bill Oakes. Based on the 1951 novel of the same name by James Jones, the musical made its West End and world premiere in 2013, at the Shaftesbury Theatre, London.

Jones's novel From Here to Eternity was a best-seller and well known for its successful movie adaptation. Jones's manuscript was heavily censored by his publisher to remove profanity and references to gay prostitution; the unexpurgated version was not published until 2011. Once it was, the composer Stuart Brayson thought it might be adapted as a musical, and proposed the project to Tim Rice, who acquired the stage rights and wrote the lyrics.

The musical was announced in May 2011 and opened on 23 October 2013, a year later than originally planned. The West End production stars Darius Campbell as Warden, Robert Lonsdale as Private Prewitt, and Ryan Sampson as Maggio. The work received mixed reviews, though Brayson was praised for an imaginative score. The production closed on 29 March 2014, after a run of six and a half months. It later transferred to the United States, in 2016.

== Synopsis ==
The musical is set in 1941, at the Schofield Barracks in Hawaii, in the months leading up to the Attack on Pearl Harbor. The story tells the tale of G Company, in particular First Sergeant Milt Warden, who begins an affair with his captain's wife Karen, insubordinate soldier and male hustler Maggio and Private Robert E. Lee Prewitt, an infantryman from Kentucky and self-described "thirty-year man" (a career soldier), who falls in love with prostitute Lorene. Because he blinded a fellow soldier while boxing, the stubborn Prewitt refuses to box for his company's outfit led by Captain Dana "Dynamite" Holmes and then resists the "Treatment," a daily hazing ritual in which the non-commissioned officers of his company run him into the ground.

== Background ==
From Here to Eternity's author James Jones

The basis of the musical is the 1951 novel From Here to Eternity by James Jones. In 1941, Jones was serving with the US Army in Hawaii, at the time of Pearl Harbor, and the novel was loosely based on his experiences in the 27th Infantry Regiment. It focuses on the lives of a group of soldiers in the months leading up to the attack, in particular Private Prewitt, a boxer who no longer wants to fight having blinded an opponent, and Sergeant Milt Warden, who has an affair with the wife of his commanding officer.

James's story was censored by its publisher, Scribner as it would not allow profanity and gay prostitution. to remain in the text. Jones fought the censorship but had to back down; despite this it won the National Book Award for Fiction in 1952 and is recognised as one of the twentieth century's best American novels. The title of From Here to Eternity is inspired by Rudyard Kipling's poem "Gentlemen-Rankers", in particular the line "damned from here to Eternity". Two years later in 1953, it was adapted into a film starring Montgomery Clift, Burt Lancaster, Deborah Kerr, Frank Sinatra, Donna Reed and Ernest Borgnine which achieved success at the box office and won eight Academy Awards, including Best Picture. The movie was also initially deemed controversial because of the source text's critical views on the Army, with minor changes being made to the script to gain the military's co-operation. The uncensored version of the novel was released in May 2011, initially as an e-book.

The idea for the musical came from Stuart Brayson, who had been sending cassette tapes with music ideas to Tim Rice since they had first met in the 1980s, when Brayson was a member of the band Pop. In 2002, Brayson sent Rice a tape of music and lyrics to form the basis of a stage version of From Here to Eternity. Rice liked the idea but only intended to produce the show, however after Bill Oakes had been hired to write the book gaps appeared where new songs were needed and some no longer fitted within the context of the show. Rice agreed to write around six new songs, but ultimately ended up writing around 90% of the show's lyrics inspired by Brayson's original lyrics. On the subject Rice said: "Stuart's were very good, but they weren't theatrical and there is a difference. I often wish I could write great rock lyrics, but I can't, however, I can do reasonable lyrics within the context of a show. There are people who can write good tunes, but few who can do theatrical lyrics."

In May 2011, Tim Rice and Lee Menzie announced that an adaptation was being planned. Rice acquired the stage rights at an initial cost of around US$40,000, with the intention of opening the show in London the following year. Although the show did not ultimately open until 2013, a workshop of the show took place in 2012.

As the show is based on the uncensored novel released in 2011, rather than the 1953 film adaptation, it contains references to prostitution and gay sex, as well as the Army's investigation into them, that the film did not feature. The right to create the musical adaptation came with the condition that it had to be based on the original book. James Jones's daughter Kaylie and son Jamie were in the audience for the show's opening night in London. During its preview period some people walked out of the performance, having been unprepared for the nudity and swearing in the production. Darius Campbell who played First Sergeant Milt Warden, said that the "James Jones novel really portrayed homosexuality and prostitution in the way that it existed in those days and we've dived in head first. Maybe some of the nudity, swearing and explicitness have been too much for them, but a younger audience and an audience who have loved the film – and wanted to see more – have been giving us standing ovations and for that we are all grateful." Kaylie admitted they had doubts about the idea of the show when it first came up, but added that "I'm thrilled—it's so sophisticated and moving." She also noted that she "was so delighted they put in the gay bar scenes, because my dad said this is just the way it was back then" and that "my father would have been amazed".

=== Themes ===
The show contains many adult themes, including, gay men in the United States military, prostitution, bullying and the effects of war. As a result of these themes, the show is recommended for children aged 13 onwards.

== Production history ==
=== West End (2013) ===
Male ensemble cast of From Here to Eternity

On 26 October 2012, producers announced that the show would play the Shaftesbury Theatre from September 2013, with tickets going on sale in April. The show has a book by Bill Oakes and is directed by Tamara Harvey, with choreography by Javier de Frutos, orchestrations by David White, set and costume design by Soutra Gilmour, lighting design by Bruno Poet and sound design by Mick Potter. The musical features an original score, with music by Stuart Brayson and lyrics by Tim Rice. The musical adaptation marked Rice's first entirely new show since Aida and Brayson's first West End musical. Former US Marine Ray Elliott, also head of the James Jones literary society, was hired to ensure an accurate picture of military life for the era. Elliott read the script to ensure it was realistic, ran military drills, taught the cast how to salute all ranks and how to hold rifles correctly. The show received its first public outing as part of West End Live in June 2013, with star Robert Lonsdale singing "Fight the Fight".

On 1 July 2013, full casting was announced with Darius Campbell playing Warden, Robert Lonsdale playing Private Prewitt, Ryan Sampson playing Maggio, Siubhan Harrison playing Lorene and Rebecca Thornhill playing Karen. From Here to Eternity began previews on 30 September 2013, at the Shaftesbury Theatre, London, and held its official opening gala night on 23 October. In all the London production features a cast of thirty three and a fifteen-member band. A typical London performance ran two hours and 50 minutes, including one interval of 15 mins.

On 29 November 2013, it was announced the production would close on 26 April 2014, after a 7 1/2-month run, with the possibility of reopening at another theatre. The closure was later brought forward a month to 29 March. To mark the 72nd anniversary of Pearl Harbor on 7 December 2013, the cast joined with The Military Wives choir for a special post curtain rendition of the song "The Boys of '41".

=== US Premiere (2016) ===
June 29, 2016 saw the production's US premiere at the Finger Lakes Musical Theatre Festival in New York starring Corey Mach and Paige Fauré.

=== Off-West End Revival (2022) ===
A newly revised production played the Charing Cross Theatre from 29 October 2022 to 17 December 2022. The production was directed by Brett Smock, with orchestrations and new musical arrangements by Nick J Barstow, set and costume design by Stewart J. Charlesworth, choreography by Cressida Carré, lighting design by Adam King, projection design by Louise Rhodes-Brown, and casting by Jane Deitch. This production was significantly different from the original West End one, with a completely rewritten book and lots of changes made to the musical numbers, since the female ensemble was cut and the cast size reduced.

== Music ==
Brayson's music features a mix of blues, swing, big band, and rock 'n' roll numbers. The musical uses a fifteen-member orchestra consisting of keyboard, cello, ukulele, flute, saxophone, clarinet, flugelhorn, trumpet, bugle, trombone, tuba, French horn, guitar, bass, drums, percussion and harmonica. On the show's music Alexander Gilmour, writing for Financial Times said that the show: "has half a dozen numbers that bring the house down", and that "it feels grown-up. It has a certain grit. It's moving. You might just cry, fall in love, hum yourself to sleep to the tune of 'Thirty Year Man', wake up and join the army."

=== Musical numbers (2013 West End production) ===
Act I

- "Prologue" – Maggio
- "G Company Blues" – The Men of G Company
- "Thirty Year Man" – Prewitt, The Men of G Company
- "Another Language" – Karen
- "Sure" – Warden
- "Don'cha Like Hawaii" – Mrs. Kipfer, The New Congress Club Trio, Company
- "You Got the Money" – Lorene, The Girls of the New Congress Club
- "The Treatment" – Prewitt
- "Marking Time" – Warden
- "Fight the Fight" – Prewitt, The Men of G Company
- "Run Along Joe" – Lorene
- "You Got the Money" (reprise) – Drag Queen
- "Fight the Fight" (reprise) – Prewitt
- "More Than America" – Warden, Karen, Company

Act II

- "Thirty Year Man" (reprise) – The Men of G Company
- "Love Me Forever Today" – Prewitt, Lorene
- "I Love the Army" – Maggio
- "Ain't Where I Wanna Be Blues" – Prewitt, Warden
- "G Company Blues" (boxing reprise) – The Men of G Company
- "Maybe" – Karen
- "Something in Return" – Warden, Prewitt, Karen, Lorene, Maggio, Company
- "Fight the Fight" (reprise) – Prewitt
- "From Here to Eternity" – Karen, Warden, Lorene, Prewitt
- "The Boys of '41"– The Ladies
- "Run Along Joe" (reprise)– Lorene
- "Almost Perfect Lie" – Prewitt
- "Finale"– Company

=== Musical numbers (2022 Off-West End revival) ===
Act I

- "G Company Blues" – The Men of G Company
- "Thirty Year Man" – Prewitt, The Men of G Company
- "More to Life Than This" – Karen
- "I Know What You Came For" – Mrs. Kipfer
- "From Here to Eternity" – The Men of G Company
- "At Ease" – Warden
- "Love Me Forever Today" – Prewitt, Lorene
- "Thirty Year Man" (reprise) — Warden, The Men of G Company

Act II

- "Ain't Where I Wanna Be Blues" – Prewitt, Warden
- "I Love the Army" – Maggio
- "Fight the Fight" – Prewitt
- "Run Along Joe" – Lorene
- "I Love the Army" (reprise) – Maggio
- "I'll Remember the Day" – Karen
- "The Boys of '41" – Karen, Lorene, Mrs. Kipfer
- "Run Along Joe" (reprise) – Lorene
- "Almost Perfect Lie" – Prewitt
- "Finale" – Company

=== Recordings ===
From Here to Eternity the Musical Live Cast Recording

Soundtrack album cast recording by Various
- Released: 3 July 2014
- Length: 1:03:59

The song "Fight the Fight" from the show was recorded and released by Michael Ball as part of his Both Sides Now album in February 2013. The same track was later released as a digital download in December 2013, sung by Robert Lonsdale. In July 2013, Rice allowed Clare Teal to record another song from the show, "Another Language", for release on her album And So It Goes. In February 2014, Rice announced that a cast album would be recorded, prior to the show's West End closure. The original London cast recording was released as a digital download on 3 July 2014, with the physical release following on 4 August.

==== Cast album ====
No.	Title	Length
1.	"Overture"	2:19
2.	"G Company Blues"	3:36
3.	"Thirty Year Man"	3:03
4.	"Another Language"	3:05
5.	"Don'cha Like Hawaii"	3:28
6.	"You Got the Money"	2:53
7.	"Marking Time"	2:44
8.	"Fight the Fight"	2:42
9.	"Run Along Joe"	3:28
10.	"More Than America"	4:00
11.	"Thirty Year Man (reprise)"	3:51
12.	"Love Me Forever Today"	3:33
13.	"I Love the Army"	4:52
14.	"Ain't Where I Wanna Be Blues"	2:45
15.	"Maybe"	3:58
16.	"Something in Return"	3:34
17.	"The Boys of '41"	2:56
18.	"Almost Perfect Lie"	2:58
19.	"Finale – G Company Blues/ The Boys of '41"	4:14

== Principal roles and cast members ==
Character	Original West End Cast (2013)	Off-West End Revival (2022)
Private Robert E. Lee Prewitt	Robert Lonsdale	Jonathon Bentley
First Sergeant Milt Warden	Darius Campbell	Adam Rhys-Charles
Karen Holmes	Rebecca Thornhill	Carley Stenson
Lorene	Siubhan Harrison	Desmonda Cathabel
Private Angelo Maggio	Ryan Sampson	Jonny Amies
Captain Dana Holmes	Martin Marquez	Alan Turkington
Sergeant Ike Galovitch	David Stoller	Rhys Nuttall
Sergeant "Fatso" Judson	Brian Doherty	Leonard Cook
Private Clark	Marc Antolin	Callum Henderson
Private Anderson	Warren Sollars	James Mateo-Salt
Private Isaac Bloom	Joshua Lacey	Jack Ofrecio
Mrs. Kipfer	Julie Armstong	Eve Polycarpou

== Critical reception ==
Michael Billington of The Guardian noted that the original novel had helped offset overly heroic images of the American soldier, but in the wake of Abu Ghraib, the view of the military was already mixed, "why now, and what does music add to the story?" Simon Edge of the Daily Express deemed the show "a commendably ambitious work that makes a refreshing addition to the West End menu." Paul Taylor of The Independent suggested, "For all the show's many defects, though, you come away impressed by its seriousness of purpose".

Taylor praised the music: "Brayson's catchy score, which moves deftly through swing, blues, jazz and early rock'n'roll can rise to good old showbiz brassiness when needed". Henry Hitchings of the Evening Standard gave a mixed view of the music, "There are seductive melodies and a couple of genuinely catchy songs. But it never settles into a single confident idiom, and between the big numbers there are lulls, especially in the overlong first half."

Taylor predicted on 24 October 2013, "Wags have quipped that it should be called From Here to November. But I reckon it's going to survive quite a bit longer than that."

== Awards and nominations ==
On 6 December 2013, it was announced the production had received four WhatsOnStage Awards nominations, including Best New Musical. Ultimately the production did not win in any of the four categories. Although eligible, the musical did not receive any nominations for the 2014 Laurence Olivier Awards.

Year	Award	Category	Nominee	Result	Ref
2014	WhatsOnStage Awards	Best New Musical		Nominated	
2014	WhatsOnStage Awards	Best Actor	Robert Lonsdale	Nominated	
2014	WhatsOnStage Awards	Best Supporting Actor	Ryan Sampson	Nominated	
2014	WhatsOnStage Awards	Best Choreographer	Javier de Frutos	Nominated	
