= A Soldier's Daughter Never Cries =

A Soldier's Daughter Never Cries may refer to:

- A Soldier's Daughter Never Cries (novel), a 1990 semi-autobiographical novel by Kaylie Jones, daughter of the author James Jones
- A Soldier's Daughter Never Cries (film), a 1998 French/U.S. adaptation of the novel
