= Some Came Running (film) =

1958 film by Vincente Minnelli

- Theatrical release poster
- Directed by: Vincente Minnelli
- Written by: John Patrick; Arthur Sheekman
- Based on: Some Came Running; 1958 novel by James Jones
- Produced by: Sol C. Siegel
- Starring: Frank Sinatra; Dean Martin; Shirley MacLaine; Martha Hyer; Arthur Kennedy; Nancy Gates; Leora Dana
- Cinematography: William H. Daniels
- Edited by: Adrienne Fazan
- Music by: Elmer Bernstein
- Distributed by: Metro-Goldwyn-Mayer
- Release dates: December 18, 1958; January 22, 1959 (New York)
- Running time: 136 minutes
- Country: United States
- Language: English
- Budget: $3 million
- Box office: $6 million

Some Came Running is a 1958 American drama film directed by Vincente Minnelli and starring Frank Sinatra, Dean Martin and Shirley MacLaine, based on the 1958 novel of the same name by James Jones. Set in 1948, it tells the story of a troubled army veteran and author who returns to his Midwestern home town after 16 years, to the chagrin of his wealthy, social-climbing brother.

Metro-Goldwyn-Mayer, in a bid to duplicate the success of the Academy Award-winning film adaptation of Jones' earlier novel From Here to Eternity (1953), optioned the 1,200-plus-page book Some Came Running and cast Sinatra as the lead. Sinatra approved Dean Martin for the role of Bama in what would be their first film together. Martha Hyer garnered her only Oscar nomination, while Arthur Kennedy earned his fifth and final nomination, and MacLaine received her first of five. The film was released in CinemaScope and Metrocolor.

== Plot ==
In 1948, Dave Hirsh is a cynical Army veteran who winds up in his hometown of Parkman, Indiana, after being put on a bus in Chicago while intoxicated. Ginny Moorehead, a woman of seemingly loose morals and poor education, was invited by Dave in his drunken state to accompany him to Parkman. When Dave sobers up, he realizes it was a mistake and gives her money to return to Chicago. However, she decides to stay because she has fallen in love with Dave and is also trying to avoid a violent boyfriend in Chicago.

Dave left 16 years before and had a career as a writer before the war, publishing two books. He did not stay in touch with his older brother, Frank, because of how Frank and his wife Agnes treated him when he was a child. Frank, who was newly married to the well-off Agnes, had placed Dave in a charity boarding school rather than take him to live in his home. Frank has since inherited a jewelry business from Agnes' father, sits on the board of a local bank, and is active in civic affairs. Frank and Agnes are very concerned about their social status and reputation in the town, which is threatened when Dave returns without letting them know and then deposits $5,500 (roughly $76,000 in 2026) in the bank that competes with Frank's bank. Frank attempts to make amends with Dave in order to get him to move the bank deposit. Agnes wants nothing to do with Dave, but is forced to welcome him after two of her wealthy social acquaintances, Professor French and his daughter Gwen, a schoolteacher who teaches creative writing, ask to meet Dave because they admire his books.

When Dave meets Gwen, he immediately falls in love with her. She is attracted to him as well, but is afraid of the passionate feelings he arouses in her and of his lifestyle. Each time Gwen rejects him, he ends up back with Ginny, even though her lack of intelligence frustrates him and she is nothing like Gwen. Dave has also befriended a hard-partying but good-hearted gambler, Bama Dillert, and the two get into trouble when Ginny's ex-boyfriend, a gangster named Ray, comes to town stalking her.

Dave proposes to Gwen and she tries to reject him, but her passion is stirred as she falls into his arms.

Frank is upset because Dave's lifestyle reflects badly on him. However, Dave is shown to be a good man despite his notorious reputation when he treats Ginny with kindness and takes a fatherly interest in his niece, Frank's daughter Dawn, who becomes upset and tries to run away when she sees her father in a romantic rendezvous with his secretary, Edith.

With Gwen's encouragement and help in editing, Dave gets a new story published in The Atlantic magazine. Gwen confesses her love to Dave by telephone while he is on a gambling trip with Bama and Ginny. Gwen's phone call leads the gamblers to think Dave is cheating at cards, triggering a fight in which Bama is stabbed. During his hospital stay, Bama is informed he has diabetes, but chooses to disregard medical advice, especially about his incessant drinking.

Ginny visits Gwen at her school to ask if Gwen and Dave are in a relationship and confess her own love for Dave. Gwen is horrified to discover Dave has been seeing Ginny, assures Ginny that there is nothing between her and Dave, and then cuts Dave off. Dave, at the end of his rope from Gwen's rejection, decides to marry Ginny, even over Bama's objections. While she is not Dave's social or intellectual match, Dave recognizes that she gives him unconditional love that he's never had from anyone else. The two marry that night, but soon after they leave the judge's house, while walking among the crowds of the town's fair, Ray comes after them with a gun, shoots and injures Dave who falls to the ground, and then fatally shoots Ginny as she leaps upon Dave's fallen body to protect him from Ray's bullets. Dave places Ginny's lifeless head on the pillow she treasured as his first gift to her.

At Ginny's funeral, Professor French and a tearful Gwen, distraught at her role in the tragedy, attend the solemn occasion. Ashamed of his callous treatment of Ginny, a sorrowful Bama removes his hat, which he has never previously done, in a token of respect for her tragic heroism.

== Cast ==
- Frank Sinatra as Dave Hirsh
- Dean Martin as Bama Dillert
- Shirley MacLaine as Ginny Moorehead
- Martha Hyer as Gwen French
- Arthur Kennedy as Frank Hirsh
- Nancy Gates as Edith Barclay
- Leora Dana as Agnes Hirsh
- Betty Lou Keim as Dawn Hirsh
- Larry Gates as Professor Robert Haven French
- Steven Peck as Raymond Lanchak (Ray)
- Connie Gilchrist as Jane Barclay
- Ned Wever as Smitty

== Production ==
MGM purchased the screen rights for James Jones' novel in early 1957, prior to its publication, in what was described as "an enormous deal". The original asking price was $1 million although the final figure was believed to have been lower, but significantly more than the $82,500 that Columbia Pictures had paid Jones for the screen rights to From Here to Eternity.

Much of the film was shot in and around the town of Madison, Indiana. Shirley MacLaine reported that Frank Sinatra was "besieged" by the local Indiana women, and that at one point a woman broke through a rope barrier around a house and flung herself at Sinatra as her husband ran to stop her, pleading "Helen, you don't even know the man!".

== Reception ==
=== Critical reaction ===
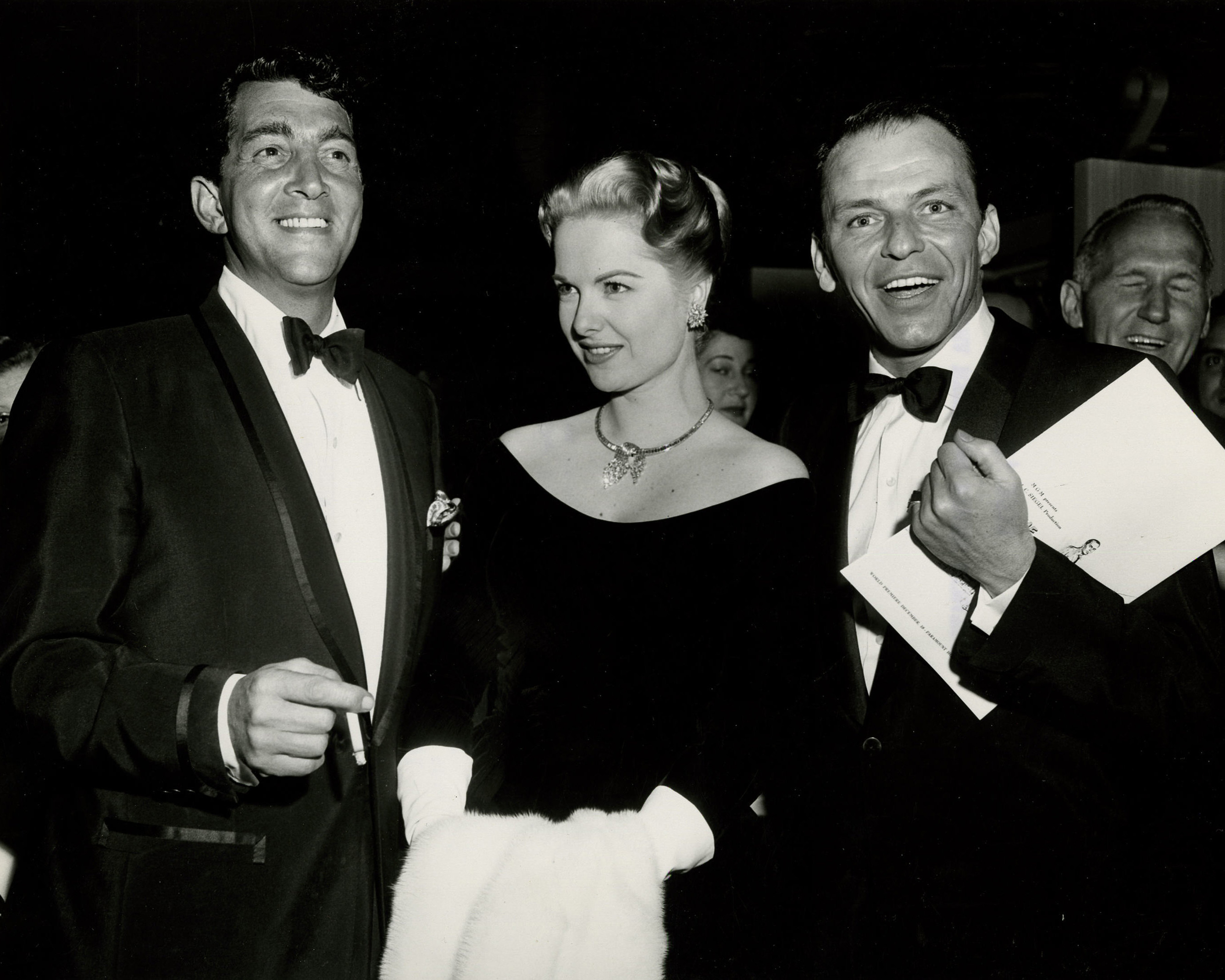
Dean Martin, Martha Hyer, and Frank Sinatra at the world premiere of Some Came Running

Bosley Crowther of The New York Times wrote:

James Jones appeared to have some trouble clarifying the perversities of people in love in this novel, "Some Came Running," published a year ago. He fully examined the works of his people, at great length and sometimes skillfully, making them very graphic, but he couldn't seem to find what made them tick. That is precisely the experience that Sol C. Siegel, producer, and his associates at Metro-Goldwyn-Mayer seemed to have had in putting together the film version … Indeed, it is so oddly garbled that John Patrick and Arthur Sheekman, who did the script, have to go for a melodramatic shooting to bring it all to a tolerable end. And Vincente Minnelli, the director, who has kept it flowing naturally to this point, has to hokek it up with grotesque action and phantasmagoric stuff with colored lights. This isn't consistent with the foregoing excellence of design in color and CinemaScope, but it is not surprising in the mixed-up pattern.

Variety wrote: "It is Sol C. Siegel's first personal production since his takeover at Metro. It has been brilliantly directed by Vincente Minnelli, with fine performances by Frank Sinatra and Dean Martin and a shattering one by Shirley MacLaine that could only have been surmised from her previous work." Harrison's Reports praised the performances of the cast and felt the story "offers a number of strong dramatic situations, good comedy relief here and there, and plentiful sex for those who like spice in their entertainment." Philip K. Scheuer of the Los Angeles Times summarized: "It is a well-acted, absorbing and explicitly adult evocation of mostly unpleasant people, faithful in its fashion to a novel considered something less than its author's From Here to Eternity."

Stanley Kauffmann of The New Republic wrote: "The film of James Jones' elephantine novel Some Came Running takes over two and a half hours and is not worth it". Time magazine praised the first half but felt afterwards "there is nothing to hang around for except for occasional flickers of brilliant overacting by Shirley MacLaine, the chance to watch Frank Sinatra play Frank Sinatra, and the spectacle of Director Vincente Minnelli's talents dissolving in the general mess of the story, like sunlight in a slag heap."

=== Box office ===
The film was popular with the public. According to MGM records, it earned $4,245,000 in the U.S. and Canada and $2,050,000 elsewhere, becoming the 10th highest-earning film of 1958. However, its high production cost meant that MGM suffered a loss of $207,000.

=== Awards and nominations ===
Award	Category	Nominee(s)	Result
Academy Awards	Best Actress	Shirley MacLaine	Nominated
Academy Awards	Best Supporting Actor	Arthur Kennedy	Nominated
Academy Awards	Best Supporting Actress	Martha Hyer	Nominated
Academy Awards	Best Costume Design	Walter Plunkett	Nominated
Academy Awards	Best Song	"To Love and Be Loved"; Music by Jimmy Van Heusen; Lyrics by Sammy Cahn	Nominated
Golden Globe Awards	Best Actress in a Motion Picture – Drama	Shirley MacLaine	Nominated
Laurel Awards	Top Drama		Nominated
Laurel Awards	Top Male Dramatic Performance	Frank Sinatra	Won
Laurel Awards	Top Female Dramatic Performance	Shirley MacLaine	Nominated
Laurel Awards	Top Male Supporting Performance	Arthur Kennedy	Nominated
Laurel Awards	Top Female Supporting Performance	Martha Hyer	Won
Laurel Awards	Top Score	Elmer Bernstein	Won
Laurel Awards	Best Song	"To Love and Be Loved"; Music by Jimmy Van Heusen; Lyrics by Sammy Cahn	Nominated

== Legacy ==
Martin Scorsese included a clip from the film for his A Personal Journey with Martin Scorsese Through American Movies. Scorsese believes that the film's final carnival scene is among the greatest and most expressive uses of CinemaScope.

Director Richard Linklater cited Some Came Running as one of his one of his favorite films.

In his book Who the Hell's in It, director Peter Bogdanovich wrote extensively about Some Came Running. He later filmed a short segment for Turner Classic Movies on the film's influence on cinema.

In the 1997 film Flubber, the robot Weebo uses a clip from the film to explain why she will no longer sabotage the professor's relationship.

== Home media ==
Some Came Running was released by Warner Home Video on May 13, 2008, as a Region 1 widescreen DVD and as part of the five-disc box set Frank Sinatra: The Golden Years, with Some Came Running as the fourth disc.
