= Kaylie Jones =

American novelist (born 1960)

- Born: August 5, 1960 (age 66); Paris, France
- Education: Wesleyan University; Columbia University School of the Arts
- Occupation: Writer
- Spouse: Kevin Heisler (1995-2017)
- Writing career
- Notable works: A Soldier's Daughter Never Cries; Lies My Mother Never Told Me

Kaylie Jones (born August 5, 1960 in Paris, France) is an American writer, memoirist and novelist.

== Biography ==
Jones is the daughter of National Book Award-winning novelist James Jones (From Here to Eternity), and Gloria Jones, a former actress and stand-in for Marilyn Monroe. Kaylie Jones grew up in Paris, France, and Sagaponack, New York. She is a graduate of Wesleyan University and Columbia University School of the Arts.

She has taught in the public schools of New York City through Teachers & Writers Collaborative, and has organized a symposium at Southampton College in memory of her father, who died in 1977.

In 1998, Jones' book A Soldier's Daughter Never Cries (published in 1990) became a Merchant Ivory film. The film was directed by James Ivory and starred Leelee Sobieski as Channe (the protagonist in the novel).

Lies My Mother Never Told Me (2009), a memoir, describes her life as the child of a celebrated author and a beautiful, competitive and witty mother, who became an editor at Doubleday with her friend, Jacqueline Kennedy Onassis. Kaylie Jones's relationship with her mother became more combative after her father's death in 1977.

In 2011, Jones was instrumental in publishing an uncensored edition of her father's From Here to Eternity. Her essay, "Judite", appears in the anthology Knitting Yarns: Writers on Knitting (2013), published by W. W. Norton & Company.

Jones helped found the MFA Program in Writing at Long Island University, which is now a part of the Stony Brook University Southampton Campus, and the MFA Program in Writing at Wilkes University. She teaches memoir, literature and fiction writing at both universities.

== Personal life ==
Jones was married to Kevin Heisler in August of 1995. They had one daughter, Eyrna Jones-Heisler, born in 1997.

Her late husband Kevin, Eyrna's father, died by suicide after years of struggle with depression.

== Works ==
- As Soon as It Rains (Doubleday, 1986)
- Quite the Other Way (Doubleday, 1989)
- A Soldier's Daughter Never Cries (Bantam Books, 1990)
- Celeste Ascending (HarperCollins, 2000)
- Speak Now (Akashic, 2003)
- Lies My Mother Never Told Me (HarperCollins/William Morrow, 2009)
- The Anger Meridian (Akashic, 2015)
- Long Island Noir (Editor) (Akashic, 2019)
