= The Merry Month of May (novel) =

First edition (publ. Delacorte)

The Merry Month of May is author James Jones's 1971 novel concerning the events of the 1968 student revolutions in Paris. It is centered on a rich American family, the Gallaghers, living as expatriates in Paris.

The Merry Month of May is only superficially concerned with the student revolution. The real subject of the novel is the sexual maladjustment of Americans. While the novel is as concerned with the sexual revolution which destroys screenwriter Harry Gallagher and his family as it is with the student revolution, the relationship between the two is not defined.

Reviews of the book were typically uneven, though never in Jones's career would the gulf between the most favorable and the least favorable reviews be so wide. At one pole were reviewers who claimed Merry Month was Jones's best novel since From Here to Eternity, while at the other pole were reviewers who claimed that Merry Month was such a bad novel that it should never have been published.
