= 1953 New York Film Critics Circle Awards =

19th New York Film Critics Circle Awards

19th New York Film Critics Circle Awards

January 23, 1954
(announced December 28, 1953)

From Here to Eternity

The 19th New York Film Critics Circle Awards, honored the best filmmaking of 1953.

== Winners ==
- Best Film:
  - From Here to Eternity
- Best Actor:
  - Burt Lancaster - From Here to Eternity
- Best Actress:
  - Audrey Hepburn - Roman Holiday
- Best Director:
  - Fred Zinnemann - From Here to Eternity
- Best Foreign Language Film:
  - Justice Is Done (Justice est faite) • France
