= Schofield Barracks =

US Army installation on Oʻahu, Hawaiʻi, US

- eponyms: LTG John Schofield
- Oahu, Hawaii, USA
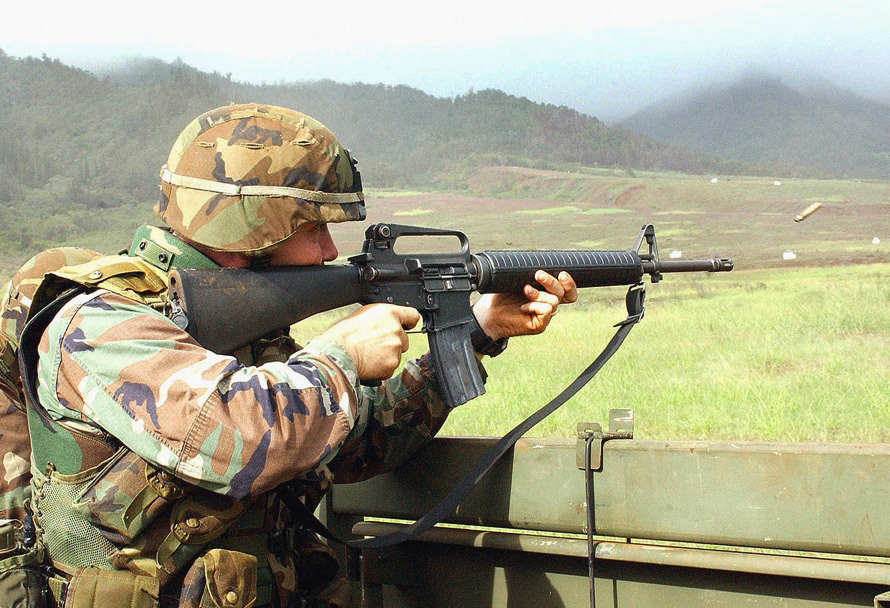
- A U.S. soldier fires an M16A2 rifle at Schofield Barracks in December 2003

Site information
- Type: Army post
- Controlled by: United States Army

Location
- Location within Hawaii Location within Oceania
- Coordinates: 21°29′52″N 158°3′48″W

Site history
- Built: 1908; 118 years ago
- In use: 1908–Present

Garrison information
- Garrison: 25th Infantry Division

Schofield Barracks is a United States Army installation and census-designated place (CDP) located in Honolulu and in the Wahiawa District of the Hawaiian island of Oʻahu, Hawaiʻi. Schofield Barracks lies adjacent to the town of Wahiawā, separated from most of it by Lake Wilson (also known as Wahiawā Reservoir). Schofield Barracks is named after Lieutenant General John McAllister Schofield, who was the Commanding General of the United States Army from August 1888 to September 1895. He had been sent to Hawaiʻi in 1872 and had recommended the establishment of a naval base at Pearl Harbor.

Schofield Barracks has an area of 17,725 acres (72 km^{2}) on Central Oʻahu. The post was established in 1908 to provide mobile defense of Pearl Harbor and the entire island. It has been the home of the 25th Infantry Division, nicknamed the "Tropic Lightning" division, since 1941, as well as the headquarters for United States Army Hawaii (USARHAW).

Schofield is home to the Pacific field office of the Army CID.

The population was 14,904 at the 2020 census.

== Geography ==
Schofield Barracks is located at 21°29′52″N 158°3′48″W (21.497650, −158.063248). The Main Gate used to be off Wilikina Drive; however, now only the Foote and Lyman gates located along Kunia Road are used for controlled access. Proceeding north on Wilikina Road (State Rte. 99) leads to intersections with Kaukonahua Road (State Rte. 801) to Waialua and Kamehameha Highway (State Rte. 99) to Haleʻiwa. East on Wilikina leads to Interstate H-2 and Kamehameha Highway (State Rte.s 80 and 99) to Wahiawā and Mililani Town. Proceeding south on Kunia Road (State Route 750) past Schofield leads to the Kunia Gate on Wheeler, Kunia, and eventually Waipahu.

According to the United States Census Bureau, the post has a total area of 2.8 square miles (7.3 km^{2}), all of it land.

== Post areas ==
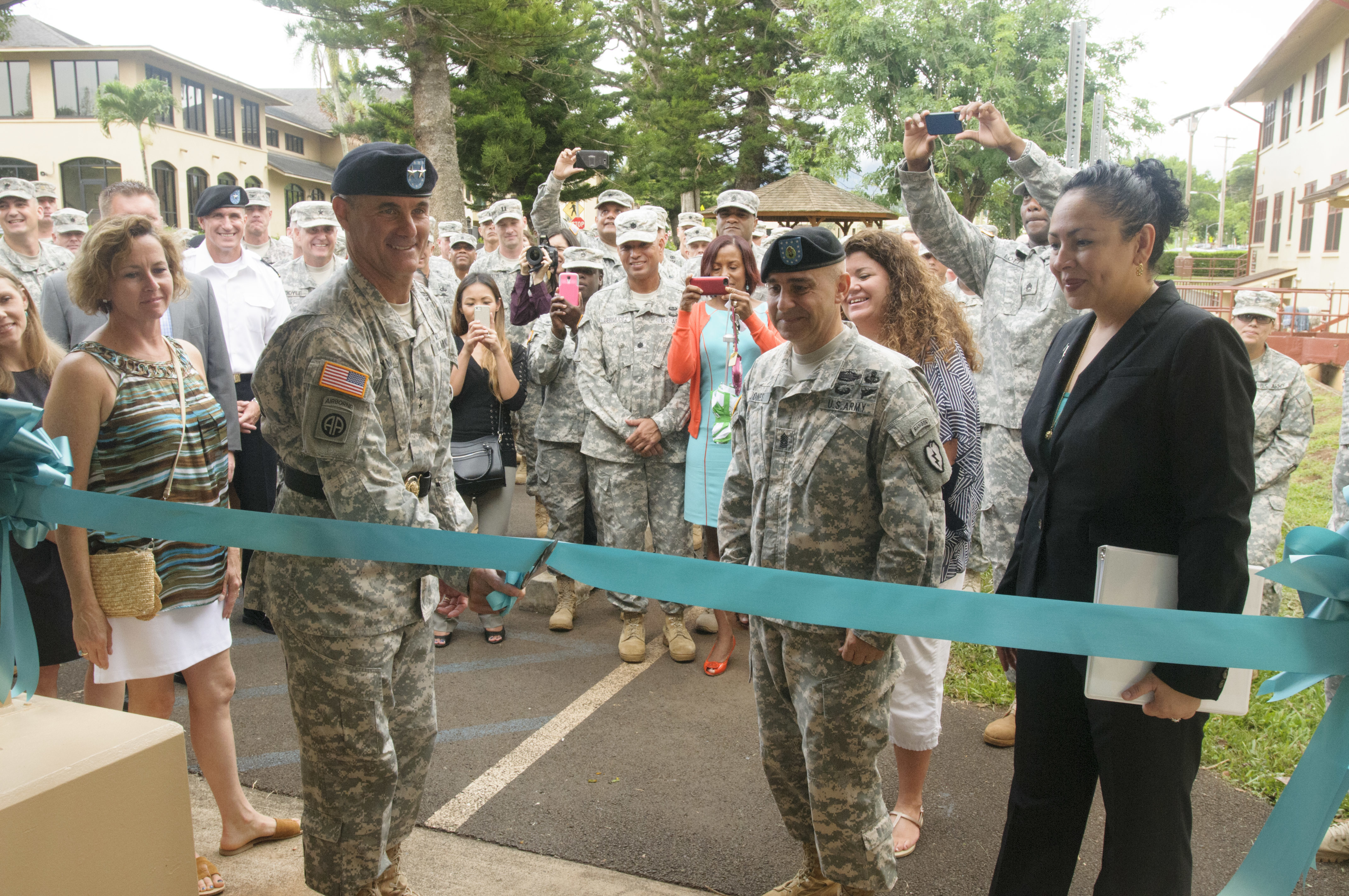
Major General Charles A. Flynn cuts the ceremonial ribbon during the opening of the SHARP Resource Center on Schofield Barracks, October 17, 2014.

=== Main Post ===
The Main Post area consists of numerous quadrangle-style barracks and unit command structures, most of which have a letter designation. B and C Quads are the oldest, having been constructed in the 1910s, with D, E, and F quads being built later. Additionally on Main Post are the PX (post exchange), the Commissary, the "Aloha Building", the Library, Bowling Alley, and Uniform Clothing Store. Several sets of barracks have recently been constructed (the first set completed in 1998) adhering to a more stylish apartment-type setup. The Nehelani Club, Old Nehelani Club and Conroy Bowl are in the Main Post area as well.

=== Housing areas ===
Much of the housing on-post has been renovated or rebuilt now that the housing has been privatized. The enlisted housing area lies to the west of Main Post, while the officers' housing lies to the north along Wilikina Drive. Island Palms is the on-post housing company, which is part of Lend Lease, that is responsible for maintaining the units. The average wait time for housing is 2–6 months and up to one year for larger homes.

=== Area X ===
Area X and its environs constitute the bulk of the training areas on Schofield Barracks. Large open areas allow for air assault operations to take off and land. Covered concrete pads can provide shelter for units training in the area who do not wish to deal with sleeping in the field. The range control office as well as numerous semi-automated and other firing ranges are contained within this area as well.

=== East Range Training Area ===
The Air Assault School, Land Navigation Course, and designated training areas are laid out in this area to the east of the Main Post and the Enlisted Housing area. Typically, the bulk of the EIB train up and testing are done in this area.

=== Kolekole Pass ===
Kolekole Road, which passes through the Enlisted Housing Area and West Post Training Area, leads up to a saddle named Kolekole Pass which allows vehicle traffic to flow between Schofield Barracks and Lualualei Naval Magazine as well as being an intermediate destination for physical training runs by soldiers stationed on Schofield Barracks.

A 37-foot, 35-ton steel cross located at Kolekole Pass was dismantled by the Army in 1997 after Hawaii Citizens for the Separation of State and Church filed a federal lawsuit charging the cross, built with public tax dollars in 1962, was a "blatant and obvious violation" of the First Amendment.

== Education ==
Hawaii Department of Education operates two schools in Schofield Barracks CDP: Samuel K. Solomon Elementary School, and Daniel K. Inouye Elementary School. Solomon Elementary's namesake was a member of the Wolfhounds. The dedication of the original campus was on November 11, 1969, while the dedication of the current facility occurred on November 9, 2019. In the 2016–2017 school year it had 933 students. The Department of Defense's Office of Economic Adjustment funded the construction of the current campus with a $70,248,901. The State of Hawaii added an additional $20,000,000 to the funding. The current campus has four buildings, with each up to two stories tall, and a capacity of above 800. These buildings have 63 classrooms total. Inouye Elementary opened in 1959 as Hale Kula Elementary School, and it was given its current name on April 19, 2016. Some students are, as of 2016, zoned to Wheeler Elementary School.

As of 2016 the zoned secondary schools are Wheeler Middle School and Leilehua High School.

Sergeant Rodney J. T. Yano Library (Building 560), operated by the United States Army's Family and MWR Programs, is in the area. Hawaii State Public Library System operates nearby civilian public libraries.

== 25th Infantry Division Memorial ==
The 25th Infantry Division Memorial consists of four statues, representing the division's soldiers who served in World War II, Korea, Vietnam, and the War on Terrorism (Afghanistan and Iraq). The first statue was unveiled in June 2005, created by Artist Lynn Weiler Liverton.

== In popular culture ==
- Schofield Barracks was the principal setting for the novel From Here to Eternity (1951) by James Jones and the ensuing film of 1953, television mini-series (1979), and musical story (2003) versions.
- Schofield Barracks and its surrounding area were also used for CBS's Tour of Duty TV series.
- Schofield Barracks and its surrounding area were also used for the epic film about the Japanese attack on Pearl Harbor Tora! Tora! Tora! (1970), by 20th Century Fox.

== Climate ==
Schofield Barracks has a tropical savanna climate. Owing to a higher elevation, Schofield is slightly cooler year round than Honolulu, but is still well within the realms of a tropical climate. Precipitation patterns closely resemble those of mediterranean climates being found in mainland California, but its warm winters prevents the climate from being classified as such.

Climate data for Schofield Barracks
Month	Jan	Feb	Mar	Apr	May	Jun	Jul	Aug	Sep	Oct	Nov	Dec	Year
Mean daily maximum °F (°C)	78.2 (25.7)	78.1 (25.6)	79.1 (26.2)	79.5 (26.4)	82.4 (28.0)	85.3 (29.6)	86.6 (30.3)	87.1 (30.6)	87.0 (30.6)	84.7 (29.3)	81.5 (27.5)	78.5 (25.8)	82.4 (28.0)
Daily mean °F (°C)	70.6 (21.4)	69.9 (21.1)	71.5 (21.9)	72.0 (22.2)	74.2 (23.4)	76.5 (24.7)	77.8 (25.4)	78.2 (25.7)	78.1 (25.6)	76.7 (24.8)	74.3 (23.5)	71.3 (21.8)	74.3 (23.5)
Mean daily minimum °F (°C)	62.9 (17.2)	61.7 (16.5)	63.8 (17.7)	64.4 (18.0)	66.0 (18.9)	67.7 (19.8)	69.0 (20.6)	69.3 (20.7)	69.2 (20.7)	68.7 (20.4)	67.0 (19.4)	64.1 (17.8)	66.2 (19.0)
Average precipitation inches (mm)	7.1 (180)	5 (130)	5 (130)	3.5 (89)	1.9 (48)	1 (25)	1.3 (33)	1.4 (36)	1.6 (41)	3 (76)	4.5 (110)	5.4 (140)	40.7 (1,030)

== Demographics ==
Schofield Barracks CDP
- Census-designated place
- Location in Honolulu County and the state of Hawaii

- Location in Hawaii
- Coordinates: 21°29′52″N 158°3′48″W
- Country: United States
- State: Hawaii

Area
  - Total: 2.77 sq mi (7.18 km^{2})
  - Land: 2.77 sq mi (7.18 km^{2})
  - Water: 0 sq mi (0.00 km^{2})
- Elevation: 900 ft (270 m)

Population (2020)
  - Total: 14,904
  - Density: 5,378.0/sq mi (2,076.46/km^{2})
- Time zone: UTC-10 (Hawaii-Aleutian)
- ZIP code: 96857
- Area code: 808
- FIPS code: 15-69050

Historical population
Census	Pop.	Note	%±
2020	14,904		—
U.S. Decennial Census

As of the 2000 census, there were 14,428 people, 2,965 households, and 2,902 families residing in the CDP. The population density was 5,251.5 people per square mile (2,027.6 people/km^{2}). There were 3,733 housing units at an average density of 1,358.7 per square mile (524.6/km^{2}). The racial makeup of the CDP was 56.4% White, 21.9% African American, 1.1% Native American, 3.9% Asian, 1.7% Pacific Islander, 8.6% from other races, and 6.5% from two or more races. Hispanic or Latino of any race were 16.2% of the population.

There were 2,965 households, out of which 78.0% had children under the age of 18 living with them, 91.5% were married couples living together, 4.8% had a female householder with no husband present, and 2.1% were non-families. 2.0% of all households were made up of individuals, and none had someone living alone who was 65 years of age or older. The average household size was 3.55 and the average family size was 3.58.

In the CDP the population was spread out, with 32.1% under the age of 18, 29.8% from 18 to 24, 36.6% from 25 to 44, 1.4% from 45 to 64, and 0.1% who were 65 years of age or older. The median age was 22 years. For every 100 females, there were 152.3 males. For every 100 females age 18 and over, there were 183.6 males.

The median income for a household in the CDP was $33,788, and the median income for a family was $32,970. Males had a median income of $21,112 versus $18,737 for females. The per capita income for the CDP was $12,316. About 6.7% of families and 7.2% of the population were below the poverty line, including 8.5% of those under age 18 and none of those age 65 or over.

== Current Units ==
- Army
  - 25th Infantry Division
  - 8th Military Police Brigade
  - Army CID, Pacific field office
  - 130th Engineer Brigade
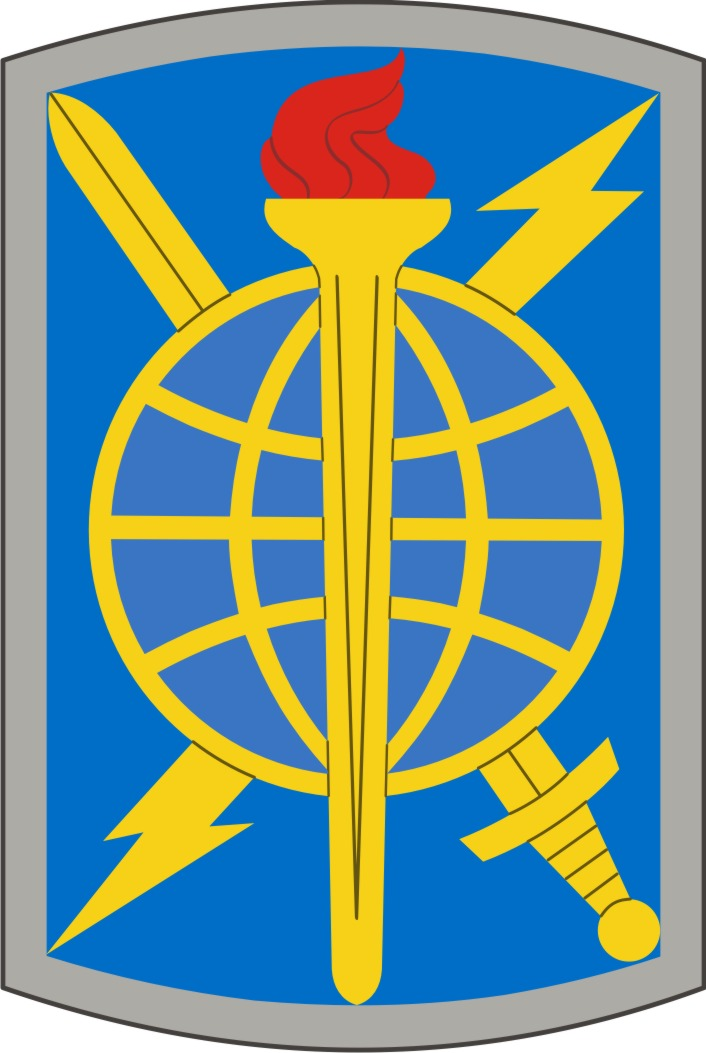
  - 500th Military Intelligence Brigade
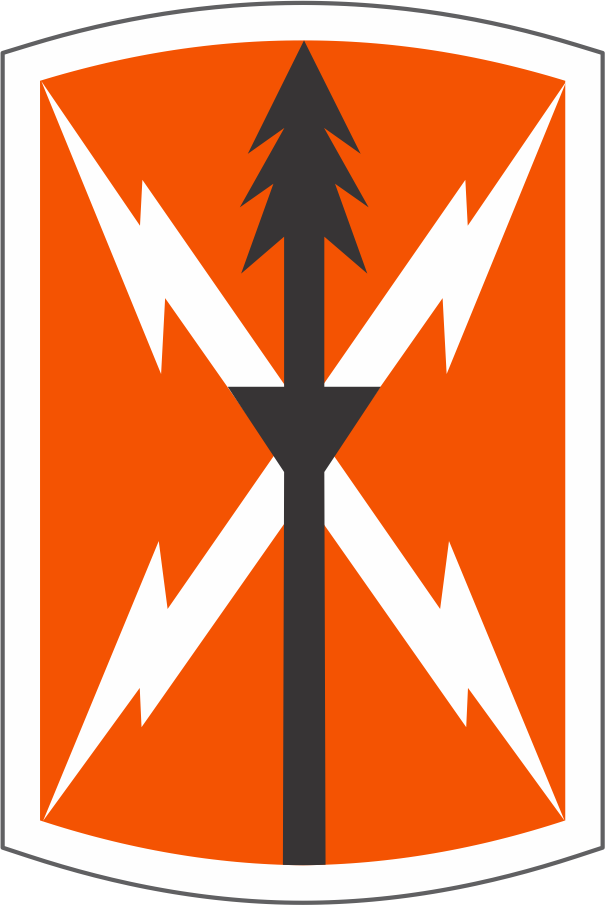
  - 516th Signal Brigade
  - 45th Sustainment Brigade
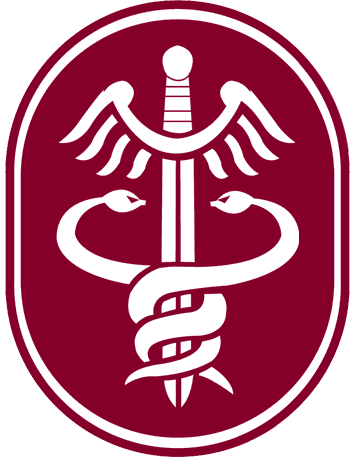
  - US Army Health Clinic-Schofield Barracks
  - U.S. Army Garrison Hawai’i

== See also ==
- HABS/HAER documentation of Schofield Barracks at the Historic American Buildings Survey (HABS) and the Historic American Engineering Record (HAER)
