= Hal Gould =

American photographer

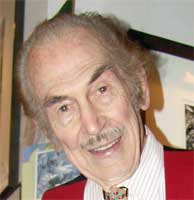
- Born: February 29, 1920; Clark, Wyoming
- Died: June 25, 2015 (aged 95); Denver, Colorado
- Known for: Photography, Art gallery curator

Hal Gould (February 29, 1920 – June 25, 2015) was an American photographer and gallery curator. He was an advocate of fine art photography and created a venue which eventually became the Camera Obscura gallery at the Denver Art Museum.

== Early life ==
Gould was born in Clark, Wyoming. He grew up on a ranch in New Mexico and left home at the age of 16. After holding a number of different jobs, he entered dentistry school, but was drafted into the army in 1940. After he was called to duty, he joined E Company, 19th Infantry where he served together with James Jones. Eventually he entered officer school and became a head personnel officer. After the bombing of Pearl Harbor, he island-hopped with General Douglas MacArthur and remained in Japan during the occupation.

== Photography ==
While Gould held many jobs during his life, including railroad-tie repairer, boxer, aviator, and painter, it was his pursuit of photography that would change his life. For nearly a quarter of a century he practised as a portrait photographer, eventually shifting into fine art photography. Gould's own photographic contributions to Camera Obscura Gallery include Western scenery and flora along with pictures from his various travels

== Gallery curator ==
Gould repeatedly asked for the Denver Art Museum to display fine art photography, but director Otto Bach refused to consider the medium. To make artistic photography available to the public, Gould and others created a venue for displaying works directly behind the Denver Art Museum—eventually this would become the gallery Camera Obscura. This is now one of the oldest galleries dedicated exclusively to fine art photography. Gould's gallery gave Sebastião Salgado his first show in America, and has been publishing the Photography in the Fine Arts Quarterly since 1983.

Gould hosted his last show as curator of Camera Obscura Gallery, featuring his works and those by Gallery associate director Loretta Young-Gautier, and then closed the Gallery doors to the public after the conclusion of the open house reception for their show on April 30, 2011. According to the March 20, 2011, article in The Denver Post, Gould cites "No sales" brought on by the recent recession as the reason for closing the Gallery. Gould died on June 25, 2015, at the age of 95.
