= Some Came Running (novel) =

Novel by James Jones, published in 1957

- First edition
- Author: James Jones
- Language: English
- Publisher: Charles Scribner's Sons
- Publication date: January 10, 1958
- Publication place: United States
- Media type: Print (hardcover & paperback)
- Pages: 1,266 (first edition, hard)
- Preceded by: From Here to Eternity (1951)
- Followed by: The Pistol (1959)

Some Came Running is a novel by James Jones, published in 1958. It was Jones's second published novel, following his award-winning debut From Here to Eternity. It is the story of a war veteran with literary aspirations who returns in 1948 to his hometown of Parkman, Illinois, after a failed writing career. It is a thinly disguised autobiographical novel of Jones's experiences in his hometown of Robinson, Illinois, immediately after returning from World War II. The title alludes to the lines in Chapter 10:17 of the Gospel of St. Mark, (Note: Mark 10:17, King James Version: "And when He was gone forth into the way, there came one running, and kneeled to him, and asked Him, Good Master, what shall I do that I may inherit eternal life?") which author James Jones used as an epigraph before the beginning of the novel.

A film version starring Frank Sinatra, Dean Martin and Shirley MacLaine was released the same year and was nominated for five Academy Awards.

== Plot ==
Dave Hirsh is a cynical Army veteran and an occasionally published but generally unsuccessful pre-war writer, who winds up in his hometown of Parkman, Illinois after being put on a bus in Chicago while intoxicated.

Hirsh had left Parkman 19 years before when his older brother Frank placed him in a charity boarding school, and is still embittered. Frank has since married well, inherited a jewelry business from the father of his wife Agnes, and made their social status his highest priority. Dave's return threatens this state of affairs, so Frank makes a fruitless stab at arranging respectability, introducing him to his friend Professor Bob French and his beautiful daughter Gwen, a schoolteacher (who are familiar with his writing). Dave, having planned to visit Parkman for only a week, impulsively decides to settle in Parkman to pursue Gwen romantically and attempt to write a novel with her help.

While Frank and Agnes are members at the local country club, Dave moves in different social circles. He befriends Bama Dillert, a hard-drinking southern gambler who has serendipitously settled in Parkman. Dave moves in with Bama, and they regularly gamble together, sometimes going on road trips to do so. Several young, aimless WWII veterans hang around Dave and Bama in Parkman's bars, joined by Wally Dennis, the boyfriend of Frank's daughter Dawn, and an aspiring writer himself. When Dawn marries another boy in town, Wally enlists in the Army after attending their wedding, even though he had been working with Gwen on his own novel. Three girls who work at the town brassiere plant, Rosalie, Mildred, and Ginnie, also hang around the local bars and are sexually available to Dave and his group of friends. Over the next year, while unsuccessfully trying to pursue a romance with Gwen (they have a meaningful connection but do not sleep together), Dave starts regularly sleeping with Ginnie, who is the least attractive of the trio, but easiest to persuade to go to bed with.

Frank is unfaithful to Agnes, carrying on affairs with the wife of his store manager, and then with his secretary, Edith. Agnes finds out both times and forces Frank to end the affairs. As Dawn leaves for college, they adopt a son named Walter. Frank schemes to buy farmland outside of town that will be used to build a highway bypass around Parkman, and fulfills plans to develop the land into a shopping center and motel. These succeed at making Frank wealthy (nearly a millionaire) and more respected in town, but he is miserable at home with Agnes. He occasionally walks around town at night trying to peep into people's windows.

Eventually Ginnie visits Gwen at the Frenches' house and begs Gwen to not take Dave away from her. Horrified to learn that Dave has been sleeping with Ginnie (regarded by many in town as "the biggest hore [sic] in Parkman"), Gwen decisively rejects Dave and leaves town. Saddened by Gwen's rejection and Bama's decline from alcoholism and diabetes, disgusted by Frank's hypocrisy and social climbing, and conflicted by his feelings for Ginnie, Dave nonetheless marries Ginnie and goes to work in a defense plant while continuing to work on his writing. As Dave tires of his work at the defense plant and Ginnie becomes more materialistic, their marriage goes downhill and Dave decides to leave town. As he walks through town at night during Parkman's Centennial Celebration, Ginnie's jealous, drunken ex-husband, who had followed her to Parkman, stalks and shoots Dave in the face, killing him. (In the 1958 film version, Ginnie's ex is a Chicago hoodlum, and Dave is only wounded, while Ginnie is shot in the back and killed after throwing herself in front of Dave.) Gwen and Bob finish the edits on Dave's manuscript (a "comic combat novel") and arrange for it to be published.

The book's plot, taking place in peacetime civilian life, is framed by two short war episodes printed in italics: the prologue depicting Hirsh's experiences in the Second World War, describing Germans attacking during the Battle of the Bulge ("They came running through the fog..."), and the epilogue having Wally Dennis fighting Chinese Communists ("They came running through the paddy fields...") and getting killed in the Korean War. Wally's last thought before being killed in a grenade explosion is of the manuscript he would never complete.

== Critical reception ==
The book was savaged by the critics. Orville Prescott of The New York Times called it "a fictional disaster, clumsily written, crudely repetitious, ineptly unconvincing in many scenes, cheaply vulgar throughout. 'Some Came Running' is also so gamey and rancid in its concentration on sex that it seems like the work of an adolescent obsessed by the Kinsey reports. It is a very great pity."

Whitney Balliett of The New Yorker called the book "Twelve hundred and sixty-six pages of flawlessly sustained tedium." Robert Brustein in Commentary called it "a very bad book indeed, self-conscious, discursive, ineptly plotted, and clumsily written.... The reader is battered into helpless insensibility by Jones' analyses, explanations, theories, and opinions."

David Sanders of The Washington Post was somewhat more positive, writing that while "A 1266-page novel inevitably reveals a whole catalogue of the writer's weaknesses ... Jones' strengths are genuinely impressive nevertheless. He can make ordinary human beings seem extraordinarily important. He can give meaning to the most apparently trivial utterances ... Most important of all, he never loses sight of his scope, the large design which drives him to his writing."

The book was lavishly praised for its vividness, characterization and scope in the New York Herald Tribune.

Due to frequent "misspelled" words and punctuation errors, critics were generally harsh, not recognizing that such elements were a conscious style choice by Jones to evoke the provincialism of the novel's characters and setting.

== Film adaptation ==
The book was adapted into a 1958 American film directed by Vincente Minnelli and starring Frank Sinatra, Dean Martin and Shirley MacLaine.
