= The Thin Red Line (novel) =

1962 novel by James Jones

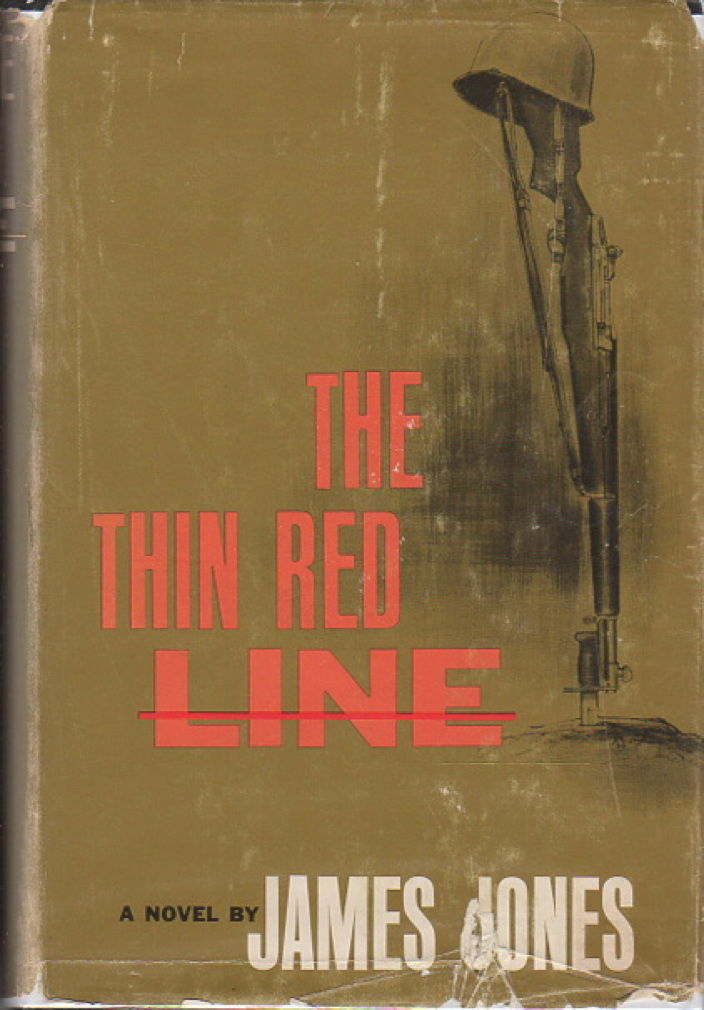
- First edition
- Author: James Jones
- Language: English
- Genre: War novel
- Publisher: Charles Scribner's Sons
- Publication date: September 17, 1962
- Publication place: United States
- Media type: Print (hardback & paperback)
- Pages: 510
- OCLC: 7640500

The Thin Red Line is American author James Jones's fourth novel. It draws heavily on Jones's experiences at the Battle of Mount Austen, the Galloping Horse, and the Sea Horse during World War II's Guadalcanal campaign. The author served in the United States Army's 27th Infantry Regiment, 25th Infantry Division.

== Novel ==
The Thin Red Line, originally published in September 1962, shares its central characters with Jones's other two World War II novels, though with their names necessarily altered, and examines their different reactions to combat. Jones had originally intended the central male characters of his previous war novel From Here to Eternity to appear in this work. But Jones remarked that "the dramatic structure—I might even say the spiritual content—of the first book demanded that Prewitt be killed at the end of it". Jones tackled the problem by changing the names of the three characters of the first novel, enabling them to appear in The Thin Red Line. The character of Prewitt became Witt, Warden became Welsh and Stark became Storm. (Jones's later novel Whistle (1978), features a similar set of characters, now named Sergeant Mart Winch, Bobby Prell, and Johnny "Mother" Strange; Corporal Fife in The Thin Red Line also reappears as company clerk Marion Landers in Whistle.)

The novel portrays battle realistically, including several particularly gruesome acts depicted as natural responses to the soldiers' environment, such as the disinterring of a Japanese corpse for fun, the summary execution of Japanese prisoners, and the extraction of their corpses' gold teeth. The novel explores the idea that modern war is a deeply personal and lonely experience in which each soldier suffers the emotional horrors of war by himself.

James Jones wrote his novel based on his personal experiences during the battle of the Galloping Horse, the Sea Horse, and Kokumbona which he renamed "The Dancing Elephant", "The Sea Slug", and "Bunabala". Of particular significance, Jones recounts his own experience killing a Japanese soldier with his bare hands.

The title draws influence from the Midwestern saying "There's only a thin line between the sane and the mad" and from Rudyard Kipling's poem "Tommy", from the collection Barrack-Room Ballads, in which Kipling describes foot soldiers as "the thin red line of 'eroes". Kipling's poem is based on the 1854 action of British soldiers during the Crimean War called The Thin Red Line (Battle of Balaclava).

== Reception ==
Kirkus Reviews praised the novel in 1962, commenting that the novel's "well-drawn battle narrative provides take-off points for dozens of character studies, and the author describes emotional responses to battle, fear, death, homosexuality, along with detached, ironic comments on army organization and the workings of fate, luck and circumstance". Paul Christle, speaking at a conference in 2002, said of the novel, "The Thin Red Line is the only novel of Jones's war quartet that actually deals with combat, and it pulls no punches in its treatment. Reviewers, critics and scholars have lauded it for its realism. Some, myself included, would place the novel in the domain of literary naturalism because the destinies of Jones's soldiers are determined by chance and by social, economic, psychological, and political forces beyond their control and, sometimes, even beyond their recognition".

British historian and military writer John Keegan nominated The Thin Red Line as, in his opinion, one of only two novels portraying Second World War combat that could be favorably compared to the best of the literature to arise from the First World War (the other was Flesh Wounds (1966) by British writer David Holbrook). Paul Fussell said that it was "perhaps the best" American WWII novel, better than A Walk in the Sun and The Naked and the Dead.

The game writer Dan Houser, writer of the Red Dead Redemption and Grand Theft Auto games, has praised the novel, calling it one of his favourites, praising its depiction of the terror of war, the psychological isolation of its characters, and the characters' complexity.

== Film versions ==
The novel has been adapted for cinema twice, first as Andrew Marton's The Thin Red Line in 1964, then as Terrence Malick's The Thin Red Line in 1998.
