= Whistle (novel) =

1978 novel by James Jones

- First edition
- Author: James Jones
- Cover artist: Paul Bacon
- Language: English
- Genre: War novel
- Published: 1978 Delacorte Press
- Publication place: United States
- Media type: Print (Paperback)
- Pages: 457 pp
- ISBN: 0-440-09548-4
- OCLC: 3223758
- Dewey Decimal: 813/.5/4
- LC Class: PZ4.J77 Wh PS3560.O49

Whistle (1978), a novel by James Jones, tells the story of four wounded South Pacific veterans brought back by hospital ship to the United States during World War II. Much of the story takes place in a veterans hospital in the fictional city of Luxor, Tennessee (based on the city of Memphis).

Whistle forms the third part of a war trilogy, after From Here to Eternity (1951) and The Thin Red Line (1962). Jones presented the characters of Mart Winch, Bobby Prell, Marion Landers, and Johnny Strange as Welsh, Witt, Fife, and Storm in The Thin Red Line.

James Jones died in 1977 before finishing the novel. The final three chapters were completed by Willie Morris based on taped conversations with the author and extensive notes he had already written. Jones expected that his novel would say, "Just about everything I have ever had to say, or will ever have to say, on the human condition of war."

== Critical reception ==
In a 1978 book review in Kirkus Reviews, an anonymous reviewer called the novel "a truly gratifying recovery of Jones' reputation after a long slump since the holding action of The Thin Red Line." The review summarized; "This is at its best an almost mystical book in which the inner psychology of soldiering is much like that of the doom-driven warriors of Homer who hear the gods whistling up their spines—and Jones' dense, long-lined prose has never been more Homeric. Those who have found him crude and verbose in the past will probably not change their minds over Whistle. But admirers of Eternity and Thin Red Line will find him striving to draw the last sparks and puffs from his great single subject—manhood tested by combat—and will feel that he succeeds decisively enough to make this the last third of the great American WW II novel."

In a 1978 review in The New York Times, John Aldridge wrote; "it is perhaps testimony Mr. Morris”s skill at synopsis or to Jones's deficiencies as a writer of recognizable style that one can scarcely tell where the original text ends and the synopsis begins." In The New York Review of Books, Thomas Edwards wrote "even if Jones was a novelist who aimed for, and often enough achieved, something beyond mastery of technique and style, no assessment of Whistle can avoid saying that it is a very badly written book."
