= Gentleman ranker =

British Army upper-class enlisted soldier

Historically, in the British Army, a gentleman ranker was an enlisted soldier who is suited through education and social background to be a commissioned officer, or is indeed a former commissioned officer. Rudyard Kipling titled one of his poems, which was published in 1892, "Gentlemen-Rankers".

== British Army ==
The term "gentleman ranker" suggests that the soldier was born into wealth and privilege, but disgraced himself and so has enlisted as a common soldier (or one of the other ranks) serving apart from the society that now scorns him. That fate was similar to that of a remittance man, often the black sheep of a "good" family, who was paid a regular allowance to stay abroad, far from home, where he could not embarrass the family.

The gentleman rankers also included the soldiers who signed on specifically as "gentleman volunteers" in the British Army to serve as private soldiers with the understanding being that they would be given a commission (without purchase) at a later date. The men trained and fought as private soldiers but "messed" (dined and perhaps socialized) with the officers and were thus afforded a social standing of somewhere in between them.

With growing social mobility and the rising standard of education for army entrants, the term is becoming archaic. Soldiers from a titled, landed or privately-educated background may still be considered gentleman rankers.

=== Examples ===
Perhaps the most famous gentleman ranker of the 20th century was T. E. Lawrence. He retired from the British army after World War I with the rank of colonel but rejoined the military as an enlisted man by using an assumed name.

The poet Samuel Taylor Coleridge left Jesus College, Cambridge in December 1793 and enlisted as a private in the 15th Light Dragoons under the name "Silas Tomkyn Comberbache", perhaps because of debt accrued at College or because a girl that he loved, Mary Evans, had rejected him. His brothers were able to ensure his discharge a few months later on grounds of temporary insanity and he was able to return to Cambridge, although he never earned a degree, nor did he marry Mary Evans.

Herbert Housman, brother of the poet A.E. Housman is perhaps a more characteristic example. He left a medical course and enlisted in the British Army, dying, aged thirty three, in the Second Boer War.

Peter Ustinov was from a family of Eastern European noble extraction and attended Westminster School, but he failed to receive a British Army commission during the Second World War, in part because of persistent jokes and witticisms while being interviewed by the Officer Selection Board. He enlisted as a private, and was only able to work alongside his friend David Niven (himself an officer) as part of Entertainments National Service Association by being made Niven's batman (personal servant).

== Kipling's poem ==
The poem in Barrack-Room Ballads (1892)

The term appears in several of Rudyard Kipling's stories and as the title of a poem that he wrote; it appeared in Barrack-Room Ballads, and Other Verses, first series, published in 1892, and T. S. Eliot included it in his 1941 collection, A Choice of Kipling's Verse.

In Kipling's poem "Gentlemen-Rankers", the speaker "sings":

If the home we never write to, and the oaths we never keep,
And all we know most distant and most dear,
Across the snoring barrack-room return to break our sleep,
Can you blame us if we soak ourselves in beer?
When the drunken comrade mutters and the great guard-lantern gutters
And the horror of our fall is written plain,
Every secret, self-revealing on the aching whitewashed ceiling,
Do you wonder that we drug ourselves from pain?

We have done with Hope and Honour, we are lost to Love and Truth,
We are dropping down the ladder rung by rung,
And the measure of our torment is the measure of our youth.
God help us, for we knew the worst too young!
Our shame is clean repentance for the crime that brought the sentence,
Our pride it is to know no spur of pride,
And the Curse of Reuben holds us till an alien turf enfolds us
And we die, and none can tell Them where we died.
We're poor little lambs who've lost our way,
Baa! Baa! Baa!
We're little black sheep who've gone astray,
Baa—aa—aa!
Gentlemen-rankers out on the spree,
Damned from here to Eternity,
God ha' mercy on such as we,
Baa! Yah! Bah!

— Stanzas 3-4

In the poem, "machinely crammed" indicates the use of a Latin "crammer" and the general method of learning by rote; a somewhat mechanical process. The Empress is Queen Victoria, specifically in her role as Empress of India. Ready tin means easy access to money. Branded with the blasted worsted spur refers to the emblem of a spur, embroidered with worsted wool, that was sewn onto the uniforms of highly skilled riding masters of the British Army. The Curse of Reuben refers to the Biblical story of Reuben, who, for sexual misconduct, was told by his dying father, "Reuben, thou art my firstborn .... Unstable as water, thou shalt not excel...." (Genesis 49:3-4).

=== Adaptations of and references to the poem ===
Kipling's poem, in translation, was set to music by Edvard Grieg in 1900 (EG 156, Gentlemen-Menige.) However, after he had completed it, he received a copy of the English original and was so dismayed by the omission of important passages that he did not publish it; it was published posthumously in 1991.

The poem was set to music and sung at Harvard and Yale Universities in the early 1900s. It became associated with one collegiate a cappella group in particular, The Whiffenpoofs of Yale. Their historian states that the song was known "as far back as 1902" and was popular by 1907–1909. The words were famously adapted by Meade Minnigerode and George Pomeroy to become "The Whiffenpoof Song". In turn, it has been covered by many singers, including Bing Crosby and Rudy Vallee.

James Jones's award-winning 1951 bestseller From Here to Eternity, which is about American soldiers in Hawaii before the US entered World War II, takes its title from Kipling's poem. In Robert Heinlein's novel Starship Troopers (1959), the poem is sung at marching cadence by Mobile Infantry officer cadets.

Billy Bragg borrows part of the poem in his song "Island of No Return" on his 1984 album Brewing Up with Billy Bragg: "Me and the corporal out on the spree, Damned from here to Eternity". Peter Bellamy set it to music and recorded it in 1990 for his privately-issued cassette Soldiers Three. That recording was also included in 2012 on the CD reissue of Peter Bellamy Sings the Barrack-Room Ballads of Rudyard Kipling.

The song is spoken of in The Road to Kalamata, a memoir by soldier of fortune Mike Hoare, who led several mercenary companies during the bush wars in the Katanga and the former Belgian Congo during the 1960s.

Eliza Carthy recorded Peter Bellamy's setting of the poem on her 2019 album "Restitute" Her version is sung a capella and repeats the "chorus" of Kipling's poem several times, which do not appear in the original text.

== See also ==
- Artists Rifles (which included artists and other professionals)
- Temporary gentlemen (officers, particularly wartime, from outside the usual "officer class")
