= A Soldier's Daughter Never Cries (film) =

1998 film by James Ivory

- Theatrical release poster
- Directed by: James Ivory
- Screenplay by: James Ivory; Ruth Prawer Jhabvala
- Based on: A Soldier's Daughter Never Cries by Kaylie Jones
- Produced by: Ismail Merchant
- Starring: Kris Kristofferson; Barbara Hershey; Leelee Sobieski; Jane Birkin; Dominique Blanc; Jesse Bradford; Anthony Roth Costanzo; Harley Cross; Isaac De Bankolé; Virginie Ledoyen
- Cinematography: Jean-Marc Fabre
- Edited by: Noëlle Boisson
- Music by: Richard Robbins
- Production companies: Merchant Ivory Productions; October Films; Capitol Films; British Screen
- Distributed by: October Films (United States); Roseland Film Distribution (United Kingdom); 20th Century Fox (France)
- Release dates: September 4, 1998 (Venice); September 19, 1998 (United States); October 9, 1998 (United Kingdom); April 21, 1999 (France)
- Running time: 127 minutes
- Countries: United States; United Kingdom; France
- Languages: English; French
- Box office: $1.8 million

A Soldier's Daughter Never Cries is a 1998 drama film directed by James Ivory from a screenplay he co-wrote with Ruth Prawer Jhabvala. It stars Kris Kristofferson, Barbara Hershey, Leelee Sobieski, and Jesse Bradford. The film is a fictionalized account of the family life of writer James Jones and is based on Kaylie Jones' novel of the same name.

Structured as a novel, the film is divided into three segments each named after a different protagonist. The plot follows an expatriate American family living in Paris during the 1960s and 1970s until their return and adjustment to life in New England, seen from the daughter's point of view.

== Plot ==
Bill Willis, a successful American novelist and World War II veteran, is living in Paris in the 1960s with his family. He is much loved by his free-spirited, unpredictable wife Marcella. The couple, popular on the Paris cocktail-party circuit, has a six-year-old daughter, Channe (short for Charlotte Anne). Marcella yearns to have another child, but a series of miscarriages has made that difficult. However, the family circle expands when a six-year old French boy, Benoit, is brought to their home for adoption. The child's biological mother, a beautiful young unmarried girl, has been unable to care for him, and he has been shipped through so many orphanages and foster homes that at first he hesitates to unpack his suitcase. Having feared rejection, the little boy is surprised by the love he receives in his new surroundings. After Benoit becomes acclimated to his new family, he asks that his name be changed to Billy after his adoptive father.

Billy's presence prompts young Channe to turn to her protective Portuguese nanny Candida. Initially jealous of her new brother, Channe quickly warms to him, inviting him to share her bed after he wets his. Shortly after enrolling both kids into school, Marcella physically confronts a stern teacher for the way she disciplined Billy after he threw sand in a classmates face. Channe notices the culture clash at her bilingual school, the flirtatious circle of friends around her parents, the vulgarity of American children who visit, and an encounter with a French boy who tries to seduce Channe with the help of large snails; he insists that she take off her shirt and let them crawl on her skin.

When Billy and Channe become teenagers, a strong friendship develops between Channe and Francis Fortescue, a flamboyantly effeminate youth with a passion for opera. The fatherless Francis lives with his eccentric expatriate British mother. He helps Channe test her wings as a nonconformist. Fear of love makes Candida rejects a proposal of marriage from her long-suffering African boyfriend Mamadou. As Channe begins to be interested in other boys, she distances herself from Francis, who confesses to her that he had a little crush on her. The family's French idyll is disrupted when Bill Willis plans a return to the United States because he wants American doctors to treat his heart condition

The family moves to New England during the 1970s. Their future is threatened by Bill's declining health, Marcella's alcoholism, and Channe and Billy's struggle to adapt to their new American high school. Billy, awkward and reserved, is bullied at school. Channe drifts from boy to boy, giving sex in exchange for acceptance, which results in her developing a reputation of being "fast"; Bill realizes this upon visiting the school. Channe falls for fellow classmate Keith, but is reluctant to approach him due to her reputation. Bill gives her dating advice & tells Channe to bring Keith for a visit so that Bill can size him up. The advice works; Bill approves of Keith & they begin dating. Marcella becomes pregnant, but gives birth to a stillborn son. Billy takes the death of his baby brother the hardest.

While immersed in the writing of a new novel, Bill continues to worry about the future of his family following his death. It is revealed that Bill was given a diary from Billy's biological teenage mother. Bill has kept the diary all these years, anticipating that one day, Billy would want to know about his origins. Billy becomes depressed due to a combination of Bill's illness, being bullied at school, and questions about his parentage. Marcella notices this change and tries to coax him out of it, to no avail. As Bill's illness worsens, Channe helps him write his novel, causing the decline of her relationship with Keith.

Bill's death affects his wife and children deeply. The event pulls Billy out of his depressive state and he begins to help his grief-stricken mother take care of the house as the family slowly adjusts to Bill's absence in their everyday lives. Marcella gives Billy the diary of his biological mother; although he takes a glance, he is ultimately disinterested. The films ends with Channe and Billy playing music to cheer Marcella up. They all dance outside as the sun sets.

== Cinematography ==
Filming took eleven weeks, of which four took place in France and seven in America. Ivory wanted to use a French director to film the section set in America: "The family feels displaced in their new, less glamorous suburban surroundings, and Ivory wanted the audience to see this world through the eyes of someone who was "fresh and not jaded by having lived there and seen it a million times."" Cinematographer Fabre has spoken about the simple, almost all one-camera, approach he took to the film, and the decision to film faster and less deliberately than some other Merchant Ivory films. There were difficulties with the location in Paris, "solved to some degree -- especially during nighttime party scenes often filmed during the day -- by simply avoiding the windows, a strategy which lends a close intimate feel that happens to be entirely appropriate to the story".

== Cast ==
- Kris Kristofferson as Bill Willis
- Barbara Hershey as Marcella Willis
- Leelee Sobieski as Charlotte Anne "Channe" Willis
- Jane Birkin as Mrs. Fortescue
- Dominique Blanc as Candida
- Jesse Bradford as Billy Willis
- Harley Cross as Keith Carter
- Isaac De Bankolé as Mamadou
- Macha Méril as Madame Beauvier
- Nathalie Richard as Mademoiselle Fournier
- Anthony Roth Costanzo as Francis Fortescue
- Bob Swaim as Bob Smith
- Virginie Ledoyen as Benoit's Mother

== Reception ==
The film garnered a favorable critical reaction, holding a fresh rating of 80% on Rotten Tomatoes based on 25 reviews. Metacritic gave the film an average score of 66/100, indicating "generally favorable" reviews.

Roger Ebert of the Chicago Sun-Times rated the film three and half stars out of a possible four, commenting: "The film's appeal is in the details. It re-creates a childhood of wonderfully strange friends, eccentric visitors, a Paris that was more home for the children than for the parents and a homecoming that was fraught for them all".

Online film critic James Berardinelli gave the film a favorable review: "Not only was I touched by the characters and engrossed by their story during the 120 minutes they were on screen, but I could have easily spent another hour or two with them".

In the words of Jonathan Rosenbaum, writing for the Chicago Reader: "The three parts add up to a rather lumpy narrative, and the characters are perceived through a kind of affectionate recollection that tends to idealize them, but they're so beautifully realized that they linger like cherished friends".
