= A Soldier's Daughter Never Cries (novel) =

1990 novel by Kaylie Jones

- First edition
- Author: Kaylie Jones
- Genre: Autobiographic fiction
- Published: Bantam Books, 1990; Akashic Books, 2003 (reissue)
- Media type: Book
- Pages: 203
- ISBN: 9781888451467
- OCLC: 59311418

A Soldier's Daughter Never Cries is a semi-autobiographical novel by Kaylie Jones, the daughter of American author James Jones. It describes her childhood in Paris in the 1960s, her struggles adjusting to her parents' adoption of a French boy, Benoit, and the family's later cultural transition when they return to the United States.

This novel was first published in 1990 by Bantam Books, and was reissued in 2003 by Akashic Books.

This novel was also adapted for the screen as A Soldier's Daughter Never Cries by James Ivory in 1998.
