= James Jones (author) =

American author (1921–1977)

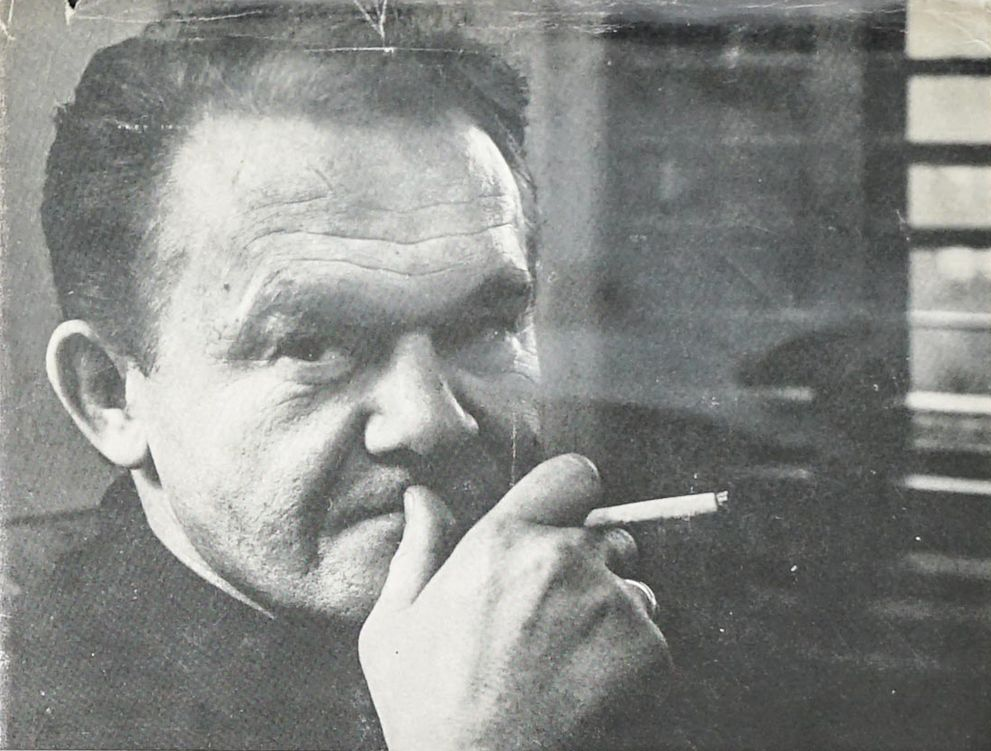
- Photo of Jones from the back cover of The Thin Red Line.
- Born: James Ramon Jones; November 6, 1921; Robinson, Illinois, U.S.
- Died: May 9, 1977 (aged 55); Southampton, New York, U.S.
- Occupations: Novelist, author
- Writing career
- Period: 1951–1975
- Genre: World War II fiction
- Notable awards: National Book Award; 1952
- Military career
- Allegiance: United States of America
- Branch: United States Army
- Service years: 1939–1944
- Rank: Corporal
- Units: 25th Infantry Division; 27th Infantry Regiment
- Conflicts: World War II
- Awards: Purple Heart

James Ramon Jones (November 6, 1921 – May 9, 1977) was an American novelist renowned for his explorations of World War II and its aftermath. He won the 1952 National Book Award for his debut novel, From Here to Eternity, which was adapted for film a year later (and went on to win the Academy Award for Best Picture) and made into a television series a generation later.

== Life ==
James Ramon Jones was born and raised in Robinson, Illinois, the son of Ramon and Ada M. (née Blessing) Jones. He enlisted in the United States Army in 1939 at the age of 17 and served in the 25th Infantry Division, 27th Infantry Regiment before and during World War II, first in Hawaii at Schofield Barracks on Oahu, then in combat on Guadalcanal at the Battle of Mount Austen, the Galloping Horse, and the Sea Horse, where he was wounded in his head. He returned to the US after an operation on his ankle, and was discharged in July 1944. He also worked as a journalist covering the Vietnam War.

It was in the Army that Jones decided he would be a writer, or as he put it, "I realized I had been a writer all my life without knowing it or without having written."

His wartime experiences inspired some of his most famous works, the so-called war trilogy. He witnessed the Japanese attack on Pearl Harbor, which led to his first published novel, From Here to Eternity (1951). The Thin Red Line (1962) reflected his combat experiences on Guadalcanal, and Whistle (posthumous, 1978) was based on his hospital stay in Memphis, Tennessee, recovering from surgery on an ankle he had reinjured on the island.

Jones was the father of two children, including Kaylie Jones, an author best known for A Soldier's Daughter Never Cries, a thinly veiled memoir of the Joneses' life in Paris during the 1960s. (His son Jamie Jones was adopted in France.) Kaylie Jones's novel was made into a film starring Kris Kristofferson, Barbara Hershey and Leelee Sobieski in 1998. The release of this film, along with the 1998 release of a new film version of The Thin Red Line, directed by Terrence Malick and produced by Robert Michael Geisler and John Roberdeau, sparked a revival of interest in James Jones's life and works. In 2011, Ms. Jones was instrumental in publishing an uncensored edition of James Jones's From Here to Eternity.

Jones was open about his same-sex experiences and would base the sexually ambiguous character of Corporal Fife in The Thin Red Line on himself.

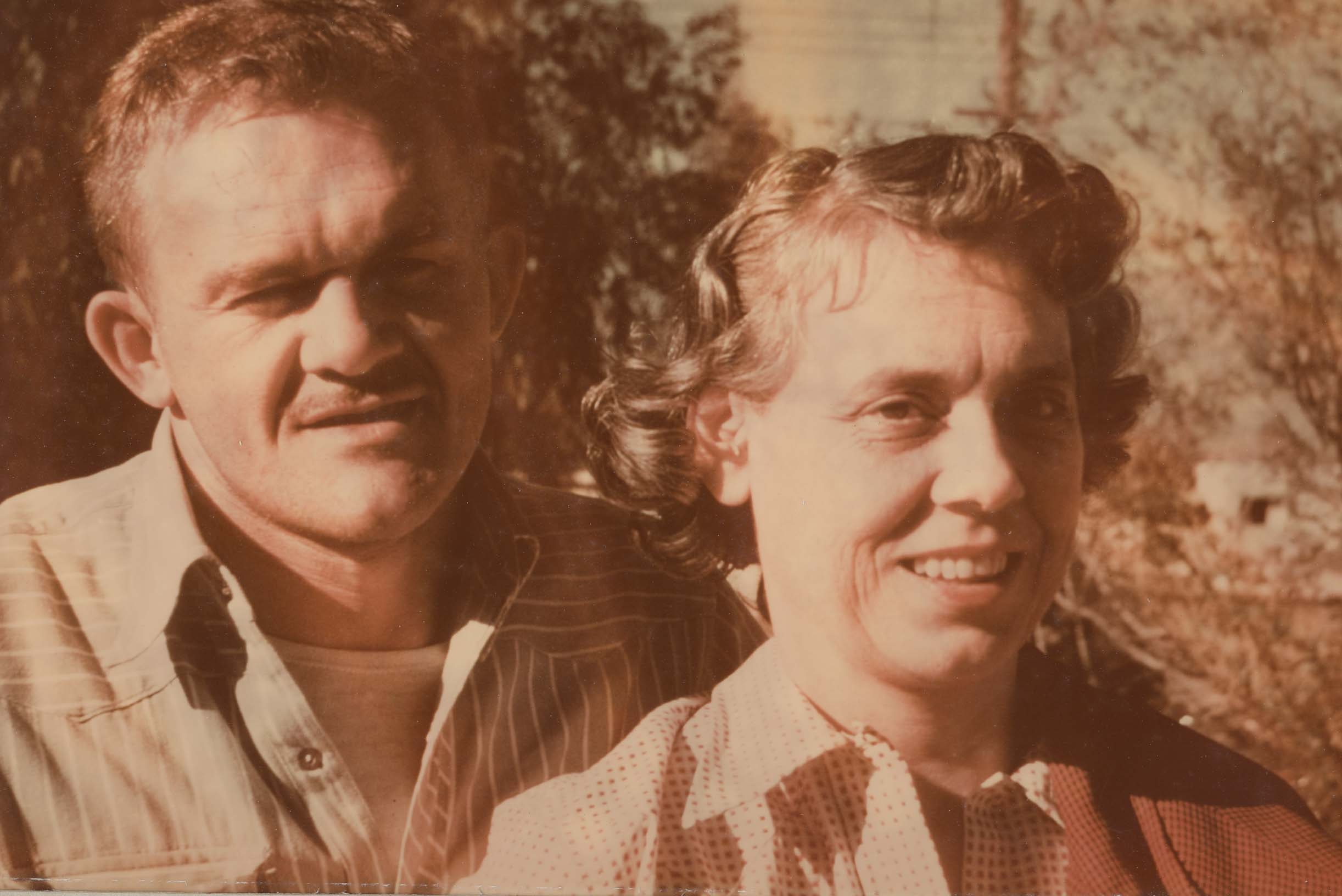
James Jones and Lowney Handy

In May 1951, LIFE magazine devoted several pages to Jones and Lowney Handy (b. 1904), beginning with their first meeting in November 1943 when the veteran returned to Robinson, and her support for his writing prior to formation of what is described as the "Handy Artists Group"—From Here to Eternity is given considerable mention, but there is none of any Jones-Handy romantic relationship.

Jones assisted in the 1950 formation of the Handy Writers' Colony in Marshall, Illinois, by his then-lover Lowney Handy and her husband Harry Handy. It was funded partly by Harry and, after the financial success of From Here to Eternity, partly by Jones. Originally conceived as a Utopian commune where budding artists could focus exclusively on their writing projects, the colony dissolved after only a few years, because Jones relocated to France following his marriage to actress Gloria Mosolino after a jealous Lowney attacked her, leaving the colony back in a financially compromised situation in 1957. However, the colony's decline was largely due to Lowney's continued erratic, possessive, and controlling behavior, particularly toward Jones. Poet David Ray commented to George Garrett:

I cannot possibly convey to you the intensity of Lowney's power. It was charismatic and demonic. Since she used some of the same brainwashing methods to assure the loyalty of her young disciples and was from the same part of the country, I've often wondered if the James Jones of Jonestown knew of her, or perhaps visited her. . . She was a very violent woman, and unyielding in her jealous possessiveness of her charges, of whom Jones was the chief one. Her control of the community was legend: I saw her tell the Chief of Police what to do, and she boasted of being 'above good and evil.' She may well have been. Anyway, to understand Jones you have to understand Lowney and the intensity of their relationship.

Jones died in Southampton, New York, of congestive heart failure and is buried in Poxabogue-Evergreen Cemetery, Bridgehampton, New York. His papers are now held at the Harry Ransom Center at the University of Texas at Austin. His widow, Gloria, died on June 9, 2006. Many of James Jones's books are still available in digital format, including excerpts from They Shall Inherit the Laughter, published as To the End of the War.

== Work ==
Jones called his first novel They Shall Inherit the Laughter. It was a thinly disguised autobiographical novel of his experiences in Robinson immediately after World War II. After several rejections—with various complaints and claims about the work being too shrill and lacking perspective—he abandoned it and began writing From Here to Eternity.

Charles Scribner's Sons published Eternity in 1951, and it won the annual U.S. National Book Award for Fiction. The Modern Library Board later named it one of the 100 best novels of the 20th century. Jones was later hired to write the screen treatment for the 1953 adaptation, but withdrew after disagreements with Harry Cohn of Columbia Pictures.

His second published novel, Some Came Running (1957), had its roots in the abandoned first effort. In contrast to Eternity, it was savaged by critics. They were especially harsh about the frequently misspelled words and punctuation errors; they did not recognize that such elements were a conscious style choice by Jones to evoke the provinciality of the novel's characters and setting. Jones apparently played around with this style in several short stories written at about the same time as Some Came Running (later collected in The Ice-Cream Headache and Other Stories), only to abandon it by the time he finished The Thin Red Line in 1962, in favor of the blunt but more grammatically sound style associated with him today. Some Came Running was immediately adapted as a film starring Frank Sinatra, Dean Martin, and Shirley MacLaine, which was critically acclaimed and nominated for five Oscars.

His novella The Pistol (1959) was drawn from his military experience, not unlike From Here to Eternity and The Thin Red Line. Around this time, he also served as technical advisor for The Longest Day (1962), a Darryl Zanuck film about the D-Day landings.

Jones did not live long enough to finish his last novel, Whistle; he knew he was dying of congestive heart failure while writing it. However, he left behind copious notes for Willie Morris to complete the final section after his death, and Whistle was published a year later, in 1978. That completed Jones's war trilogy (the first parts being From Here to Eternity and The Thin Red Line), of which he wrote: "It will say just about everything I have ever had to say, or will ever have to say, on the human condition of war and what it means to us, as against what we claim it means to us."

== Bibliography ==
=== Novels ===
- Some Came Running (1957)
- Go to the Widow-Maker (1967)
- The Merry Month of May (1971)
- A Touch of Danger (1973)

From Here to Eternity trilogy

1. From Here to Eternity (1951)
2. The Thin Red Line (1962)
3. Whistle (1978) (completed by Willie Morris)

=== Short fiction ===
The Ice-Cream Headache and Other Stories (1968) (anthology)

- The Temper of Steel
- Just Like the Girl
- The Way It Is
- Two Legs for the Two of Us
- Secondhand Man
- None Sing So Wildly
- Greater Love
- The King
- The Valentine
- A Bottle of Cream
- Sunday Allergy
- The Tennis Game
- The Ice-Cream Headache

==== To the End of the War (2011) (anthology) ====
- Over the Hill
- Night Train
- Back Home in Endymion
- Johnny Meets Sandy
- Surely Not the Red Cross
- Air Raid
- Wild Festivity in Evansville
- You Are AWOL
- Every Time I Drop an Egg...
- Stranger in a New Company
- Army Politics and Anti-Semitism
- He Was a Wop

==== Stories ====
Title	Date	Original publication	Reprinted/collected	Notes
The Pistol	1959			Novella
Two Legs for the Two of Us	Sep 1951	Esquire	Jones, James (1953). "Two legs for the two of us". In Birmingham, Frederic A. (ed.). The Girls from Esquire. London: Arthur Barker. pp. 69–77.; The Ice-Cream Headache and Other Stories (1968)	
The Temper of Steel	Mar 1948	The Atlantic	The Ice-Cream Headache and Other Stories (1968)	
The Way It Is	Jun 1949	Harper's	The Ice-Cream Headache and Other Stories (1968)	
Greater Love	Jun 1951	Collier's	The Ice-Cream Headache and Other Stories (1968)	
None Sing So Wildly	1952	New World Writing	The Ice-Cream Headache and Other Stories (1968)	
Living In A Trailer	Jul 1952	Holiday		Essay
Too Much Symbolism	May 1953	Nation		
The King	Oct 1955	Playboy	The Ice-Cream Headache and Other Stories (1968)	
Marshall, Illinois	Mar 1957	Ford Times		Essay
Just Like the Girl	Jan 1958	Playboy	The Ice-Cream Headache and Other Stories (1968)	
The Tennis Game	Jan 1958	Esquire	The Ice-Cream Headache and Other Stories (1968)	
The Valentine	Feb 1963	Saturday Evening Post	The Ice-Cream Headache and Other Stories (1968)	
Phony War Films	Mar 1963	Saturday Evening Post		Essay
Flippers! Gin! Weight Belt! Gin! Faceplate! Gin!	Jun 1963	Esquire		Essay
Letter Home: Sons of Hemingway	Dec 1963	Esquire		Essay
Letter Home	Mar 1964	Esquire		Essay
Letter Home	Dec 1964	Esquire		Essay
Why They Invade The Sea	Mar 1965	New York Times		Essay
In the Shadow of Peace	Jun 1973	New York Times		Essay
Hawaiian Recall	Feb 1974	Harper's		Essay
The Evolution of a Soldier	Sep 1975	Playboy		Essay

=== Non-fiction ===
- Viet Journal (1974)
- WW II (1975)
- WW I (1967)

== Adaptations ==
From Here to Eternity has had several adaptations, all of the same name as Jones's novel: an Academy Award–winning 1953 film adaptation and a 1979 television miniseries, which latter spawned a weekly soap opera that ran briefly in 1980, as well as a musical adaption, opened in London in 2013.

Some Came Running was adapted as a 1958 film of the same name.

The Thin Red Line was adapted as 1964 and 1998 films of the same name. (Elements of The Pistol were included in the 1964 film adaptation of The Thin Red Line.)
