= From Fear to Eternity =

From Fear to Eternity may refer to:

- From Fear to Eternity (album), a 2011 compilation album by heavy metal band Iron Maiden
- "From Fear to Eternity" (Charmed), a 1999 episode of Charmed
- "From Fear to Eternity", a 2008 episode of Eureka
- "From Fear to Eternity", a 2013 Monster High TV special
