= From Here to Eternity (miniseries) =

- VHS box art
- Written by: Harold Gast; Don McGuire; Daniel Taradash
- Directed by: Buzz Kulik
- Starring: Natalie Wood; William Devane; Kim Basinger; Steve Railsback; Joe Pantoliano
- Music by: Walter Scharf
- Country of origin: United States
- Original language: English

Production
- Executive producers: Harve Bennett; Harris Katleman
- Producer: Buzz Kulik
- Cinematography: Gerald Perry Finnerman
- Editors: Les Green; Michael B. Hoggan; Robert L. Swanson
- Running time: 6 hours
- Production company: Columbia Pictures Television

Original release
- Network: NBC
- Release: February 14 – February 28, 1979

From Here to Eternity is a 1979 American three-part, six-hour television miniseries and a remake of the 1953 film From Here to Eternity based on the 1951 novel of the same name. All three conclude with the December 7, 1941, attack on Pearl Harbor. The miniseries originally aired in three two-hour installments on three consecutive Wednesdays on NBC on February 14, 21 and 28, 1979.

The story details the men and families of G Company, 24th Infantry Division, United States Army. There are two main sub-plots: First Sergeant Milt Warden’s (William Devane) ongoing affair with Karen Holmes (Natalie Wood), the wife of his commanding officer, and Private Robert E. Lee Prewitt's (Steve Railsback) affair with Lorene Rogers (Kim Basinger), a local prostitute.

Wood won a Golden Globe Award for Best Actress in a Television Series Drama for her performance.

== Miniseries (1979) ==
=== Synopsis ===
It is April 1941 at Schofield Barracks, Hawaii and Pvt. Robert E. Lee Prewitt is new to G Company. He is a skilled boxer who unintentionally severely injured a fellow soldier in an exhibition boxing match. As a result he refuses to be a boxer anymore. This places him at odds with his company’s commanding officer, Captain Holmes, who uses the reputation of many of the sergeants in his company as skilled boxers to further his military career. Facing pressure from Gen. Barney Slater, who argues that the Army needs to control soldiers by fear of authority, Captain Holmes has many of his sergeants harass and abuse Prewitt in an attempt to pressure him to join the company's boxing team. Prewitt refuses to bend to the pressure. The company's First Sergeant, Milt Warden, attempts to help Prewitt, but there is only so much he can do.

Prewitt becomes involved with Lorene Rogers, a local prostitute. Prewitt’s friend Private Angelo Maggio is sent to the stockade after being court martialed for getting drunk and fighting with MPs. Things get worse when Pvt. Prewitt is sent to the stockade for a few months of what turns out to be brutal mistreatment at the hands of the Sergeant of the Guard at the stockade, Sgt. Fatso Judson. While in the stockade, Prewitt reunites with Maggio and finds that he has been nearly beaten to death by Judson. Maggio dies after panicking and falling out of the ambulance on his way to the hospital. After Prewitt is released from the stockade, he tracks downs Judson and kills him in a knife fight. Prewitt is wounded in the fight and he takes refuge at Lorene’s house while he heals.

Captain Holmes is promoted to major and leaves the company. The new company commander does not care about the boxing team. On December 7, 1941, the Japanese attack Pearl Harbor and Schofield Barracks. First Sergeant Warden organizes the men of his company. He and the other sergeants of the company go to the armory and get Browning Automatic Rifles (B.A.R.s) and .30 caliber Model 1919 machine guns and return fire to the attacking Japanese warplanes. Warden and his men shoot down one of the Japanese "Zeros".

Wanting to join in on the upcoming war, and with Warden promising to help smooth things over regarding Fatso’s murder if he reports back, Prewitt attempts to rejoin the company but is mortally wounded by a nervous sentry that same evening. As he lies dying, he says he knows that Sgt. Warden will take care of his body (make sure his death is marked “line of duty”) and makes sure that it gets a military burial. After he dies, Warden assures the guilt-ridden sentry that Prewitt’s death was going to happen one way or another. When asked by the other soldiers if Prewitt was a good soldier in his company, Warden replies, “Hell, he was the only soldier.”

== Weekly series (1980) ==
The miniseries spawned a weekly primetime soap opera of the same name, with many cast members reprising their roles, including William Devane, Roy Thinnes, and Kim Basinger. However Natalie Wood did not return, instead the role of Karen Holmes was played by Barbara Hershey. Gary Swanson, who played Cpl Herbert in the miniseries, replaced Steve Railsback in the role of Robert E. Lee Prewitt in flashbacks, as did Claude Jones with Peter Boyle for the role of Fatso.

The show's two-hour pilot, From Here to Eternity: Pearl Harbor, premiered on March 10, 1980. Subsequent episodes ran for an hour. After less than a month, the show was taken off the air, with the remaining episodes airing later in the year as three 130-minute specials, From Here to Eternity: Island and Homecoming, From Here to Eternity: Crossroads and Secrets and From Here to Eternity: Aftermath and Revenge. The show's finale aired on August 16, 1980.

== Cast ==
Role	Miniseries	Weekly series
Karen Holmes	Natalie Wood	Barbara Hershey
Master Sgt. Milt Warden	William Devane	William Devane
Pvt. Robert E. Lee Prewitt	Steve Railsback	Gary Swanson
Capt. Maj. Dana Holmes	Roy Thinnes	Roy Thinnes
Pvt. Angelo Maggio	Joe Pantoliano	—N/a
Lorene Rogers	Kim Basinger	Kim Basinger
"Fatso" Judson	Peter Boyle	Claude Jones
Cpl. Cheney	Will Sampson	Will Sampson
Pfc. Hanson	Rick Hurst	—N/a
Gert Kipfer	Salome Jens	Salome Jens
Sgt. Maylon Stark	Andrew Robinson	—N/a
Lt. David Ross	David Spielberg	David Spielberg
Col. Jack Delbart	Richard Venture	—N/a
Gen. Barney Slater	Andy Griffith	—N/a
Pvt. Ignacio Carmona	—N/a	Rocky Echevarria
Emily Austin	—N/a	Lacey Neuhaus
Lt. Kenneth Barrett	—N/a	John Calvin
Jefferson Davis Prewitt	—N/a	Don Johnson

== Episodes ==
Season	Episodes	Originally released	
Season	Episodes	First released	Last released
Miniseries	3	February 14, 1979	February 28, 1979
1	12	March 10, 1980	August 16, 1980

=== Miniseries (1979) ===
No.	Title	Directed by	Written by	Original release date	US viewers (millions)
1	"Part I"	Buzz Kulik	Story by : James Jones; Teleplay by : Don McGuire	February 14, 1979	21.4
2	"Part II"	Buzz Kulik	Story by : James Jones; Teleplay by : Don McGuire	February 21, 1979	14.9
3	"Part III"	Buzz Kulik	Story by : James Jones; Teleplay by : Don McGuire	February 28, 1979	20.4

=== Season 1 (1980) ===
No.	Title	Directed by	Written by	Original release date	US viewers (millions)
1	"Pearl Harbor"	Ron Satlof	Story by : Harold Gast; Teleplay by : Rudy Day & Tony Palmer	March 10, 1980	17.1
2	"Re-Enlistment Blues"	Rick Hauser	Tony Palmer	March 12, 1980	16.0
3	"Maneuvers"	James D. Parriott	Story by : Lionel E. Siegel; Teleplay by : James D. Parriott	March 19, 1980	13.0
4	"The Departure"	Jeffrey Hayden	Story by : Lionel E. Siegel; Teleplay by : Gregory S. Dinallo	March 26, 1980	12.0
5	"Images"	Rick Hauser	Tony Palmer	April 2, 1980	9.6
6	"The Island & Homecoming"	Ray Austin; Jeffrey Hayden	Story by : Lionel E. Siegel; Teleplay by : Frederic Hunter & Tony Palmer; Martha Morehead	August 3, 1980	10.3
7	"The Island & Homecoming"	Ray Austin; Jeffrey Hayden	Story by : Lionel E. Siegel; Teleplay by : Frederic Hunter & Tony Palmer; Martha Morehead	August 3, 1980	10.3
8	"Crossroads & Secrets"	Rick Hauser & Lionel E. Siegel	Story by : Lionel E. Siegel; Teleplay by : Ferde Rombola	August 4, 1980	12.7
9	"Crossroads & Secrets"	Rick Hauser & Lionel E. Siegel	Story by : Lionel E. Siegel; Teleplay by : Ferde Rombola	August 4, 1980	12.7
10	"Aftermath & Revenge"	Harry Mastrogeorge; Jeffrey Hayden	Story by : Lionel E. Siegel; Teleplay by : R. A. Urso; Allen Williams	August 5, 1980	6.4
11	"Aftermath & Revenge"	Harry Mastrogeorge; Jeffrey Hayden	Story by : Lionel E. Siegel; Teleplay by : R. A. Urso; Allen Williams	August 5, 1980	6.4
12	"Hello, Goodbye and Farewell"	Lionel E. Siegel	Tony Palmer	August 16, 1980	6.4

== Awards ==
Year	Association	Category	Nominee	Result
1980	Golden Globe Award	Best Actress – Television Series Drama	Natalie Wood	Won
