= From Here to Eternity =

1953 film directed by Fred Zinnemann

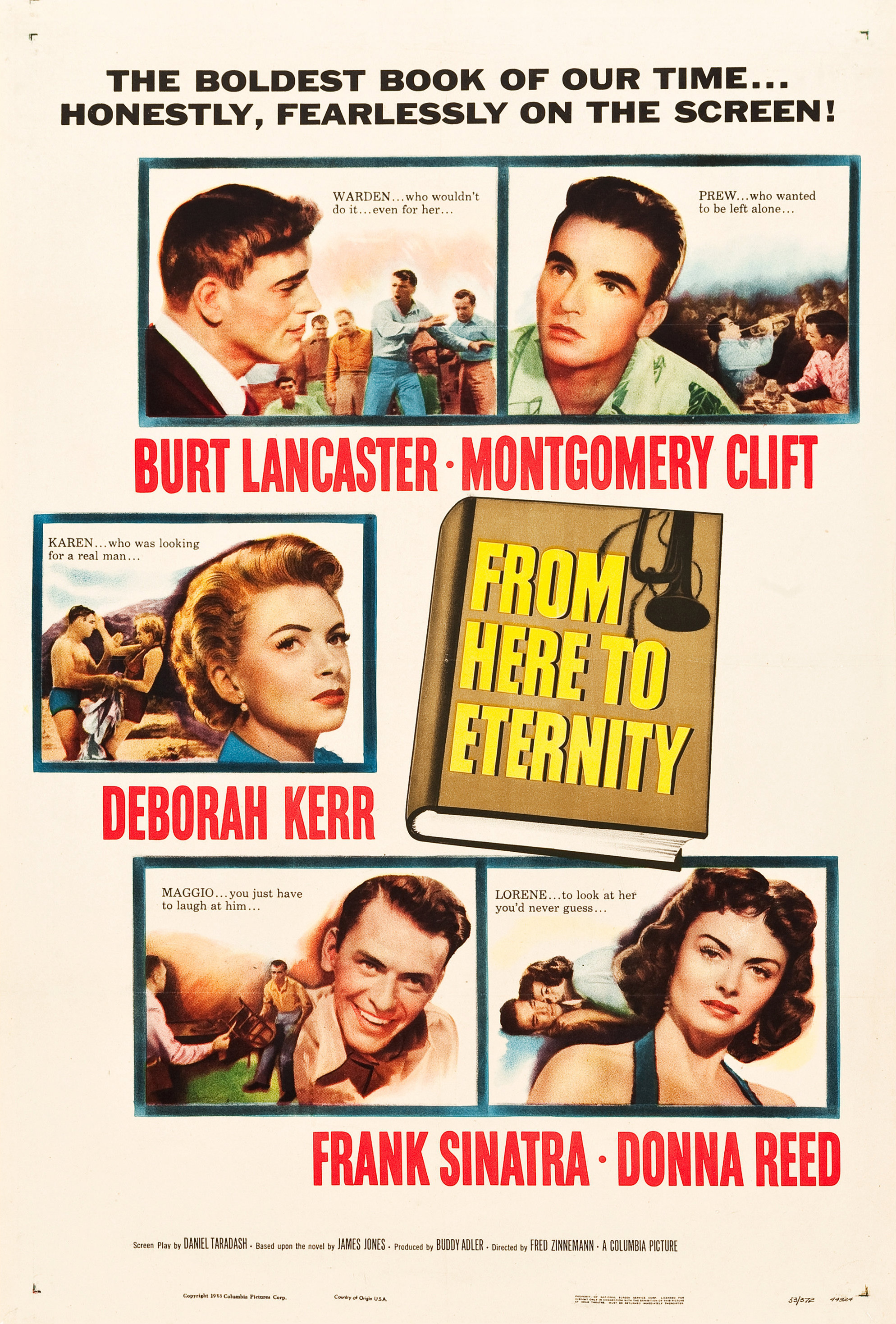
- Theatrical release poster
- Directed by: Fred Zinnemann
- Screenplay by: Daniel Taradash
- Based on: From Here to Eternity (1951 novel) by James Jones
- Produced by: Buddy Adler
- Starring: Burt Lancaster; Montgomery Clift; Deborah Kerr; Donna Reed; Frank Sinatra
- Cinematography: Burnett Guffey
- Edited by: William A. Lyon
- Music by: George Duning; Morris Stoloff
- Production company: Columbia Pictures
- Distributed by: Columbia Pictures
- Release date: August 5, 1953
- Running time: 118 minutes
- Country: United States
- Language: English
- Budget: $1.7–2.5 million
- Box office: $30.5 million

From Here to Eternity is a 1953 American romantic war drama film directed by Fred Zinnemann and written by Daniel Taradash, based on the 1951 novel by James Jones. It deals with the tribulations of three United States Army soldiers, played by Burt Lancaster, Montgomery Clift, and Frank Sinatra, stationed in Hawaii in the months leading up to the attack on Pearl Harbor. Deborah Kerr and Donna Reed portray the women in their lives. The supporting cast features Ernest Borgnine, Philip Ober, Jack Warden, Mickey Shaughnessy, Claude Akins, and George Reeves.

The film is famed for its torrid seaside scene of two of its main characters lying in the sand at the water's edge kissing in an adulterous tryst, a groundbreaking display in its time. Jones's book title originates from Rudyard Kipling's 1892 poem "Gentlemen-Rankers", about British gentlemen who had disgraced themselves or suffered financial ruin and had to enlist in "the ranks" and were "damned from here to eternity".

The film was released by Columbia Pictures on August 5, 1953, becoming a major critical and commercial success. It won 8 Academy Awards out of 13 nominations, including Best Picture, Director (Fred Zinnemann), Adapted Screenplay, Supporting Actor (Frank Sinatra), and Supporting Actress (Donna Reed). In 2002, From Here to Eternity was selected for preservation in the United States National Film Registry by the Library of Congress as being "culturally, historically, or aesthetically significant".

== Plot ==
In 1941, Private Robert E. Lee Prewitt, a bugler and career soldier who was once a professional boxer, transfers from Fort Shafter to a rifle company at Schofield Barracks on the island of Oahu. Captain Dana "Dynamite" Holmes wants him on his regimental boxing team, but Prewitt refuses absolutely. Consequently, Holmes makes Prewitt's life miserable and ultimately orders First Sergeant Milton Warden to prepare a court-martial. Warden suggests doubling Prewitt's company punishment as an alternative. Prewitt is hazed by the other NCOs and is supported only by his close friend, Private Angelo Maggio.

Prewitt and Maggio join a social club where Prewitt becomes attracted to Lorene. Prewitt confides to her he quit boxing after blinding his sparring partner. At the club, Maggio argues with stockade Sergeant "Fatso" Judson. Later, at a local bar, Judson provokes Maggio and the two nearly come to blows before Warden intervenes.

Despite being warned, Warden risks prison when he starts fraternizing with Holmes's wife, Karen. Her marriage to Holmes is unhappy and distant, made worse after Holmes's drinking and infidelity resulted in the stillbirth of her only child and consequent infertility. Karen encourages Warden to become an officer, which would enable her to divorce Holmes and marry him.

Maggio is sentenced to the stockade after walking off guard duty and getting drunk, subjecting him to Judson's unqualified (and unauthorized) wrath. Prewitt discovers Lorene's name is really Alma, and her goal is to make enough money at the club to go back to the mainland and marry. Prewitt tells her his career is in the military, and the two wonder whether they have a future together.

A member of Holmes's boxing team, Sergeant Galovitch, picks a fight with Prewitt. Holmes fails to stop it, which is noticed by the regimental commander. When Prewitt prevails in the fight, Holmes finally intervenes and is about to punish Prewitt again, but does nothing after learning Galovitch started the fight.

Maggio escapes from the stockade after a brutal beating from Judson and dies in Prewitt's arms. Seeking revenge, Prewitt engages Judson in a back alley knife fight. Prewitt kills Judson but is badly wounded and stays with Lorene. Warden covers for Prewitt's absence.

After initiating a review into Holmes's conduct, the regimental commander orders his resignation in lieu of a court martial. Holmes's replacement, Captain Ross, reprimands the other NCOs, demotes Galovitch to private, and affirms there will be no more promotions through boxing. Karen tells Warden that Holmes's resignation is forcing them back to the mainland, but Warden reveals he has no interest in becoming an officer, effectively ending their relationship. Warden promises her that they will meet somewhere someday.

On December 7, the Japanese attack Pearl Harbor. Warden takes command and leads a fierce resistance to the attack. Despite Lorene's pleas to stay with her, Prewitt attempts to rejoin his company but is shot dead by military police when he refuses to halt. Warden identifies him as a hardhead but a good soldier.

Days later, Karen and Lorene coincidentally stand next to each other on a ship going to the mainland. Karen tosses her leis into the sea, wondering if she will ever return to Hawaii. Lorene tells Karen she herself will not return, as her "fiancé", whom she identifies as Prewitt, was a bomber pilot who died during the attack and was awarded a Silver Star. Karen recognizes the name but says nothing.

== Cast ==
- Burt Lancaster as First Sergeant Milton Warden
- Montgomery Clift as Private Robert E. Lee "Prew" Prewitt
- Deborah Kerr as Karen Holmes
- Donna Reed as Alma Burke / Lorene
- Frank Sinatra as Private Angelo Maggio
- Philip Ober as Captain Dana "Dynamite" Holmes
- Mickey Shaughnessy as Corporal Leva
- Harry Bellaver as Private First Class Mazzioli
- Ernest Borgnine as Staff Sergeant James R. "Fatso" Judson
- Jack Warden as Corporal Buckley
- John Dennis as Sergeant Ike Galovitch
- Merle Travis as Private Sal Anderson
- Tim Ryan as Sergeant Pete Karelsen
- Arthur Keegan as Treadwell
- Barbara Morrison as Mrs. Kipfer

Uncredited

- George Reeves as Sergeant Maylon Stark
- Claude Akins as Sergeant "Baldy" Dhom
- Alvin Sargent as Sergeant Nair
- Robert J. Wilke as Sergeant Henderson
- Carleton Young as Colonel Ayres
- Kristine Miller as Georgette

== Production ==
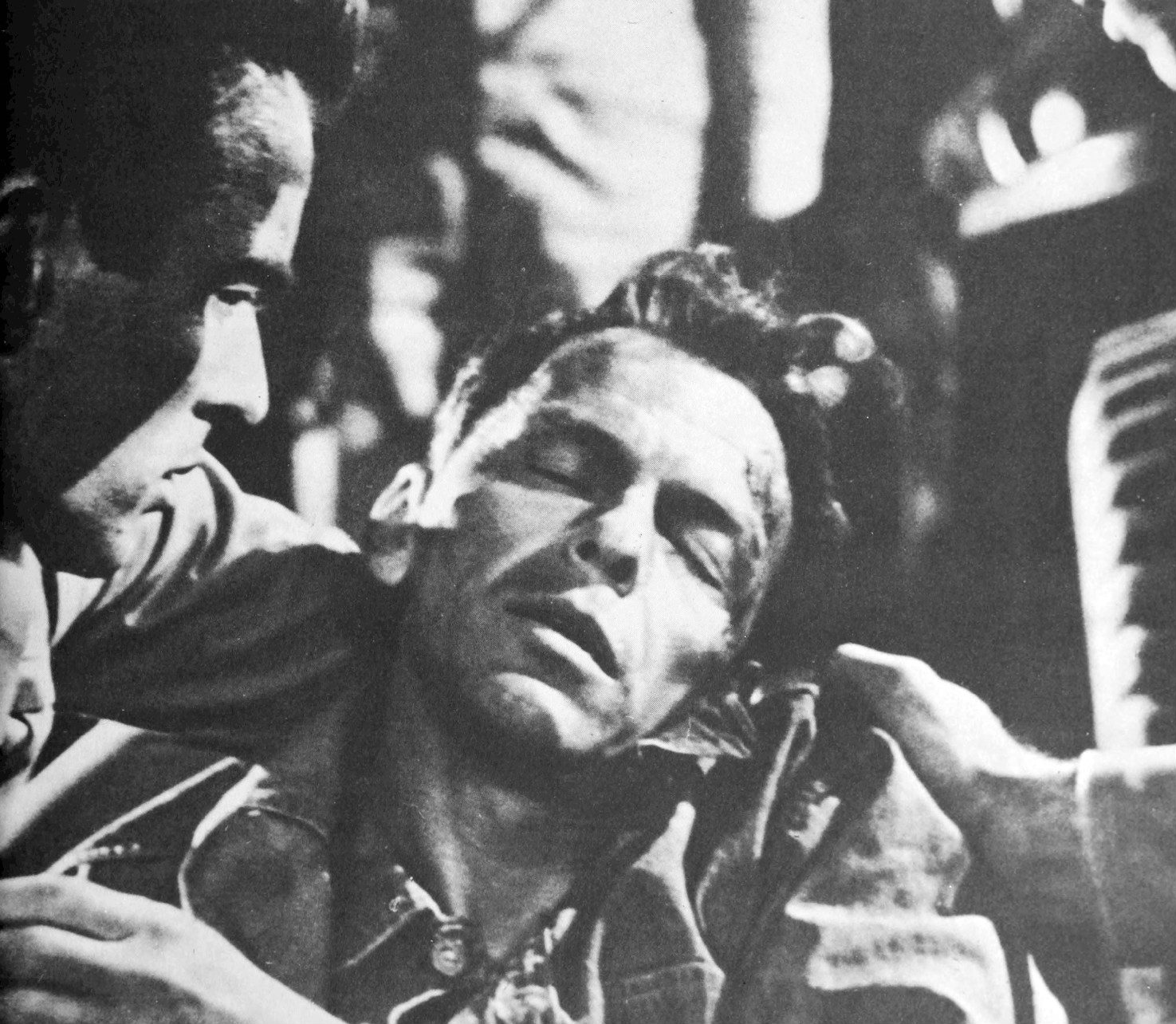
Montgomery Clift and Frank Sinatra

S. Sylvan Simon suggested to Harry Cohn that Columbia buy the rights to the novel and Simon was assigned to make the film but died from a heart attack in May 1951 before he could make preparations for the film. Author James Jones was initially hired to write the screen treatment for the film, but withdrew due to disagreements with Cohn. His early screenplay and notes are preserved at the Yale Collection of American Literature.

Hollywood legend has it that Frank Sinatra got the role in the film by means of his alleged Mafia connections, and it was the basis for a similar subplot in The Godfather. However, that has been dismissed on several occasions by the cast and crew of the film. Director Fred Zinnemann commented that "the legend about a horse's head having been cut off is pure invention, a poetic license on the part of Mario Puzo, who wrote The Godfather". One explanation of Sinatra's casting is that his then-wife Ava Gardner persuaded studio head Harry Cohn's wife to use her influence with him; this version is related by Kitty Kelley in her Sinatra biography.

Joan Crawford and Gladys George were offered roles, but George lost her role when the director decided he wanted to cast the female roles against type, and Crawford's demands to be filmed by her own cameraman led the studio to take a chance on Deborah Kerr, also playing against type.

Kim Stanley heavily campaigned for the role of Lorene, which later garnered an Academy Award for Donna Reed.

The on-screen chemistry between Lancaster and Kerr may have spilled off-screen; it was alleged that the stars became involved romantically during filming.

The songs "Re-Enlistment Blues" and "From Here to Eternity" were written by Robert Wells and Fred Karger.

In 1951, LIFE magazine reported the novel's sale price to Hollywood as $82,500.

== Differences from the novel ==
The film's trailer

Several of the novel's controversial plot points were changed or eliminated for the film to satisfy the Production Code Office and the U.S. Army. Army cooperation was necessary for the film crew to shoot on location at Schofield Barracks, use training aircraft, and obtain military footage of Pearl Harbor for use in the film, as well as for cost reasons. According to screenwriter Daniel Taradash, both the Code Office and the Army were impressed by his script, which reduced the number of censorship problems.

In the novel, Lorene was a prostitute at a brothel, but in the film, she is a hostess at a private social club. Karen's hysterectomy in the novel was caused by the unfaithful Holmes transmitting gonorrhea to her, but in the film, her hysterectomy resulted from a miscarriage, thus avoiding the topic of venereal disease. The changes were made to meet Code Office standards.

In the novel, several of the enlisted men fraternize with homosexuals, and one soldier commits suicide as a result, but homosexuality is not mentioned or directly explored in the film. Again, the change was made to satisfy the Code Office. However, J. E. Smyth has written that the film's treatment of Judson's behavior towards Maggio "has all the indications of sexual abuse, and therefore reintroduces the fear of homosexuality in the 1930s military that the rest of the script had to repress for obvious reasons of censorship".

In the novel, Captain Holmes ironically receives his desired promotion, and is transferred out of the company. In the film, Holmes is forced to resign from the Army under threat of court-martial for his ill-treatment of Prewitt. The Army insisted on this change, which the filmmakers reluctantly made. Director Zinnemann later complained that the scene where Holmes is reprimanded was "the worst moment in the film, resembling a recruiting short", and wrote, "It makes me sick every time I see it."

In the novel, Judson's systematic abuse of Maggio and other prisoners, including Prewitt at one point, is portrayed in detail. However, in the film, Maggio's abuse happens offscreen, and it is told only verbally to Prewitt, who remains free. The Army required that the abuse of Maggio not be shown and that Judson's behavior toward Maggio be portrayed as "a sadistic anomaly, and not as the result of Army policy, as depicted in Jones' book". The filmmakers agreed, seeing these changes as improvements. Maggio, who survives and is discharged in the novel, dies in the film, having been combined with two other prisoner characters from the novel (one of whom is killed by Judson in the novel) to add drama and make Maggio a stronger, more tragic figure. The Army was further appeased by the filmmakers' inclusion of a line suggesting that Maggio's death was partially caused by his falling off a truck during a prison break, rather than solely by Judson's beatings.

== Reception ==
Opening to rave reviews, From Here to Eternity proved to be an instant hit with critics and public alike, the Southern California Motion Picture Council extolling: "A motion picture so great in its starkly realistic and appealing drama that mere words cannot justly describe it."

Variety agreed:

The James Jones bestseller, From Here to Eternity, has become an outstanding motion picture in this smash screen adaptation. It is an important film from any angle, presenting socko entertainment for big business. The cast names are exceptionally good, the exploitation and word-of-mouth values are topnotch, and the prospects in all playdates are very bright, whether special key bookings or general run.

Of the actors, Variety went on to say,

Burt Lancaster, whose presence adds measurably to the marquee weight of the strong cast names, wallops the character of First Sergeant Milton Warden, the professional soldier who wet-nurses a weak, pompous commanding officer and the GIs under him. It is a performance to which he gives depth of character as well as the muscles which had gained marquee importance for his name. Montgomery Clift, with a reputation for sensitive, three-dimensional performances, adds another to his growing list as the independent GI who refuses to join the company boxing team, taking instead the 'treatment' dished out at the C.O.'s instructions. Frank Sinatra scores a decided hit as Angelo Maggio, a violent, likeable Italo-American GI. While some may be amazed at this expression of the Sinatra talent versatility, it will come as no surprise to those who remember the few times he has had a chance to be something other than a crooner in films.

The New York Post applauded Frank Sinatra, remarking, "He proves he is an actor by playing the luckless Maggio with a kind of doomed gaiety that is both real and immensely touching." Newsweek also stated that, "Frank Sinatra, a crooner long since turned actor, knew what he was doing when he plugged for the role of Maggio." John McCarten of The New Yorker concurred, writing that the film "reveals that Frank Sinatra, in the part of Mr. Clift's best friend who winds up in the stockade, is a first-rate actor."

The cast agreed; Burt Lancaster commented in the book Sinatra: An American Legend that, "[Sinatra's] fervour, his bitterness had something to do with the character of Maggio, but also with what he had gone through the last number of years. A sense of defeat and the whole world crashing in on him... They all came out in that performance."

Despite the rivalry between their respective characters, Sinatra and Borgnine, both from Italian roots, became lifelong friends. They corresponded with each other at Christmas season by exchanging cards signed using their film characters' names, "Maggio" and "Fatso". At a Dean Martin Celebrity Roast honoring Sinatra, Borgnine mockingly reprised his Fatso Judson character.

The film was number one in the United States for four weeks during September 1953, with a gross of $2,087,000. With a final gross of $30.5 million equating to earnings of $12.2 million, From Here to Eternity not only became one of the highest-grossing films of 1953, but also one of the ten highest-grossing films of the decade. Adjusted for inflation, its box office gross would exceed US$277 million in 2017 dollars.

Despite the positive response of the critics and public, the Army was reportedly not pleased with its depiction in the finished film, and refused to let its name be used in the opening credits. The Navy banned the film from being shown to its servicemen on its ships or Naval shore installations, calling it "derogatory of a sister service" and a "discredit to the armed services", although the Army and Air Force Motion Picture services purchased the film for screenings.

On Rotten Tomatoes, the film holds a score of 88% from 100 reviews, with an average rating of 8.3/10. The website's critics consensus reads, "It has perhaps aged poorly, but this languidly paced WWII romance remains an iconic, well-acted film, featuring particularly strong performances from Burt Lancaster and Montgomery Clift." On Metacritic, the film holds a weighted average score of 85 out of 100 based on 21 critics, indicating "universal acclaim".

== Awards and nominations ==
William Holden, who won the Academy Award for Best Actor for Stalag 17, felt that Lancaster or Clift should have won. Sinatra later said that he thought his performance of heroin addict Frankie Machine in The Man with the Golden Arm was more deserving of an Oscar than his role as Maggio.

Award	Category	Nominee(s)	Result	Ref.
Academy Awards	Best Picture	Buddy Adler	Won	
Academy Awards	Best Director	Fred Zinnemann	Won	
Academy Awards	Best Actor	Montgomery Clift	Nominated	
Academy Awards	Best Actor	Burt Lancaster	Nominated	
Academy Awards	Best Actress	Deborah Kerr	Nominated	
Academy Awards	Best Supporting Actor	Frank Sinatra	Won	
Academy Awards	Best Supporting Actress	Donna Reed	Won	
Academy Awards	Best Screenplay	Daniel Taradash	Won	
Academy Awards	Best Cinematography – Black-and-White	Burnett Guffey	Won	
Academy Awards	Best Costume Design – Black-and-White	Jean Louis	Nominated	
Academy Awards	Best Film Editing	William Lyon	Won	
Academy Awards	Best Music Score of a Dramatic or Comedy Picture	George Duning and Morris Stoloff	Nominated	
Academy Awards	Best Sound Recording	John P. Livadary	Won	
Bambi Awards	Best Film – International		Won	
British Academy Film Awards	Best Film		Nominated	
Cannes Film Festival	Grand Prix	Fred Zinnemann	Nominated	
Directors Guild of America Awards	Outstanding Directorial Achievement in Motion Pictures	Fred Zinnemann	Won	
Golden Globe Awards	Best Supporting Actor – Motion Picture	Frank Sinatra	Won	
Golden Globe Awards	Best Director – Motion Picture	Fred Zinneman	Won	
Golden Screen Awards	Golden Screen		Won	
Golden Screen Awards	Golden Screen with Star		Won	
National Board of Review Awards	Top Ten Films		3rd Place	
National Film Preservation Board	National Film Registry		Inducted	
New York Film Critics Circle Awards	Best Film		Won	
New York Film Critics Circle Awards	Best Director	Fred Zinneman	Won	
New York Film Critics Circle Awards	Best Actor	Burt Lancaster	Won	
Online Film & Television Association Awards	Film Hall of Fame: Productions		Inducted	
Photoplay Awards	Gold Medal		Won	
Writers Guild of America Awards	Best Written American Drama	Daniel Taradash	Won	

=== American Film Institute ===
- AFI's 100 Years...100 Movies: #52
- AFI's 100 Years...100 Passions: #20

== Television ==
An unsuccessful television pilot starring Darren McGavin as 1st Sgt. Warden, Roger Davis as Pvt. Prewitt, and Tom Nardini as Pvt. Maggio was made in 1966.

In 1979, William Devane starred as 1st Sgt. Warden in a miniseries that became a television series in 1980.
