= From Here to Eternity (novel) =

1951 novel by James Jones

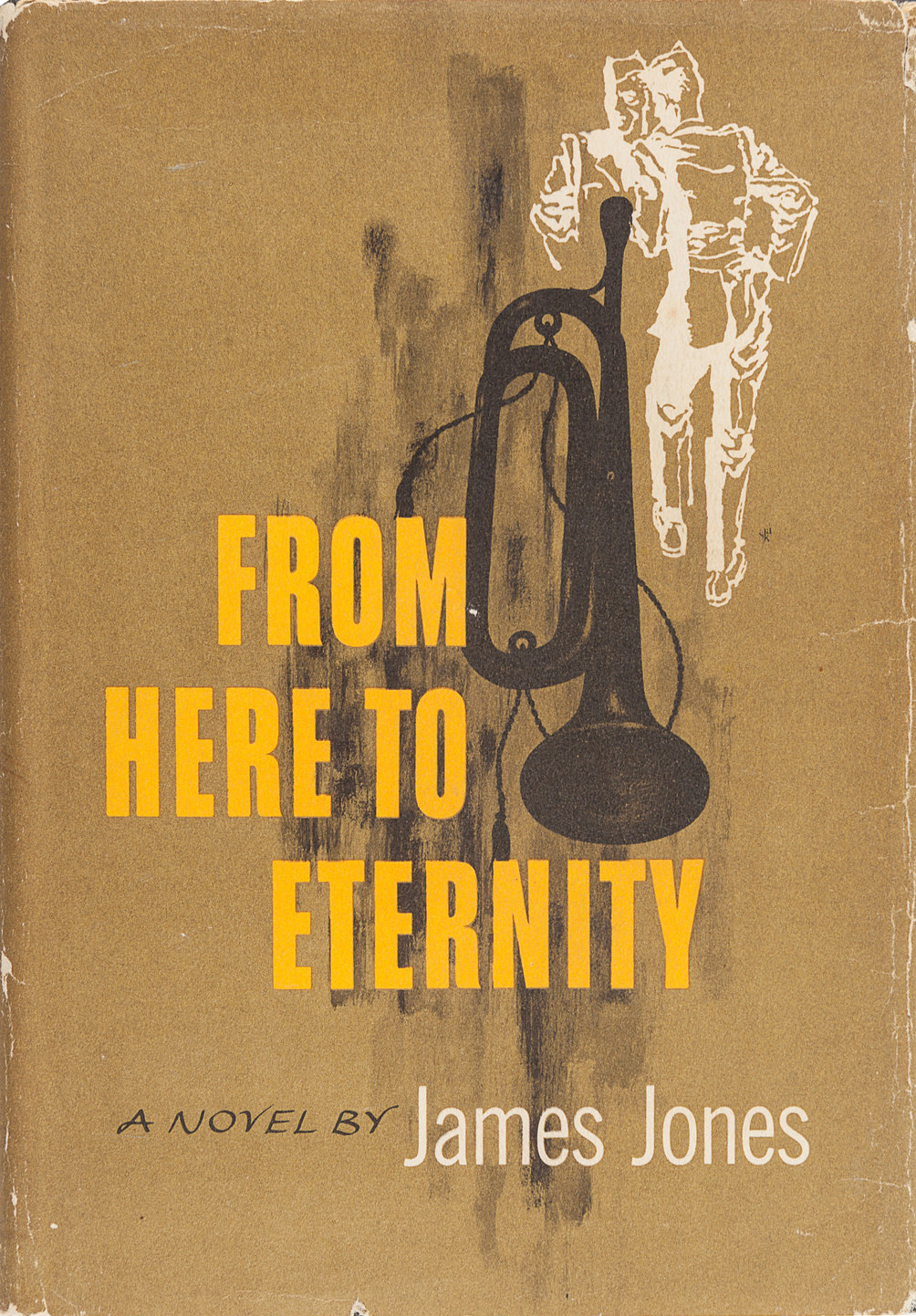
- First edition
- Author: James Jones
- Language: English
- Genre: War novel
- Publisher: Charles Scribner's Sons
- Publication date: February 26, 1951
- Publication place: United States
- Media type: Print (hardback & paperback)
- Pages: 861 (first edition, hard), 865 (Restored edition)

From Here to Eternity is the debut novel of American author James Jones, published by Scribner's in 1951. Set in 1941, the novel focuses on several members of a U.S. Army infantry company stationed in Hawaii in the months leading up to the Japanese attack on Pearl Harbor.

It is loosely based on Jones's experiences in the pre–World War II Hawaiian Division's 27th Infantry and the unit in which he served, Company E ("The Boxing Company"). Fellow company member Hal Gould said that while the novel was based on the company, including some depictions of actual persons, the characters are fictional, and the harsh conditions and described events are inventions. Other company members who served with Jones said that "The book 'From Here to Eternity' is 80 percent true" or ninety percent true. After viewing the 1953 film adaptation, company member Joseph A. Maggio sued Jones and his publishers and Columbia Pictures, claiming his character had been defamed. Robert Lee Stewart, on whom the character Robert E. Lee Prewitt is based, complained of his dislike of Jones's novel after reading it: "I was unhappy for the simple reason I felt it was an invasion of my privacy. I would never have done it to him – he was my friend." Stewart decided against filing a lawsuit because he valued the camaraderie he and Jones had developed while serving in the Army.

From Here to Eternity won the National Book Award and was named one of the 100 Best Novels of the 20th century by the Modern Library Board. The book was later made into an Academy Award–winning film starring Burt Lancaster, Montgomery Clift, Deborah Kerr, Donna Reed, Frank Sinatra, and Ernest Borgnine as well as two television adaptations and a stage musical.

== Plot ==
In February 1941, Private Robert E. Lee Prewitt, nicknamed "Prew", reports to his new posting at G Company, a US Army infantry unit stationed at Schofield Barracks in Hawaii. Prew is a career soldier (a "thirty-year man") with six years' service and is a talented bugler. He was transferred from his last unit, a Bugle Corps, with a reduction to the lowest rank after complaining that a less skilled bugler, who was a sex partner of the Chief Bugler, had been made First Bugler over him.

G Company's commanding officer is Captain Dana "Dynamite" Holmes, the regimental boxing coach, who chose Prew for his unit because of Prew's past history as a talented welterweight boxer. Holmes thinks that winning a boxing championship will help his chances for promotion and concentrates on building a strong team, offering incentives such as promotions to men who box well. However, Prew swore off boxing after accidentally blinding his sparring partner and even transferred out of a past regiment to get away from boxing. Prew refuses to box for Holmes' team, resulting in his being given "The Treatment" by his platoon guide Sergeant Galovitch and others. "The Treatment" is a daily hazing ritual in which Prew is constantly singled out for extra drill exercises, unwarranted punishments, and undesirable work assignments in hopes of breaking him down through exhaustion. Despite the abuse, Prew refuses to change his mind about boxing.

Holmes' First Sergeant Milt Warden is a career soldier, who, as the ranking non-commissioned officer, does most of the work of running the company while Captain Holmes is off pursuing either his promotion or women. Warden is both efficient at his job and understanding with the men under him. He comes to respect Prew, and at one point even stays out late getting drunk with him and then makes sure he gets home safely without being disciplined. Warden has also heard that Holmes' wife, Karen, has slept with various other men in his unit and begins an affair with her himself. Warden finds out that Karen's promiscuous behavior is due to her husband's cheating and giving her gonorrhea years after their marriage, forcing her to have a hysterectomy as part of the cure. Karen and Warden fall in love, and Warden continues to see her in secret despite the risk to his career and a possible military prison sentence at Leavenworth if Holmes finds out. Holmes realizes that his wife is having an affair but does not suspect that it is with Warden. Karen wants Warden to take a training course to become an officer so she can marry him and divorce Holmes. Warden feels this would be improper on top of his already mixed feelings about officers.

Due to lesser pay and lack of perspectives for their relationship, Prew has given up on his local girlfried Violet, who was of Japanese-Hawaiian descent. At a brothel catering to servicemen, Prew meets Lorene, a White American prostitute whose real name is actually Alma Schmidt. Lorene plans to save the money she makes and use it to establish herself in respectable society back in her Oregon hometown and eventually marry a man who is so respectable that no one would ever believe she had been a prostitute. She and Prew fall in love, but she refuses to marry him because she does not think he is respectable enough.

Prew has befriended a new young soldier, Private Angelo Maggio, whose impetuous behavior sometimes gets him into trouble. Returning from a drunken night on the town, Prew and Maggio encounter military policemen (MPs), and Maggio fights them. As a result, Maggio is sentenced to a term in the stockade, the local military prison.

Before the company's big boxing match, Prew gets into a fight with Private first class Isaac Bloom, one of the boxers, and beats him so badly there is a concern that Bloom can no longer box. However, Bloom boxes and wins his match with a quick knockout. Later, Sergeant Galovitch attacks Prew with a knife while Prew is unarmed. Prew knocks out Sergeant Galovitch but refuses to testify that Galovitch had a knife; as a result, Prew is sentenced to three months in the stockade. While Prew is in the stockade, Bloom, a closet homosexual, commits suicide.

In the stockade, Prew sees prisoners routinely beaten and abused by Staff Sergeant "Fatso" Judson, the prison second-in-command. Prew reconnects with Maggio, who is in the "Number Two" barracks where the most recalcitrant prisoners are kept. Maggio has undergone repeated beatings and solitary confinement in the prison and is now hardened as a result. Prew schemes to be transferred into Number Two by committing an infraction and then being beaten and then spending time in the "Black Hole", a dark solitary confinement cell where prisoners are fed minimal bread and water rations. After coming out, he is placed in Number Two and forms a camaraderie with the other prisoners there. Maggio schemes to get out of the prison and out of the Army altogether by pretending to have gone crazy. He is repeatedly beaten for days by Judson, who suspects that he is faking and tries to get him to admit it, to no avail. Meanwhile, Maggio manages to get a message back to his friends that he is all right. Maggio is given a Section 8 dishonorable discharge, and Prew never sees him again.

Judson interrogates one of the other Number Two prisoners, Blues Berry, and ends up torturing and beating Berry to death in front of his Number Two barracks mates including Prew. Prew vows to kill Judson when he himself is released. Prew is later released and returns to Company G, which is changed. Holmes received a promotion and left the company, and Galovitch was reduced in rank after the knife fight incident. Days later, Prew goes into town, finds Judson, challenges him to a knife fight and kills him, but Prew sustains severe injuries. He goes AWOL to Alma's house to recover and stays there after he is well even though his relationship with Alma is deteriorating. Prew no longer wishes to make the Army his career but has no other ideas about what he might do, and Alma is making plans to return to Oregon without him. Prew is afraid of imprisonment for killing Judson, but during a clandestine meeting with Warden, he finds out he has not been suspected in the killing. However, Warden tells Prew he might have to serve a month in the Stockade for the time he spent AWOL, causing Prew to go back into hiding at Alma's to avoid returning to the stockade.

The Japanese attack Pearl Harbor although most of the damage is done at the harbor and Hickam Field rather than the Schofield Barracks. Prew decides he must return to his unit and says goodbye to Alma forever. On the way back, he is stopped by guards and because he has no identification, they begin to arrest him. Not wanting to go back to the stockade, he runs and is shot dead. Warden comes to identify him and collect his personal effects.

Warden bids a farewell to Karen since he will be involved in combat in World War II, and she is returning to the mainland United States. On the ship leaving Hawaii, Karen meets a girl who says that she was an executive secretary on the island and that her fiancé, named Robert E. Lee Prewitt and from "an old Virginia family", was a bomber pilot killed in the attack on Hickam Field who posthumously received the Silver Star. Karen, told by Warden about Prew, realizes that the girl is the former prostitute, Lorene.

== Main characters ==
- Private Robert E. Lee "Prew" Prewitt – A career soldier with six years' service at 23. After the disintegration of his poor mining family in Kentucky, he was a teenage hobo during the Great Depression before enlisting in the US Army at 17. In the Army, he learned to box and play the bugle.
- First Sergeant Milton Anthony "Milt" Warden – At 34, he has already served in several different countries and is an efficient administrator who takes care of the day-to-day operations of G Company. He is tough but fair and understanding with his enlisted men. He is skeptical about the abilities of commissioned officers. He has an affair with Karen Holmes and falls in love with her.
- Captain Dana "Dynamite" Holmes – The commanding officer of G Company and regimental boxing coach, he hopes to get a promotion and so pushes his men to perform well in boxing and spends time ingratiating himself with his superiors. He leaves Warden to do the actual work of running the company. He is married to Karen but cheats on her and neglects her. He is eventually promoted to Major and transferred out of G Company.
- Karen Holmes – Captain Holmes' beautiful wife, who was forced to have a hysterectomy as treatment for gonorrhea she got from her husband. As a result, her marriage is strained, and she has affairs, including with Stark and Warden with whom she falls in love.
- Lorene/ Alma Schmidt – A beautiful prostitute who came to Hawaii from Oregon, having turned to prostitution after her rich hometown boyfriend dumped her and married someone of a higher social class. She plans to make enough money in Hawaii to establish herself in a higher social class back home and eventually marry a man of impeccable reputation so that no one would ever suspect she had been a prostitute. She falls in love with Prew but will not marry him because of his low social status.
- Private Angelo Maggio – A young, hotheaded and outspoken Italian new recruit, originally from Brooklyn, who becomes Prew's good friend. To supplement his paycheck, he is a paid companion (and sometimes partner in the restored version of the novel) to homosexuals although he appears to be heterosexual. He fights with military police while drunk and is sentenced to the Stockade, where he endures beatings and abuse by "Fatso" Judson before finally getting a Section 8 discharge.
- Private First Class Isaac Bloom – A Jewish infantryman who, unlike Prewitt, joins Captain Holmes' boxing team in hopes of advancing his military career. He gets into fights with both Maggio and Prewitt, and feels that people dislike him for being Jewish, among other things. Later, he is promoted to corporal, but when he is sent to noncommissioned officer training school, he gets kicked out. He secretly fears that he is homosexual and ends up committing suicide.
- Mess Sergeant Maylon Stark – The company's head cook, he was previously with Capt. Holmes' troop at Fort Bliss, where he had an affair with Karen Holmes. A contradiction occurs in the storyline when Stark and Prew travel to the New Congress hotel and Stark is greeted by the Madam, Mrs Kipfer, as an old acquaintance/client when this is the first time Stark has been off post since his transfer from Fort Bliss.
- Sergeant/ Platoon Guide "Old Ike" Galovitch – An older soldier of Yugoslav background who gives Prew "The Treatment" when he refuses to box. He attacks Prew with a knife, causing Prew to fight back with his fists and then be sentenced to the Stockade.
- Staff Sergeant James "Fatso" Judson – The sadistic second-in-command of the Stockade, Judson beats and tortures prisoners for minor infractions or insubordination and kills Blues Berry. Judson is later killed by Prew.
- Jack Malloy – A charismatic prisoner in the Stockade, who was previously a labor organizer and seaman. He eventually escapes and is suspected of killing Judson.
- Blues Berry – Prew and Maggio's friend and fellow prisoner in the Stockade, who is tortured to death by Judson.

== Title ==
The title was inspired indirectly by a line from Rudyard Kipling's poem "Gentleman Rankers:"

"Gentlemen-rankers out on a spree,
Damned from here to Eternity,
God ha' mercy on such as we,
Baa! Yah! Bah!"

The phrase "from here to eternity" was incorporated into "The Whiffenpoof Song", trademark song of an a cappella ensemble at Yale University, and it was this usage that directly inspired Jones, as he informed his editor Maxwell Perkins.

== Context ==
Three of the central characters are essentially similar in all three of Jones' World War II novels, but their names are altered. From Here to Eternity features First Sergeant Milton Warden, Private Robert Prewitt, and Mess Sergeant Maylon Stark. The Thin Red Line (1962), features similar characters named First Sergeant Edward Welsh, Private Robert Witt, and Mess Sergeant Maynard Storm. In Whistle (1978), analogous characters again reappear named Sergeant Mart Winch, Bobby Prell, and Johnny "Mother" Strange.

== Late cuts ==
In 2009, the author's daughter, Kaylie Jones, revealed that her father had been compelled to make a number of pre-publication cuts, removing some expletives and some gay sex passages. A new edition of the book with the previously censored passages restored was published by Open Road as an e-book in May 2011. It was subsequently released in print in 2013 by Penguin as part of its Modern Classics Collection.

== Reception ==
From Here to Eternity won the third annual U.S. National Book Award in 1952.

Up to the release of the film in August 1953, the book had sold 400,000 copies and was selling an average of 500 copies a month. After the release of the film, sales increased to 4,000 copies a week. As the film toned down the strong language used in the book, it was suggested that sales may have been partly influenced by people wanting to find out "what words James used."

The novel is number 62 on the Modern Library 100 Best Novels list.

Joan Didion was a great admirer of From Here to Eternity and discussed its role in shaping her perceptions of Hawaii in her essay "In the Islands", included in her 1979 book The White Album.

== Adaptations ==
=== Television and film ===
From Here to Eternity was adapted as a film of the same name in 1953, directed by Fred Zinnemann and produced by Buddy Adler, which won eight Oscars, including Best Picture.

It was adapted twice for television as a miniseries of the same name in 1979 and as a series of the same name in 1980.

=== Stage ===
A musical adaption of the novel opened at the Shaftesbury Theatre in London in October 2013.
