= Handy Writers' Colony =

The Handy Writers' Colony, often called simply the Handy Colony or The Colony, was a writers' colony located in Marshall, Illinois, which operated from 1950 to 1964. The Handy Colony was founded in 1950 by Lowney Turner Handy and her husband, Harry Handy, along with Lowney's student (and then-lover), best-selling novelist James Jones. Lowney Handy was the Colony's quirky teacher and mentor, with financial support coming from her husband and Jones, particularly after the sale of Jones' first novel, From Here to Eternity. A unique aspect of Handy's approach was to have her students spend many hours simply copying, by hand or typewriter, materials from authors whose work she admired.

Handy was vehemently opposed to homosexual writers, often making homophobic and derogatory remarks about artists such as Walt Whitman, Marcel Proust, and Hart Crane, as well as D. H. Lawrence and T. S. Eliot, which she had banned her students from reading (along with the works of Wallace Stevens, Franz Kafka, and Dylan Thomas, among others), even going so far as to tear up books and physically assault students.

Originally conceived as a Utopian commune where budding artists could focus exclusively on their writing projects, the colony dissolved largely because of Handy's own erratic behavior and Jones' focus on his own novels. Jones' editor and mentor, Burroughs Mitchell, said of Handy:

She could be charming, easy, and warm; but her black eyes could quickly become blacker, her voice strident, with a violent outburst. Lowney was convinced she could do anything. She held various mystical beliefs, drawn from dubious books on Eastern thought (and some of this unfortunately affected Jim in Some Came Running). In Jim Jones, dedication to the art of writing was an essential part of a steadfast nature. In Lowney, that dedication was an obsession, a madness. She had read quite widely, but unevenly. For example, she admired Arnold Bennett, but thought Dickens wrote stories for boys. She became a torment to Jim and ultimately went mad and committed suicide. But it has to be remembered that she gave him support and encouragement at the beginning of his career, when he was otherwise alone.

Despite Handy's policy prohibiting outsiders from entering the colony, certain visitors were allowed, including Burroughs Mitchell, Norman Mailer, and actor Montgomery Clift.

Many young writers found support at the Colony. Published writers associated with the Colony included James Jones, John Bowers, Tom T. Chamales, Edwin C. Daly, William Duhart, Jere Peacock, Jon Shirota, Jerry Tschappat (a.k.a. Gerald Tesch), and Charles S. Wright. The colony dissolved with the death of Lowney Handy in 1964.

== Novels associated with the Colony ==
Published novels written at least in part at the Colony or with editorial advice from Lowney Handy include:

- John Bowers:
  - The Colony (New York: E. P. Dutton, 1971) — slightly fictionalized account of Bowers' time at the Colony
- Tom T. Chamales:
  - Never So Few (New York: Scribner's, 1957)
  - Go Naked in the World (New York: Scribner's, 1959)
- Edwin C. Daly:
  - Some Must Watch (New York: Scribner's, 1956)
  - A Legacy of Love (New York: Scribner's 1958)
- William Duhart:
  - The Deadly Pay-Off (Greenwich, CT: Gold Medal Books, 1958)
- James Jones:
  - From Here to Eternity (New York: Scribner's, 1951)
  - Some Came Running (New York: Scribner's 1958)
- Jere Peacock:
  - Valhalla (New York: G. P. Putnam's Sons, 1961)
- Jon Shirota:
  - Lucky Come Hawaii (New York: Bantam Books, 1965)
- Gerald Tesch:
  - Never the Same Again (New York: G. P. Putnam's Sons, 1956)
- Charles Wright:
  - The Messenger (New York: Farrar, Straus, 1963)

== Archives ==
The archives of the Handy Colony are in Archives/Special Collections in Norris L. Brookens Library at the University of Illinois Springfield. In addition, the Department of Special Collections at Cunningham Memorial Library at Indiana State University holds the Colony's library, including books by Handy's students and the books from which she had them copy.
