= Tom T. Chamales =

American novelist (1924–1960)

Thomas Theodore Chamales Jr
- Born: August 8, 1924; Chicago, Illinois, United States
- Died: March 20, 1960 (aged 35); Beverly Hills, California, United States
- Occupation: Novelist
- Spouse(s): Constance Chamales (m. 1945; div. 1957) Helen O'Connell (m. 1957)
- Children: 3
- Military career
- Allegiance: United States
- Branch: United States Army
- Service years: 1942-45
- Rank: Captain
- Unit: Merrill's Marauders
- Conflicts: World War II
- Awards: Bronze Star Medal; Purple Heart Medal

Thomas Theodore Chamales Jr (born Theodore Chamales; August 8, 1924 – March 20, 1960) was an American author and veteran of Merrill's Marauders and the Office of Strategic Services.

== Early life ==
Chamales was the son of Helene and Thomas Chamales Sr, a Chicago real estate developer and owner of the Delaware Hotel in Muncie, Indiana who purchased the Green Mill Cocktail Lounge in Chicago in 1910. Thomas Jr attended St. John's Northwestern Military Academy in Delafield, Wisconsin and graduated in 1942.

== Military career ==
During World War II Chamales enlisted in the United States Army when he was 18 years old. He was commissioned a Second Lieutenant at Fort Benning, Georgia and was assigned to train troops at Camp Wheeler, Georgia. He volunteered for service in North Africa then was transferred to India. Chamales volunteered to serve in the Long Range Penetration unit known as Merrill's Marauders where he was wounded by shrapnel from a Japanese hand grenade.

He then volunteered for OSS Detachment 101 where he parachuted into Lashio, Burma. He trained and led the 3rd Battalion Kachin Rangers that had a strength of 900 men as one of the youngest Captains in the US Army. He was awarded the Bronze Star Medal and Purple Heart Medal. During this service he witnessed a controversial incident involving Chinese guerrillas robbing and murdering American soldiers. The incident was the subject of his first novel Never So Few (1957) that was filmed in 1959 by MGM. Chamales also wrote his account of the true incident in an article for True Magazine in June 1958 entitled Betrayal in China where Chamales described the incident, dealings with the Nationalist Chinese military, and the execution of the Chinese responsible.

He was discharged from the Army in December 1945.

== Writing career ==
Following the war Chamales married his first wife Constance with whom he had two children, Thomas and Gerald. He worked in the hotel industry in the Commercial Hotel in Yakima, Washington which his father had purchased, but Chamales desired to be a writer. He was befriended by James Jones in the Handy Writers' Colony in Marshall, Illinois. Lowney Turner Handy, the founder of the school said he was the only student she ever had who could turn out almost perfect entire chapters where she'd have to do very little editing. As soon as Chamales wrote it, his work was ready to go to the publisher.

His first novel Never So Few based on his war experiences was published in 1957 with MGM obtaining the film rights for the novel in November 1956. According to Lowney Turner Handy, MGM paid US$300,000 for the film rights, four times the price of James Jones' From Here to Eternity.

Chamales divorced his first wife Constance in 1957 in a Mexican divorce and married singer Helen O'Connell less than a month after Helen and Tom met each other. The two had a daughter, Helen Maria Chamales.

In 1959 Chamales published his second novel about the struggles of a World War II veteran, son of a wealthy Greek immigrant. Whilst still in the galley proof stage, MGM changed the title from No Rent in His Hand to the more lurid Go Naked in the World. The property was filmed by MGM in 1961 also starred Gina Lollobrigida with Tony Franciosa.

== Death ==
Shortly after returning from a visit with Ernest Hemingway, Chamales died in an apartment fire caused by a cigarette setting off a divan with Chamales asphyxiated by the fumes. On the day of his death, he was due to appear in court on domestic violence charges.

== Alleged unfinished works ==
After Chamales' death a publisher and Helen O' Connell announced a third Chamales novel Forget I Ever Lived but Lowney Handy was adamant that there was no book; Chamales had only written three pages in a book about two characters based on James Jones and Chamales going to New York City.

Other accounts state Chamales wrote a play titled, "Forget I Ever Lived"; an outline for screenplay, "The Mill" (possibly about his father's Chicago Green Mill Cocktail Lounge), and 550 pages of an unfinished novel titled "Run and Call It Living."
