= Maggie Pierce (actress) =

American actress (1931–2010)

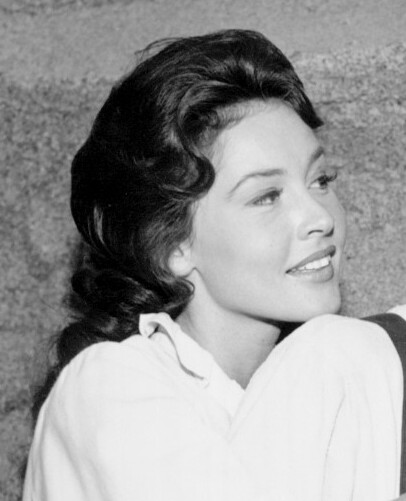
- Pierce in Wagon Train, 1962
- Born: Margaret P. L. Pierce; October 24, 1931; Detroit, Michigan, U.S.
- Died: April 5, 2010 (aged 78); Danbury, Connecticut, U.S.
- Other name: Maggie Minskoff
- Education: New York University School of Nursing
- Occupations: Nurse; model; actress; producer
- Years active: 1951–1984
- Known for: My Mother the Car; Tales of Terror; The Fastest Guitar Alive; Wagon Train
- Spouse: Jerry Minskoff (m. 1971; died 1994)

Margaret P. L. Pierce (October 24, 1931 – April 5, 2010) was an American nurse and model who then became a film and television actress. A former MGM contract player, she had a starring role on the 1965-1966 television series My Mother the Car.

== Early life ==
She was born Margaret P. L. Pierce in Detroit, Michigan. Her parents were Robert Lloyd Pierce, a chartered accountant in his native Manchester and CPA in his adopted homeland, and Nellie Young, a former typist, also from Manchester, UK. Pierce was the third of four children and the only daughter for the couple.

Pierce's father immigrated to the US in 1921, eventually becoming a naturalized citizen. Her mother came to the US later and the couple married in Michigan in 1923. Pierce's father was a corporate officer for the Briggs Manufacturing Company in Detroit, while the family lived in the northern suburb of Southfield, Michigan. According to an interview from 1965, as a little girl, Pierce had her own bedroom with one wall paneled in mirrors.

She used to sit on her bed and make faces at her reflection by the hour. When the practice persisted, her father told her one day, "Young lady, you had better start spending your time a little more wisely. You'll never earn a living making faces." Says Maggie, "Guess I showed him."

When she was ten years old, her mother died of colorectal cancer in March 1942. Her father remarried five months later to a teacher named Josephine Bordeaux. A few months after that, Pierce's older brother David, who was afflicted with spina bifida, died of pneumonia. The two bereavements, coming so close together, influenced her choice for an initial career.

Her father and step-mother enrolled her at Milwaukee-Downer girl's high school for the start of her secondary education. The move to put her in a Milwaukee boarding school came as a surprise, she told interviewer Jerry Pam many years later, but "after a few weeks I really dug it". She later returned to Michigan to attend Brookside Academy, a progressive girls school, where she claimed to have "majored in oil painting, ceramics, dramatics, and soccer".

== Nursing and modeling ==
After graduating from high school, Pierce went to New York in 1949 and enrolled at the New York University School of Nursing. (Note: Pierce would cite either NYU or Bellevue in different interviews as to where she received her nurses training. The former is more likely for an RN as opposed to a practical nurse.) She became a registered nurse two years later, and was hired by Bellevue Hospital, where she was assigned to the pediatric wards. The children called her "Pretty Miss Pierce" and would pull out their crayons to try and draw pictures of her when she made her rounds.

A doctor at Bellevue, noting Pierce's increasing dejection at losing patients, suggested she take up modeling and referred her to Eileen Ford at the Ford Modeling Agency, who hired her. She continued to be a nurse while also modeling for photographers and illustrators. She was a particular favorite of Jon Whitcomb for magazine covers, appearing on Seventeen and Mademoiselle. In March 1955 she was the subject of a newspaper article and photoshoot about her dual careers. When asked which career she preferred, she demurred, replying she got a "different kind of satisfaction from each".

Pierce resigned her position at Bellevue to take part in an extended publicity campaign for the title of Miss Rheingold. This commercial beauty contest lasted from August through September 1955. It featured six finalists chosen from 1500 initial contestants, whom the general public could vote for at various venues around the country. One of the other finalists was an athletic young actress from Maine named Myrna Fahey. Pierce and Fahey bore a strong resemblance to each other, enough that they were later cast as sisters on a television show. Though neither won the Miss Rheingold title, they both received a lot of national publicity from personal appearances and newspaper photos.

== MGM contract player ==
Pierce made her television debut on The Tonight Show on January 25, 1957. The show was based out of New York City at that time, and her status as model, local nurse, and Miss Rheingold finalist earned her a brief guest spot. She was then offered a screen test at Paramount. Nothing came of it at first, for a May 1957 visa application for a magazine photo shoot in Rio de Janeiro showed her still living in New York City and listed her profession as "Nurse".

However, MGM signed Pierce in 1958 to a short-term contract for a role as a nurse in the film Never So Few with Frank Sinatra and Steve McQueen. Though uncredited, the part was publicized for being filled by a real nurse. She did another bit part in MGM's The Subterraneans, and played a New York cover girl in Bells Are Ringing with Judy Holliday and Dean Martin. MGM then signed her to a long-term contract.

Television was also part of her MGM contract obligations. Pierce did an episode of MGM's television series, The Thin Man with Peter Lawford in early 1959, and appeared as the studio's representative on The Bob Hope Show that Fall, for the "Deb Stars of 1959". MGM also loaned Pierce out to other television production companies; she had credited roles in four different series in the latter half of 1959, and five more during 1960. She also did many photo shoots for the studio, and for her own benefit. A two-page photo-illustrated spread in Weekend Magazine, a supplemental insert for many newspapers, showed her interacting with strangers on the streets of a big city to build name recognition.

Pierce had her fourth film role for MGM in Where the Boys Are. Her next film for the studio was the widely panned Go Naked in the World, released in 1961. By this time Pierce was twenty-nine years old and had only played minor parts in her five films for MGM. She was popular with other TV production companies, so although MGM didn't renew her long-term contract she continued to be occasionally cast in studio produced and/or distributed projects.

== Television success ==
Once freed from her studio contract in 1962, Pierce tripled the number of television series she had done annually during her MGM years. She had leading guest star roles on such popular shows as Adventures in Paradise, Bronco, Route 66, The Many Loves of Dobie Gillis, Alfred Hitchcock Presents, and Wagon Train, often with her photo used to advertise the upcoming episode in newspapers.

She also had a prominent and credited role in her sixth film, a collection of three Edgar Allan Poe stories called Tales of Terror. (Note: Contemporary newspaper reviews list this picture as Poe's Tales of Terror) The film was produced by AIP and released in the summer of 1962. Pierce starred in the "Morella" segment with Vincent Price, with the much younger Leona Gage playing Pierce's mother.

Her television success continued throughout 1963, while her old studio MGM called her back to play Robert Taylor's niece in Cattle King, released during Summer 1963.

By the summer of 1965 she had had guest star spots on dozens of popular television series, some of them for multiple episodes. She had also appeared on various NBC talk shows promoting upcoming episodes on that network, particularly the new series in which she would have star billing as a regular.

== My Mother the Car ==
The first word of this new series came during December 1964, when columnist Arlene Garber announced that a pilot had just been made "for a series that has just about the silliest premise I've ever heard of." During the next six months the proposed series drew equally disbelieving comments from other television critics.

The series starred Jerry Van Dyke and Pierce, as Dave and Barbara Crabtree. He was a small town attorney, she was his wife, and they had two children. The premise of the show was that Dave Crabtree's mother (the voice of Ann Sothern) haunts a 1928 Porter touring car he finds on a used car lot, speaking to him only, through the radio. It doesn't matter that few cars had radios prior to 1930, because no such car as a 1928 Porter existed: the NBC studio mechanics cobbled it together from several other period autos. Sothern's voiceover lines were recorded separately, so there was no real dialog interaction between her and Van Dyke, who admitted he had only met her once, when the pilot was made.

Some columnists reported producer concerns that Dick Van Dyke's relentless promotion of his younger brother's new show would backfire. The younger Van Dyke may have been partly responsible for a major change in Pierce's appearance, after speaking to an interviewer in May 1965, five months before the premiere.

We had a real find in Maggie. She has much the same quality as Mary Tyler Moore on Dick's show. She even looks a lot like Miss Moore.

Pierce, whose last TV appearances just prior to filming My Mother the Car still showed shoulder-length brunette hair similar to Moore's, would now sport a blond bouffant style at the show's debut, courtesy of the director who claimed her dark brunette hair didn't show up well in color. (The pilot, made in November 1964, was in black and white, but NBC subsequently decided the show should be in color).

Critics noted that television was used to talking animals like Mr. Ed, and ghosts coming back to haunt the living as in Topper, but the combination of both gimmicks (with a car instead of an animal) in one show struck as ludicrous, and they continued to hammer away at it in the press. In truth, the show did quite well in ratings during its first months, so that NBC let it go on for nearly a full season. Other comical fantasy shows often succeed thru whimsy or eccentric characters, but the Crabtree family was rendered blandly normal by the writers. The thinness of the car's necessity for many storylines also pointed up the weakness of the entire premise.

For Pierce, this show marked both the high and low point of her show business career. Besides her star billing, it represented her only recurring role in television. The long publicity lead-in to the show and its good ratings in the first month saw her make many public appearances on local television and at public events. Even critics who hated the show praised her performance.

But the show's growing notoriety within the industry seemed to affect her judgement. She gave an interview midway thru the season where she claimed not to care about the jibes aimed at the show by critics, because she was just using the series as a means to an end.

All I'm interested in is using the show for as much publicity value as I can get. Of course, I like the show. But that doesn't necessarily mean that I think my character is wonderful. She isn't. My role is all hemmed in. Jerry and the car get all the laughs. I took the part because to succeed in this business and to become well-known you have to be on a series regularly.

My Mother the Car was the last television series on which Pierce ever performed.

== Later career ==
After the series was cancelled, Pierce had one more performing role, for the film The Fastest Guitar Alive, in which she co-starred with Roy Orbison. She and Joan Freeman played Civil War era sisters in love with Confederate spy Orbison. The film was a flop with audiences and critics, and seems to have killed Orbison's nascent acting career.

Despite having no stage background, Pierce went into play production after marrying producer and theatre owner Jerome Minskoff. As "Maggie Minskoff" she was production coordinator for the long-running Broadway musical revival Irene, starring Debbie Reynolds, staged in the Minskoff Theatre with her husband as co-producer. She managed the Minskoff Theatre during the late seventies, drawing the ire of Liz Smith who insinuated she regularly overbooked the rehearsal space. But Maggie Minskoff was also credited by Alvin Ailey dance company manager Bill Hammond with providing discounted space in the Minskoff Theatre for their rep company and dance school in 1980, and for convincing her husband to join its board and do fundraising for them.

Her last production credit was as co-producer for the off-Broadway production of Love, based on Luv by Murray Schisgal. The musical was performed at the Audrey Wood Theater in New York City during April 1984, starring Nathan Lane and Judy Kaye.

== Personal life and death ==
Pierce was an impulsive, outgoing person, who delighted in speaking with interviewers. Her background stories as related in newspapers changed over the years, confusing the issues of where she went to school, how long she was a nurse or model, and how her show business break occurred.

According to columnist Walt Hackett, Maggie Pierce had hazel-colored eyes. She ate only one meal per day, and also swam 200 yards daily. She was a cigarette smoker, and admitted she occasionally lit one up just to drive away bores. She loved sports, played soccer in high school, and as an adult was catcher on a weekend softball team made up of Hollywood women.

She was regularly mentioned in the columns of Hedda Hopper, Louella Parsons, and other syndicated gossip-mongers, particularly during her MGM days. According to them, her long-term romances included a broken engagement with businessman Bob Neal, and a never-quite-announced engagement to David Lange, younger brother of actress Hope Lange.

Around 1966 she hooked up with real estate tycoon Jerome "Jerry" Minskoff, who was fifteen years older, and married with three children. (Note: Some sources wrongly attribute these three children to Pierce, but all of Minskoff's progeny were from his first marriage to Lillian Rubenstein in 1940. Pierce never had any children of her own.) Some sources say they married after his divorce, in Las Vegas, Nevada during 1966, but the only marriage license in public records for the couple is from New York City for 1971. Minskoff produced Broadway plays in the theater his family opened. He was nominated for Tony Awards as a producer seven times, winning in 1986 for a revival of Sweet Charity. They lived in his Manhattan and London homes, until his death in August 1994.

Upon being widowed, Pierce appears to have eventually moved to Las Vegas, Nevada. She died April 5, 2010, in Danbury, Connecticut, at the age of 78.

== Filmography ==
Film (by year of first release)
Year	Title	Role	Notes
1959	Never So Few	Nurse	Uncredited first film has Pierce tending to a wounded Frank Sinatra. Studio publicity made much of her being an RN.
1960	The Subterraneans	Redhead	Another uncredited role has Pierce compete with Leslie Caron for George Peppard
1960	Bells Are Ringing	NY Cover Girl	
1960	Where the Boys Are	Dody	Used extensively for promotions and publicity material, Pierce still was uncredited
1961	Go Naked in the World	Girl	Pierce's fifth film for MGM was a critical failure
1962	Tales of Terror	Lenora Locke	Pierce was in the "Morella" segment with Vincent Price and Leona Gage
1963	Cattle King	June Carter	Pierce returned to MGM for a part in this so-so Western
1967	The Fastest Guitar Alive	Flo Chesnut	Pierce and Joan Freeman play Civil War era sisters after Roy Orbison

Television (in original broadcast order) including network but excluding local talk shows
Year	Series	Episode	Role	Notes
1957	The Tonight Show	Finale	Herself	Her screen debut was on Steve Allen's final night hosting
1959	The Thin Man	Season 2 Episode 33: "Bat McKidderick"	Zo	This was part of her MGM contract obligation
1959	General Electric Theatre	Season 8 Episode 1: "Miracle at the Opera"	Catherine	Dog sings flawless opera role in German but can't get screen credit
1959	Wagon Train	Season 3 Episode 5: "The Elizabeth McQueeny Story"	Roxanne	Bette Davis shepards Pierce and other girls to a dance hall
1959	The Bob Hope Show	Deb Stars of 1959	Herself	Bob Hope's annual parade of talent included Pierce representing MGM
1959	Not For Hire	Season 1 Episode 9: "The Fickle Fingers"	Joan Whittier	
1959	Peter Gunn	Season 2 Episode 13: "Terror on Campus"	Carol	
1959	Law of the Plainsman	Season 1 Episode 13: "The Toll Road"	Ellen Dawson	Pierce plays orphaned daughter shocked into amnesia by parent's killers
1960	Death Valley Days	Season 8 Episode 13: "The Reluctant Gun" (Note: Some sources have this episode first broadcast in December 1959, but no contemporary newspaper listings earlier than January 1960 can be found.)	Susan	Lawyer Temple Houston helps Pierce's boyfriend
1960	Overland Trail	Season 1 Episode 2: "The O'Mara's Ladies"	Kathy Dale	O'Mara (Sean McClory) has four card dealing ladies including Pierce
1960	Pony Express	Season 1 Episode 2: "The Replacement"	Ella Sidell	
1960	Bat Masterson	Season 3 Episode 3: "Bat Trap"	Amber Mason	
1960	Wagon Train	Season 3 Episode 37: "The Shadrack Bennington Story"	Jennifer 'Jenny' Robertson	Snake oil salesman David Wayne entrances Pierce's character
1961	Michael Shayne	Season 1 Episode 27: "The Boat Caper"	Amanda Wells	
1961	Checkmate	Season 1 Episode 28: "Goodbye, Griff"	Joan Seaford	
1961	The Dick Powell Theater	Season 1 Episode 8: "The Geetas Box"	Helen	Pierce and Cliff Robertson star as bank robbers
1961	Perry Mason	Season 5 Episode 11: "The Case of the Left-Handed Liar"	Casey Daniels	Pierce's boyfriend (Ed Nelson) is accused of killing her father
1962	87th Precinct	Season 1 Episode 15: "Main Event"	Martha Costello	Her boxer boyfriend (Brad Weston) has hoodlum trouble
1962	Alfred Hitchcock Presents	Season 7 Episode 17: "The Faith of Aaron Menefee"	Emily Jones	Pierce plays the lively daughter of a faith healer
1962	Wagon Train	Season 5 Episode 21: "The Daniel Clay Story"	Francis Cole	Pierce entices a young man to trap his father (Claude Rains)
1962	Adventures in Paradise	Season 3 Episode 23: "A Bride for the Captain"	Claudine Miller	Capt Troy (Gardner McKay) and Pierce are tricked into an engagement
1962	The Many Loves of Dobie Gillis	Season 3 Episode 25: "An American Strategy"	Pamela Lumpkin	Ambitious Dobie (Dwayne Hickman) dumps waitress for tycoon's daughter (Pierce)
1962	Bronco (Note: TV listings have this under The Cheyenne Show or Cheyenne, ABC's title for its wheel series of westerns)	Season 4 Episode 17: "The Immovable Object"	Melvina Streeter	Pierce's grandfather won't move for new dam
1962	Hazel	Season 1 Episode 34: "George's Assistant"	Gail Sanders	Pierce plays attorney hired as Baxter's (Don DeFore) assistant
1962	The Many Loves of Dobie Gillis	Season 3 Episode 34: "Bachelor Father... and Son"	Betty Sue Fosdick	
1962	Bachelor Father	Season 5 Episode 40: "Curfew Shall Not Ring Tonight"	Connie Carson	
1962	Route 66	Season 3 Episode 10: "Poor Little Kangaroo Rat"	Liz Penfold	Pierce is in a triangle with Leslie Nielsen and Joanne Linville
1962	Going My Way	Season 1 Episode 9: "Mr. Second Chance"	Marilyn Harrison	Hoodlum (Dan Duryea) wants to attend daughter's (Pierce) wedding
1962	Archie (Note: Included here since Pierce would have had a credited regular role, though it was likely never broadcast. Some sources date it to 1964 instead of 1962. Available on YouTube in slightly truncated form.)	(Pilot) Life with Archie	Miss Kenny	Pilot for an unsold series, in which Pierce plays a high school principal's secretary
1963	Alcoa Premiere	Season 2 Episode 17: "Five, Six, Pick Up Sticks"	Secretary	
1963	The Many Loves of Dobie Gillis	Season 4 Episode 19: "Two for the Whipsaw"	Cynthia Vanderfeller	Pierce is a fortune hunter tricked into a date
1963	The Dakotas	Season 1 Episode 9: "Incident at Rapid City"	Catherine Mitchell	Deputy Stark (Chad Everett) deals with Pierce and renegade US Cavalry
1963	77 Sunset Strip	Season 5 Episode 22: "Nine to Five"	Jeri McLeod	
1963	Hawaiian Eye	Season 4 Episode 23: "The Sisters"	Nancy Cobinder	Detective (Grant Williams) investigates sisters Myrna Fahey and Pierce
1963	The Alfred Hitchcock Hour	Season 1 Episode 27: "Death and the Joyful Woman"	Jean Aguilar	Pierce's husband (Don Galloway) fights his own father (Gilbert Roland)
1963	Laramie	Season 4 Episode 32: "The Road to Helena"	Ruth Franklin	Bank robber and daughter (Pierce) need help returning the loot
1963	The Greatest Show on Earth	Season 1 Episode 5: "Garve"	Betty	Circus rider (Hugh O'Brien) romances man's daughter (Pierce)
1963	Channing	Season 1 Episode 5: "Dragon in the Den"	Jean Curtis	Pierce gets involved with visiting politician William Shatner
1964	My Favorite Martian	Season 1 Episode 36: "A Nose for News"	Linda	Co-worker Pierce is romanced by reporter Tim O'Hara (Bill Bixby)
1964	The Alfred Hitchcock Hour	Season 3 Episode 9: "Triumph"	Mrs. Lucy Sprague	Missionary nurse (Pierce) mixes with another couple
1964	Jack Eigen (Note: Eigen had a late-night local talk show on NBC channel 5 in Chicago in 1964. Given his past record, it was probably pre-recorded.)	(Talk Show)	Herself	Robert Vaughn and Pierce were Jack's guests
1965	The Fugitive	Season 2 Episode 25: "May God Have Mercy"	Nurse Stockwell	Pierce plays a hospital prison ward nurse
1965	The Man from U.N.C.L.E.	Season 1 Episode 26: "The Love Affair"	Pearl Rolfe	College girl Pierce helps unmask a criminal cult
1965	Wagon Train	Season 8 Episode 24: "The Indian Girl Story"	Clare Evers	Pierce plays a pioneer woman with the wagon train
1965	Today	(1965-07-06)	Herself	Jerry Van Dyke and Pierce discussed their new series
1965	My Mother the Car	All 16 Episodes	Barbara Crabtree	
1966	My Mother the Car	All 14 Episodes	Barbara Crabtree	
