= Charles Wright (novelist) =

American novelist (1932–2008)

- Born: June 22, 1932; New Franklin, Missouri, U.S.
- Died: October 1, 2008 (aged 76); Manhattan, New York, U.S.
- Occupation: Novelist
- Writing career
- Language: English
- Notable works: The Messenger (1963); The Wig (1966); Absolutely Nothing to Get Alarmed About (1973)

Charles Stevenson Wright (June 22, 1932 – October 1, 2008) was an American novelist. He wrote the novels The Messenger (1963), The Wig (1966) and Absolutely Nothing to Get Alarmed About (1973).

== Early life ==
Wright was born in New Franklin, Missouri, on June 4, 1932. After the death of his mother, he was sent at the age of four to live with his maternal grandmother, who encouraged a love of reading in him. He dropped out of high school, and his only further education was a brief stint at the Handy Writers' Colony in Marshall, Illinois, taught by James Jones. Afterward he was enlisted in the Army.

== Writing career ==
In 1955, Wright moved to Manhattan, New York, and worked a number of low-paid jobs while writing his first novel, The Messenger, which was published by Farrar, Straus and Giroux in 1963. His second novel, The Wig, received positive reviews, with Conrad Knickerbocker calling it "brutal, exciting and necessary" in The New York Times. His third and last novel, Absolutely Nothing to Get Alarmed About, sections of which were previously published as essays in The Village Voice, came out in 1973.

In his New York Times column "American Beauties", devoted to undersung American books, Dwight Garner compared reading Wright to "a steep, stinging pleasure", while Ishmael Reed has described Wright as "Richard Pryor before there was a Richard Pryor. Richard Pryor on paper." Reed contributed an introduction to The Collected Novels of Charles Wright (Harper Perennial, 2019).

== Bibliography ==
- The Messenger (1963)
- The Wig (1966)
- Absolutely Nothing to Get Alarmed About (1973)
- Absolutely Nothing to Get Alarmed About: The Complete Novels of Charles Wright (1993)
