= John Bowers (writer) =

American writer (1928–2025)

- Born: John William Bowers; March 12, 1928; Lenoir City, Tennessee, U.S.
- Died: August 17, 2025 (aged 97); New York City, U.S.
- Education: Science Hill High School; University of Tennessee
- Occupation: Writer
- Writing career
- Period: c. 1960s–2000s

John William Bowers (March 12, 1928 – August 17, 2025) was an American writer.

== Life and career ==
Bowers was born in Lenoir City, Tennessee on March 12, 1928. He was raised in Johnson City, Tennessee, during the Great Depression and World War II era. He graduated from Science Hill High School in 1946 and from the University of Tennessee in 1951. From there, he attended the Handy Writers' Colony in Marshall, Illinois, founded by Lowney Turner Handy and her husband, Harry Handy, along with her student, the best-selling novelist James Jones. An autobiographical account of this adventure is Bowers's first major book, the memoir The Colony, published in 1971.

During the 1960s, Bowers published numerous interviews and articles in major magazines, including The New York Times, Playboy, Sports Illustrated, New York, Cosmopolitan, and Harper's, some of which were collected in paperback under the title The Golden Bowers in the early 1970s. His first novel, No More Reunions (1973), about his teen years in Johnson City, was optioned for film but the movie was never made. A second novel of that period, Helene (1976), is a Lolita-like tale set in 1950s America with college-age males and a young teenage girl.

In the Land of Nyx: Night and Its Inhabitants (1984), Bowers' next novel, was a study of the subculture of people who live their lives at night rather than during the daylight. Probably inspired by his father, who was night manager at the local railroad station during his childhood, this book is difficult to classify in any standard genre, and languished somewhat after its release because bookstores and libraries did not know quite what to do with it.

Turning his attention to historical examination of the Civil War, Bowers wrote Stonewall Jackson: Portrait of a Soldier (1990) and Chickamauga and Chattanooga: The Battles That Doomed the Confederacy (2000), which mix fact, fiction, and anecdotes.

For over two decades he was an associate professor in the Writing Program at Columbia University. His play Remembrance of Things Present has been produced twice off-Broadway.

Bowers died in New York City on August 17, 2025, at the age of 97.

== Selected publications ==
- The Colony (1971)
- The Golden Bowers (1971)
- No More Reunions (1973)
- Helene (1976)
- In the Land of Nyx: Night and Its Inhabitants (1984)
- Stonewall Jackson: Portrait of a Soldier (1990)
- Chickamauga and Chattanooga: The Battles That Doomed the Confederacy (2000)
- Remembrance of Things Present
