= Robert Middleton =

American actor (1911–1977)

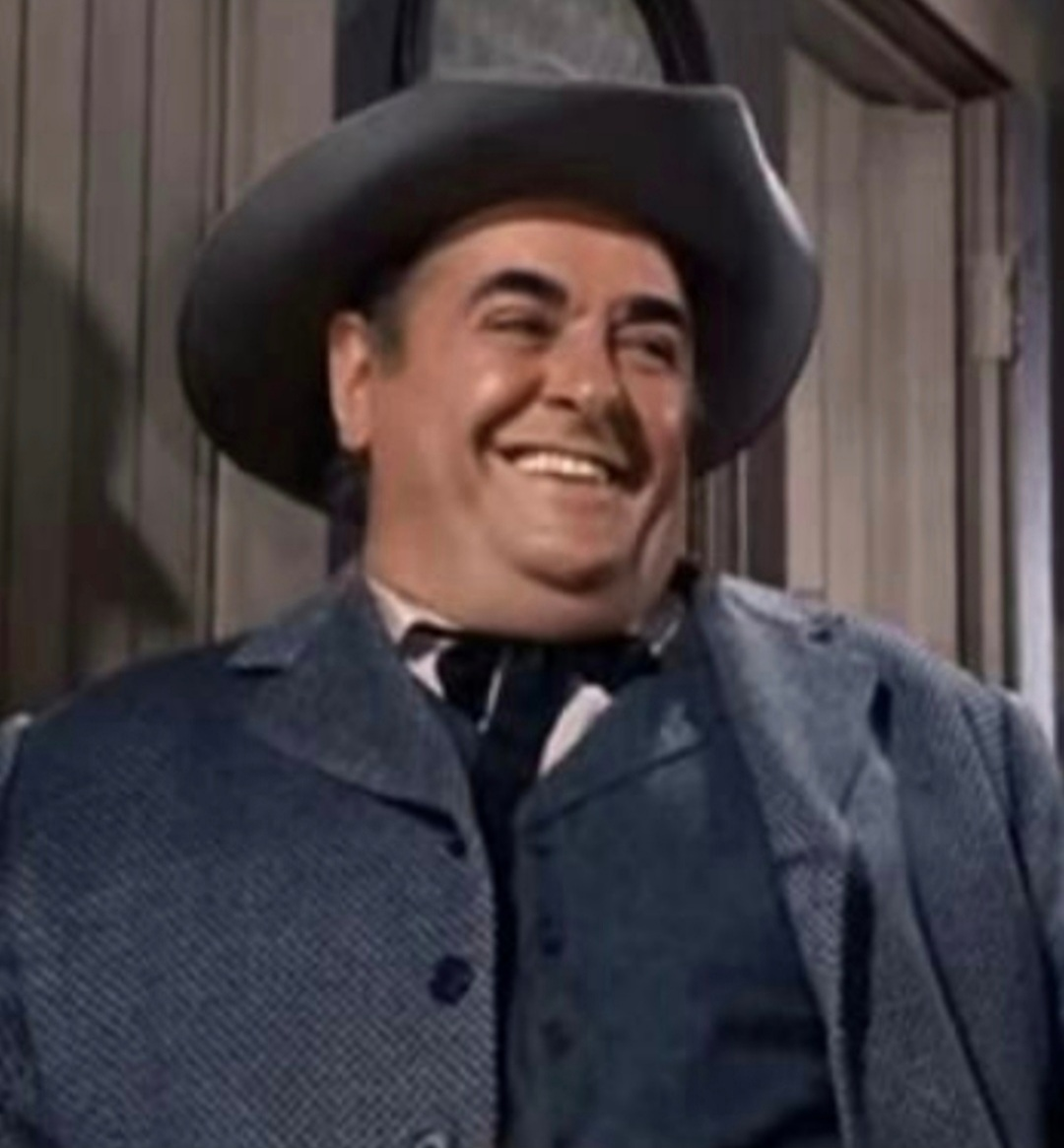
- Middleton in the TV series Bonanza (1960)
- Born: Samuel Abraham Messer; May 13, 1911; Cincinnati, Ohio, U.S.
- Died: June 14, 1977 (aged 66); Encino, California, U.S.
- Education: Cincinnati Conservatory of Music; Carnegie Institute of Technology
- Occupation: Actor
- Years active: 1951–1977
- Spouses: Lucille Van Flymen (m. 1934; div. 1949) Roberta Cecil Kelley (m. 1951; div. 1956)
- Children: 2

Robert Middleton (born Samuel Abraham Messer; May 13, 1911 – June 14, 1977) was an American film and television actor known for his large size, beetle-like brows, and deep, booming voice (for which he was known as "Big Bob Middleton"), usually in the portrayal of ruthless villains.

== Early years ==
A native of Cincinnati, Ohio, Middleton was one of four children of a building contractor. He trained for a musical career at the Cincinnati Conservatory of Music and Carnegie Tech in Pittsburgh, Pennsylvania.

== Career ==
Middleton's career in entertainment began with a job as an announcer on WLW radio in Cincinnati. He worked steadily as a radio announcer and actor.

One of his early works was as the narrator of the educational film Duck and Cover. After appearing on the Broadway stage and live television, Middleton began appearing in films in 1954, and in film opposite Humphrey Bogart in The Desperate Hours (1955), Danny Kaye in The Court Jester (1955), Gary Cooper in Friendly Persuasion (1956), Richard Egan and Elvis Presley in Love Me Tender (1956), Dorothy Malone and Robert Stack in The Tarnished Angels (1958), Robert Taylor and Richard Widmark in The Law and Jake Wade (1958), and Dean Martin in Career (1959).

Middleton appeared in many television programs in the 1950s and 1960s, including the CBS anthology series Appointment with Adventure. He played a dishonest candidate for the United States House of Representatives in an episode of ABC's The Real McCoys, starring Walter Brennan and Richard Crenna. In the story line, Middleton falsely claimed to have previously been a farmer in a bid for the farm vote. Middleton was cast as "The Tichborne Claimant" in the NBC anthology series The Joseph Cotten Show.

In 1956, he guest-starred on James Arness's TV Western series Gunsmoke, playing the title character in the episode "Dutch George" (S1E32), a flamboyant career horse thief who was friends with Matt Dillon in their wilder younger days (this episode unveiled some of Dillon's shadier past, once being a young man who also might have stolen, who at a yet to be revealed crossroad in life, opted to be a lawman). In 1960 he appeared on Wagon Train S3 E21 "The Tom Tuckett Story" as Nat Burkett.

He starred as Lucius Crane in 1959 in an unaired pilot episode for a detective series called The Fat Man based on a successful radio series of the same name. In 1961, he was cast as Arthur Sutro in the episode "The Road to Jericho" of the ABC Western series, The Rebel, starring Nick Adams, and guest-starred in the episode "A Man of Means" of the short-lived crime adventure-drama series The Investigators, starring James Franciscus and James Philbrook.

Middleton was cast in ten episodes of the ABC family Western drama The Monroes, which costarred Michael Anderson, Jr., and Barbara Hershey. In 1963 he portrayed Josh Green in the episode "Incident of the Mountain Man" on CBS's Rawhide.

Among his several appearances in the long-running Alfred Hitchcock Presents, he portrayed a gangster in high places, Mr. Koster, in the 1956 episode "The Better Bargain". In 1958, he played the villain in the first episode of NBC's Bat Masterson Western series, starring Gene Barry in the title role. He appeared in four episodes of The Untouchables, including in the role of Chicago mayor Anton Cermak in the two-part part episode "The Unhired Assassin". In 1961, he appeared in the episode "Accidental Tourist" on the James Whitmore ABC legal drama The Law and Mr. Jones. That same year, he portrayed the highly sympathetic but fiercely dedicated state executioner in "Guillotine", an episode of the American anthology series Thriller.

He appeared in three episodes of Bonanza from 1960 to 1967. In 1960, Middleton guest-starred on the episode "Death at Dawn," portraying the ruthless Sam Bryant. In February 1964, he starred as mountain man Grizzly Martindale on the episode "King of the Mountain." Middleton made his final appearance as the wealthy C.J. Shasta on the episode "The Greedy Ones" in May 1967.

Middleton performed fantastically as defendant, Judge Daniel Redmond, in the 1963 Perry Mason episode "The Case of the Witless Witness". In the early 1950s, he also appeared on Broadway in The Wild Duck (1951), A Red Rainbow (1953), and Ondine (1954). Among his other notable roles in films includes The Court Jester (1955), in which he plays a grim and determined knight who jousts with Danny Kaye in the famous "pellet with the poison" sequence. Much later, in 1977, he was cast as United States Secretary of War Edwin M. Stanton in The Lincoln Conspiracy. On television series, Middleton was most often cast in dramas as brutish mountain men, corrupt town bosses and leaders of lynch mobs. Occasionally, though, he did guest-star in comedies, such as his portrayal of a KAOS villain in the 1970 episode "I Am Curiously Yellow", the final installment of the weekly series Get Smart.

== Personal life and death ==
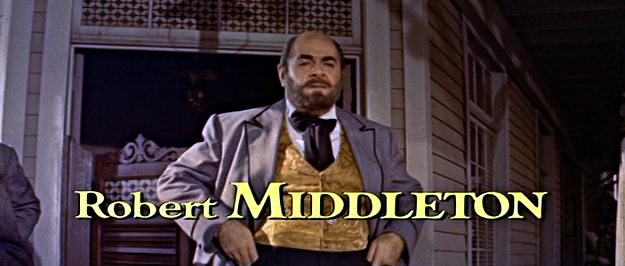
Robert Middleton in the trailer of The Proud Ones (1956)

On July 14, 1951, Middleton married his second wife, Roberta, in Cincinnati; they separated on September 5, 1955. Their two sons were the subjects of a custody hearing on February 15, 1956. Middleton sought custody in the divorce suit, asserting that his wife had a romantic relationship with his cousin.

Middleton died on June 14, 1977, in Encino, California, at the age of 66.

== Selected Films & Television ==
- The Silver Chalice (1954) – Idbash
- The Big Combo (1955) – Police Captain Peterson
- The Desperate Hours (1955) – Sam Kobish
- Trial (1955) – A.A. 'Fats' Sanders
- The Court Jester (1955) – Sir Griswold
- Red Sundown (1956) – Rufus Henshaw
- Alfred Hitchcock Presents (Season 2 Episode 9: "Crack of Doom") (1956) - Sam Klinker
- Alfred Hitchcock Presents (Season 2 Episode 11: "The Better Bargain") (1956) - Louis Koster
- The Proud Ones (1956) – Honest John Barrett
- Friendly Persuasion (1956) – Sam Jordan
- Love Me Tender (1956) – Mr. Siringo
- Alfred Hitchcock Presents (Season 2 Episode 37: "The Indestructible Mr. Weems") (1957) - Brother Cato Stone
- The Lonely Man (1957) – Ben Ryerson
- So Lovely... So Deadly (1957) – Eddie Rocco
- The Tarnished Angels (1957) – Matt Ord
- The Walter Winchell File "The Law and Aaron Benjamin" (1957) – Aaron Benjamin
- Day of the Badman (1958) – Charlie Hayes
- The Law and Jake Wade (1958) – Ortero
- No Place to Land (1958) – Buck LaVonne
- Don't Give Up the Ship (1959) – Vice Admiral Philo Tecumseh Bludde
- Career (1959) – Robert Kensington
- Bonanza (1960) - Sam Bryant
- Hell Bent for Leather (1960) – Ambrose
- The Great Impostor (1961) – R.C. Brown
- Gold of the Seven Saints (1961) – Amos Gondora
- Gunsmoke (Season 8 Episode 10 "The Hunger") (1962) - Dorf
- Cattle King (1963) – Clay Mathews
- For Those Who Think Young (1964) – Burford Sanford Cronin
- A Big Hand for the Little Lady (1966) – Dennis Wilcox
- Bonanza "The Greedy Ones" S8 E34 (1967)
- The Cheyenne Social Club (1970) – Barkeeper – Great Plains Saloon
- Which Way to the Front? (1970) – Colonico
- Columbo (Season 3 Episode 4 "Double Exposure") (1973) - Vic Norris
- Even Angels Eat Beans (1973) – Angelo
- The Harrad Experiment (1973) – Sidney Bower
- The Lincoln Conspiracy (1977) – Edwin M. Stanton
