= Archer House Hotel =

Historic hotel in Illinois, US

- U.S. National Register of Historic Places
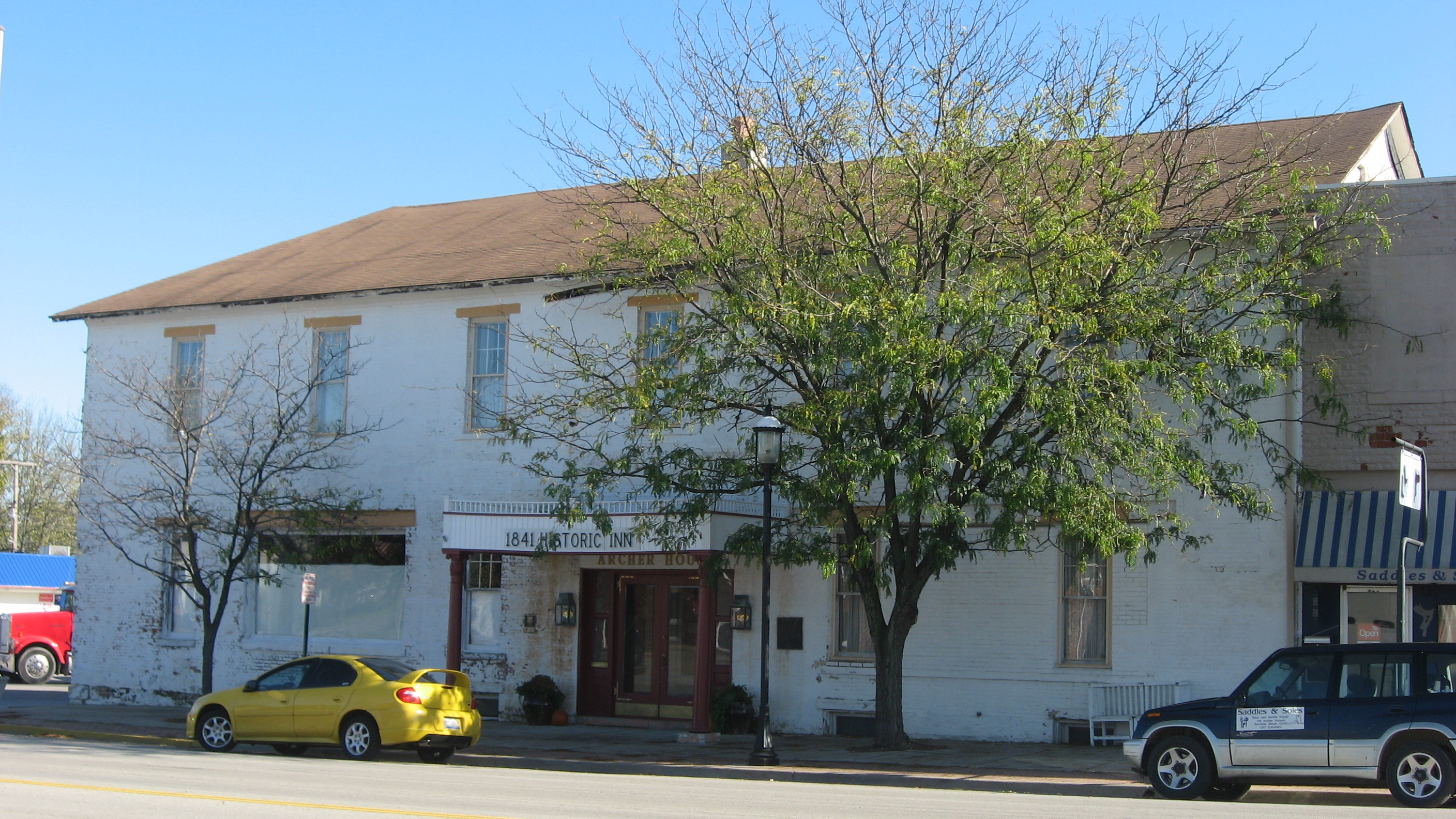

- Location within Illinois Location within the United States
- Location: 717 Archer Ave., Marshall, Illinois
- Coordinates: 39°23′27″N 87°41′40″W
- Area: 0.1 acres (0.040 ha)
- Built: 1841
- NRHP reference No.: 76000685
- Added to NRHP: March 16, 1976

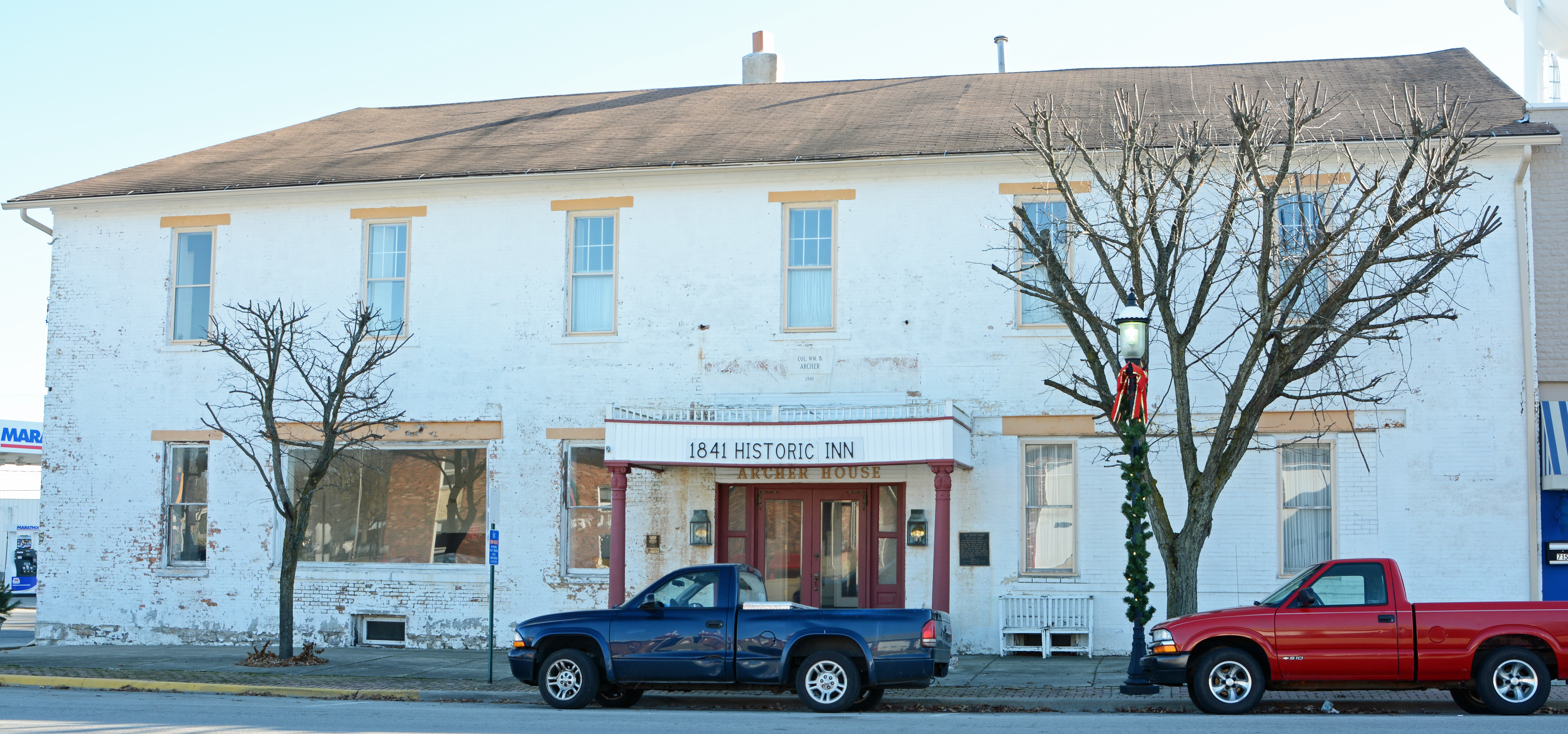
Archer House in 2015

The Archer House Hotel is a historic hotel located at 717 Archer Avenue in Marshall, Illinois. William B. Archer, the founder of Marshall, opened the hotel in 1841. The brick hotel was one of the most lavish buildings in the city upon its opening. As a stopping point for stagecoach lines, the hotel was also the city's social center and the first place to receive out-of-town news. Archer was a member of the Illinois Legislature for sixteen years and a friend and colleague of Abraham Lincoln. Lincoln regularly visited Marshall, and he stayed in the hotel during his visits. Another U.S. president, Grover Cleveland, has also stayed at the hotel.

The hotel was added to the National Register of Historic Places on March 16, 1976.

From 1933 to 1943, during the years when it was known as the National-Dixie Hotel, three of the rooms served as the Central Office of Pi Beta Phi fraternity for Women. Marshall resident Beatrice Stephenson Purdunn, a Pi Beta Phi alumna from the University of Illinois chapter. served as the Director of the Central Office.
