= Cattle King =

1963 American western film

- Theatrical Film Poster
- Directed by: Tay Garnett
- Written by: Thomas Thompson
- Produced by: Nat Holt
- Starring: Robert Taylor
- Cinematography: William E. Snyder
- Edited by: George White
- Music by: Paul Sawtell; Bert Shefter
- Color process: Metrocolor
- Production company: Missouri Productions
- Distributed by: Metro-Goldwyn-Mayer
- Release date: July 31, 1963
- Running time: 90 minutes
- Country: United States
- Language: English
- Budget: $535,000
- Box office: $1,065,000

Cattle King is a 1963 American Western film directed by Tay Garnett. It stars Robert Taylor and Robert Loggia. It was also known by the alternative title of Guns of Wyoming in some countries.

== Plot ==
A range war is building in Wyoming. Caught on opposite sides are Sam Brassfield, who builds fences to protect his grass land, and Clay Mathews, a cattle baron determined to keep an open range.

Both men argue their case before the cattlemen's association to President Chester A. Arthur, who happens to be in Cheyenne for a visit. A hired gun of Mathews picks a fight with Brassfield's top man, Johnny Quatro, in a saloon, then vows revenge after Brassfield intervenes.

Brassfield proposes marriage to Sharleen Travers, who runs a neighboring ranch with her brother Harry. At first the spineless Harry sides with Mathews, but after a scolding from his sister, he apologizes to Brassfield. A while thereafter, the hired gun Bodine shoots and wounds the unarmed Harry, then kills Sharleen in cold blood.

Another rancher mistakenly blames Brassfield for a raid that Matthews ordered. He changes sides after overhearing Brassfield speak on his behalf to the President. In a final showdown, Brassfield urges Mathews to keep the dispute between themselves, then outdraws Mathews in a gunfight. Bodine also pulls a gun, but Quatro shoots him down.

== Cast ==
- Robert Taylor as Sam Brassfield
- Robert Loggia as Johnny Quatro
- Joan Caulfield as Sharleen Travers
- Robert Middleton as Clay Mathews
- Larry Gates as President Chester A. Arthur
- Malcolm Atterbury as Abe Clevenger
- William Windom as Harry Travers
- Virginia Christine as Ruth Winters
- Richard Devon as Vince Bodine
- Ray Teal as Ed Winters
- Bob Ivers as Webb Carter
- Maggie Pierce as June Carter
- Woodrow Parfrey as Stafford
- Richard Tretter as Hobie Renton
- John Mitchum as Tex

== Box office ==
According to MGM records, the film earned $435,000 in the US and Canada and $650,000 elsewhere resulting in a gain of $20,000.

== See also ==
- List of American films of 1963
