= So Lovely... So Deadly =

1957 film by Will Kohler

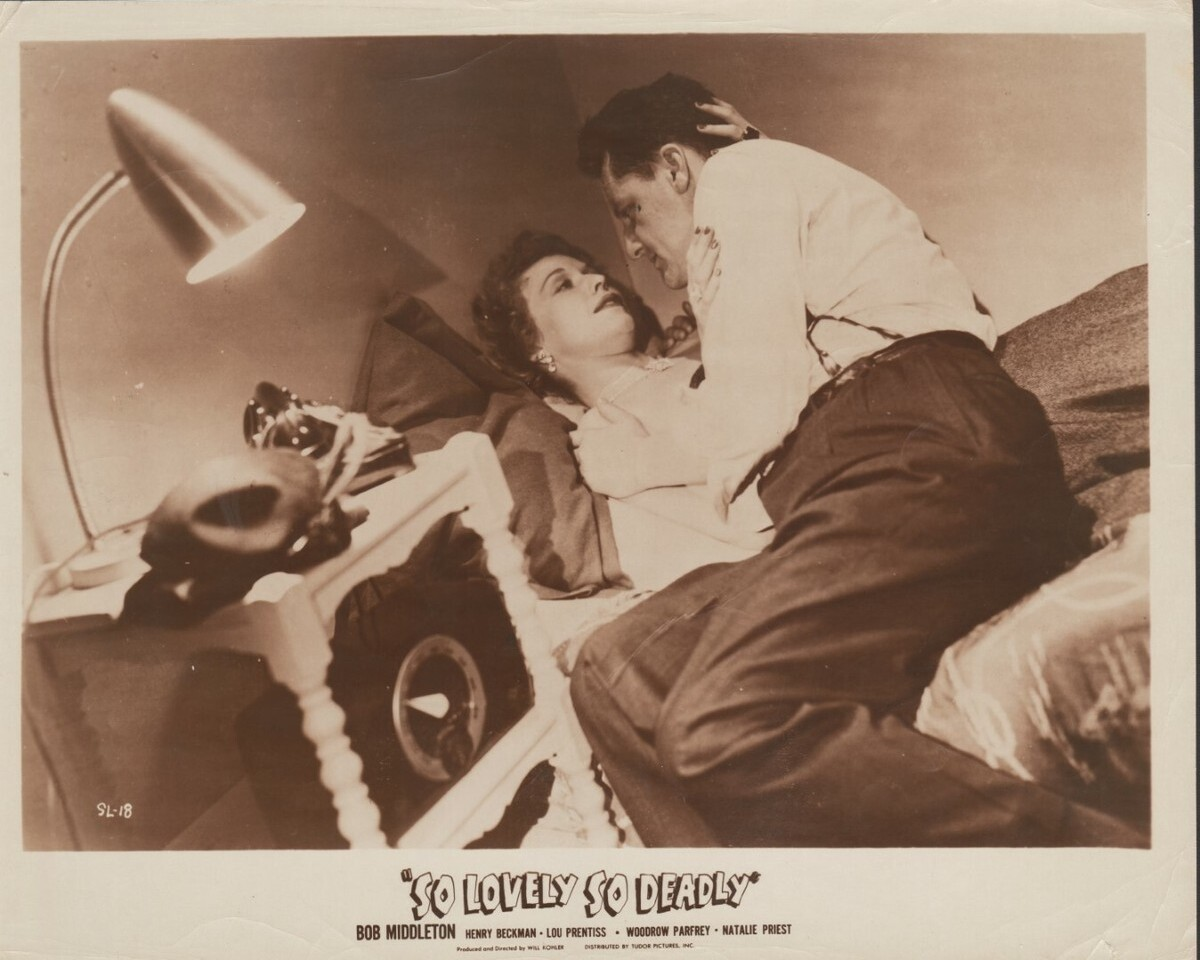
- Lobby card for the film
- Directed by: Will Kohler
- Written by: Hugh Prince
- Story by: Hugh Prince
- Starring: Henry Beckman; Lou Prentis; Robert Middleton; Woodrow Parfrey
- Cinematography: Al Hellman
- Edited by: Jean Oser
- Music by: Ted Royal; Fred Jacobs (music editor)
- Production company: Cinelux Productions
- Distributed by: Tudor Pictures (United States); Monarch Film Corporation Ltd. (United Kingdom)
- Release date: October 1957
- Running time: 72 minutes
- Country: United States
- Language: English

So Lovely... So Deadly is a 1957 American film noir crime thriller directed by Will Kohler. The film stars Henry Beckman and Lou Prentis, with Robert Middleton and Woodrow Parfrey in supporting roles. It is notable as the first credited film appearance of character actor Parfrey.

Presently, the film is considered potentially lost, as no prints are known to exist in major film archives.

== Plot ==
In New York, Steve Clark, a mostly unemployed private investigator, receives a phone call from Bill Emerson, who runs Escort Service Inc. Bill assigns Steve to escort Mrs. Ava Eastwood, a wealthy Park Avenue widow, for one week. However, before he can begin, a young woman visits his hotel room seeking help, claiming Eddie Rocco recommended him. When the phone rings and she realizes the caller is Mrs. Eastwood, she flees.

That evening, Steve meets the attractive Mrs. Eastwood. She wants him to escort her stepdaughter, Karen, whose father recently died in a riding accident. Karen has become withdrawn, and Mrs. Eastwood suspects she is using narcotics. Steve is introduced as an old friend from Chicago to help revive Karen's interest in life. Upon being introduced, Steve realizes Karen is the woman who visited him earlier, but they both pretend not to know each other.

Later, Steve tracks Karen to a bar and confirms she isn't using drugs. Karen accuses him of being in league with her stepmother. Steve then visits Rocco, the bar's owner, to ask why he suggested him to Mrs. Eastwood. Rocco simply replies that he felt Steve was the best man for the job. Soon after, Mrs. Eastwood visits Steve's hotel room and reveals that she and Dr. Parks, the family psychiatrist, believe Karen killed her father by sabotaging his riding tack. She suggests Karen only meant to injure him to win his attention back from her stepmother. Following this revelation, she seduces Steve.

Steve receives a call from a man offering information about the accident for a price, and they arrange a meeting in the country. Before Steve leaves, Karen visits and warns him that her stepmother married her father only for his money. She threatens to shoot Steve, but he disarms her. At the rendezvous, an unseen assailant knocks Steve unconscious. He wakes to find the informer dead, shot by Steve's own gun. Realizing he is being framed, Steve investigates the Eastwood stables and finds a sabotaged saddle strap in the tack room.

When Rocco tells Steve the murdered man was a disbarred jockey, Steve briefly suspects Rocco, who insists he is innocent. Steve then visits Dr. Parks, who maintains that Karen killed her father. Despite Karen claiming she remembers nothing, Parks and Mrs. Eastwood plan to send her to a sanitarium. However, Karen later tells Steve she does remember seeing her father fall before blacking out. Rocco, having done his own digging, tells Steve he believes Mrs. Eastwood planned the accident to frame Karen and claim the insurance settlement.

Steve arranges for all the parties to meet at the stable. Bill is supposed to bring Karen but arrives alone and draws a gun, demanding Steve explain his theory. Steve explains that whoever cut the strap also accidentally cut themselves. He points to a bandage on Bill's hand and reveals he has uncovered Bill's past: Bill was once married to Mrs. Eastwood. Bill had introduced her to the wealthy Eastwood as part of a long-con scheme to collect insurance money.

Steve then makes one final revealtion: Mrs. Eastwood intended to double-cross Bill and run away with Dr. Parks. After Mrs. Eastwood and Parks admit to their secret relationship, a betrayed Bill shoots her and flees. Steve chases him along a railroad track to a high water tower. They both climb to the top, where Bill shoots and wounds Steve. However, as Bill tries to head back down to avoid the closing police, he loses his footing and falls to his death.

== Cast ==
- Henry Beckman as Steve Clark
- Lou Prentis as Karen Eastwood
- Robert Middleton as Eddie Rocco (credited as Bob Middleton)
- Woodrow Parfrey as Bill Emerson
- Natalie Priest as Mrs. Ava Eastwood
- Don De Leo as Dr. William Parks

== Production and release ==
The film was produced by Cinelux Productions and distributed by Tudor Pictures.

So Lovely... So Deadly was released in the United States in October 1957. Due to its low-budget nature and the eventual shutdown of its independent production and distribution companies, it fell into obscurity. It is currently listed as "potentially lost" due to the absence of physical copies in public or private preservation institutions.
