= Never the Same Again =

1956 novel by Jerry Tschappat

- First edition
- Author: Jerry Tschappat (under the pseudonym Gerald Tesch)
- Language: English
- Publisher: G. P. Putnam's Sons
- Publication date: 1956
- Publication place: United States
- Media type: Paperback
- Pages: 318

Never the Same Again is a 1956 Bildungsroman by Jerry Tschappat, written under the name Gerald Tesch.

Never the Same Again is the story of the coming-of-age of an adolescent boy, Johnny Parish. Johnny forms a close friendship with 30-year-old Roy Davies.

== Release details ==
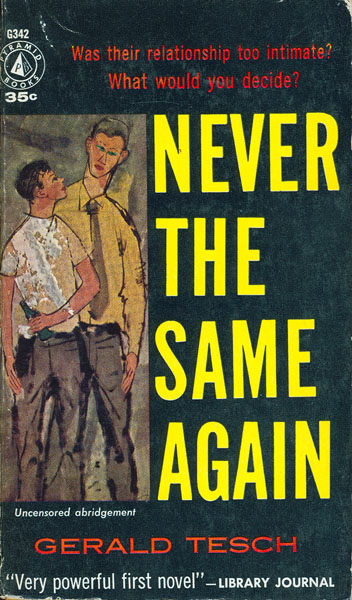
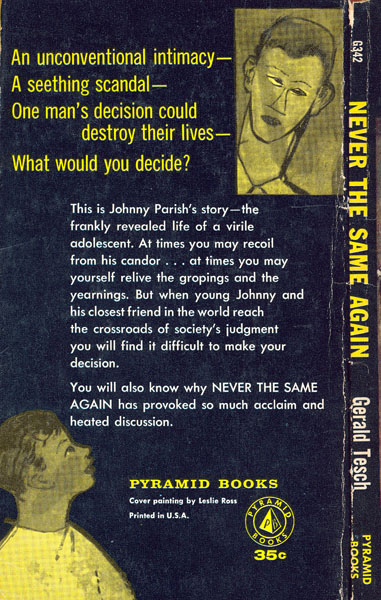
Front and back of 1958 Pyramid Books edition.

It was published by G. P. Putnam's Sons, without an ISBN. It was republished in 1958 by Pyramid Books.

== See also ==
- Handy Writers' Colony
