= William Beatty Archer =

American politician

Member of the Illinois House of Representatives
- In office 1824–1826

Member of the Illinois Senate
- In office 1826–1834

Member of the Illinois House of Representatives
- In office 1838–1842

Member of the Illinois House of Representatives
- In office 1860–1862

Personal details
- Born: January 30, 1793 Scott County, Kentucky, U.S.
- Died: August 9, 1870 (aged 77) Marshall, Illinois, U.S.
- Party: Republican; Whig
- Military career
- Conflicts: Black Hawk War

William Beatty Archer (January 30, 1793 – August 9, 1870) was an Illinois politician and businessman. Archer was a member of the Illinois General Assembly from 1825 until 1843, during which time he also served on the state Board of Canal Commissioners and unsuccessfully ran for higher office twice. He also founded the city of Marshall, Illinois, was a captain in the Black Hawk War, and supported Abraham Lincoln's vice presidential nomination at the first Republican National Convention in 1856.

== Early life ==
Born in Scott County, Kentucky, Archer moved to Illinois with his family in 1817, settling on a farm in modern-day Clark County.

== Career ==
After Clark County was formed in 1819, Archer briefly served on the county's commissioners' court and circuit court before being elected to the Illinois House of Representatives in 1824. He continued to serve in the General Assembly until 1843, with terms in both the House of Representatives and the Illinois Senate. He ran for a Congressional seat in 1832 and lieutenant governor in 1834, though he lost both races. In 1836, he was named to the state's Board of Canal Commissioners, which oversaw the construction of the Illinois & Michigan Canal.

During the Black Hawk War in 1832, Archer served as a militia captain. He founded the city of Marshall, Illinois in 1835 along with Joseph Duncan; the new town was at the intersection of the National Road and a state road linking Chicago with Vincennes, Indiana. Archer also built the Archer House Hotel in Marshall, which was one of the first businesses and most prominent early buildings in the new city. Abraham Lincoln befriended Archer during their time serving together in the legislature, and he often visited Marshall and stayed in Archer's hotel.

After leaving the General Assembly, Archer regained his position as Clark County circuit clerk in 1848 and held it until 1852. He was also a delegate to Illinois' constitutional convention of 1847 and attempted another unsuccessful Congressional run as a Whig in 1854, this time losing to James C. Allen. After Archer successfully contested the election result, a repeat of the election was held in 1856, but he once again lost. He also served as a delegate to the first Republican National Convention in 1856, supporting his friend Lincoln's unsuccessful bid for the vice-presidential nomination.

== Death ==
Archer died in Marshall in 1870.

== Legacy ==
The Archer Heights neighborhood and Archer Avenue in Chicago are named for Archer due to his work with the Illinois & Michigan Canal.
