= Woodrow Parfrey =

American actor (1922–1984)

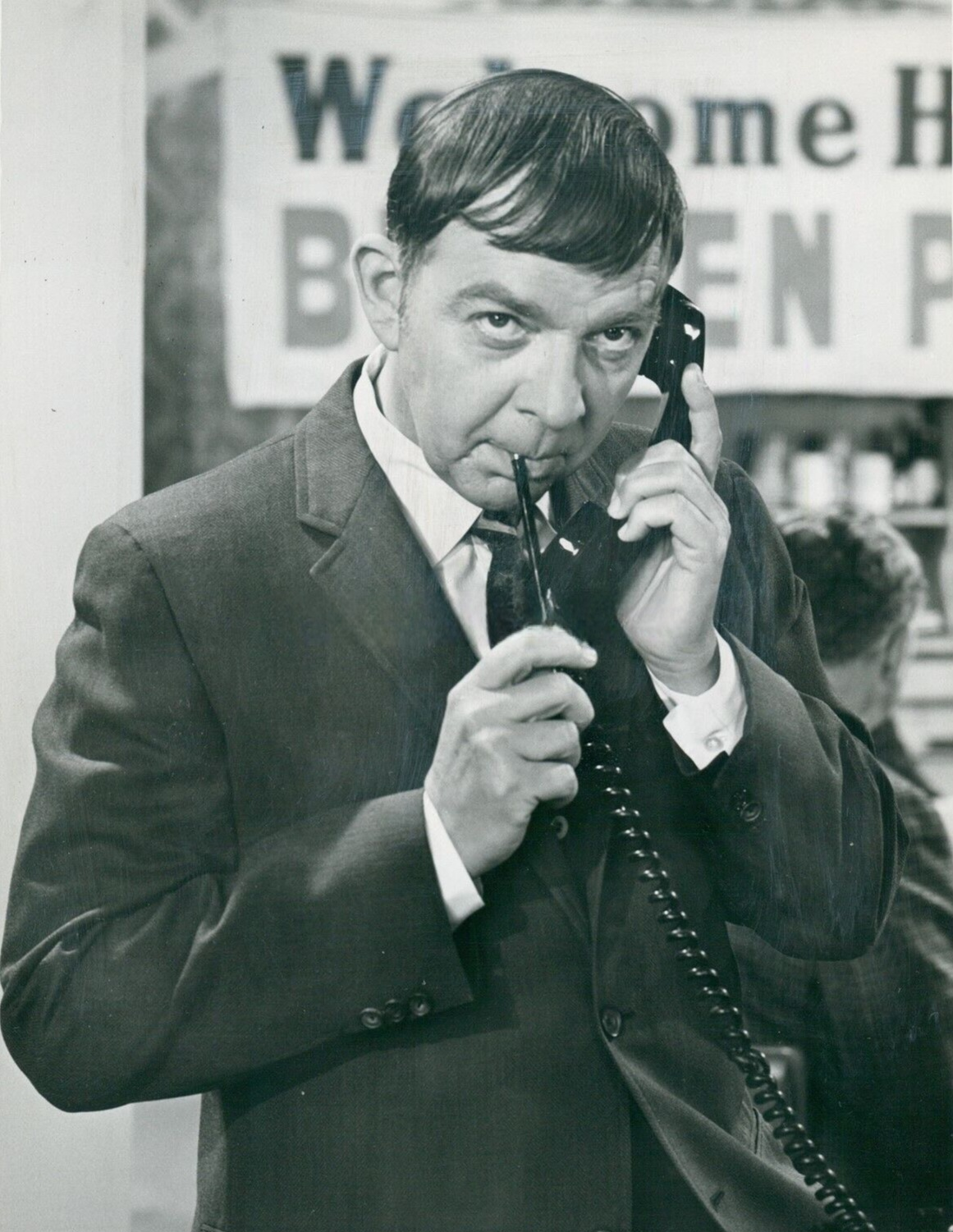
- Parfrey in Mayberry R.F.D. (1970)
- Born: Sydney Woodrow Parfrey; October 5, 1922; New York City, U.S.
- Died: July 29, 1984 (aged 61); Los Angeles, California, U.S.
- Occupation: Actor
- Years active: 1950–1984
- Spouse: Rosa Ellovich (m. 1950)
- Children: 4, including Adam Parfrey

Sydney Woodrow Parfrey (October 5, 1922 – July 29, 1984) was an American film and television actor from the 1950s to the early 1980s. He is often remembered as "one of TV's great slimeball villains".

== Early life ==
Parfrey was born on October 5, 1922, in New York City. He was orphaned as a teenager. He attended The New School, and worked as an automobile mechanic before going into the military.

== Military service ==
Parfrey served in the U.S. Army during World War II, fighting in the Battle of the Bulge where he was wounded and captured by the Germans. When he was released from the Army, testing indicated that he should become an actor, which led to his new profession.

== Career ==
Parfrey received a rare screen credit as a "Special Guest Star" in the "My Friend, My Enemy" episode of Bonanza.

Parfrey acted almost entirely on Broadway or regional stage in the late 1940s and 1950s, turning to television and film substantially in the 1960s. He played the unbalanced informer Herbert Gelman on Broadway in the original production of Advise and Consent (1961), for which he won the Fanny Kemble Award.

Though usually a supporting player, he played many focal television guest-star roles, mainly in the late 1960s when fantasy and spy shows relied heavily on distinctive guest players. He appeared five times on The Man from U.N.C.L.E., more than any other guest star except Jill Ireland, who also appeared five times. In 1962 Parfrey appeared as Joe Darby on the TV western The Virginian in the episode titled "The Accomplice". In 1962 he played the part of the murderer George Pickson in Perry Mason, "The Case of the Bogus Books". In 1963, he played the part of George Moffgat in Perry Mason, "The Case of the Drowsy Mosquito". In 1967 he appeared as Brock in the fourth season of the science fiction TV show Voyage to the Bottom of the Sea in the episode "Fatal Cargo". He later appeared as storekeeper Ike Godsey in The Homecoming: A Christmas Story (1971), the TV movie pilot for The Waltons (1971); The Moneychangers (1976); Backstairs at the White House (1979); and, in his only regular role, the short-lived 1979 CBS series Time Express.

Parfrey scored a few big A-movie parts, most notably as a prisoner in Papillon (1973). Parfrey's frequent association with that film's director, Franklin Schaffner, also included his role as Maximus, one of the three "See No Evil" orangutan judges in Planet of the Apes (1968). Later he would appear as a chimpanzee prefect on the television series based on the film franchise.

Parfrey also appeared routinely in films directed by Don Siegel and Clint Eastwood, including noted roles in Siegel's Charley Varrick (1973) and Eastwood's The Outlaw Josey Wales (1976).

His many film credits also include parts in Cattle King (1963), The War Lord (1965), The King's Pirate (1967), How to Save a Marriage and Ruin Your Life (1968), Madigan (1968), Sam Whiskey (1969), Cold Turkey (1971), Dirty Harry (1971), Oklahoma Crude (1973), Stay Hungry (1976), The Incredible Journey of Doctor Meg Laurel (1979), Carny (1980), Bronco Billy (1980), Used Cars (1980), The Seduction (1982), Frances (1982) and Jinxed (1982).

== Personal life ==
On February 18, 1950, Parfrey married Rosa Ellovich. He trained under acting teacher Erwin Piscator at the New School for Social Research.

== Death ==
Parfrey died of a heart attack on July 29, 1984, aged 61 years, in Los Angeles. He is buried in Los Angeles National Cemetery.

His son was "underground" publisher Adam Parfrey, who died at the same age as his father.

== Selected filmography ==
- So Lovely... So Deadly (1957) – Bill Emerson
- Johnny Gunman (1957) – Sidney Wells
- Perry Mason (1963) – George Moffgat
- Cattle King (1963) – Stafford
- The War Lord (1965) – Piet
- The Munsters (1965) – Mr. Petrie
- Hogan's Heroes (1965) – Dr. Schneider
- The Flying Nun (1966) – Weatherman
- The King's Pirate (1967) – Gow
- Lost in Space (1967) – Colonel Fogey
- The Flim-Flam Man (1967) – Supermarket manager
- Hogan's Heroes (1967) – Hugo Hindmann
- How to Save a Marriage and Ruin Your Life (1968) – Eddie Rankin
- Planet of the Apes (1968) – Maximus
- Madigan (1968) – Marvin
- I Dream of Jeannie (1969) – Mr. Farber
- Sam Whiskey (1969) – Thorston Bromley
- Cold Turkey (1971) – Tobacco executive
- Dirty Harry (1971) – Mr. Jaffe
- Oklahoma Crude (1973) – Lawyer
- Charley Varrick (1973) – Harold Young
- Papillon (1973) – Clusiot
- Hearts of the West (1975) – Mr. Gates – Producer (uncredited)
- Stay Hungry (1976) – Uncle Albert
- The Outlaw Josey Wales (1976) – Carpetbagger
- The Seniors (1978) – 1st Attorney
- WKRP in Cincinnati (1978) - Dr. Hy Monroe
- The Incredible Journey of Doctor Meg Laurel (1979) – Messerschmidt
- Carny (1980) – W. C. Hannon
- Bronco Billy (1980) – Dr. Canterbury
- Used Cars (1980) – Mr. Ghertner
- The Seduction (1982) – Store Salesman
- Jinxed (1982) – Insurance Agent
- Frances (1982) – Dr. Doyle
- The Sting II (1983) – Georgie
- Remington Steele (1984) – Archie Doke
