= John Scholfield =

American judge

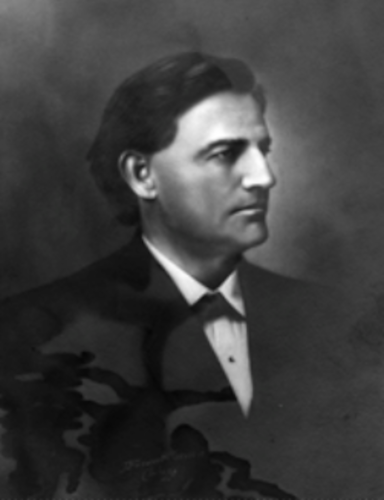
Scholfield's portrait at the Illinois Supreme Court.

John Scholfield (August 1, 1834 – February 12, 1893) was an American politician and jurist.

== Early life ==
Scholfield was born near Marshall, Clark County, Illinois.

== Education ==
Scholfield received his law degree from the University of Louisville School of Law in Louisville, Kentucky in 1856.

== Career ==
He then practiced law in Marshall, Illinois and served as state's attorney.

In 1861, Scholfield served in the Illinois House of Representatives as a Democrat. He was a delegate to the Illinois Constitutional Convention of 1870. From 1873 until his death in 1893, Scholfield served on the Illinois Supreme Court and was the chief justice. President Grover Cleveland offered to nominate Scholfield to be Chief Justice of the United States Supreme Court but Scholfield turned the nomination down.

== Death ==
Scholfield died at his home in Marshall, Illinois.
