= Never So Few =

1959 film by John Sturges

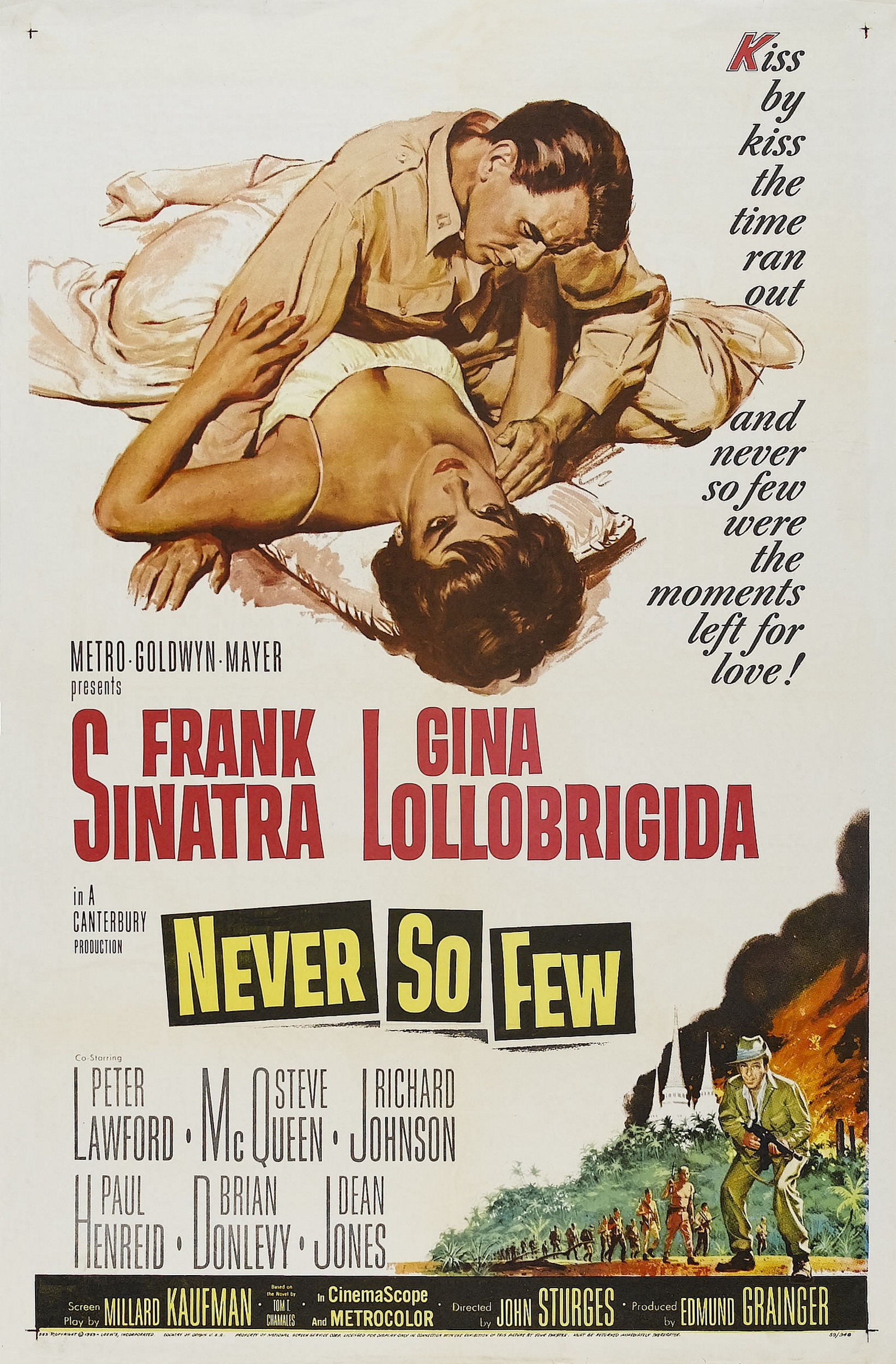
- Theatrical release poster by Reynold Brown
- Directed by: John Sturges
- Screenplay by: Millard Kaufman
- Based on: Never So Few; 1957 novel by Tom T. Chamales
- Produced by: Edmund Grainger
- Starring: Frank Sinatra; Gina Lollobrigida; Peter Lawford; Steve McQueen; Richard Johnson; Paul Henreid; Brian Donlevy; Dean Jones
- Cinematography: William H. Daniels
- Edited by: Ferris Webster
- Music by: Hugo Friedhofer
- Production company: Canterbury Productions
- Distributed by: Metro-Goldwyn-Mayer
- Release date: December 7, 1959
- Running time: 124 minutes
- Country: United States
- Language: English
- Budget: $3,480,000
- Box office: $5,270,000

Never So Few is a 1959 CinemaScope Metrocolor war film directed by John Sturges and starring Frank Sinatra, Gina Lollobrigida, Peter Lawford, Steve McQueen, Richard Johnson, Paul Henreid, Brian Donlevy, Dean Jones, Charles Bronson and Philip Ahn, and featuring uncredited roles by renowned Asian actors Mako, George Takei and James Hong. The script is loosely based on an actual OSS Detachment 101 incident recorded in a 1957 novel by Tom T. Chamales. Sinatra's character of Captain Tom Reynolds is based on a real OSS officer and, later, sheriff of Sangamon County, Illinois, U.S. Navy Lt. Meredith Rhule.

== Plot ==
Burma, 1943. American and British forces under the OSS join with native Kachin to hold back Japanese invaders, albeit with limited supplies and medical care. Captains Tom Reynolds and Danny De Mortimer fly to Calcutta to rectify both problems. While there, they are told to select any unattached army doctor for transfer to their unit. Later, while on furlough, they travel to a resort where Tom falls in love with Carla, mistress to a mysterious businessman. Tom and Danny also meet a doctor, Captain Travis. Much to his objections, they tag Travis for transfer to their unit, along with a tough, resourceful "kid" corporal named Ringa.

Back at their unit, Tom and Danny throw a Christmas bash with lots of drinking. The proceedings, however, are interrupted by a surprise Japanese raid. It is a costly affair. Some revelers are killed, and many, including Tom, are wounded. They are transported to a Calcutta hospital for recovery. Upon their return, the unit assaults a Japanese-held airstrip. The mission succeeds but results in many lives lost. On their way back to base, they come across a destroyed American convoy. Evidence indicates renegade Chinese were responsible. Tom orders a pursuit. They find the Chinese camp, locate their supply tent, and come upon several dozen American dog tags and personal effects. Shocked and outraged, Tom realizes Chinese have been killing American soldiers.

Tom radios OSS headquarters. He gets a reply ordering him to base as the Chungking government has lodged a complaint. While Tom consults with his officers, a Chinese soldier kills Danny. Tom angrily sends a message to OSS rebuffing their demand. He then orders Ringa to execute the prisoners. When Tom reports to OSS in Calcutta, he is placed under house arrest. There, he encounters an angry, vindictive officer from Washington, General Sloan, who tells Tom he is there to see him hang. Tom replies by showing the general a crate of American dog tags found at the renegade camp. Sloan quietly admits to being sickened by the sight. Hours later, when an arrogant Chinese representative, Gen. Chao, struts on the scene and demands an official apology, Sloan tells Chao, "You go to hell." Exonerated, Tom is freed and reunites with Carla before returning to the Kachin and the war.

== Cast ==
- Frank Sinatra as Captain Tom Reynolds
- Gina Lollobrigida as Carla Vesari
- Peter Lawford as Captain Grey Travis
- Steve McQueen as Corporal Bill Ringa
- Richard Johnson as Captain Danny De Mortimer
- Paul Henreid as Nikko Regas
- Brian Donlevy as General Sloan
- Dean Jones as Sergeant Jim Norby
- Charles Bronson as Sergeant John Danforth
- Philip Ahn as Nautaung, leader of the Kachin
- Robert Bray as Colonel Fred Parkson
- George Takei as Soldier in Hospital (uncredited)
- Kipp Hamilton as Margaret Fitch
- Isabel Cooley as Shan Girl
- James Hong as General Chao (uncredited)
- Mako as Soldier in Hospital (uncredited)
- Maggie Pierce as Nurse in hospital (uncredited)

== Production ==
Theatrical poster from the 1967 re-release of the film

Rat Pack cohort Sammy Davis Jr. was originally slated to play McQueen's role, but Sinatra replaced him after Davis criticized Sinatra during a radio interview. (In a similar move, Sinatra later recast the role of Rat Pack colleague Peter Lawford after Lawford failed to deliver his brother-in-law, President John F. Kennedy, for a stay at Sinatra's house, giving Lawford's part in Robin and the 7 Hoods to Bing Crosby, ironically Kennedy's choice as host for his visit. Sinatra never spoke to Lawford again.) Never So Few was the first of several movies Lawford would make with Sinatra.

McQueen was known at the time primarily for the television series Wanted Dead or Alive and the horror movie The Blob. Never So Few marked his introduction to working with director John Sturges, who went on to cast McQueen in his breakout movie role the following year as second lead in The Magnificent Seven, and later as the motorcycle-jumping lead in the classic, The Great Escape.

Richard Johnson had been put under contract by MGM.

== Release ==
On the original U.S. one-sheet theatrical poster (see infobox above), only Sinatra and Lollobrigida were top-billed. As illustrated in the 1967 re-release poster, McQueen's credit was moved above the title, and he was featured prominently in the artwork.

== Reception ==
=== Box office ===
According to MGM records, the film was popular, earning $3,020,000 in the U.S. and Canada, and $2,250,000 elsewhere, but because of its high cost, it resulted in a loss of $1,155,000.

=== Critical response ===
Opening to middling reviews, Never So Few was praised for its action sequences, but criticized for a romantic subplot that bogged down the film. Newcomer McQueen garnered the bulk of the film's good notice. Variety commented, "Steve McQueen has a good part, and he delivers with impressive style." And after viewing the film, The New York Times critic Bosley Crowther sarcastically proclaimed, "Frank Sinatra has been tapped to succeed Errol Flynn as the most fantastically romantic representation of the warrior breed on the screen."
