= Go Naked in the World =

1961 American drama Metrocolor film

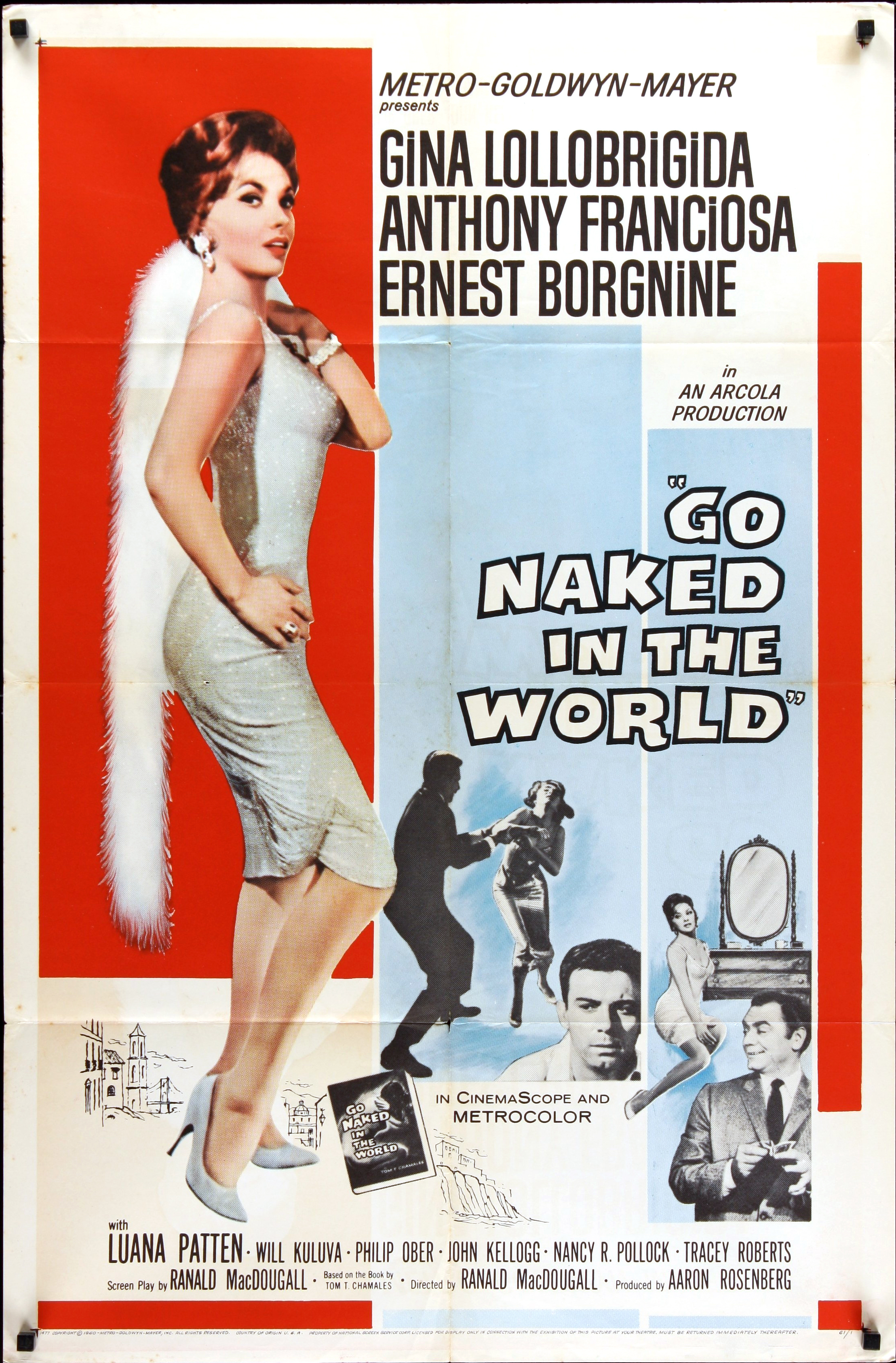
- Theatrical release poster by Reynold Brown
- Directed by: Ranald MacDougall; Charles Walters (uncredited)
- Written by: Ranald MacDougall
- Based on: Go Naked in the World by Tom T. Chamales
- Produced by: Aaron Rosenberg
- Starring: Gina Lollobrigida; Anthony Franciosa; Ernest Borgnine; Luana Patten; Will Kuluva; Philip Ober; John Kellogg; Nancy R. Pollock; Tracey Roberts
- Cinematography: Milton R. Krasner
- Edited by: John McSweeney Jr.
- Music by: Adolph Deutsch
- Production company: Arcola Pictures
- Distributed by: Metro-Goldwyn-Mayer
- Release date: March 10, 1961
- Running time: 103 minutes
- Country: United States
- Language: English

Go Naked in the World is a 1961 American drama film written and directed by Ranald MacDougall and co-directed by an uncredited Charles Walters and produced by Aaron Rosenberg. The film stars Gina Lollobrigida, Anthony Franciosa, and Ernest Borgnine. It is based on a 1959 novel of the same name by Tom T. Chamales.

== Plot ==
Nick Stratton (Anthony Franciosa) is attempting to find his own way in the world after returning home to San Francisco following a stint in the Army. His father Pete (Ernest Borgnine) is a self-made millionaire and important in the Greek immigrant community. Pete loves his son, but he tries to buy his love and dominate his life like he does his employees and business associates. Nick struggles to assert his own identity, but family pressure and his love for his father are very strong. Pete wants Nick to marry a nice Greek girl, the daughter of a business associate. Nick and Giulietta Cameron (Gina Lollobrigida), however, have already fallen deeply in love, though she is strangely reluctant to continue seeing Nick. He takes her as his date to his parents' wedding anniversary. Pete tells him in no uncertain terms that Giulietta is a prostitute, whose services Pete and many of his friends, who are present at the party, have purchased.

Nick tries to give Giulietta up, but they are madly in love. Everywhere they go, they keep meeting her former clients. Giulietta does everything she can to drive him away, telling him he is just another "John" who now bores her, but she is lying to try to spare him pain. She is devastated when she succeeds. When she sees him in a bar where she has gone with a former client, she deliberately flirts outrageously with every man in the place. Nick gets into a fight dragging men off her and is arrested.

In anguish, Giulietta steals a simple, white dress hanging from a clothesline, hanging her boa scarf in its place. She goes home, puts on the dress and jumps over the balcony to her death in the sea far below.

Nick enters the apartment and looks for Giulietta. He hears a commotion and spots a body face down in the water. Shocked fishermen pull Giulietta from the water and lay her on the beach. Nick runs through the crowd and embraces her briefly, but the police pull him off as a blanket is laid over her face. Seeing his father, a distraught Nick tells him that Giulietta should have known he would go back for her.

== Cast ==
- Gina Lollobrigida as Giulietta Cameron
- Anthony Franciosa as Nick Stratton
- Ernest Borgnine as Pete Stratton
- Luana Patten as Yvonne Stratton
- Will Kuluva as Argus Dlavolos
- Philip Ober as Josh Kebner
- John Kellogg as Cobby, Hotel Detective
- Nancy R. Pollock as Mary Stratton
- Tracey Roberts as Diana

== Reception ==
Upon its release, Bosley Crowther gave the film a scathing review: "Here is a film that its producer — not the censor, not anybody else; just its producer — should have taken out and burned." Le Monde likewise gave a scathing review, which read, "There is nothing to write about this inept film, which […] has Gina Lollobrigida as its main performer. We can regret that this actress has thus lost, under the makeup and tics of Hollywood, her personality to the point of resembling any star in an illustrated magazine. Only commercial reasons could have drawn her into this enterprise, the foolishness of which is matched only by its vulgarity."

According to MGM records, the film recorded a loss of $1,462,000.

== See also ==
- List of American films of 1961
