= Marshall, Illinois =

- City
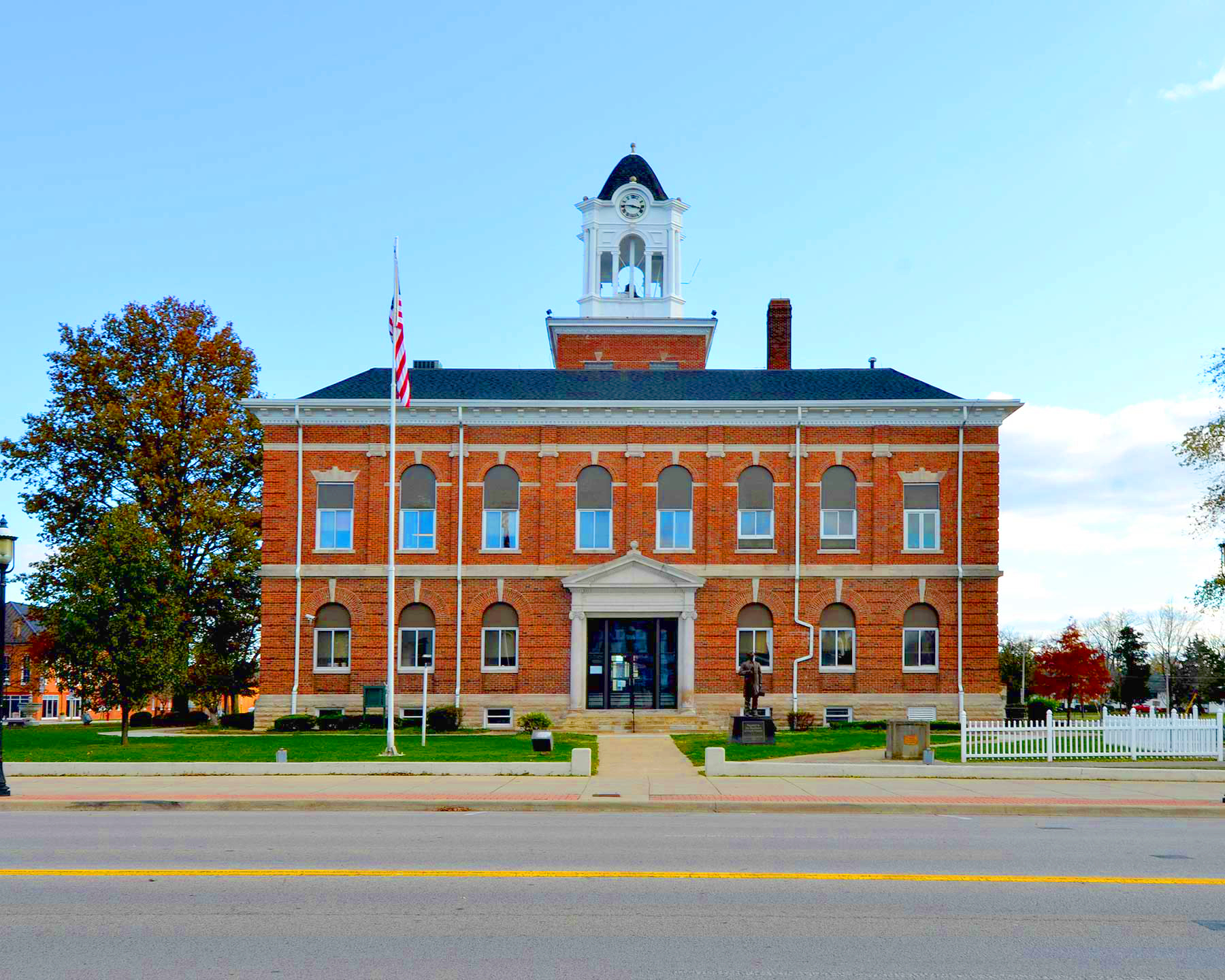
- Marshall, Illinois Court House
- Interactive map of Marshall, Illinois
- Location within Illinois Location within the United States
- Coordinates: 39°22′55″N 87°41′34″W
- Country: United States
- State: Illinois
- County: Clark
- Founded: 1835

Area
  - Total: 3.68 sq mi (9.53 km^{2})
  - Land: 3.66 sq mi (9.49 km^{2})
  - Water: 0.015 sq mi (0.04 km^{2})
- Elevation: 620 ft (190 m)

Population (2020)
  - Total: 3,947
  - Density: 1,076.7/sq mi (415.71/km^{2})
- Time zone: UTC-6 (CST)
  - Summer (DST): UTC-5 (CDT)
- ZIP code: 62441
- Area code: 217
- FIPS code: 17–47163
- GNIS feature ID: 2395021
- Website: City of Marshall, Illinois

Marshall is a city in and the county seat of Clark County, Illinois, United States, located approximately 20 miles (32 km) west of Terre Haute, Indiana. The population was 3,947 at the 2020 census.

== History ==
Marshall was officially organized by William B. Archer in 1835, eight years after the National Road entered the community. The city was named after John Marshall, chief justice of the U.S. Supreme Court. Marshall was incorporated on May 14, 1873.

In 1863, Marshall was the scene of conflict in which local Copperheads, who opposed the Civil War, sought to protect soldiers who had deserted from the Union Army. In March, 1863, an army detail from Indiana arrested several deserters. A local judge, Charles H. Constable, freed the deserters and ordered the arrest of two Union sergeants on kidnapping charges. This resulted in the dispatch of 250 soldiers under the command of Col. Henry B. Carrington by special train from Indianapolis, who surrounded the courthouse, freed the sergeants and arrested judge Charles H. Constable. The judge was, however, absolved several months later after presenting a highly technical defense.

Marshall was home to the Handy Writers' Colony, 1950–1964. The most famous writer associated with the Colony was the novelist James Jones, who built a home in Marshall and lived there ca. 1952–1957.

== Geography ==
According to the 2021 census gazetteer files, Marshall has a total area of 3.68 square miles (9.53 km^{2}), of which 3.67 square miles (9.51 km^{2}) (or 99.59%) is land and 0.02 square miles (0.05 km^{2}) (or 0.41%) is water.

== Demographics ==
Historical population
Census	Pop.	Note	%±
1880	1,885		—
1890	1,900		0.8%
1900	2,077		9.3%
1910	2,569		23.7%
1920	2,222		−13.5%
1930	2,368		6.6%
1940	2,758		16.5%
1950	2,960		7.3%
1960	3,270		10.5%
1970	3,468		6.1%
1980	3,379		−2.6%
1990	3,555		5.2%
2000	3,771		6.1%
2010	3,933		4.3%
2020	3,947		0.4%
U.S. Decennial Census

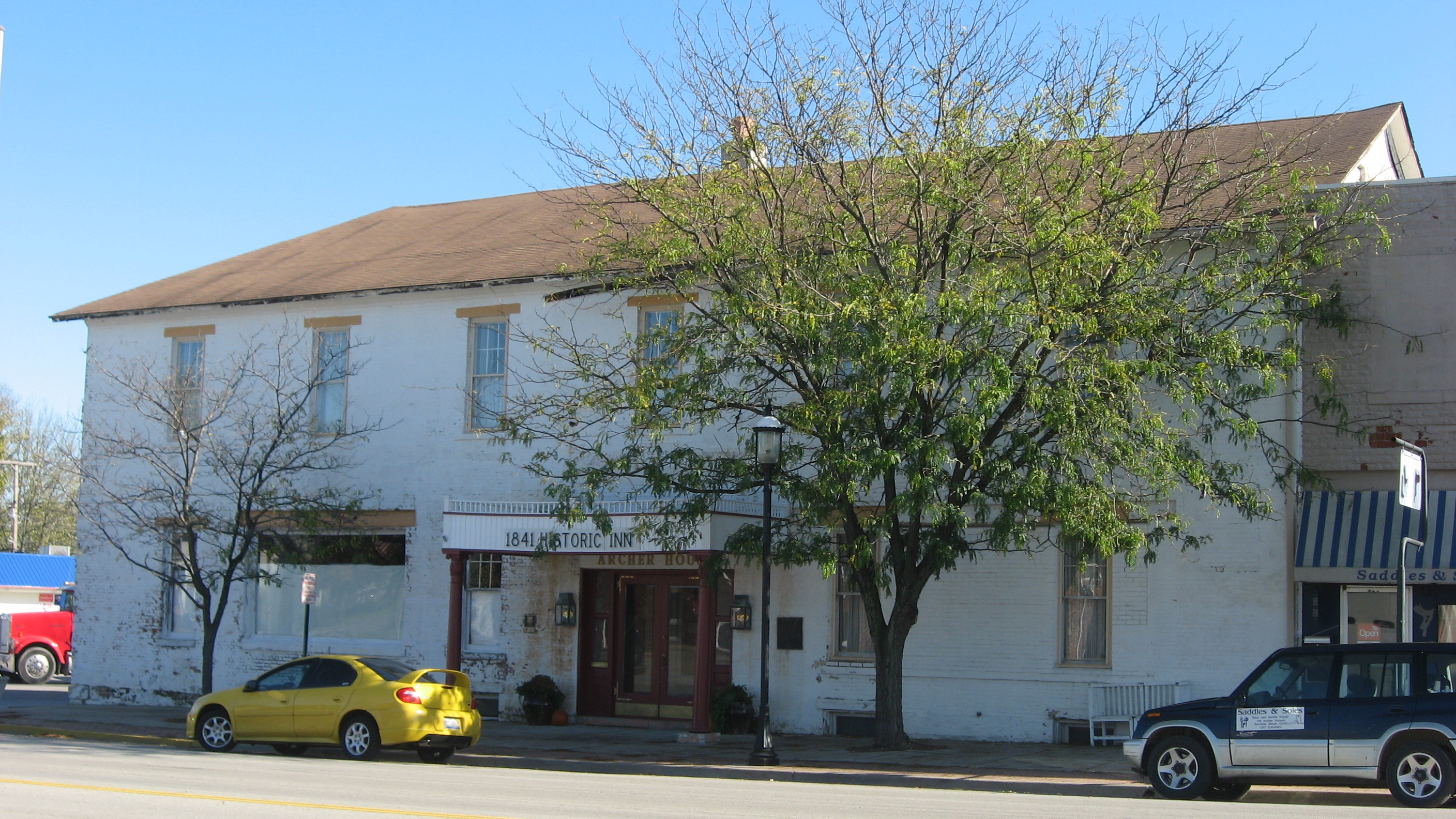
The Archer House Hotel is one of seven sites in Marshall listed on the National Register of Historic Places.

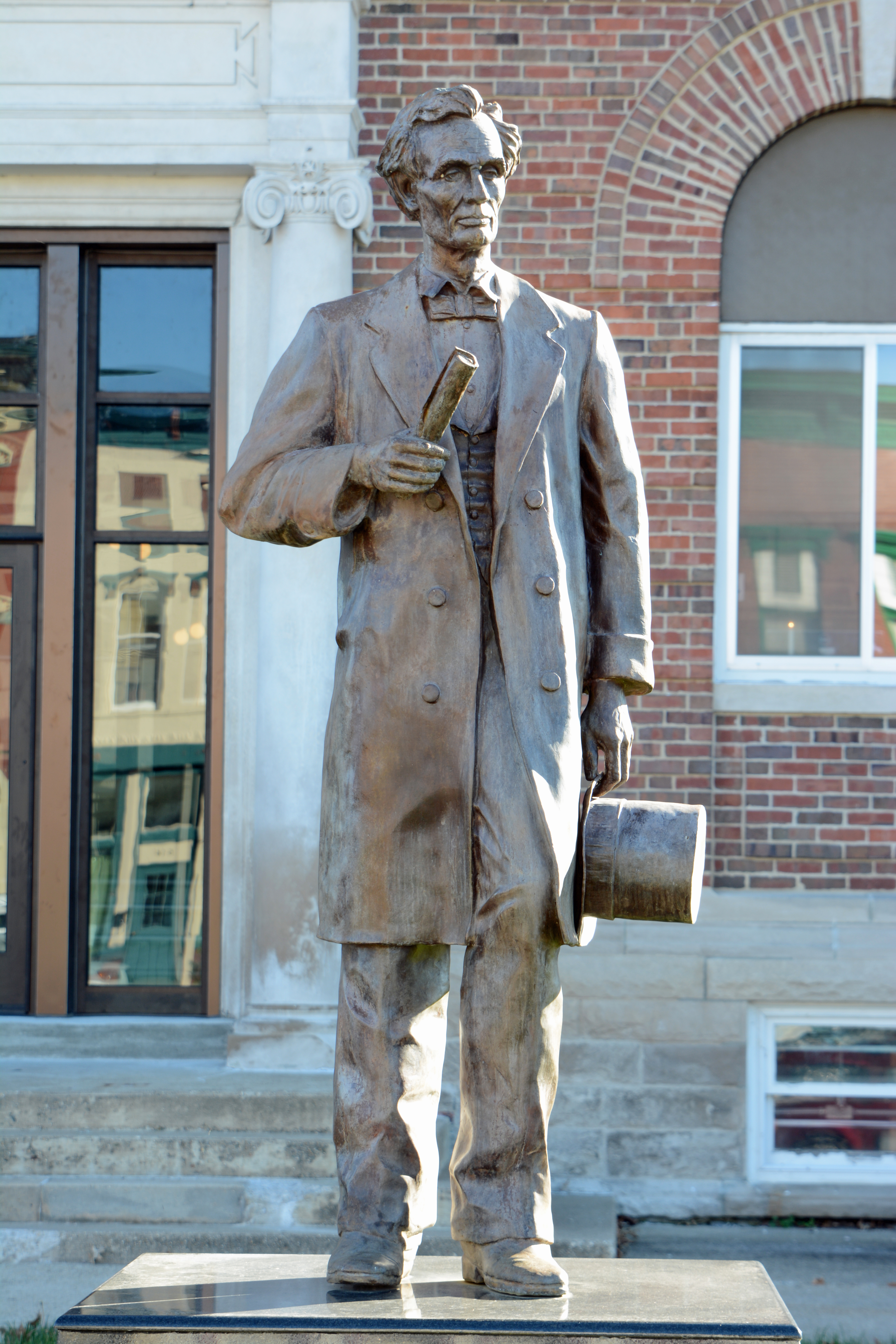
Statue of young Abraham Lincoln at the Marshall Illinois Courthouse

=== 2020 census ===
As of the 2020 census, Marshall had a population of 3,947 and 1,129 families residing in the city.

The population density was 1,072.26 inhabitants per square mile (414.00/km^{2}). There were 1,921 housing units at an average density of 521.87 units per square mile (201.50 units/km^{2}). Of the 1,737 households, 25.0% had children under the age of 18 living in them. Of all households, 38.9% were married-couple households, 20.7% were households with a male householder and no spouse or partner present, and 32.9% were households with a female householder and no spouse or partner present. About 38.8% of all households were made up of individuals, and 18.4% had someone living alone who was 65 years of age or older.

The median age was 41.7 years. 22.0% of residents were under the age of 18, and 20.8% were 65 years of age or older. For every 100 females, there were 96.5 males; for every 100 females age 18 and over, there were 94.1 males age 18 and over. 0.0% of residents lived in urban areas, while 100.0% lived in rural areas.

Of housing units, 9.6% were vacant. The homeowner vacancy rate was 3.3%, and the rental vacancy rate was 5.4%.

Racial composition as of the 2020 census
Race	Number	Percent
White	3,673	93.1%
Black or African American	25	0.6%
American Indian and Alaska Native	10	0.3%
Asian	35	0.9%
Native Hawaiian and Other Pacific Islander	0	0.0%
Some other race	59	1.5%
Two or more races	145	3.7%
Hispanic or Latino (of any race)	132	3.3%

=== Income and poverty ===
The median income for a household in the city was $51,201, and the median income for a family was $65,387. Males had a median income of $40,613 versus $32,910 for females. The per capita income for the city was $29,448. About 12.5% of families and 10.9% of the population were below the poverty line, including 14.8% of those under age 18 and 2.0% of those age 65 or over.

== Economy ==
The downtown district is centered on the county courthouse. The town's major employer, ZF, operates an automotive electronics manufacturing facility, employing a thousand area residents. Marshall is the site of the oldest continually operated hotel in Illinois, the Archer House.

== Arts and culture ==
Every autumn Marshall holds a Fall Festival.

The Marshall post office contains an oil on canvas mural, Harvest, painted in 1938 by Miriam McKinnie. Murals were produced from 1934 to 1943 in the United States through the Section of Painting and Sculpture, later called the Section of Fine Arts, of the Treasury Department.

== Government ==
The Marshall City Council consists of nine members: eight aldermen and the mayor.

== Notable people ==
- Robert H. Birch, American western outlaw, raised in Marshall
- Ed Carpenter, IndyCar Series driver, 2013 Indy pole sitter; raised in Marshall, IL
- Charles H. Constable, Attorney, Illinois State Senator; close friend of Abraham Lincoln
- Walter E. Cork, Illinois state representative and businessman, lived in Marshall
- Gerald Forsythe, businessman and auto racing magnate; born in Marshall
- James Jones, novelist, lived in Marshall ca. 1952–1957
- John W. Lewis Jr., politician; born in Marshall
- Ed Mayer, Major League Baseball player for the Philadelphia Phillies; born in Marshall
- John Scholfield, jurist and state legislator; lived in Marshall
- Jacob Zimmerman, United States Representative, newspaper editor, and businessman
