= Fort Madison–Keokuk micropolitan area =

Micropolitan statistical area in the United States

The Fort Madison–Keokuk, IA-IL-MO Micropolitan Statistical Area, as defined by the United States Census Bureau, locally known as the "Tri-State" area, was an area consisting of three counties – one in southeast Iowa, one in northeast Missouri, and one in west central Illinois, anchored by the cities of Fort Madison, Iowa and Keokuk, Iowa. As of the 2010 census, the μSA had a population of 62,105. An estimate by the Census Bureau, as of July 1, 2012, placed the population at 61,477, a decrease of 1.01%. When the 2023 definitions were released this area was dissolved with Lee County, Iowa being included as part of the Burlington–Fort Madison, IA–IL Combined Statistical Area.

== Counties ==
- Clark County, Missouri
- Hancock County, Illinois
- Lee County, Iowa (Central county)

== Communities ==
- Places with more than 10,000 inhabitants
  - Fort Madison, Iowa (Principal city)
  - Keokuk, Iowa (Principal city)
- Places with 1,000 to 5,000 inhabitants
  - Carthage, Illinois
  - Dallas City, Illinois
  - Hamilton, Illinois
  - La Harpe, Illinois
  - Kahoka, Missouri
  - Nauvoo, Illinois
  - Warsaw, Illinois
- Places with 500 to 1,000 inhabitants
  - Augusta, Illinois
  - Bowen, Illinois
  - Donnellson, Iowa
  - Montrose, Iowa
  - Plymouth, Illinois
  - West Point, Iowa
- Places with less than 500 inhabitants
  - Alexandria, Missouri
  - Basco, Illinois
  - Bentley, Illinois
  - Elvaston, Illinois
  - Ferris, Illinois
  - Franklin, Iowa
  - Houghton, Iowa
  - Luray, Missouri
  - Pontoosuc, Illinois
  - Revere, Missouri
  - St. Paul, Iowa
  - Wayland, Missouri
  - West Point, Illinois
  - Wyaconda, Missouri
- Unincorporated places
  - Adrian, Illinois
  - Argyle, Iowa
  - Breckenridge, Hancock County, Illinois
  - Burnside, Illinois
  - Chili, Illinois
  - Colusa, Illinois
  - Denmark, Iowa
  - Denver, Illinois
  - Disco, Illinois
  - Durham, Illinois
  - Fountain Green, Illinois
  - La Crosse, Illinois
  - Niota, Illinois
  - Pilot Grove, Iowa
  - St. Patrick, Missouri
  - Stillwell, Illinois
  - Sutter, Hancock County, Illinois
  - Tioga, Illinois
  - Webster, Illinois
  - Wever, Iowa

== Townships ==
=== Clark County, Missouri ===
- Clay
- Des Moines
- Folker
- Grant
- Jackson
- Jefferson
- Lincoln
- Madison
- Sweet Home
- Union
- Vernon
- Washington
- Wyaconda

=== Hancock County, Illinois ===
- Appanoose
- Augusta
- Bear Creek
- Carthage
- Chili
- Dallas City
- Durham
- Fountain Green
- Hancock
- Harmony
- La Harpe
- Montebello
- Nauvoo
- Pilot Grove
- Pontoosuc
- Prairie
- Rock Creek
- Rocky Run
- Sonora
- St. Albans
- St. Mary
- Walker
- Warsaw
- Wilcox
- Wythe

=== Lee County, Iowa ===
- Cedar
- Charleston
- Denmark
- Des Moines
- Franklin
- Green Bay
- Harrison
- Jackson
- Jefferson
- Madison
- Marion
- Montrose
- Pleasant Ridge
- Van Buren
- Washington
- West Point

== Demographics ==
As of the census of 2000, there were 45,468 people, 18,127 households, and 12,327 families residing within the μSA. The racial makeup of the μSA was 94.99% White, 2.36% African American, 0.25% Native American, 0.34% Asian, 0.05% Pacific Islander, 0.90% from other races, and 1.11% from two or more races. Hispanic or Latino of any race were 2.10% of the population.

The median income for a household in the μSA was $32,825, and the median income for a family was $39,464. Males had a median income of $29,783 versus $20,869 for females. The per capita income for the μSA was $17,209.

== See also ==
- Illinois statistical areas
- Iowa census statistical areas
- List of metropolitan areas of the United States
- Missouri census statistical areas
