= St. Mary, Illinois =

- Unincorporated community
- Location within Illinois Location within the United States
- Coordinates: 40°20′46″N 90°56′02″W
- Country: United States
- State: Illinois
- County: Hancock
- Elevation: 571 ft (174 m)
- Time zone: UTC-6 (Central (CST))
  - Summer (DST): UTC-5 (CDT)
- Area code: 217
- GNIS feature ID: 417530

St. Mary is an unincorporated community in St. Mary's Township, Hancock County, Illinois, United States. The community is located along County Route 6 3.9 miles (6.3 km) north of Plymouth.
