= Hancock County, Illinois =

County in Illinois, United States

- County
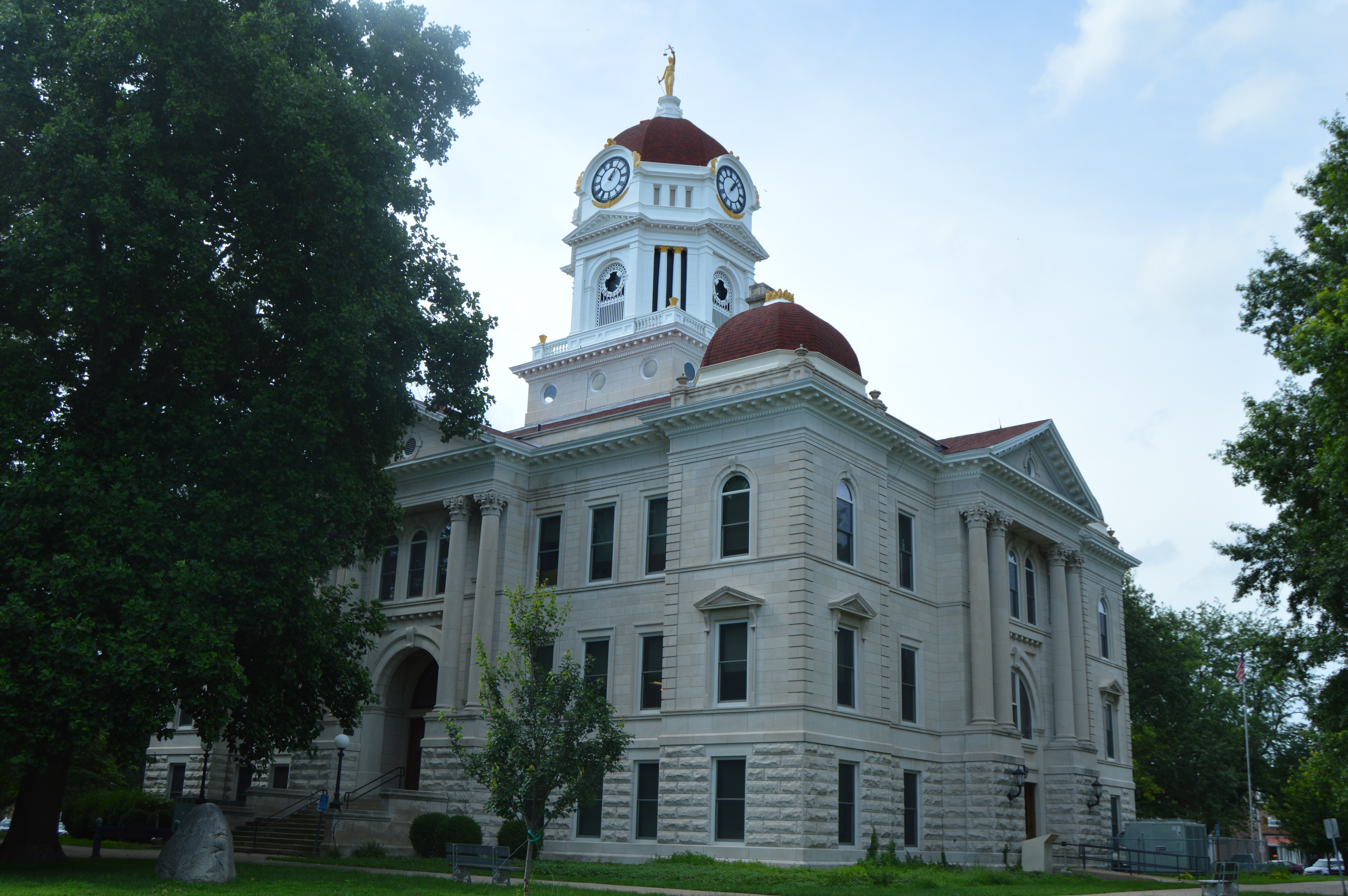
- Hancock County Courthouse in Carthage

- Location within the U.S. state of Illinois
- Coordinates: 40°24′N 91°10′W
- Country: United States
- State: Illinois
- Founded: 1825
- Named for: John Hancock
- Seat: Carthage
- Largest city: Hamilton

Area
  - Total: 814 sq mi (2,110 km^{2})
  - Land: 794 sq mi (2,060 km^{2})
  - Water: 21 sq mi (54 km^{2}) 2.5%

Population (2020)
  - Total: 17,620
  - Estimate (2025): 16,803 ▼
  - Density: 22.2/sq mi (8.57/km^{2})
- Time zone: UTC−6 (Central)
  - Summer (DST): UTC−5 (CDT)
- Congressional district: 15th
- Website: www.hancockcounty-il.gov

Hancock County is a county in the U.S. state of Illinois. According to the 2020 census, it has a population of 17,620. Its county seat is Carthage, and its largest city is Hamilton. The county is composed of rural towns with many farmers.

Hancock County is part of the Fort Madison-Keokuk, IA-IL-MO Micropolitan Statistical Area.

== History ==
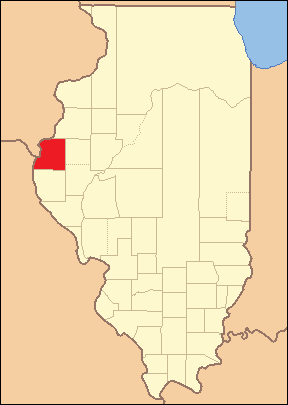
Hancock County at the time of its creation in 1825

Hancock County was part of the "Military Tract" set aside by Congress to reward veterans of the War of 1812. Actual settlement of the interior of the county was delayed by concerns about hostile American Indians. After their defeat in the Blackhawk War in 1832, settlement proceeded quickly.

Hancock County was formed, on January 13, 1825, out of Pike County. It was named in honor of John Hancock, who signed the Declaration of Independence.

For a brief period in the 1840s Hancock had one of Illinois' most populous cities: Nauvoo, which was then headquarters for the Church of Jesus Christ of Latter Day Saints. The movement's founder Joseph Smith was killed in the county seat of Carthage in 1844. Most Mormons left Hancock County in the 1840s. Today, Latter Day Saints come in increasing numbers to important Latter Day Saint sites in Hancock County, partly for vacation and partly for religious pilgrimage.

The original courthouse was at Montebello. Montebello no longer exists but was between Nauvoo and Hamilton. In 1833 the state commissioned the formation of the county seat at Carthage, which was centrally located but not well developed. A log cabin was built to serve as the courthouse and served that purpose until 1839 when the second Carthage Courthouse was built. The original log cabin continued to serve as a school and other purposes until 1945 when it was removed.

The second courthouse cost $3,700 to build and served from 1839 until 1906. It served as a location for Stephen A. Douglas (October 11, 1858) and Abraham Lincoln (October 22, 1858) to speak to residents as they were running against each other for the US Senate. In 1906 it was removed to make room for the current courthouse.

The current courthouse was dedicated October 21, 1908.

=== Township organization ===
Hancock was one of 24 Illinois counties that moved immediately to adopt township government upon the adoption of the Illinois Constitution of 1848, which authorized township government, and the passage of the Township Organization Act by the 16th Illinois General Assembly in 1849. The county's voters approved township organization at the November 6, 1849 general election. The Illinois Secretary of State recognizes this as the date of establishment of Hancock County's original townships. However, the townships were not named and delineated until the following year.

The appointed commissioners filed their report on February 26, 1850, dividing the county into 19 townships. Elections for officers of these newly created townships were held on the first Tuesday of April 1850. The county's new Board of Supervisors, made up of each township's elected supervisor, convened for the first time on August 12, 1850.

In 1851, the state legislature passed a law that allowed a county's voters to vote at the annual township meeting to reverse the decision to adopt township organization. Hancock County was the only county in the state to vote to dissolve its townships under this law, which it did in April 1852 thanks to overwhelming anti-township majorities at the Warsaw and Carthage township meetings. The validity of this 1852 vote was challenged in the courts. The following year, the state legislature passed special legislation to allow Hancock County to hold a new referendum on township organization. The referendum passed in March 1853, reaffirming the county's shift to township government.

Later, in December 1853, the Illinois Supreme Court struck down the 1851 law in People v. Couchman. The Couchman decision confirmed that Hancock County had been continuously under township organization since 1850. It held the 1851 law unconstitutional because the law improperly allowed township organization to be reversed at a township meeting rather than a general election, and thus with less formality than had been required for the original decision to adopt townships. The decision also ended the county court's attempts to continue its governmental operations, which had persisted even after the March 1853 referendum.

A further vote on whether to dissolve Hancock County's townships was held in 1873. It failed by a three-to-one margin, carrying majorities only in Hancock and Carthage townships.

== Geography ==
According to the U.S. Census Bureau, the county has a total area of 814 square miles (2,110 km^{2}), of which 794 square miles (2,060 km^{2}) is land and 21 square miles (54 km^{2}) (2.5%) is water.

=== Climate and weather ===
Carthage, Illinois

Climate chart (precipitation, max. and min. temperature)
| J | F | M | A | M | J | J | A | S | O | N | D |
| 1.5 32 13 | 1.7 38 18 | 2.9 50 29 | 3.8 62 39 | 4.6 73 50 | 4.4 83 60 | 4.5 87 64 | 3.5 85 62 | 4 77 54 | 2.9 66 42 | 3.2 50 31 | 2.3 36 19 |
- █ Average max. and min. temperatures in °F
- █ Precipitation totals in inches
- Source: The Weather Channel
Metric conversion
| J | F | M | A | M | J | J | A | S | O | N | D |
| 37 0 −11 | 43 3 −8 | 73 10 −2 | 97 17 4 | 116 23 10 | 111 28 16 | 115 31 18 | 90 29 17 | 101 25 12 | 72 19 6 | 80 10 −1 | 58 2 −7 |
- █ Average max. and min. temperatures in °C
- █ Precipitation totals in mm

In recent years, average temperatures in the county seat of Carthage have ranged from a low of 13 °F (−11 °C) in January to a high of 87 °F (31 °C) in July, although a record low of −30 °F (−34 °C) was recorded in February 1905 and a record high of 113 °F (45 °C) was recorded in August 1934. Average monthly precipitation ranged from 1.47 inches (37 mm) in January to 4.58 inches (116 mm) in May.

=== Major highways ===
- US 136
- IL 9
- IL 61
- IL 94
- IL 96
- IL 110 (CKC)
- IL 336

=== Adjacent counties ===
- Lee County, Iowa - northwest
- Henderson County - northeast
- McDonough County - east
- Schuyler County - southeast
- Adams County - south
- Lewis County, Missouri - southwest
- Clark County, Missouri - west

== Demographics ==
Historical population
| Census | Pop. | Note | %± |
|---|---|---|---|
| 1830 | 483 | | — |
| 1840 | 9,946 | | 1,959.2% |
| 1850 | 14,652 | | 47.3% |
| 1860 | 29,061 | | 98.3% |
| 1870 | 35,935 | | 23.7% |
| 1880 | 35,337 | | −1.7% |
| 1890 | 31,907 | | −9.7% |
| 1900 | 32,215 | | 1.0% |
| 1910 | 30,638 | | −4.9% |
| 1920 | 28,523 | | −6.9% |
| 1930 | 26,420 | | −7.4% |
| 1940 | 26,297 | | −0.5% |
| 1950 | 25,790 | | −1.9% |
| 1960 | 24,574 | | −4.7% |
| 1970 | 23,645 | | −3.8% |
| 1980 | 23,877 | | 1.0% |
| 1990 | 21,373 | | −10.5% |
| 2000 | 20,121 | | −5.9% |
| 2010 | 19,104 | | −5.1% |
| 2020 | 17,620 | | −7.8% |
| 2025 (est.) | 16,803 | ▼ | −4.6% |
U.S. Decennial Census; 1790-1960 1900-1990; 1990-2000 2010-2013

2000 census age pyramid for Hancock County

=== 2020 census ===
As of the 2020 census, the county had a population of 17,620. The median age was 46.1 years. 21.3% of residents were under the age of 18 and 23.9% of residents were 65 years of age or older. For every 100 females there were 98.8 males, and for every 100 females age 18 and over there were 96.9 males age 18 and over.

The racial makeup of the county was 94.7% White, 0.4% Black or African American, 0.3% American Indian and Alaska Native, 0.3% Asian, <0.1% Native Hawaiian and Pacific Islander, 0.7% from some other race, and 3.6% from two or more races. Hispanic or Latino residents of any race comprised 1.8% of the population.

16.0% of residents lived in urban areas, while 84.0% lived in rural areas.

There were 7,556 households in the county, of which 25.8% had children under the age of 18 living in them. Of all households, 51.2% were married-couple households, 19.1% were households with a male householder and no spouse or partner present, and 23.4% were households with a female householder and no spouse or partner present. About 30.7% of all households were made up of individuals and 15.5% had someone living alone who was 65 years of age or older.

There were 8,952 housing units, of which 15.6% were vacant. Among occupied housing units, 80.8% were owner-occupied and 19.2% were renter-occupied. The homeowner vacancy rate was 2.6% and the rental vacancy rate was 14.7%.

=== Racial and ethnic composition ===
Hancock County, Illinois – Racial and ethnic composition Note: the US Census treats Hispanic/Latino as an ethnic category. This table excludes Latinos from the racial categories and assigns them to a separate category. Hispanics/Latinos may be of any race.
| Race / Ethnicity (NH = Non-Hispanic) | Pop 1980 | Pop 1990 | Pop 2000 | Pop 2010 | Pop 2020 | % 1980 | % 1990 | % 2000 | % 2010 | % 2020 |
|---|---|---|---|---|---|---|---|---|---|---|
| White alone (NH) | 23,638 | 21,230 | 19,780 | 18,611 | 16,599 | 99.00% | 99.33% | 98.31% | 97.42% | 94.21% |
| Black or African American alone (NH) | 54 | 26 | 38 | 51 | 73 | 0.23% | 0.12% | 0.19% | 0.27% | 0.41% |
| Native American or Alaska Native alone (NH) | 26 | 20 | 30 | 34 | 38 | 0.11% | 0.09% | 0.15% | 0.18% | 0.22% |
| Asian alone (NH) | 40 | 36 | 46 | 45 | 57 | 0.17% | 0.17% | 0.23% | 0.24% | 0.32% |
| Native Hawaiian or Pacific Islander alone (NH) | x | x | 5 | 11 | 4 | x | x | 0.02% | 0.06% | 0.02% |
| Other race alone (NH) | 22 | 3 | 9 | 12 | 29 | 0.09% | 0.01% | 0.04% | 0.06% | 0.16% |
| Mixed race or Multiracial (NH) | x | x | 108 | 155 | 502 | x | x | 0.54% | 0.81% | 2.85% |
| Hispanic or Latino (any race) | 97 | 58 | 105 | 185 | 318 | 0.41% | 0.27% | 0.52% | 0.97% | 1.80% |
| Total | 23,877 | 21,373 | 20,121 | 19,104 | 17,620 | 100.00% | 100.00% | 100.00% | 100.00% | 100.00% |

=== 2010 census ===
As of the 2010 United States census, there were 19,104 people, 8,040 households, and 5,427 families residing in the county. The population density was 24.1 inhabitants per square mile (9.3/km^{2}). There were 9,274 housing units at an average density of 11.7 per square mile (4.5/km^{2}). The racial makeup of the county was 98.0% white, 0.3% black or African American, 0.2% Asian, 0.2% American Indian, 0.1% Pacific islander, 0.3% from other races, and 0.9% from two or more races. Those of Hispanic or Latino origin made up 1.0% of the population. In terms of ancestry, 34.7% were German, 13.8% were English, 13.2% were American, and 12.1% were Irish.

Of the 8,040 households, 27.5% had children under the age of 18 living with them, 55.3% were married couples living together, 8.3% had a female householder with no husband present, 32.5% were non-families, and 28.2% of all households were made up of individuals. The average household size was 2.35 and the average family size was 2.85. The median age was 44.6 years.

The median income for a household in the county was $42,857 and the median income for a family was $55,162. Males had a median income of $41,609 versus $27,648 for females. The per capita income for the county was $22,885. About 8.9% of families and 12.6% of the population were below the poverty line, including 17.8% of those under age 18 and 9.9% of those age 65 or over.

== Politics ==
Hancock County is in Illinois's 15th Congressional District and is currently represented by Republican Mary Miller. For the Illinois House of Representatives, the county is in the 94th district and is represented by Republican Norine Hammond. The county is in the 47th district of the Illinois Senate, and is represented by Republican Jil Tracy.

In presidential elections, Hancock County usually favors Republican candidates, having voted for Democratic presidential candidates only four times during the period of 1940 to 2024 (in 1964, 1988, 1992, and 1996).

United States presidential election results for Hancock County, Illinois
| Year | Republican | | Democratic | | Third party(ies) | |
| Year | No. | % | No. | % | No. | % |
|---|---|---|---|---|---|---|
| 1892 | 3,393 | 41.79% | 4,132 | 50.89% | 595 | 7.33% |
| 1896 | 4,250 | 47.18% | 4,581 | 50.85% | 177 | 1.96% |
| 1900 | 3,907 | 44.70% | 4,657 | 53.28% | 177 | 2.02% |
| 1904 | 3,887 | 49.47% | 3,456 | 43.98% | 515 | 6.55% |
| 1908 | 3,781 | 45.47% | 4,260 | 51.23% | 274 | 3.30% |
| 1912 | 1,937 | 25.60% | 3,692 | 48.80% | 1,937 | 25.60% |
| 1916 | 6,472 | 43.95% | 7,711 | 52.36% | 543 | 3.69% |
| 1920 | 7,379 | 57.75% | 5,125 | 40.11% | 274 | 2.14% |
| 1924 | 6,678 | 51.83% | 5,189 | 40.27% | 1,018 | 7.90% |
| 1928 | 7,795 | 58.65% | 5,447 | 40.99% | 48 | 0.36% |
| 1932 | 4,789 | 34.87% | 8,808 | 64.13% | 137 | 1.00% |
| 1936 | 7,383 | 47.61% | 7,726 | 49.82% | 398 | 2.57% |
| 1940 | 9,108 | 57.06% | 6,688 | 41.90% | 165 | 1.03% |
| 1944 | 7,972 | 59.59% | 5,338 | 39.90% | 68 | 0.51% |
| 1948 | 7,098 | 55.54% | 5,559 | 43.50% | 122 | 0.95% |
| 1952 | 9,181 | 66.14% | 4,681 | 33.72% | 19 | 0.14% |
| 1956 | 8,431 | 63.41% | 4,854 | 36.50% | 12 | 0.09% |
| 1960 | 8,036 | 61.86% | 4,947 | 38.08% | 7 | 0.05% |
| 1964 | 5,557 | 47.27% | 6,199 | 52.73% | 0 | 0.00% |
| 1968 | 6,866 | 60.24% | 3,720 | 32.64% | 811 | 7.12% |
| 1972 | 7,519 | 67.56% | 3,592 | 32.28% | 18 | 0.16% |
| 1976 | 6,043 | 55.54% | 4,730 | 43.47% | 108 | 0.99% |
| 1980 | 6,597 | 62.32% | 3,522 | 33.27% | 466 | 4.40% |
| 1984 | 6,251 | 62.50% | 3,713 | 37.13% | 37 | 0.37% |
| 1988 | 4,568 | 48.71% | 4,740 | 50.54% | 70 | 0.75% |
| 1992 | 3,714 | 36.89% | 4,213 | 41.84% | 2,142 | 21.27% |
| 1996 | 3,961 | 43.16% | 4,001 | 43.59% | 1,216 | 13.25% |
| 2000 | 5,134 | 52.98% | 4,256 | 43.92% | 301 | 3.11% |
| 2004 | 5,837 | 58.97% | 3,975 | 40.16% | 87 | 0.88% |
| 2008 | 5,161 | 54.50% | 4,141 | 43.73% | 167 | 1.76% |
| 2012 | 5,271 | 57.85% | 3,650 | 40.06% | 190 | 2.09% |
| 2016 | 6,430 | 70.50% | 2,139 | 23.45% | 552 | 6.05% |
| 2020 | 6,906 | 73.44% | 2,315 | 24.62% | 182 | 1.94% |
| 2024 | 6,708 | 73.67% | 2,183 | 23.97% | 215 | 2.36% |

== Communities ==
=== Cities ===
- Carthage (seat)
- Dallas City (partly in Henderson County)
- Hamilton
- La Harpe
- Nauvoo
- Warsaw

=== Town ===
- Bentley

=== Villages ===
- Augusta
- Basco
- Bowen
- Elvaston
- Ferris
- Plymouth
- Pontoosuc
- West Point

=== Census-designated place ===
- Niota

=== Unincorporated communities ===
- Adrian
- Breckenridge
- Burnside
- Chili
- Colusa
- Denver
- Disco
- Durham
- Elderville
- Fountain Green
- Joetta
- La Crosse
- McCall
- Middle Creek
- Old Niota
- Powellton
- Saint Mary
- Stillwell
- Sutter
- Tioga
- Webster

=== Forts ===
- Fort Johnson
- Fort Edwards

=== Townships ===
Hancock County is divided into twenty-four townships:

- Appanoose
- Augusta
- Bear Creek
- Carthage
- Chili
- Dallas City
- Durham
- Fountain Green
- Hancock
- Harmony
- La Harpe
- Montebello
- Nauvoo
- Pilot Grove
- Pontoosuc
- Prairie
- Rock Creek
- Rocky Run-Wilcox
- St. Albans
- St. Mary
- Sonora
- Walker
- Warsaw
- Wythe

== Education ==
The following is a list of all school districts with any territory in Hancock County, no matter how slight, even if the schools and/or administrative headquarters are in other counties.

K-12:

- Community Unit School District 4
- Hamilton Community Consolidated School District 328
- Nauvoo-Colusa Community Unit School District 325 - A K-12 district, but it has an arrangement with Warsaw district where Nauvoo-Colusa sends its high schoolers to Warsaw while Warsaw sends its junior high school students to Nauvoo-Colusa
- Southeastern Community Unit School District 337
- Warsaw Community Unit School District 316 - A K-12 district, but it has an arrangement with Warsaw district where Warsaw sends its junior high school students to Nauvoo-Colusa while Nauvoo-Colusa sends its high schoolers to Warsaw
- West Prairie Community Unit School District 103

Secondary:

- Illini West High School District 307

Elementary:

- Carthage Elementary School District 317
- Dallas Elementary School District 327
- La Harpe Community School District 347

== See also ==
- National Register of Historic Places listings in Hancock County, Illinois
