= Elderville =

Elderville may refer to:

- Elderville, Illinois, an unincorporated community in Hancock County, Illinois
- Elderville, Texas, an unincorporated community in Gregg County, Texas
