= St. Albans Township =

St. Albans Township Township may refer to the following townships in the United States:

- St. Albans Township, Hancock County, Illinois
- St. Albans Township, Licking County, Ohio
