= Appanoose Township, Hancock County, Illinois =

Appanoose Township
- Township
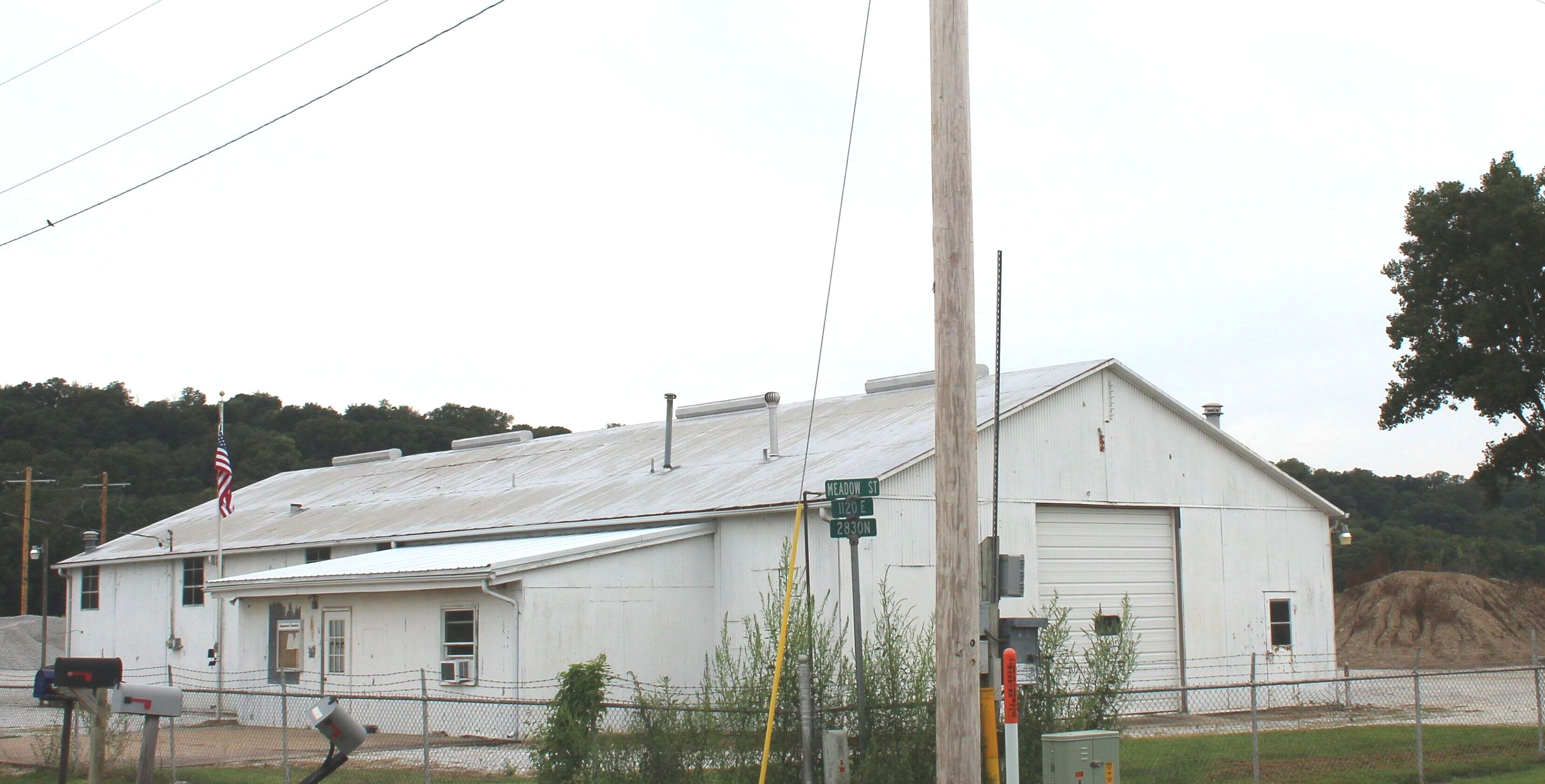
- Township building in Niota

- Location in Hancock County

- Hancock County's location in Illinois
- Coordinates: 40°35′25″N 91°17′55″W
- Country: United States
- State: Illinois
- County: Hancock
- Established: November 6, 1849

Area
  - Total: 30.34 sq mi (78.6 km^{2})
  - Land: 25.52 sq mi (66.1 km^{2})
  - Water: 4.82 sq mi (12.5 km^{2}) 15.88%
- Elevation: 686 ft (209 m)

Population (2020)
  - Total: 447
  - Density: 17.5/sq mi (6.76/km^{2})
- Time zone: UTC-6 (CST)
  - Summer (DST): UTC-5 (CDT)
- ZIP codes: 62330, 62354, 62358
- FIPS code: 17-067-01621

Appanoose Township is one of twenty-four townships in Hancock County, Illinois, USA. As of the 2020 census, its population was 447 and it contained 236 housing units.

== History ==
Appanoose Township takes its name from the Meskwaki leader Appanoose, via a paper town of the same name that was platted in the township in 1836. If it had ever been built, the town of Appanoose would have been on the Mississippi River, about two miles northeast of present-day Niota.

The township is one of the original 19 townships of Hancock County, and received its boundaries and name in a report submitted to the county commissioners in February 1850. The first township officers were elected on April 2, 1850.

== Geography ==
According to the 2021 census gazetteer files, Appanoose Township has a total area of 30.34 square miles (78.58 km^{2}), of which 25.52 square miles (66.10 km^{2}) (or 84.12%) is land and 4.82 square miles (12.48 km^{2}) (or 15.88%) is water.

=== Unincorporated towns ===
- Niota at 40.617542°N 91.287928°W
- Old Niota at 40.613375°N 91.302095°W

(This list is based on USGS data and may include former settlements.)

=== Cemeteries ===
The township contains Appanoose Cemetery.

=== Major highways ===
- Illinois Route 9
- Illinois Route 96

=== Airports and landing strips ===
- Sineles Sunset Strip
- Winchester Airport

== Demographics ==
Historical population
Census	Pop.	Note	%±
1860	835		—
1870	1,018		21.9%
1880	846		−16.9%
1890	800		−5.4%
1900	837		4.6%
1910	722		−13.7%
1920	661		−8.4%
1930	713		7.9%
1940	738		3.5%
1950	717		−2.8%
1960	658		−8.2%
1970	734		11.6%
1980	730		−0.5%
1990	672		−7.9%
2000	350		−47.9%
2010	435		24.3%
2020	447		2.8%
U.S. Decennial Census

As of the 2020 census there were 447 people, 152 households, and 120 families residing in the township. The population density was 14.74 inhabitants per square mile (5.69/km^{2}). There were 236 housing units at an average density of 7.78 per square mile (3.00/km^{2}). The racial makeup of the township was 93.06% White, 2.46% African American, 0.00% Native American, 0.22% Asian, 0.00% Pacific Islander, 0.22% from other races, and 4.03% from two or more races. Hispanic or Latino of any race were 0.89% of the population.

There were 152 households, out of which 27.60% had children under the age of 18 living with them, 75.66% were married couples living together, 3.29% had a female householder with no spouse present, and 21.05% were non-families. 21.10% of all households were made up of individuals, and 17.80% had someone living alone who was 65 years of age or older. The average household size was 2.07 and the average family size was 2.36.

The township's age distribution consisted of 17.5% under the age of 18, 0.6% from 18 to 24, 5.1% from 25 to 44, 47% from 45 to 64, and 29.8% who were 65 years of age or older. The median age was 58.8 years. For every 100 females, there were 98.1 males. For every 100 females age 18 and over, there were 101.6 males.

The median income for a household in the township was $49,103, and the median income for a family was $53,500. Males had a median income of $36,389 versus $22,500 for females. The per capita income for the township was $27,071. About 4.2% of families and 7.0% of the population were below the poverty line, including 7.3% of those under age 18 and 8.5% of those age 65 or over.

== School districts ==
Almost all of the township is in the Nauvoo-Colusa Community Unit School District 325. All small segment is in Dallas Elementary School District 327 and Illini West High School District 307.

== Political districts ==
- Illinois's 17th congressional district
- State House District 94
- State Senate District 47
