= Sutton, Illinois =

Sutton, Illinois may refer to:

- Bentley, Illinois, formerly known as Sutton
- Sutton, Cook County, Illinois, an unincorporated community in Cook County
