= Appanoose Township =

Appanoose Township may refer to the following townships in the United States:

- Appanoose Township, Hancock County, Illinois
- Appanoose Township, Franklin County, Kansas
