= Harmony Township, Hancock County, Illinois =

Harmony Township
- Township

- Location in Hancock County

- Hancock County's location in Illinois
- Coordinates: 40°19′48″N 91°04′53″W
- Country: United States
- State: Illinois
- County: Hancock
- Established: September 12, 1854

Area
  - Total: 37.58 sq mi (97.3 km^{2})
  - Land: 37.58 sq mi (97.3 km^{2})
  - Water: 0.01 sq mi (0.026 km^{2}) 0.02%
- Elevation: 666 ft (203 m)

Population (2020)
  - Total: 288
  - Density: 7.66/sq mi (2.96/km^{2})
- Time zone: UTC-6 (CST)
  - Summer (DST): UTC-5 (CDT)
- ZIP codes: 62316, 62321, 62367
- FIPS code: 17-067-32993

Harmony Township is one of twenty-four townships in Hancock County, Illinois, USA. As of the 2020 census, its population was 288 and it contained 153 housing units. It was formed from Carthage and Chili townships on September 12, 1854.

== Geography ==
According to the 2021 census gazetteer files, Harmony Township has a total area of 37.58 square miles (97.33 km^{2}), of which 37.58 square miles (97.33 km^{2}) (or 99.98%) is land and 0.01 square miles (0.03 km^{2}) (or 0.02%) is water.

=== Cities, towns, villages ===
- Bentley

=== Unincorporated towns ===
- Denver at 40.290601°N 91.107084°W

(This list is based on USGS data and may include former settlements.)

=== Cemeteries ===
The township contains these seven cemeteries: Browning, Denver, Harmony, Immanuel Lutheran, Mount Pleasant, Ramsey and Scott.

=== Major highways ===
- Illinois Route 94

=== Airports and landing strips ===
- Mabry Landing Strip
- McPherson Airport

== Demographics ==
Historical population
Census	Pop.	Note	%±
1860	846		—
1870	1,457		72.2%
1880	1,248		−14.3%
1890	1,011		−19.0%
1900	1,006		−0.5%
1910	938		−6.8%
1920	924		−1.5%
1930	836		−9.5%
1940	826		−1.2%
1950	716		−13.3%
1960	630		−12.0%
1970	576		−8.6%
1980	485		−15.8%
1990	413		−14.8%
2000	421		1.9%
2010	326		−22.6%
2020	288		−11.7%
U.S. Decennial Census

As of the 2020 census there were 288 people, 133 households, and 112 families residing in the township. The population density was 7.66 inhabitants per square mile (2.96/km^{2}). There were 153 housing units at an average density of 4.07 per square mile (1.57/km^{2}). The racial makeup of the township was 97.22% White, 0.00% African American, 0.35% Native American, 0.00% Asian, 0.00% Pacific Islander, 0.00% from other races, and 2.43% from two or more races. Hispanic or Latino of any race were 2.08% of the population.

There were 133 households, out of which 24.80% had children under the age of 18 living with them, 78.20% were married couples living together, 6.02% had a female householder with no spouse present, and 15.79% were non-families. 7.50% of all households were made up of individuals, and 7.50% had someone living alone who was 65 years of age or older. The average household size was 2.62 and the average family size was 2.83.

The township's age distribution consisted of 18.6% under the age of 18, 7.7% from 18 to 24, 8.3% from 25 to 44, 36.4% from 45 to 64, and 28.9% who were 65 years of age or older. The median age was 49.7 years. For every 100 females, there were 90.7 males. For every 100 females age 18 and over, there were 79.7 males.

The median income for a household in the township was $69,219. Males had a median income of $39,881 versus $12,200 for females. The per capita income for the township was $45,001. About 8.9% of families and 7.4% of the population were below the poverty line, including 13.8% of those under age 18 and 0.0% of those age 65 or over.

== School districts ==
- Carthage Elementary School District #317
- Illini West High School District #307

== Political districts ==
- Illinois's 18th congressional district
- State House District 94
- State Senate District 47
