= La Harpe Township, Hancock County, Illinois =

La Harpe Township
- Township
- Township building in La Harpe

- Location in Hancock County

- Hancock County's location in Illinois
- Coordinates: 40°35′34″N 90°57′50″W
- Country: United States
- State: Illinois
- County: Hancock
- Established: November 6, 1849

Area
  - Total: 37.31 sq mi (96.6 km^{2})
  - Land: 37.31 sq mi (96.6 km^{2})
  - Water: 0 sq mi (0 km^{2}) 0%
- Elevation: 679 ft (207 m)

Population (2020)
  - Total: 1,377
  - Density: 36.91/sq mi (14.25/km^{2})
- Time zone: UTC-6 (CST)
  - Summer (DST): UTC-5 (CDT)
- ZIP codes: 61420, 61450, 62330
- FIPS code: 17-067-40845

La Harpe Township is one of twenty-four townships in Hancock County, Illinois, USA. As of the 2020 census, its population was 1,377 and it contained 673 housing units.

La Harpe Township was named for Jean-Baptiste Bénard de la Harpe, a French explorer.

== Geography ==
According to the 2021 census gazetteer files, La Harpe Township has a total area of 37.31 square miles (96.63 km^{2}), all land.

=== Cities, towns, villages ===
- La Harpe

=== Unincorporated towns ===
- Disco at 40.620319°N 91.021252°W

(This list is based on USGS data and may include former settlements.)

=== Cemeteries ===
The township contains LaHarpe City Cemetery.

=== Major highways ===
- Illinois Route 9
- Illinois Route 94

=== Airports and landing strips ===
- Housewright Airport

=== Landmarks ===
- Mayor Memorial Park

== Demographics ==
Historical population
Census	Pop.	Note	%±
1860	1,524		—
1870	1,741		14.2%
1880	1,899		9.1%
1890	1,865		−1.8%
1900	2,324		24.6%
1910	1,990		−14.4%
1920	1,949		−2.1%
1930	1,728		−11.3%
1940	1,841		6.5%
1950	1,801		−2.2%
1960	1,793		−0.4%
1970	1,701		−5.1%
1980	1,821		7.1%
1990	1,686		−7.4%
2000	1,653		−2.0%
2010	1,473		−10.9%
2020	1,377		−6.5%
U.S. Decennial Census

As of the 2020 census there were 1,377 people, 752 households, and 463 families residing in the township. The population density was 36.91 inhabitants per square mile (14.25/km^{2}). There were 673 housing units at an average density of 18.04 per square mile (6.97/km^{2}). The racial makeup of the township was 97.17% White, 0.44% African American, 0.07% Native American, 0.07% Asian, 0.00% Pacific Islander, 0.15% from other races, and 2.11% from two or more races. Hispanic or Latino of any race were 0.94% of the population.

There were 752 households, out of which 17.20% had children under the age of 18 living with them, 54.39% were married couples living together, 6.38% had a female householder with no spouse present, and 38.43% were non-families. 38.20% of all households were made up of individuals, and 25.00% had someone living alone who was 65 years of age or older. The average household size was 2.08 and the average family size was 2.75.

The township's age distribution consisted of 17.2% under the age of 18, 6.8% from 18 to 24, 19.8% from 25 to 44, 25.9% from 45 to 64, and 30.2% who were 65 years of age or older. The median age was 53.4 years. For every 100 females, there were 91.2 males. For every 100 females age 18 and over, there were 84.4 males.

The median income for a household in the township was $43,636, and the median income for a family was $67,083. Males had a median income of $51,273 versus $23,125 for females. The per capita income for the township was $28,706. About 7.3% of families and 9.8% of the population were below the poverty line, including 26.8% of those under age 18 and 2.6% of those age 65 or over.

== School districts ==
LaHarpe Community School District 347, grades K-8, & Illini West High School District 307

== Political districts ==
- Illinois's 18th congressional district
- State House District 94
- State Senate District 47
