= Augusta Township, Hancock County, Illinois =

Augusta Township
- Township
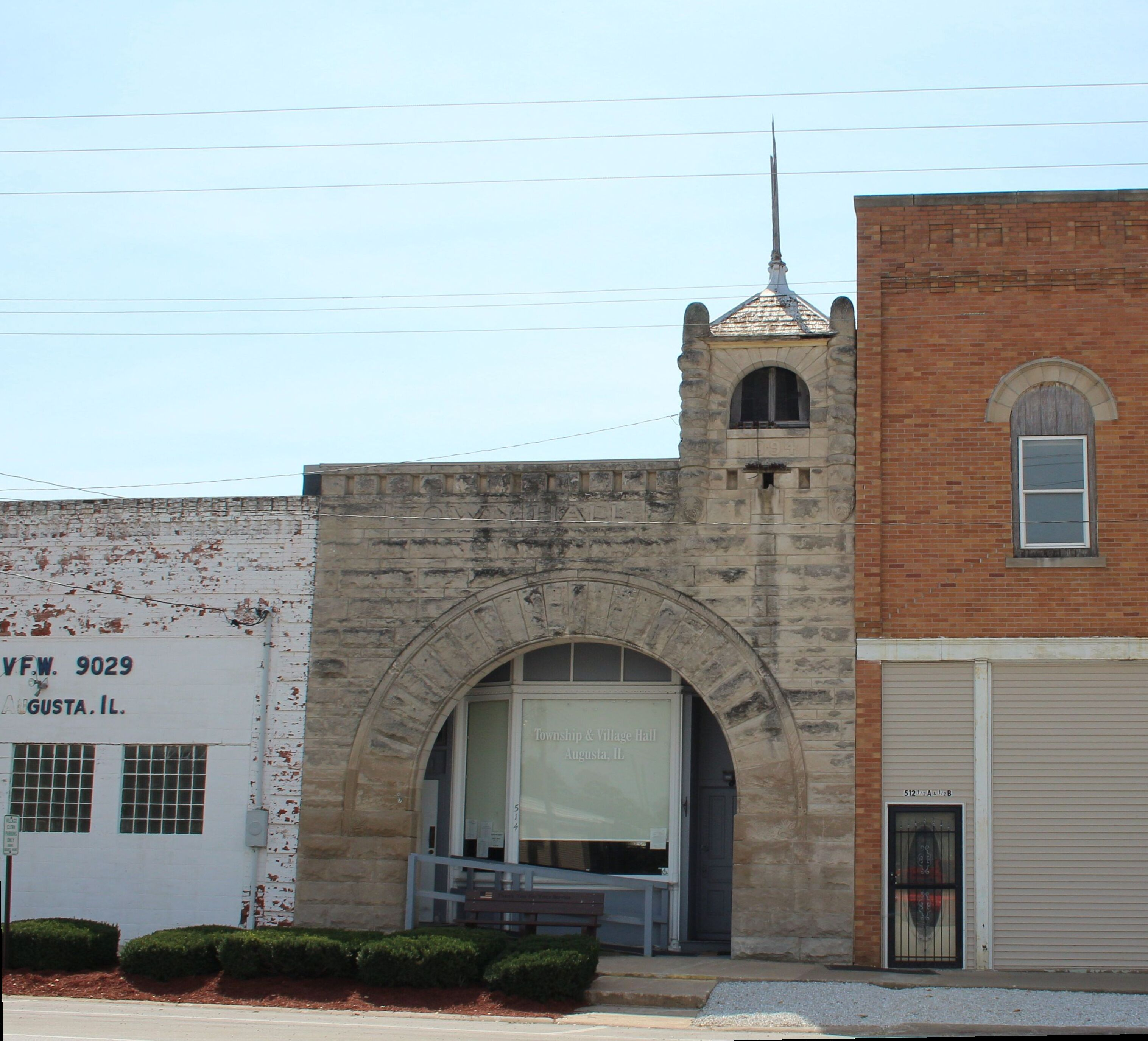
- Combined township and village hall in Augusta

- Location in Hancock County

- Hancock County's location in Illinois
- Coordinates: 40°13′58″N 90°58′18″W
- Country: United States
- State: Illinois
- County: Hancock
- Established: November 6, 1849

Area
  - Total: 37.93 sq mi (98.2 km^{2})
  - Land: 37.87 sq mi (98.1 km^{2})
  - Water: 0.05 sq mi (0.13 km^{2}) 0.14%
- Elevation: 673 ft (205 m)

Population (2020)
  - Total: 723
  - Density: 19.1/sq mi (7.37/km^{2})
- Time zone: UTC-6 (CST)
  - Summer (DST): UTC-5 (CDT)
- ZIP codes: 62311, 62316, 62367
- FIPS code: 17-067-02999

Augusta Township is one of twenty-four townships in Hancock County, Illinois, USA. As of the 2020 census, its population was 723 and it contained 364 housing units.

== Geography ==
According to the 2021 census gazetteer files, Augusta Township has a total area of 37.93 square miles (98.24 km^{2}), of which 37.87 square miles (98.08 km^{2}) (or 99.86%) is land and 0.05 square miles (0.13 km^{2}) (or 0.14%) is water.

=== Cities, towns, villages ===
- Augusta
- Plymouth (partial)

=== Unincorporated towns ===
- Pulaski at 40.202546°N 90.941245°W

(This list is based on USGS data and may include former settlements.)

=== Cemeteries ===
The township contains these four cemeteries: Old Augusta, Pulaski, Trimble and Woodland City.

=== Major highways ===
- Illinois Route 61
- Illinois Route 101

=== Lakes ===
- Augusta Lake

=== Landmarks ===
- Community Park
- Fairground

== Demographics ==
Historical population
Census	Pop.	Note	%±
1860	1,679		—
1870	1,992		18.6%
1880	1,893		−5.0%
1890	1,847		−2.4%
1900	1,923		4.1%
1910	1,889		−1.8%
1920	1,750		−7.4%
1930	1,595		−8.9%
1940	1,479		−7.3%
1950	1,384		−6.4%
1960	1,271		−8.2%
1970	1,112		−12.5%
1980	997		−10.3%
1990	867		−13.0%
2000	923		6.5%
2010	795		−13.9%
2020	723		−9.1%
U.S. Decennial Census

As of the 2020 census there were 723 people, 341 households, and 168 families residing in the township. The population density was 19.06 inhabitants per square mile (7.36/km^{2}). There were 364 housing units at an average density of 9.60 per square mile (3.71/km^{2}). The racial makeup of the township was 95.57% White, 0.28% African American, 0.14% Native American, 0.00% Asian, 0.00% Pacific Islander, 0.28% from other races, and 3.73% from two or more races. Hispanic or Latino of any race were 0.41% of the population.

There were 341 households, out of which 16.40% had children under the age of 18 living with them, 43.40% were married couples living together, 4.40% had a female householder with no spouse present, and 50.73% were non-families. 45.50% of all households were made up of individuals, and 15.80% had someone living alone who was 65 years of age or older. The average household size was 2.18 and the average family size was 3.10.

The township's age distribution consisted of 21.2% under the age of 18, 7.5% from 18 to 24, 24.6% from 25 to 44, 29.4% from 45 to 64, and 17.3% who were 65 years of age or older. The median age was 40.7 years. For every 100 females, there were 107.8 males. For every 100 females age 18 and over, there were 92.4 males.

The median income for a household in the township was $38,984, and the median income for a family was $68,125. Males had a median income of $43,194 versus $29,688 for females. The per capita income for the township was $22,474. About 4.8% of families and 12.8% of the population were below the poverty line, including 8.6% of those under age 18 and 2.3% of those age 65 or over.

== School districts ==
- Southeastern Community Unit School District 337

== Political districts ==
- Illinois's 17th congressional district
- State House District 93
- State Senate District 47
