= Rock Creek Township, Hancock County, Illinois =

Rock Creek Township
- Township
- Township building in Adrian

- Location in Hancock County

- Hancock County's location in Illinois
- Coordinates: 40°29′54″N 91°11′15″W
- Country: United States
- State: Illinois
- County: Hancock
- Established: April 27, 1855

Area
  - Total: 35.97 sq mi (93.2 km^{2})
  - Land: 35.97 sq mi (93.2 km^{2})
  - Water: 0 sq mi (0 km^{2}) 0%
- Elevation: 696 ft (212 m)

Population (2020)
  - Total: 322
  - Density: 8.95/sq mi (3.46/km^{2})
- Time zone: UTC-6 (CST)
  - Summer (DST): UTC-5 (CDT)
- ZIP codes: 62318, 62321, 62336, 62341, 62358
- FIPS code: 17-067-64876

Rock Creek Township is one of twenty-four townships in Hancock County, Illinois, United States. As of the 2020 census, its population was 322 and it contained 155 housing units. It was formed from Sonora and Pilot Grove townships on April 27, 1855.

== Geography ==
According to the 2021 census gazetteer files, Rock Creek Township has a total area of 35.97 square miles (93.16 km^{2}), all land.

=== Cities, towns, villages ===
- Ferris (vast majority)

=== Unincorporated towns ===
- Adrian at 40.520877°N 91.16709°W

(This list is based on USGS data and may include former settlements.)

=== Cemeteries ===
The township contains Rock Creek Cemetery.

Many of the old gravestones are no longer legible. A large stone designating Rock Creek Cemetery has the names of descendants on its back.

== Demographics ==
Historical population
Census	Pop.	Note	%±
1860	512		—
1870	1,201		134.6%
1880	1,444		20.2%
1890	1,217		−15.7%
1900	1,110		−8.8%
1910	1,128		1.6%
1920	1,061		−5.9%
1930	974		−8.2%
1940	923		−5.2%
1950	795		−13.9%
1960	740		−6.9%
1970	610		−17.6%
1980	525		−13.9%
1990	431		−17.9%
2000	383		−11.1%
2010	350		−8.6%
2020	322		−8.0%
U.S. Decennial Census

As of the 2020 census there were 322 people, 149 households, and 83 families residing in the township. The population density was 8.95 inhabitants per square mile (3.46/km^{2}). There were 155 housing units at an average density of 4.31 per square mile (1.66/km^{2}). The racial makeup of the township was 90.99% White, 0.62% African American, 0.62% Native American, 0.00% Asian, 0.00% Pacific Islander, 2.80% from other races, and 4.97% from two or more races. Hispanic or Latino of any race were 3.42% of the population.

There were 149 households, out of which 16.80% had children under the age of 18 living with them, 50.34% were married couples living together, 0.67% had a female householder with no spouse present, and 44.30% were non-families. 44.30% of all households were made up of individuals, and 21.50% had someone living alone who was 65 years of age or older. The average household size was 2.10 and the average family size was 2.94.

The township's age distribution consisted of 15.3% under the age of 18, 2.2% from 18 to 24, 14.7% from 25 to 44, 32.9% from 45 to 64, and 34.8% who were 65 years of age or older. The median age was 55.9 years. For every 100 females, there were 98.1 males. For every 100 females age 18 and over, there were 84.0 males.

The median income for a household in the township was $41,339, and the median income for a family was $78,068. Males had a median income of $48,750 versus $26,000 for females. The per capita income for the township was $30,018. About 7.2% of families and 15.7% of the population were below the poverty line, including 29.2% of those under age 18 and 27.5% of those age 65 or over.

== School districts ==
The following school districts take portions of the township:

- One part is in Carthage Elementary School District 317 and Illini West High School District 307.
- A northern portion of the township is in Nauvoo-Colusa Community Unit School District 325
- A very small part in the southwest is in Hamilton Community Consolidated School District 328.

== Political districts ==
- Illinois's 17th congressional district
- State House District 94
- State Senate District 47
