= Dallas Elementary School District 327 =

Public elementary school district in Hancock County, Illinois

Dallas City Elementary School District #327

Address
- 921 Creamery Hill Dallas City, Illinois, 62330; United States
- Coordinates: 40°37′32″N 91°09′23″W

District information
- Grades: PreK–8
- Superintendent: Alissa Tucker
- NCES District ID: 1701388

Students and staff
- Students: 183 (2017–18)
- Athletic conference: Hancock County Conference
- District mascot: Bulldogs
- Colors: Red; Black; White

Other information
- Website: www.dcbulldogs.com

Dallas City Elementary School District #327 is a public school district headquartered in Dallas City, Illinois, which operates a single K–8 school. It previously operated Dallas City High School and was known as the Dallas City Community School District #336.

== History ==
In 2001 Dallas City High closed and was converted into the Great River Community Center; the city government installed additional parking in front of the former high school. The Dallas City area was reassigned to Nauvoo–Colusa Community Unit School District 325 for high school, so that year 70 students and all but two of the Dallas City High teachers moved to Nauvoo–Colusa High School. In 2007, students from the Dallas City area began attending the new Illini West High School in Carthage.

== Boundary ==
The district includes Dallas City and Pontoosuc, as well as Lomax. In Hancock County the district includes sections of Dallas City Township, Durham Township, and Pontoosuc Township. In Henderson County, the district includes much of Lomax Township.

== See also ==
- List of school districts in Illinois
