= Pilot Grove, Iowa =

- Unincorporated community
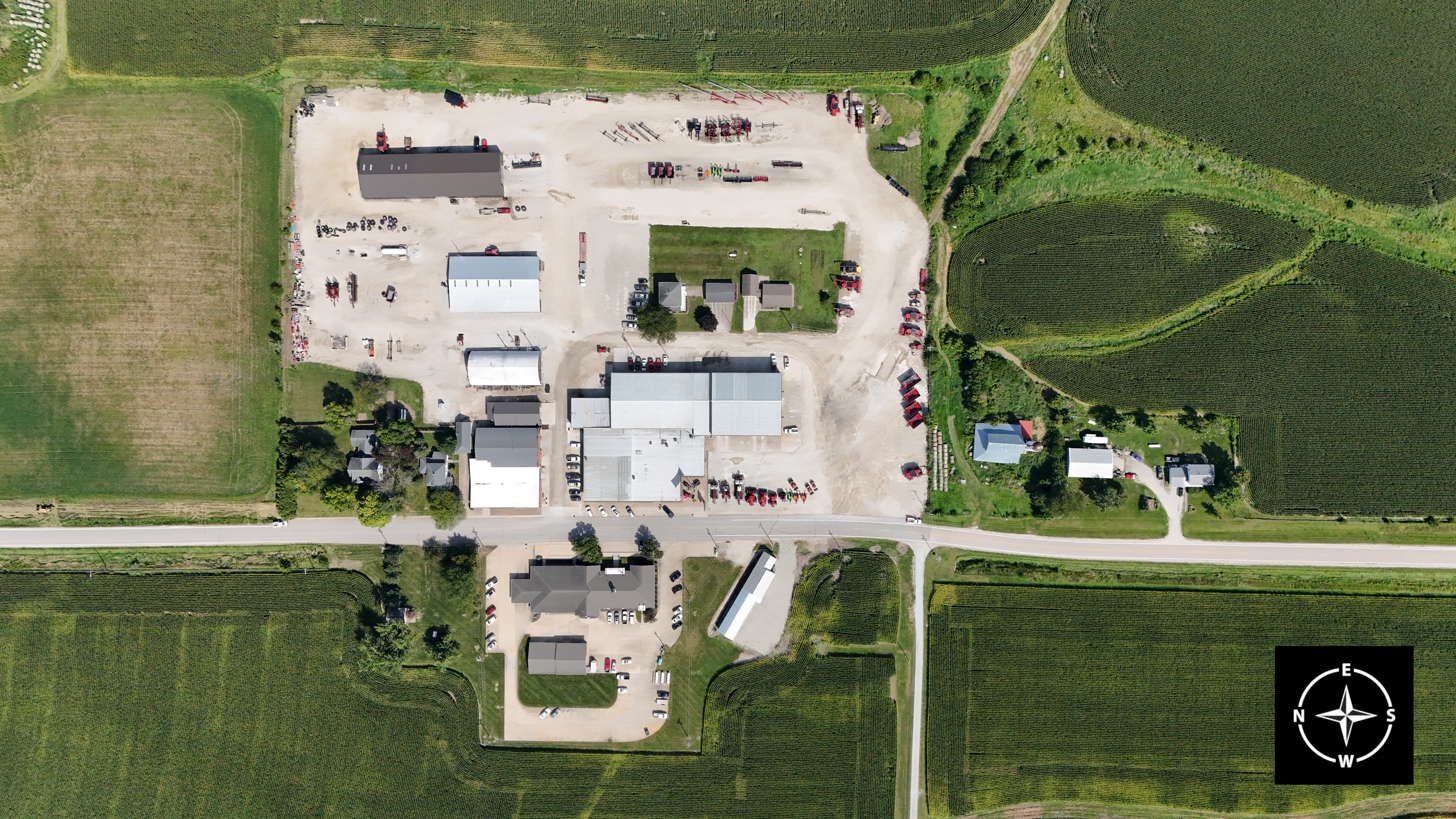
- An aerial view of Pilot Grove

- Location in Iowa Location in the United States
- Coordinates: 40°45′46″N 91°32′13″W
- Country: United States
- State: Iowa
- County: Lee
- Elevation: 646 ft (197 m)
- Time zone: UTC-6 (Central (CST))
  - Summer (DST): UTC-5 (CDT)
- ZIP codes: 52648
- GNIS feature ID: 460145

Pilot Grove is an unincorporated community in northern Lee County, Iowa, United States. It lies along local roads northwest of the city of Fort Madison, the county seat of Lee County.

== History ==
Although Pilot Grove is unincorporated, it has a post office, with the ZIP code of 52648, which opened on May 1, 1837. There has not always been a Pilot Grove post office since that date: it was discontinued on June 30, 1894, and when it was reestablished on August 7, 1895, it was under the name of Overton. The name was not restored to Pilot Grove until March 19, 1908.

Pilot Grove was laid out in 1858. Its population in 1925 was 65. The population was 65 in 1940.

Pilot Grove is part of the Fort Madison–Keokuk, IA-MO Micropolitan Statistical Area.
