= Pilot Grove Township, Hancock County, Illinois =

Pilot Grove Township
- Township
- Township building in Burnside

- Location in Hancock County

- Hancock County's location in Illinois
- Coordinates: 40°30′10″N 91°04′46″W
- Country: United States
- State: Illinois
- County: Hancock
- Established: November 6, 1849

Area
  - Total: 37.05 sq mi (96.0 km^{2})
  - Land: 36.97 sq mi (95.8 km^{2})
  - Water: 0.08 sq mi (0.21 km^{2}) 0.22%
- Elevation: 620 ft (190 m)

Population (2020)
  - Total: 282
  - Density: 7.63/sq mi (2.95/km^{2})
- Time zone: UTC-6 (CST)
  - Summer (DST): UTC-5 (CDT)
- ZIP codes: 61450, 62318, 62321
- FIPS code: 17-067-59845

Pilot Grove Township is one of twenty-four townships in Hancock County, Illinois, USA. As of the 2020 census, its population was 282 and it contained 121 housing units.

== Geography ==
According to the 2021 census gazetteer files, Pilot Grove Township has a total area of 37.05 square miles (95.96 km^{2}), of which 36.97 square miles (95.75 km^{2}) (or 99.78%) is land and 0.08 square miles (0.21 km^{2}) (or 0.22%) is water.

=== Unincorporated towns ===
- Burnside at 40.503932°N 91.100143°W

(This list is based on USGS data and may include former settlements.)

=== Cemeteries ===
The township contains these two cemeteries: McKay and Pilot Grove.

=== Major highways ===
- Illinois Route 94

=== Airports and landing strips ===
- Brooks Ranch Airport
- Lung RLA Airport

=== Lakes ===
- Linda Lake

== Demographics ==
Historical population
Census	Pop.	Note	%±
1860	1,121		—
1870	1,217		8.6%
1880	1,229		1.0%
1890	1,086		−11.6%
1900	1,010		−7.0%
1910	959		−5.0%
1920	889		−7.3%
1930	804		−9.6%
1940	731		−9.1%
1950	588		−19.6%
1960	611		3.9%
1970	468		−23.4%
1980	397		−15.2%
1990	339		−14.6%
2000	299		−11.8%
2010	280		−6.4%
2020	282		0.7%
U.S. Decennial Census

As of the 2020 census there were 282 people, 64 households, and 47 families residing in the township. The population density was 7.61 inhabitants per square mile (2.94/km^{2}). There were 121 housing units at an average density of 3.27 per square mile (1.26/km^{2}). The racial makeup of the township was 94.68% White, 0.00% African American, 0.00% Native American, 0.35% Asian, 0.00% Pacific Islander, 0.00% from other races, and 4.96% from two or more races. Hispanic or Latino of any race were 2.13% of the population.

There were 64 households, out of which 34.40% had children under the age of 18 living with them, 73.44% were married couples living together, none had a female householder with no spouse present, and 26.56% were non-families. 26.60% of all households were made up of individuals, and 9.40% had someone living alone who was 65 years of age or older. The average household size was 2.95 and the average family size was 3.51.

The township's age distribution consisted of 15.9% under the age of 18, 21.7% from 18 to 24, 26.4% from 25 to 44, 26.5% from 45 to 64, and 9.5% who were 65 years of age or older. The median age was 39.5 years. For every 100 females, there were 117.2 males. For every 100 females age 18 and over, there were 101.3 males.

The median income for a household in the township was $68,000, and the median income for a family was $69,250. Males had a median income of $50,455 versus $17,679 for females. The per capita income for the township was $24,842. About 25.5% of families and 11.6% of the population were below the poverty line, including 0.0% of those under age 18 and 66.7% of those age 65 or over.

== School districts ==
The following school districts take portions of the township:

- One part is in Carthage Elementary School District 317, while another part is in La Harpe Community School District 347. Both of these districts are within Illini West High School District 307.
- A southwest portion of the township is in Nauvoo-Colusa Community Unit School District 325

== Political districts ==
- Illinois's 18th congressional district
- State House District 94
- State Senate District 47
