= Hancock Township, Hancock County, Illinois =

Hancock Township
- Township
- Township building

- Location in Hancock County

- Hancock County's location in Illinois
- Coordinates: 40°24′59″N 90°57′58″W
- Country: United States
- State: Illinois
- County: Hancock
- Established: April 27, 1855

Area
  - Total: 38.15 sq mi (98.8 km^{2})
  - Land: 38.15 sq mi (98.8 km^{2})
  - Water: 0 sq mi (0 km^{2}) 0%
- Elevation: 554 ft (169 m)

Population (2020)
  - Total: 257
  - Density: 6.74/sq mi (2.60/km^{2})
- Time zone: UTC-6 (CST)
  - Summer (DST): UTC-5 (CDT)
- ZIP codes: 61420, 62321, 62326, 62367, 62374
- FIPS code: 17-067-32629

Hancock Township is one of twenty-four townships in Hancock County, Illinois, USA. As of the 2020 census, its population was 257 and it contained 119 housing units. It was formed from Fountain Green and St. Mary's townships on April 27, 1855.

== Geography ==
According to the 2021 census gazetteer files, Hancock Township has a total area of 38.15 square miles (98.81 km^{2}), all land.

=== Unincorporated towns ===
- Joetta at 40.433654°N 90.931525°W

(This list is based on USGS data and may include former settlements.)

=== Cemeteries ===
The township contains these five cemeteries: Liberty, Majorville, Oak Grove, Spangler and Yetter.

=== Major highways ===
- U.S. Route 136
- Illinois Route 336

== Demographics ==
Historical population
Census	Pop.	Note	%±
1860	720		—
1870	926		28.6%
1880	1,130		22.0%
1890	894		−20.9%
1900	926		3.6%
1910	769		−17.0%
1920	668		−13.1%
1930	616		−7.8%
1940	556		−9.7%
1950	505		−9.2%
1960	419		−17.0%
1970	303		−27.7%
1980	302		−0.3%
1990	255		−15.6%
2000	254		−0.4%
2010	255		0.4%
2020	257		0.8%
U.S. Decennial Census

As of the 2020 census there were 257 people, 80 households, and 35 families residing in the township. The population density was 6.74 inhabitants per square mile (2.60/km^{2}). There were 119 housing units at an average density of 3.12 per square mile (1.20/km^{2}). The racial makeup of the township was 98.44% White, 0.00% African American, 0.00% Native American, 0.78% Asian, 0.00% Pacific Islander, 0.00% from other races, and 0.78% from two or more races. Hispanic or Latino of any race were 0.00% of the population.

There were 80 households, out of which 12.50% had children under the age of 18 living with them, 35.00% were married couples living together, none had a female householder with no spouse present, and 56.25% were non-families. 56.30% of all households were made up of individuals, and 21.30% had someone living alone who was 65 years of age or older. The average household size was 1.84 and the average family size was 2.91.

The township's age distribution consisted of 6.1% under the age of 18, 6.1% from 18 to 24, 30.6% from 25 to 44, 34.7% from 45 to 64, and 22.4% who were 65 years of age or older. The median age was 54.3 years. For every 100 females, there were 234.1 males. For every 100 females age 18 and over, there were 213.6 males.

The median income for a household in the township was $46,625, and the median income for a family was $54,844. Males had a median income of $44,821 versus $16,875 for females. The per capita income for the township was $29,459. None of the population were below the poverty line.

== School districts ==
- LaHarpe Elementary School District #347 (North side of Township)
- Carthage Elementary School District #317 (Southwest side/ Central of Township)
- West Prairie Community Unit School District #103 (West side of Township)

== Political districts ==
- Illinois's 18th congressional district
- State House District 94
- State Senate District 47
