= Disco, Illinois =

- Unincorporated community
- Location within Illinois Location within the United States
- Coordinates: 40°37′13″N 91°01′17″W
- Country: United States
- State: Illinois
- County: Hancock
- Elevation: 667 ft (203 m)
- Time zone: UTC-6 (Central (CST))
  - Summer (DST): UTC-5 (CDT)
- Area code: 217
- GNIS feature ID: 407231

Disco is an unincorporated community in Durham and La Harpe Townships, Hancock County, Illinois, United States. Disco is 4 miles (6.4 km) northwest of La Harpe, and is on the Keokuk Junction Railway.

== History ==
While one source says the etymology is uncertain, another source says Disco was so named because the surrounding river valley is as flat as a discus.
