= Colusa, Illinois =

- Unincorporated community
- Location within Illinois Location within the United States
- Coordinates: 40°34′15″N 91°10′05″W
- Country: United States
- State: Illinois
- County: Hancock
- Township: Dallas City Township
- Elevation: 650 ft (200 m)
- Time zone: UTC-6 (Central (CST))
  - Summer (DST): UTC-5 (CDT)
- ZIP code: 62329
- Area code: 217
- GNIS feature ID: 406421

Colusa is an unincorporated community in Dallas City Township, Hancock County, Illinois, United States. Colusa is 5 miles (8.0 km) south of Dallas City. Colusa has a post office with ZIP code 62329.

== Education ==
Nauvoo-Colusa Community Unit School District 325 operates public elementary and junior high schools serving the community.

Prior to 2008 residents attended Nauvoo-Colusa High School. Since 2008 residents have attended Warsaw Community Unit School District 316's Warsaw High School.
