= Pontoosuc, Illinois =

- Village
- Location of Pontoosuc in Hancock County, Illinois.
- Coordinates: 40°37′34″N 91°12′38″W
- Country: United States
- State: Illinois
- County: Hancock

Area
  - Total: 2.07 sq mi (5.37 km^{2})
  - Land: 1.41 sq mi (3.64 km^{2})
  - Water: 0.67 sq mi (1.73 km^{2})
- Elevation: 528 ft (161 m)

Population (2020)
  - Total: 99
  - Density: 70.4/sq mi (27.19/km^{2})
- Time zone: UTC-6 (CST)
  - Summer (DST): UTC-5 (CDT)
- ZIP code: 62330 (Dallas City)
- Area code: 217
- FIPS code: 17-61080
- GNIS feature ID: 2398998

Pontoosuc is a village in Hancock County, Illinois, United States. The population was 99 at the 2020 census.

== Geography ==
Pontoosuc is located in northern Hancock County. It is bordered to the north by the Mississippi River, which forms the state border with Iowa, and to the east by Dallas City. Illinois Route 9 passes through the village, leading east into Dallas City and west 5 miles (8 km) to the Fort Madison Toll Bridge over the Mississippi. Illinois Route 96 passes through Pontoosuc concurrently with IL-9 but leads southwest 13 miles (21 km) to Nauvoo.

According to the 2021 census gazetteer files, Pontoosuc has a total area of 2.07 square miles (5.36 km^{2}), of which 1.41 square miles (3.65 km^{2}) (or 67.82%) is land and 0.67 square miles (1.74 km^{2}) (or 32.18%) is water.

== Demographics ==
Historical population
Census	Pop.	Note	%±
1880	266		—
1890	249		−6.4%
1900	299		20.1%
1910	285		−4.7%
1920	199		−30.2%
1930	143		−28.1%
1940	165		15.4%
1950	214		29.7%
1960	210		−1.9%
1970	226		7.6%
1980	261		15.5%
1990	264		1.1%
2000	171		−35.2%
2010	146		−14.6%
2020	99		−32.2%
U.S. Decennial Census

As of the 2020 census there were 99 people, 50 households, and 24 families residing in the village. The population density was 47.76 inhabitants per square mile (18.44/km^{2}). There were 99 housing units at an average density of 47.76 per square mile (18.44/km^{2}). The racial makeup of the village was 95.96% White, 1.01% African American, 0.00% Native American, 0.00% Asian, 0.00% Pacific Islander, 0.00% from other races, and 3.03% from two or more races. Hispanic or Latino of any race were 0.00% of the population.

There were 50 households, out of which 24.0% had children under the age of 18 living with them, 46.00% were married couples living together, 2.00% had a female householder with no husband present, and 52.00% were non-families. 46.00% of all households were made up of individuals, and 18.00% had someone living alone who was 65 years of age or older. The average household size was 3.33 and the average family size was 2.18.

The village's age distribution consisted of 28.4% under the age of 18, 0.0% from 18 to 24, 27.4% from 25 to 44, 21% from 45 to 64, and 22.9% who were 65 years of age or older. The median age was 35.8 years. For every 100 females, there were 98.2 males. For every 100 females age 18 and over, there were 90.2 males.

The median income for a household in the village was $42,500, and the median income for a family was $51,250. Males had a median income of $50,000 versus $28,958 for females. The per capita income for the village was $22,224. About 4.2% of families and 5.5% of the population were below the poverty line, including 9.7% of those under age 18 and 8.0% of those age 65 or over.

== Transportation ==
Amtrak’s Southwest Chief, which operates between Los Angeles and Chicago, passes through the town on BNSF tracks, but makes no stop. The nearest station is located in Fort Madison, 6 miles (9.7 km) to the west.

== Education ==
Residents are in Dallas Elementary School District 327 and Illini West High School District 307.

== See also ==
- USS Pontoosuc
