= Stillwell, Illinois =

Unincorporated community in Illinois, United States

- Unincorporated community
- Location within Illinois Location within the United States
- Coordinates: 40°13′07″N 91°10′59″W
- Country: United States
- State: Illinois
- County: Hancock County
- Township: St. Albans Township
- Elevation: 669 ft (204 m)
- ZIP code: 62380
- GNIS feature ID: 0419142

Stillwell is an unincorporated community in St. Albans Township, Hancock County, Illinois, United States. It is located about 5 minutes south of West Point, but in terms of postal delivery is usually considered part of West Point. The town currently has approximately 40 residents.
