= Montebello Township, Hancock County, Illinois =

Montebello Township
- Township
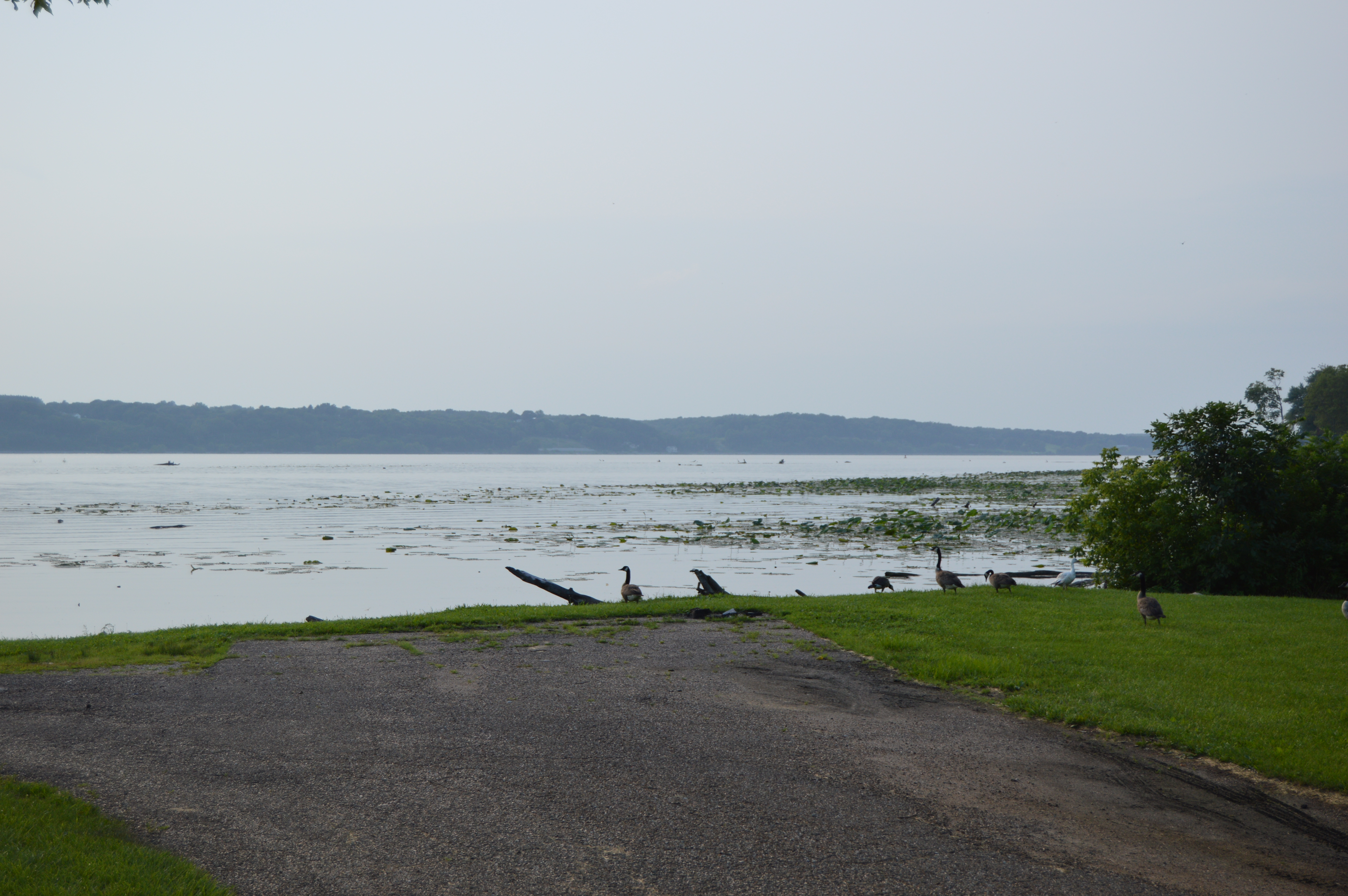
- Mississippi River picnic area

- Location in Hancock County

- Hancock County's location in Illinois
- Coordinates: 40°25′01″N 91°18′49″W
- Country: United States
- State: Illinois
- County: Hancock
- Established: November 6, 1849

Area
  - Total: 41.14 sq mi (106.6 km^{2})
  - Land: 36.76 sq mi (95.2 km^{2})
  - Water: 4.38 sq mi (11.3 km^{2}) 10.64%
- Elevation: 620 ft (190 m)

Population (2020)
  - Total: 3,341
  - Density: 90.89/sq mi (35.09/km^{2})
- Time zone: UTC-6 (CST)
  - Summer (DST): UTC-5 (CDT)
- ZIP codes: 62334, 62341, 62354, 62379
- FIPS code: 17-067-50140

Montebello Township is one of twenty-four townships in Hancock County, Illinois, USA. As of the 2020 census, its population was 3,341 and it contained 1,574 housing units.

== Geography ==
According to the 2021 census gazetteer files, Montebello Township has a total area of 41.14 square miles (106.55 km^{2}), of which 36.76 square miles (95.21 km^{2}) (or 89.36%) is land and 4.38 square miles (11.34 km^{2}) (or 10.64%) is water.

=== Cities, towns, villages ===
- Elvaston (partial)
- Hamilton

=== Cemeteries ===
The township contains these two cemeteries: Greenwood and Oakwood.

=== Major highways ===
- U.S. Route 136
- Illinois Route 96

=== Landmarks ===
- Wildcat Spring Park
- Vanished Town of Montebello Marker https://commons.wikimedia.org/wiki/File:Vanished_Montebello.jpg

== Demographics ==
Historical population
Census	Pop.	Note	%±
1860	694		—
1870	1,111		60.1%
1880	1,970		77.3%
1890	2,129		8.1%
1900	2,104		−1.2%
1910	2,324		10.5%
1920	2,402		3.4%
1930	2,345		−2.4%
1940	2,294		−2.2%
1950	2,404		4.8%
1960	2,837		18.0%
1970	3,379		19.1%
1980	4,141		22.6%
1990	3,929		−5.1%
2000	3,632		−7.6%
2010	3,579		−1.5%
2020	3,341		−6.6%
U.S. Decennial Census

As of the 2020 census there were 3,341 people, 1,349 households, and 856 families residing in the township. The population density was 81.21 inhabitants per square mile (31.36/km^{2}). There were 1,574 housing units at an average density of 38.26 per square mile (14.77/km^{2}). The racial makeup of the township was 93.89% White, 0.84% African American, 0.18% Native American, 0.60% Asian, 0.00% Pacific Islander, 0.90% from other races, and 3.59% from two or more races. Hispanic or Latino of any race were 1.71% of the population.

There were 1,349 households, out of which 28.70% had children under the age of 18 living with them, 50.85% were married couples living together, 9.34% had a female householder with no spouse present, and 36.55% were non-families. 29.50% of all households were made up of individuals, and 15.70% had someone living alone who was 65 years of age or older. The average household size was 2.41 and the average family size was 3.00.

The township's age distribution consisted of 20.7% under the age of 18, 8.7% from 18 to 24, 22.5% from 25 to 44, 27.7% from 45 to 64, and 20.5% who were 65 years of age or older. The median age was 44.3 years. For every 100 females, there were 85.6 males. For every 100 females age 18 and over, there were 89.9 males.

The median income for a household in the township was $53,015, and the median income for a family was $81,739. Males had a median income of $50,064 versus $29,042 for females. The per capita income for the township was $35,071. About 6.8% of families and 9.1% of the population were below the poverty line, including 20.2% of those under age 18 and 4.6% of those age 65 or over.

== School districts ==
- Hamilton Community Consolidated School District 328

== Political districts ==
- Illinois's 18th congressional district
- State House District 94
- State Senate District 47
