= Wythe Township, Hancock County, Illinois =

Wythe Township
- Township
- Township building in Elderville

- Location in Hancock County

- Hancock County's location in Illinois
- Coordinates: 40°19′23″N 91°18′12″W
- Country: United States
- State: Illinois
- County: Hancock
- Established: November 6, 1849

Area
  - Total: 38.1 sq mi (99 km^{2})
  - Land: 38.08 sq mi (98.6 km^{2})
  - Water: 0.02 sq mi (0.052 km^{2}) 0.04%
- Elevation: 660 ft (200 m)

Population (2020)
  - Total: 246
  - Density: 6.46/sq mi (2.49/km^{2})
- Time zone: UTC-6 (CST)
  - Summer (DST): UTC-5 (CDT)
- ZIP codes: 62313, 62341, 62379
- FIPS code: 17-067-83713

Wythe Township is one of twenty-four townships in Hancock County, Illinois, USA. As of the 2020 census, its population was 246 and it contained 117 housing units.

== Geography ==
According to the 2021 census gazetteer files, Wythe Township has a total area of 38.10 square miles (98.68 km^{2}), of which 38.08 square miles (98.63 km^{2}) (or 99.96%) is land and 0.02 square miles (0.05 km^{2}) (or 0.04%) is water.

=== Unincorporated towns ===
- Elderville at 40.330323°N 91.294592°W

(This list is based on USGS data and may include former settlements.)

=== Cemeteries ===
The township contains six cemeteries: Kiser, Oak Grove North, Oak Grove South, McGee, Wythe Congregational and Wythe Presbyterian.

=== Major highways ===
- Illinois Route 96

== Demographics ==
Historical population
Census	Pop.	Note	%±
1860	1,289		—
1870	1,219		−5.4%
1880	1,135		−6.9%
1890	975		−14.1%
1900	859		−11.9%
1910	765		−10.9%
1920	635		−17.0%
1930	657		3.5%
1940	586		−10.8%
1950	569		−2.9%
1960	450		−20.9%
1970	371		−17.6%
1980	314		−15.4%
1990	282		−10.2%
2000	269		−4.6%
2010	248		−7.8%
2020	246		−0.8%
U.S. Decennial Census

As of the 2020 census there were 246 people, 117 households, and 112 families residing in the township. The population density was 6.46 inhabitants per square mile (2.49/km^{2}). There were 117 housing units at an average density of 3.07 per square mile (1.19/km^{2}). The racial makeup of the township was 95.12% White, 0.00% African American, 0.00% Native American, 0.00% Asian, 0.00% Pacific Islander, 0.41% from other races, and 4.47% from two or more races. Hispanic or Latino people of any race were 0.81% of the population.

There were 117 households, out of which 12.00% had children under the age of 18 living with them, 95.73% were married couples living together, 0.00% had a female householder with no spouse present, and 4.27% were non-families. 4.30% of all households were made up of individuals, and 4.30% had someone living alone who was 65 years of age or older. The average household size was 2.49 and the average family size was 2.55.

The township's age distribution consisted of 16.8% under the age of 18, 5.5% from 18 to 24, 22.3% from 25 to 44, 45.4% from 45 to 64, and 10.0% who were 65 years of age or older. The median age was 45.5 years. For every 100 females, there were 66.3 males. For every 100 females age 18 and over, there were 92.1 males.

The median income for a household in the township was $89,648, and the median income for a family was $89,844. Males had a median income of $66,146 versus $41,103 for females. The per capita income for the township was $36,321. No families and 1.7% of the population were below the poverty line, including none of those under age 18 and 17.2% of those age 65 or over.

== School districts ==
- Hamilton Community Consolidated School District 328
- Southeastern Community Unit School District 337
- Warsaw Community Unit School District 316

== Political districts ==
- Illinois's 18th congressional district
- State House District 94
- State Senate District 47
