= Walker Township, Hancock County, Illinois =

Walker Township
- Township
- Township cemetery and a township road in Tioga

- Location in Hancock County

- Hancock County's location in Illinois
- Coordinates: 40°14′33″N 91°18′48″W
- Country: United States
- State: Illinois
- County: Hancock
- Established: November 6, 1849

Area
  - Total: 38.12 sq mi (98.7 km^{2})
  - Land: 37.98 sq mi (98.4 km^{2})
  - Water: 0.15 sq mi (0.39 km^{2}) 0.39%
- Elevation: 640 ft (195 m)

Population (2020)
  - Total: 291
  - Density: 7.66/sq mi (2.96/km^{2})
- Time zone: UTC-6 (CST)
  - Summer (DST): UTC-5 (CDT)
- ZIP codes: 62349, 62373, 62379, 62380
- FIPS code: 17-067-78422

Walker Township is one of twenty-four townships in Hancock County, Illinois, USA. As of the 2020 census, its population was 291 and it contained 154 housing units.

== Geography ==
According to the 2021 census gazetteer files, Walker Township has a total area of 38.12 square miles (98.73 km^{2}), of which 37.98 square miles (98.37 km^{2}) (or 99.61%) is land and 0.15 square miles (0.39 km^{2}) (or 0.39%) is water.

=== Unincorporated towns ===
- Breckenridge at 40.243657°N 91.286535°W
- Sutter at 40.279212°N 91.343482°W
- Tioga at 40.211157°N 91.347093°W

(This list is based on USGS data and may include former settlements.)

=== Cemeteries ===
The township contains these seven cemeteries: Bethany, Bethlehem Church of Christ, Buckeye, Grant, Salem Church-Sutter, Walker and West Tioga.

=== Major highways ===
- Illinois Route 96

== Demographics ==
Historical population
Census	Pop.	Note	%±
1860	1,529		—
1870	1,474		−3.6%
1880	1,612		9.4%
1890	1,361		−15.6%
1900	1,164		−14.5%
1910	978		−16.0%
1920	922		−5.7%
1930	774		−16.1%
1940	739		−4.5%
1950	615		−16.8%
1960	578		−6.0%
1970	565		−2.2%
1980	481		−14.9%
1990	371		−22.9%
2000	315		−15.1%
2010	333		5.7%
2020	291		−12.6%
U.S. Decennial Census

As of the 2020 census there were 291 people, 138 households, and 91 families residing in the township. The population density was 7.63 inhabitants per square mile (2.95/km^{2}). There were 154 housing units at an average density of 4.04 per square mile (1.56/km^{2}). The racial makeup of the township was 99.66% White, 0.00% African American, 0.00% Native American, 0.00% Asian, 0.00% Pacific Islander, 0.00% from other races, and 0.34% from two or more races. Hispanic or Latino of any race were 0.34% of the population.

There were 138 households, out of which 8.70% had children under the age of 18 living with them, 65.94% were married couples living together, 0.00% had a female householder with no spouse present, and 34.06% were non-families. 34.10% of all households were made up of individuals, and 26.10% had someone living alone who was 65 years of age or older. The average household size was 1.93 and the average family size was 2.42.

The township's age distribution consisted of 7.9% under the age of 18, 7.9% from 18 to 24, 7.8% from 25 to 44, 52.9% from 45 to 64, and 23.6% who were 65 years of age or older. The median age was 56.2 years. For every 100 females, there were 118.9 males. For every 100 females age 18 and over, there were 132.1 males.

The median income for a household in the township was $35,700, and the median income for a family was $41,563. Males had a median income of $38,365 versus $31,023 for females. The per capita income for the township was $28,710. About 18.7% of families and 11.6% of the population were below the poverty line, including none of those under age 18 and 28.6% of those age 65 or over.

== School districts ==
- Community Unit School District 4
- Southeastern Community Unit School District 337
- Warsaw Community Unit School District 316

== Political districts ==
- Illinois's 18th congressional district
- State House District 94
- State Senate District 47
