= Adrian, Illinois =

- Unincorporated community
- Location within Illinois Location within the United States
- Coordinates: 40°31′15″N 91°10′02″W
- Country: United States
- State: Illinois
- County: Hancock County
- Township: Rock Creek Township
- Elevation: 699 ft (213 m)
- ZIP code: 62318
- GNIS feature ID: 0403362

Adrian is an unincorporated community in Rock Creek Township, Hancock County, Illinois, United States. Adrian no longer has a post office and is now served by Dallas City. It hosts a grain elevator, Chem Gro, and several houses. A former Disciples of Christ Church stands at the west end of the community. The former one-room school at the east end of the community is now a farm machine shed.

== History ==
Adrian was laid out in the 1870s, taking its name from Adrian, Michigan. A post office was in operation in Adrian from 1870 until 1992.
