= St. Patrick, Missouri =

Unincorporated community in Missouri, U.S.

Coordinates: 40°15′50″N 91°37′38″W

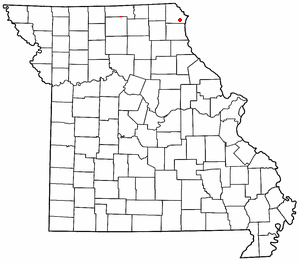

St. Patrick or Saint Patrick is an unincorporated community in southern Clark County, Missouri, United States. It is located approximately ten miles northwest of Canton on Route 81. The community was founded in 1833 by Irish immigrants, who named it after the patron saint of Ireland, Saint Patrick. Today, it is best known as the home of the Shrine of St. Patrick, a medieval-inspired Catholic church.

St. Patrick is part of the Fort Madison–Keokuk, IA-MO Micropolitan Statistical Area.

St. Patrick was originally called St. Marysville, and under the latter name was platted in 1857.
