= Durham Township, Hancock County, Illinois =

Durham Township
- Township
- Township building in Durham

- Location in Hancock County

- Hancock County's location in Illinois
- Coordinates: 40°35′42″N 91°04′25″W
- Country: United States
- State: Illinois
- County: Hancock
- Established: November 6, 1849

Area
  - Total: 36.94 sq mi (95.7 km^{2})
  - Land: 36.91 sq mi (95.6 km^{2})
  - Water: 0.03 sq mi (0.078 km^{2}) 0.08%
- Elevation: 650 ft (198 m)

Population (2020)
  - Total: 248
  - Density: 6.72/sq mi (2.59/km^{2})
- Time zone: UTC-6 (CST)
  - Summer (DST): UTC-5 (CDT)
- ZIP codes: 61450, 62318, 62330
- FIPS code: 17-067-21306

Durham Township is one of twenty-four townships in Hancock County, Illinois, USA. As of the 2020 census, its population was 248 and it contained 121 housing units.

== Geography ==
According to the 2021 census gazetteer files, Durham Township has a total area of 36.94 square miles (95.67 km^{2}), of which 36.91 square miles (95.60 km^{2}) (or 99.92%) is land and 0.03 square miles (0.08 km^{2}) (or 0.08%) is water.

=== Unincorporated towns ===
- Durham at 40.596709°N 91.089587°W

(This list is based on USGS data and may include former settlements.)

=== Cemeteries ===
The township contains these five cemeteries: Byler, Durham, Gittings, Gittings Mound and Vandruff.

=== Major highways ===
- Illinois Route 9
- Illinois Route 94

=== Airports and landing strips ===
- Douglas Airport

== Demographics ==
Historical population
Census	Pop.	Note	%±
1860	1,007		—
1870	1,019		1.2%
1880	1,073		5.3%
1890	840		−21.7%
1900	826		−1.7%
1910	787		−4.7%
1920	694		−11.8%
1930	637		−8.2%
1940	600		−5.8%
1950	548		−8.7%
1960	471		−14.1%
1970	453		−3.8%
1980	420		−7.3%
1990	333		−20.7%
2000	302		−9.3%
2010	278		−7.9%
2020	248		−10.8%
U.S. Decennial Census

As of the 2020 census there were 248 people, 45 households, and 15 families residing in the township. The population density was 6.71 inhabitants per square mile (2.59/km^{2}). There were 121 housing units at an average density of 3.28 per square mile (1.27/km^{2}). The racial makeup of the township was 97.58% White, 0.00% African American, 0.00% Native American, 0.00% Asian, 0.00% Pacific Islander, 0.00% from other races, and 2.42% from two or more races. Hispanic or Latino of any race were 0.81% of the population.

There were 45 households, out of which none had children under the age of 18 living with them, 33.33% were married couples living together and 66.67% were non-families. 66.70% of all households were made up of individuals, and 24.40% had someone living alone who was 65 years of age or older. The average household size was 1.36 and the average family size was 2.07.

The township's age distribution consisted of 0.0% under the age of 18, 0.0% from 18 to 24, 18% from 25 to 44, 21.3% from 45 to 64, and 60.7% who were 65 years of age or older. The median age was 69.3 years. For every 100 females, there were 154.2 males. For every 100 females age 18 and over, there were 154.2 males.

The median income for a household in the township was $43,295, and the median income for a family was $81,250. The per capita income for the township was $33,116. No families and 4.9% of the population were below the poverty line.

== School districts ==
The following school districts take portions of the township:

- One part is in La Harpe Community School District 347, while another part is in Dallas Elementary School District 327. Both of these districts are within Illini West High School District 307.
- A southwest portion of the township is in Nauvoo-Colusa Community Unit School District 325

== School districts ==
The following school districts take portions of the township:

- Dallas Elementary School District 327 and Illini West High School District 307
- Nauvoo-Colusa Community Unit School District 325

== Political districts ==
- Illinois's 18th congressional district
- State House District 94
- State Senate District 47
