= Breckenridge, Hancock County, Illinois =

- Unincorporated community
- Location within Illinois Location within the United States
- Coordinates: 40°14′37″N 91°17′12″W
- Country: United States
- State: Illinois
- County: Hancock
- Elevation: 659 ft (201 m)
- Time zone: UTC-6 (Central (CST))
  - Summer (DST): UTC-5 (CDT)
- Area code: 217
- GNIS feature ID: 422498

Breckenridge is an unincorporated community in Walker Township, Hancock County, Illinois, United States. Breckenridge is 5.5 miles (8.9 km) west of West Point.
