= Burnside, Illinois =

- Unincorporated community
- Location within Illinois Location within the United States
- Coordinates: 40°30′14″N 91°06′01″W
- Country: United States
- State: Illinois
- County: Hancock County
- Township: Pilot Grove Township
- Elevation: 646 ft (197 m)
- ZIP code: 62318
- GNIS feature ID: 0405251

Burnside is an unincorporated community in Pilot Grove Township, Hancock County, Illinois, United States.

== History ==
Burnside was founded in 1862, and named after Ambrose Everett Burnside, a railroad official.
