= Nauvoo–Colusa Community Unit School District 325 =

Public elementary school district in Hancock County, Illinois, U.S.

Address
- 2461 N. State Highway 96 Nauvoo, Illinois, 62354; United States
- Coordinates: 40°33′37″N 91°18′19″W

District information
- Grades: PreK–8
- Established: 1961
- President: Joe Radel
- Vice-president: Neva Koechle
- Superintendent: Mr. Mark Scott
- Schools: Nauvoo–Colusa Junior High School (7–8); Nauvoo–Colusa Elementary school (PreK–6)
- NCES District ID: 1727780

Students and staff
- Students: 251 (2018–19)
- Athletic conference: Hancock County Conference
- District mascot: Vikings
- Colors: Black and white

Other information
- Website: nauvoo-colusa.com

Nauvoo–Colusa Community Unit School District 325 is a school district headquartered in Appanoose Township, just east of Nauvoo, Illinois. It serves northwestern Hancock County, including the city of Nauvoo and the unincorporated community of Colusa.

It operates Nauvoo–Colusa Elementary School and Nauvoo–Colusa Junior High School. High school-aged students attend Warsaw High School, operated by Warsaw Community Unit School District 316.

== History ==
The previous Nauvoo Elementary School opened in 1923.

In 2001, Dallas City High School closed in Dallas City. The Dallas City area was reassigned to Nauvoo-Colusa for high school, so that year 70 students and all but two of the Dallas City High teachers moved to Nauvoo-Colusa High School. The school's enrollment increased to 180 from 111, and all of the classrooms used as storage became active classrooms. The Dallas City district donated equipment to the Nauvoo-Colusa High School. In 2007, the Dallas City, High School Students, converged into the Illini West School District.

In 2007, the Nauvoo-Colusa school district and the Warsaw Community Unit School District 316 agreed to a plan in which Nauvoo-Colusa would close its high school and send its students to Warsaw High School. In return the Warsaw district would close its junior high school and send its students to Nauvoo-Colusa Junior High School. On Tuesday February 12, 2008 voters in both districts approved the deactivation plans. High school students attended Nauvoo-Colusa High School from 1961 to 2008.

In 2015, the elementary school moved to the Nauvoo-Colusa High School campus. The Nauvoo city government acquired the former Nauvoo Elementary school for $231,600, effective July 1, 2015.

== Boundary ==
The district includes the city of Nauvoo and the Niota census-designated place. The district includes all of Nauvoo Township and parts of the following townships: Appanoose, Dallas City, Durham, Pilot Grove, Pontoosuc, Rock Creek, and Sonora.

== Athletics ==
Nauvoo-Colusa's Junior High School athletics participate in the Hancock County Conference and are members of the Illinois Elementary School Association.

=== Boys ===
- Baseball
- Basketball
- Track

=== Girls ===
- Basketball
- Track
- Volleyball

=== Notable team state finishes ===
- Boys basketball: High School Class 1A 1997–98 State Champions , 8th Grade Class 1A 1995 State Champions, 7th Grade Class 1A 1993 (4th place), 8th Grade Class 1A 1996 (4th place), 7th Grade Class 2A 2020 (Elite 8)
- Girls basketball: West Hancock Coop (Hamilton, Nauvoo-Colusa, Warsaw) State Champions Class 2A 2008, West Hancock Coop Runner-up Class 2A 2009, 8th Grade Class 2A 2021 (2nd place), 7th Grade Class 2A 2023 State Champions, 8th Grade Class 1A 2024 (3rd place)
- Boys baseball: 7th and 8th Grade Class 2A 2009 (Elite 8)
- Girls volleyball: 7th Grade Class 2A 2016 (Elite 8)

== See also ==
- List of school districts in Illinois
