= Joetta, Illinois =

- Unincorporated community
- Location within Illinois Location within the United States
- Coordinates: 40°26′01″N 90°55′53″W
- Country: United States
- State: Illinois
- County: Hancock
- Elevation: 669 ft (204 m)
- Time zone: UTC-6 (Central (CST))
  - Summer (DST): UTC-5 (CDT)
- Area code: 217
- GNIS feature ID: 422849

Joetta (also Uniontown) is an unincorporated community in Hancock County, Illinois, United States.
