= Old Niota, Illinois =

- Unincorporated community
- Location within Illinois Location within the United States
- Coordinates: 40°36′48″N 91°18′08″W
- Country: United States
- State: Illinois
- County: Hancock
- Elevation: 528 ft (161 m)
- Time zone: UTC-6 (Central (CST))
  - Summer (DST): UTC-5 (CDT)
- Area code: 217
- GNIS feature ID: 423037

Old Niota is an unincorporated community in Hancock County, Illinois, United States.
