= Nauvoo Township, Hancock County, Illinois =

Nauvoo Township
- Township
- A township road in unincorporated Nauvoo Township

- Location in Hancock County

- Hancock County's location in Illinois
- Coordinates: 40°33′10″N 91°22′53″W
- Country: United States
- State: Illinois
- County: Hancock
- Established: November 6, 1849

Area
  - Total: 6.37 sq mi (16.5 km^{2})
  - Land: 3.90 sq mi (10.1 km^{2})
  - Water: 2.47 sq mi (6.4 km^{2}) 38.73%
- Elevation: 620 ft (189 m)

Population (2020)
  - Total: 963
  - Density: 247/sq mi (95.3/km^{2})
- Time zone: UTC-6 (CST)
  - Summer (DST): UTC-5 (CDT)
- ZIP code: 62354
- FIPS code: 17-067-51804

Nauvoo Township is one of twenty-four townships in Hancock County, Illinois, USA. At the 2020 census, its population was 963 and it contained 667 housing units.

== Geography ==
According to the 2021 census gazetteer files, Nauvoo Township has a total area of 6.37 square miles (16.50 km^{2}), of which 3.90 square miles (10.10 km^{2}) (or 61.27%) is land and 2.47 square miles (6.40 km^{2}) (or 38.73%) is water.

=== Cities, towns, villages ===
- Nauvoo (vast majority)

=== Extinct towns ===
(These towns are listed as "historical" by the USGS.)

- Quashquema at 40.550042°N 91.386542°W
- Venus, circa 1832
- Commerce, circa 1834
- Commerce City, circa 1836

=== Cemeteries ===
The township contains two cemeteries, Dundey and Smith Family.

=== Major highways ===
- Illinois Route 96

=== Landmarks ===
- Nauvoo Illinois Temple
- Lovers Glen Park
- Nauvoo State Park

== Demographics ==
Historical population
Census	Pop.	Note	%±
1860	1,394		—
1870	1,578		13.2%
1880	1,402		−11.2%
1890	1,249		−10.9%
1900	1,372		9.8%
1910	1,068		−22.2%
1920	990		−7.3%
1930	973		−1.7%
1940	944		−3.0%
1950	1,243		31.7%
1960	1,051		−15.4%
1970	1,036		−1.4%
1980	1,260		21.6%
1990	1,108		−12.1%
2000	1,091		−1.5%
2010	1,156		6.0%
2020	963		−16.7%
U.S. Decennial Census

As of the 2020 census there were 963 people, 320 households, and 247 families residing in the township. The population density was 151.30 inhabitants per square mile (58.42/km^{2}). There were 667 housing units at an average density of 104.79 per square mile (40.46/km^{2}). The racial makeup of the township was 91.69% White, 0.31% African American, 1.04% Native American, 0.10% Asian, 0.10% Pacific Islander, 1.25% from other races, and 5.50% from two or more races. Hispanic or Latino of any race were 2.49% of the population.

There were 320 households, out of which 30.90% had children under the age of 18 living with them, 66.56% were married couples living together, 7.50% had a female householder with no spouse present, and 22.81% were non-families. 16.90% of all households were made up of individuals, and 9.10% had someone living alone who was 65 years of age or older. The average household size was 2.73 and the average family size was 2.97.

The township's age distribution consisted of 21.7% under the age of 18, 7.9% from 18 to 24, 27.7% from 25 to 44, 11.2% from 45 to 64, and 31.4% who were 65 years of age or older. The median age was 40.4 years. For every 100 females, there were 115.7 males. For every 100 females age 18 and over, there were 104.0 males.

The median income for a household in the township was $52,794, and the median income for a family was $54,338. Males had a median income of $38,500 versus $13,958 for females. The per capita income for the township was $22,046. About 21.9% of families and 27.3% of the population were below the poverty line, including 30.7% of those under age 18 and 8.0% of those age 65 or over.

== School districts ==
- Nauvoo–Colusa Community Unit School District 325

== Political districts ==
- Illinois's 18th congressional district
- State House District 94
- State Senate District 47
