= Lomax Township, Henderson County, Illinois =

Lomax Township
- Township
- Location in Henderson County

- Henderson County's location in Illinois
- Coordinates: 40°40′27″N 91°04′46″W
- Country: United States
- State: Illinois
- County: Henderson
- Established: November 6, 1906

Area
  - Total: 33.02 sq mi (85.5 km^{2})
  - Land: 28.48 sq mi (73.8 km^{2})
  - Water: 4.54 sq mi (11.8 km^{2}) 13.74%
- Elevation: 554 ft (169 m)

Population (2020)
  - Total: 748
  - Density: 26.3/sq mi (10.1/km^{2})
- Time zone: UTC-6 (CST)
  - Summer (DST): UTC-5 (CDT)
- ZIP codes: 61425, 61454, 62330
- FIPS code: 17-071-44394

Lomax Township is one of eleven townships in Henderson County, Illinois, USA. As of the 2020 census, its population was 748 and it contained 367 housing units.

== Geography ==
According to the 2021 census gazetteer files, Lomax Township has a total area of 33.02 square miles (85.52 km^{2}), of which 28.48 square miles (73.76 km^{2}) (or 86.26%) is land and 4.54 square miles (11.76 km^{2}) (or 13.74%) is water.

=== Cities, towns, villages ===
- Dallas City (north half)
- Lomax

=== Unincorporated towns ===
- Iowa Junction at 40.687263°N 91.060143°W

(This list is based on USGS data and may include former settlements.)

=== Cemeteries ===
The township contains these four cemeteries: Clover, Crane, Freeland and Shaw.

=== Major highways ===
- Illinois Route 96

== Demographics ==
As of the 2020 census there were 748 people, 337 households, and 263 families residing in the township. The population density was 22.65 inhabitants per square mile (8.75/km^{2}). There were 367 housing units at an average density of 11.12 per square mile (4.29/km^{2}). The racial makeup of the township was 94.12% White, 0.13% African American, 0.00% Native American, 0.53% Asian, 0.00% Pacific Islander, 1.07% from other races, and 4.14% from two or more races. Hispanic or Latino of any race were 3.74% of the population.

There were 337 households, out of which 28.50% had children under the age of 18 living with them, 70.92% were married couples living together, 5.93% had a female householder with no spouse present, and 21.96% were non-families. 18.70% of all households were made up of individuals, and 6.50% had someone living alone who was 65 years of age or older. The average household size was 2.32 and the average family size was 2.65.

The township's age distribution consisted of 18.8% under the age of 18, 8.2% from 18 to 24, 26.1% from 25 to 44, 25.3% from 45 to 64, and 21.5% who were 65 years of age or older. The median age was 43.9 years. For every 100 females, there were 96.5 males. For every 100 females age 18 and over, there were 96.6 males.

The median income for a household in the township was $53,988, and the median income for a family was $67,625. Males had a median income of $51,055 versus $31,979 for females. The per capita income for the township was $27,751. About 9.9% of families and 13.7% of the population were below the poverty line, including 29.9% of those under age 18 and 3.6% of those age 65 or over.

Historical population
Census	Pop.	Note	%±
2000	921		—
2010	850		−7.7%
2020	748		−12.0%
U.S. Decennial Census

== School districts ==
- West Central Community Unit School District 235

== Political districts ==
- Illinois's 17th congressional district
- State House District 94
- State Senate District 47
