= Niota, Illinois =

- Unincorporated community
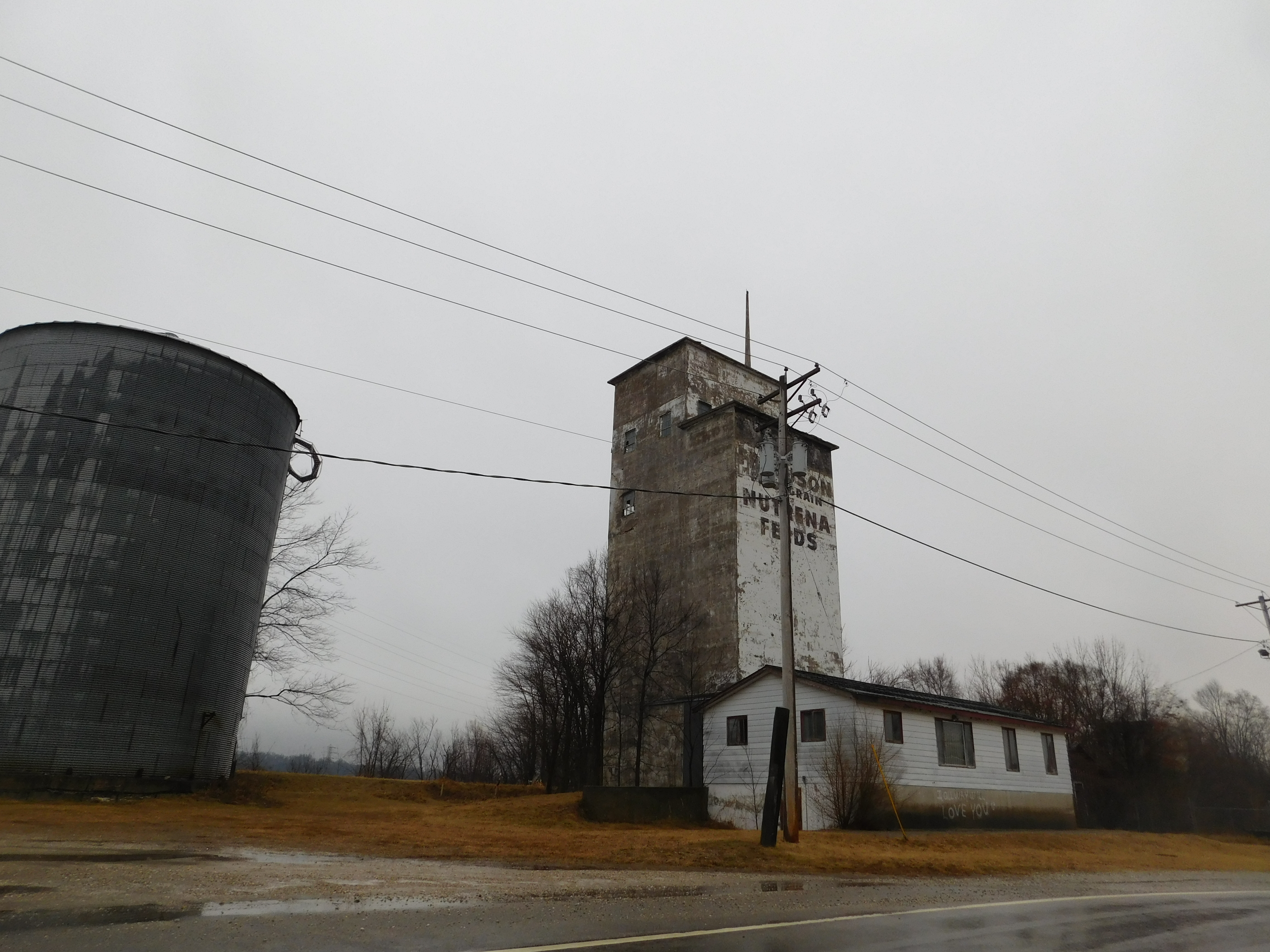
- An unused grain elevator in Niota in January 2017

- Location within Illinois Location within the United States
- Coordinates: 40°36′56″N 91°17′17″W
- Country: United States
- State: Illinois
- County: Hancock County
- Township: Appanoose Township

Area
  - Total: 0.57 sq mi (1.48 km^{2})
  - Land: 0.52 sq mi (1.35 km^{2})
  - Water: 0.050 sq mi (0.13 km^{2})
- Elevation: 522 ft (159 m)

Population (2020)
  - Total: 114
  - Density: 217.9/sq mi (84.14/km^{2})
- Time zone: UTC-6 (CST)
  - Summer (DST): UTC-5 (CDT)
- ZIP code: 62358
- FIPS code: 17-53078
- GNIS feature ID: 2804091

Niota (also East Fort Madison, East Fort Madison Station) is an unincorporated community in Appanoose Township, Hancock County, in the U.S. state of Illinois. The community is located on the bank of the Mississippi River and is at the eastern end of the Fort Madison Toll Bridge, which connects Niota to Fort Madison, Iowa. Niota is the western terminus of Illinois Route 9 and is also served by Illinois Route 96, which is part of the Great River Road.

As of the 2020 census, Niota had a population of 114.

== History ==
The community has fought Mississippi River flooding (cresting levees) through its history. In response to Upper Mississippi River flooding in April 1965, the US Coast Guard sent its Goldenrod to the community on May 3, 1965, for relief.

During the July 1993 flooding, inmates helped local residents to reinforce the levees in order to save the community. The effort failed, and the 1993 flood damage from the Mississippi River was the worst in its history. The Federal Emergency Management Agency (FEMA) proposed that the community be relocated and incorporated at a cost of $8.5 million, though most townspeople preferred to stay where they were.

== Geography ==
According to the 2021 census gazetteer files, Niota has a total area of 0.57 square miles (1.48 km^{2}), of which 0.52 square miles (1.35 km^{2}) (or 91.27%) is land and 0.05 square miles (0.13 km^{2}) (or 8.73%) is water.

== Demographics ==
Historical population
Census	Pop.	Note	%±
2020	114		—
U.S. Decennial Census

Niota first appeared as a census-designated place in the 2020 U.S. census.

As of the 2020 census there were 114 people, 35 households, and 31 families residing in the CDP. The population density was 198.95 inhabitants per square mile (76.82/km^{2}). There were 52 housing units at an average density of 90.75 per square mile (35.04/km^{2}). The racial makeup of the CDP was 89.47% White, 1.75% African American, 0.00% Native American, 0.00% Asian, 0.00% Pacific Islander, 0.00% from other races, and 8.77% from two or more races. Hispanic or Latino of any race were 0.00% of the population.

There were 35 households, out of which 62.9% had children under the age of 18 living with them, 88.57% were married couples living together, none had a female householder with no husband present, and 11.43% were non-families. 11.43% of all households were made up of individuals, and 11.43% had someone living alone who was 65 years of age or older. The average household size was 2.61 and the average family size was 2.43.

The CDP's age distribution consisted of 28.2% under the age of 18, 0.0% from 18 to 24, 11.8% from 25 to 44, 44.7% from 45 to 64, and 15.3% who were 65 years of age or older. The median age was 51.7 years. For every 100 females, there were 142.9 males. For every 100 females age 18 and over, there were 103.3 males.

The median income for a household in the CDP was $48,750. The per capita income for the CDP was $27,058. No families and 4.7% of the population were below the poverty line, including none of those under age 18 and 30.8% of those age 65 or over.

== Education ==
It is in the Nauvoo–Colusa Community Unit School District 325. The district sends its high school students to Warsaw Community Unit School District 316.

== Transportation ==
Amtrak’s Southwest Chief, which operates between Los Angeles and Chicago, passes through the town on BNSF tracks, but makes no stop. The nearest station is located in Fort Madison, 1 mile (1.6 km) across the Mississippi river.
