= Elvaston, Illinois =

- Village
- Location of Elvaston in Hancock County, Illinois.
- Coordinates: 40°23′44″N 91°15′08″W
- Country: United States
- State: Illinois
- County: Hancock

Area
  - Total: 0.80 sq mi (2.07 km^{2})
  - Land: 0.80 sq mi (2.07 km^{2})
  - Water: 0 sq mi (0.00 km^{2})
- Elevation: 659 ft (201 m)

Population (2020)
  - Total: 147
  - Density: 184.1/sq mi (71.07/km^{2})
- Time zone: UTC-6 (CST)
  - Summer (DST): UTC-5 (CDT)
- ZIP code: 62334
- Area code: 217
- FIPS code: 17-23841
- GNIS ID: 2398821

Elvaston is a village in Hancock County, Illinois, United States. The population was 147 at the 2020 census.

== Geography ==
Elvaston is located in west-central Hancock County. U.S. Route 136 passes through the center of the village, leading east 6 miles (10 km) to Carthage, the county seat, and west 5 miles (8 km) to Hamilton on the Mississippi River.

According to the 2021 census gazetteer files, Elvaston has a total area of 0.80 square miles (2.07 km^{2}), all land.

== Demographics ==
Historical population
Census	Pop.	Note	%±
1880	294		—
1890	307		4.4%
1900	308		0.3%
1910	250		−18.8%
1920	204		−18.4%
1930	210		2.9%
1940	226		7.6%
1950	238		5.3%
1960	232		−2.5%
1970	238		2.6%
1980	231		−2.9%
1990	198		−14.3%
2000	152		−23.2%
2010	165		8.6%
2020	147		−10.9%
U.S. Decennial Census

As of the 2020 census there were 147 people, 67 households, and 30 families residing in the village. The population density was 183.98 inhabitants per square mile (71.04/km^{2}). There were 80 housing units at an average density of 100.13 per square mile (38.66/km^{2}). The racial makeup of the village was 94.56% White, 0.68% African American, 0.00% Native American, 0.68% Asian, 0.00% Pacific Islander, 0.00% from other races, and 4.08% from two or more races. Hispanic or Latino of any race were 0.68% of the population.

There were 67 households, out of which 14.9% had children under the age of 18 living with them, 31.34% were married couples living together, 5.97% had a female householder with no husband present, and 55.22% were non-families. 55.22% of all households were made up of individuals, and 20.90% had someone living alone who was 65 years of age or older. The average household size was 3.70 and the average family size was 2.25.

The village's age distribution consisted of 23.8% under the age of 18, 7.9% from 18 to 24, 10.6% from 25 to 44, 39.7% from 45 to 64, and 17.9% who were 65 years of age or older. The median age was 51.3 years. For every 100 females, there were 104.1 males. For every 100 females age 18 and over, there were 94.9 males.

The median income for a household in the village was $25,938, and the median income for a family was $43,750. Males had a median income of $36,250 versus $10,625 for females. The per capita income for the village was $17,405. About 23.3% of families and 22.5% of the population were below the poverty line, including 22.2% of those under age 18 and 3.7% of those age 65 or over.
