= St. Mary Township, Hancock County, Illinois =

Saint Mary Township
- Township
- Location in Hancock County

- Hancock County's location in Illinois
- Coordinates: 40°19′38″N 90°58′03″W
- Country: United States
- State: Illinois
- County: Hancock
- Established: November 6, 1849

Area
  - Total: 36.98 sq mi (95.8 km^{2})
  - Land: 36.98 sq mi (95.8 km^{2})
  - Water: 0.00 sq mi (0 km^{2}) 0.01%
- Elevation: 538 ft (164 m)

Population (2020)
  - Total: 568
  - Density: 15.4/sq mi (5.93/km^{2})
- Time zone: UTC-6 (CST)
  - Summer (DST): UTC-5 (CDT)
- ZIP codes: 62316, 62321, 62367
- FIPS code: 17-067-67054

Saint Mary's Township is one of twenty-four townships in Hancock County, Illinois, USA. As of the 2010 census, its population was 568 and it contained 295 housing units.

== Geography ==
According to the 2021 census gazetteer files, St. Mary Township has a total area of 36.98 square miles (95.78 km^{2}), of which 36.98 square miles (95.78 km^{2}) (or 99.99%) is land and 0.00 square miles (0.00 km^{2}) (or 0.01%) is water.

=== Cities, towns, villages ===
- Plymouth (vast majority)

=== Major highways ===
- Illinois Route 61

== Demographics ==
Historical population
Census	Pop.	Note	%±
1860	1,470		—
1870	1,650		12.2%
1880	1,542		−6.5%
1890	1,561		1.2%
1900	1,626		4.2%
1910	1,576		−3.1%
1920	1,583		0.4%
1930	1,332		−15.9%
1940	1,381		3.7%
1950	1,343		−2.8%
1960	1,191		−11.3%
1970	1,050		−11.8%
1980	902		−14.1%
1990	701		−22.3%
2000	714		1.9%
2010	640		−10.4%
2020	568		−11.2%
U.S. Decennial Census

As of the 2020 census there were 568 people, 278 households, and 184 families residing in the township. The population density was 15.36 inhabitants per square mile (5.93/km^{2}). There were 295 housing units at an average density of 7.98 per square mile (3.08/km^{2}). The racial makeup of the township was 97.36% White, 0.70% African American, 0.00% Native American, 0.35% Asian, 0.00% Pacific Islander, 0.53% from other races, and 1.06% from two or more races. Hispanic or Latino of any race were 0.88% of the population.

There were 278 households, out of which 20.90% had children under the age of 18 living with them, 57.19% were married couples living together, 5.04% had a female householder with no spouse present, and 33.81% were non-families. 30.20% of all households were made up of individuals, and 9.40% had someone living alone who was 65 years of age or older. The average household size was 2.23 and the average family size was 2.78.

The township's age distribution consisted of 15.6% under the age of 18, 11.3% from 18 to 24, 11.5% from 25 to 44, 30.4% from 45 to 64, and 31.2% who were 65 years of age or older. The median age was 51.2 years. For every 100 females, there were 132.6 males. For every 100 females age 18 and over, there were 130.8 males.

The median income for a household in the township was $45,833, and the median income for a family was $58,333. Males had a median income of $40,179 versus $34,063 for females. The per capita income for the township was $25,668. About 12.0% of families and 15.0% of the population were below the poverty line, including 39.2% of those under age 18 and 10.3% of those age 65 or over.

== School districts ==
- Southeastern Community Unit School District 337

== Political districts ==
- Illinois's 18th congressional district
- State House District 94
- State Senate District 47
