= Sutter, Hancock County, Illinois =

- Unincorporated community
- Location within Illinois Location within the United States
- Coordinates: 40°16′45″N 91°20′37″W
- Country: United States
- State: Illinois
- County: Hancock
- Elevation: 656 ft (200 m)
- Time zone: UTC-6 (Central (CST))
  - Summer (DST): UTC-5 (CDT)
- ZIP code: 62373
- Area code: 217
- GNIS feature ID: 419436

Sutter is an unincorporated community in Hancock County, Illinois, United States. Sutter is 9 miles (14 km) south of Hamilton. Sutter had a post office, which closed on July 23, 1994.
