= Elderville, Illinois =

- Unincorporated community
- Location within Illinois Location within the United States
- Coordinates: 40°19′49″N 91°17′41″W
- Country: United States
- State: Illinois
- County: Hancock
- Elevation: 669 ft (204 m)
- Time zone: UTC-6 (Central (CST))
  - Summer (DST): UTC-5 (CDT)
- Area code: 217
- GNIS feature ID: 422661

Elderville is an unincorporated community in Hancock County, Illinois, United States.
