= Durham, Illinois =

- Unincorporated community
- Location within Illinois Location within the United States
- Coordinates: 40°35′48″N 91°05′23″W
- Country: United States
- State: Illinois
- County: Hancock
- Elevation: 643 ft (196 m)
- Time zone: UTC-6 (Central (CST))
  - Summer (DST): UTC-5 (CDT)
- Area code: 217
- GNIS feature ID: 422643

Durham is an unincorporated community in Hancock County, Illinois, United States. Durham is 6 miles (9.7 km) west of La Harpe.

== History ==
Durham was laid out in 1839. A large share of the early settlers being natives of Durham, Connecticut caused the name to be selected. A post office was established at Durham in 1850, and remained in operation until 1905.
