= Plymouth, Illinois =

- Village
- Location in Hancock and McDonough counties, Illinois
- Coordinates: 40°17′32″N 90°54′59″W
- Country: United States
- State: Illinois
- Counties: Hancock, McDonough
- Townships: St. Mary, Lamoine

Area
  - Total: 0.56 sq mi (1.46 km^{2})
  - Land: 0.56 sq mi (1.46 km^{2})
  - Water: 0 sq mi (0.00 km^{2})
- Elevation: 643 ft (196 m)

Population (2020)
  - Total: 436
  - Density: 772.3/sq mi (298.17/km^{2})
- Time zone: UTC-6 (CST)
  - Summer (DST): UTC-5 (CDT)
- ZIP code: 62367
- Area code: 309
- FIPS code: 17-60833
- GNIS feature ID: 2398989

Plymouth is a village in Hancock and McDonough counties, Illinois, United States. The population was 436 at the 2020 census, down from 505 in 2010.

== Geography ==
Plymouth is located in southeastern Hancock County with a small portion of the village extending east into the southwest corner of McDonough County. Illinois Route 61 passes through the village, leading northeast 4.5 miles (7.2 km) to Colmar and southwest 5 miles (8 km) to Augusta. Carthage, the Hancock County seat, is 21 miles (34 km) to the northwest of Plymouth.

According to the 2021 census gazetteer files, Plymouth has a total area of 0.57 square miles (1.48 km^{2}), all land. The village drains north toward Bronson Creek and south toward Flour Creek, both east-flowing tributaries of the La Moine River and part of the Illinois River watershed.

== Demographics ==
Historical population
Census	Pop.	Note	%±
1880	593		—
1890	710		19.7%
1900	854		20.3%
1910	829		−2.9%
1920	900		8.6%
1930	745		−17.2%
1940	808		8.5%
1950	854		5.7%
1960	781		−8.5%
1970	740		−5.2%
1980	649		−12.3%
1990	521		−19.7%
2000	562		7.9%
2010	505		−10.1%
2020	436		−13.7%
U.S. Decennial Census

As of the 2020 census there were 436 people, 198 households, and 127 families residing in the village. The population density was 771.68 inhabitants per square mile (297.95/km^{2}). There were 224 housing units at an average density of 396.46 per square mile (153.07/km^{2}). The racial makeup of the village was 96.56% White, 0.92% African American, 0.00% Native American, 0.23% Asian, 0.00% Pacific Islander, 0.23% from other races, and 2.06% from two or more races. Hispanic or Latino of any race were 0.92% of the population.

There were 198 households, out of which 20.2% had children under the age of 18 living with them, 51.52% were married couples living together, 7.07% had a female householder with no husband present, and 35.86% were non-families. 30.81% of all households were made up of individuals, and 13.13% had someone living alone who was 65 years of age or older. The average household size was 2.79 and the average family size was 2.23.

The village's age distribution consisted of 18.6% under the age of 18, 11.6% from 18 to 24, 13.8% from 25 to 44, 23.8% from 45 to 64, and 32.2% who were 65 years of age or older. The median age was 50.8 years. For every 100 females, there were 106.1 males. For every 100 females age 18 and over, there were 106.3 males.

The median income for a household in the village was $47,083, and the median income for a family was $51,875. Males had a median income of $45,662 versus $38,333 for females. The per capita income for the village was $26,386. About 17.3% of families and 21.1% of the population were below the poverty line, including 46.3% of those under age 18 and 14.1% of those age 65 or over.

== Education ==
Residents attend Southeastern High School which is located in nearby Augusta.
