= Dallas City, Illinois =

- City
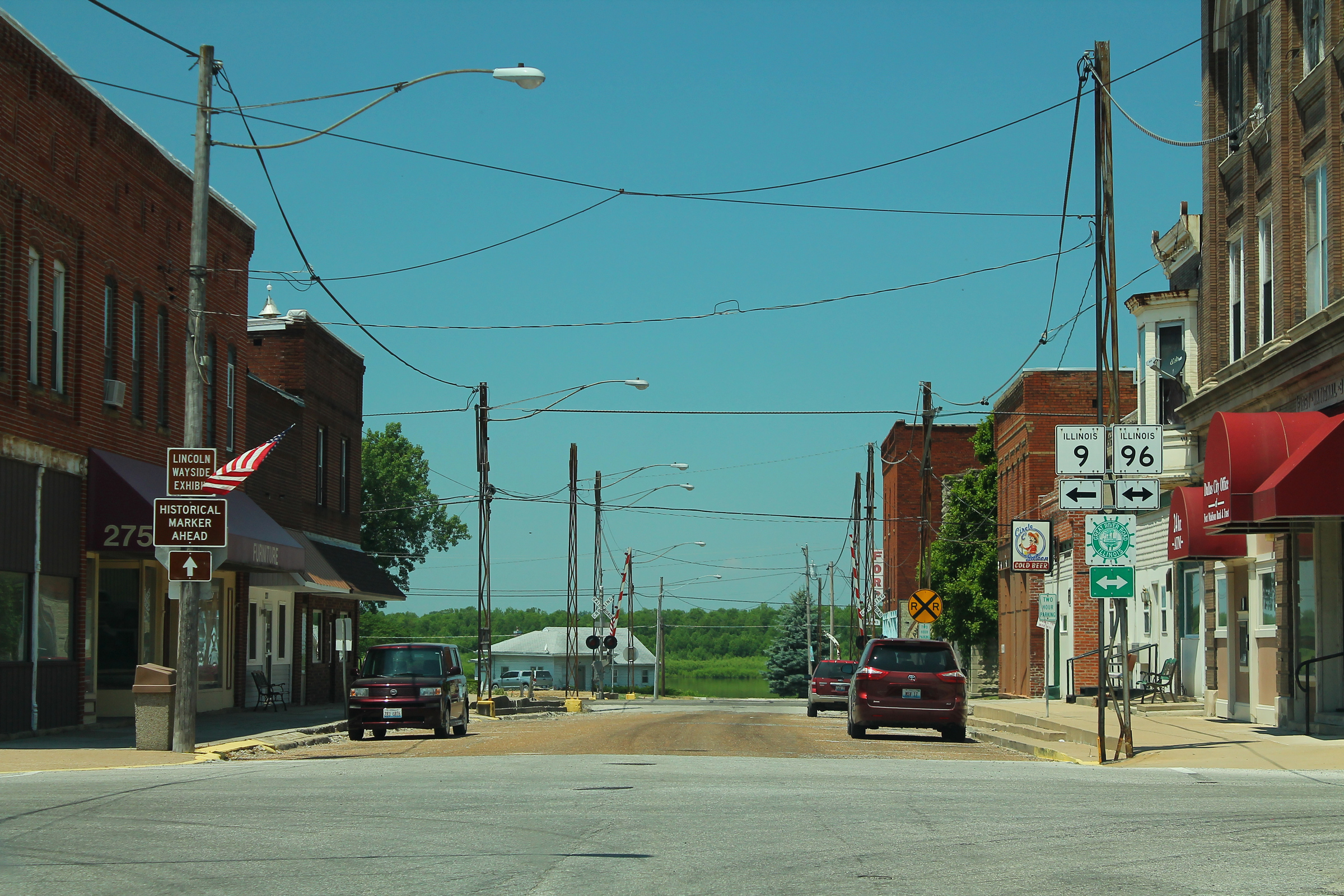
- IL 9 and IL 96 intersect in downtown Dallas City

- Location of Dallas City in Henderson County, Illinois.

- Location of Illinois in the United States
- Coordinates: 40°38′12″N 91°9′55″W
- Country: United States
- State: Illinois
- Counties: Hancock, Henderson
- Townships: Dallas City, Pontoosuc, Lomax

Area
  - Total: 3.27 sq mi (8.48 km^{2})
  - Land: 2.37 sq mi (6.15 km^{2})
  - Water: 0.90 sq mi (2.33 km^{2})
- Elevation: 584 ft (178 m)

Population (2020)
  - Total: 805
  - Density: 339/sq mi (130.9/km^{2})
- Time zone: UTC-6 (CST)
  - Summer (DST): UTC-5 (CDT)
- ZIP Code(s): 62330
- Area code: 217
- FIPS code: 17-18420
- GNIS feature ID: 2393708
- Wikimedia Commons: Dallas City, Illinois
- Website: www.dallascity-il.com

Dallas City is a city in Hancock and Henderson counties in the U.S. state of Illinois. The population in 2020 stands at an estimate of 805, a decline from the 2010 census of 945, which was a decline from 1,055 in 2000.

The Hancock County portion of Dallas City is part of the Fort Madison–Keokuk, IA–IL–MO Micropolitan Statistical Area, and the Henderson County portion of Dallas City is part of the Burlington, IA–IL Micropolitan Statistical Area.

== History ==
According to historical records, a man named Israel Atherton purchased the land around present-day Dallas City in 1836. He built a log cabin but he didn't seem to stay very long. He sold the land to John Finch, who built a village, which today is still recognized as Dallas City. It was laid out in 1848, and named in honor of George Mifflin Dallas, 11th Vice President of the United States of America, from 1845 to 1849. A post office has been in operation at Dallas City since 1850.

=== Abraham Lincoln Monument ===
On October 23, 1858, Abraham Lincoln stopped in Dallas City, Illinois to deliver a speech. Many local men were instrumental in persuading Lincoln to visit Dallas in 1858, including George M. Ames, H.F. Black, and Ben Mendenhall. According to the Dallas City Review newspaper, several efforts were made by Democrats to tear down the platform that had been erected for Lincoln to use during his speech. Republican forces, however, were present and did not allow it to happen. A monument to represent Lincoln's visit sits on the Mississippi River on the Riverfront Park at the end of Oak St.

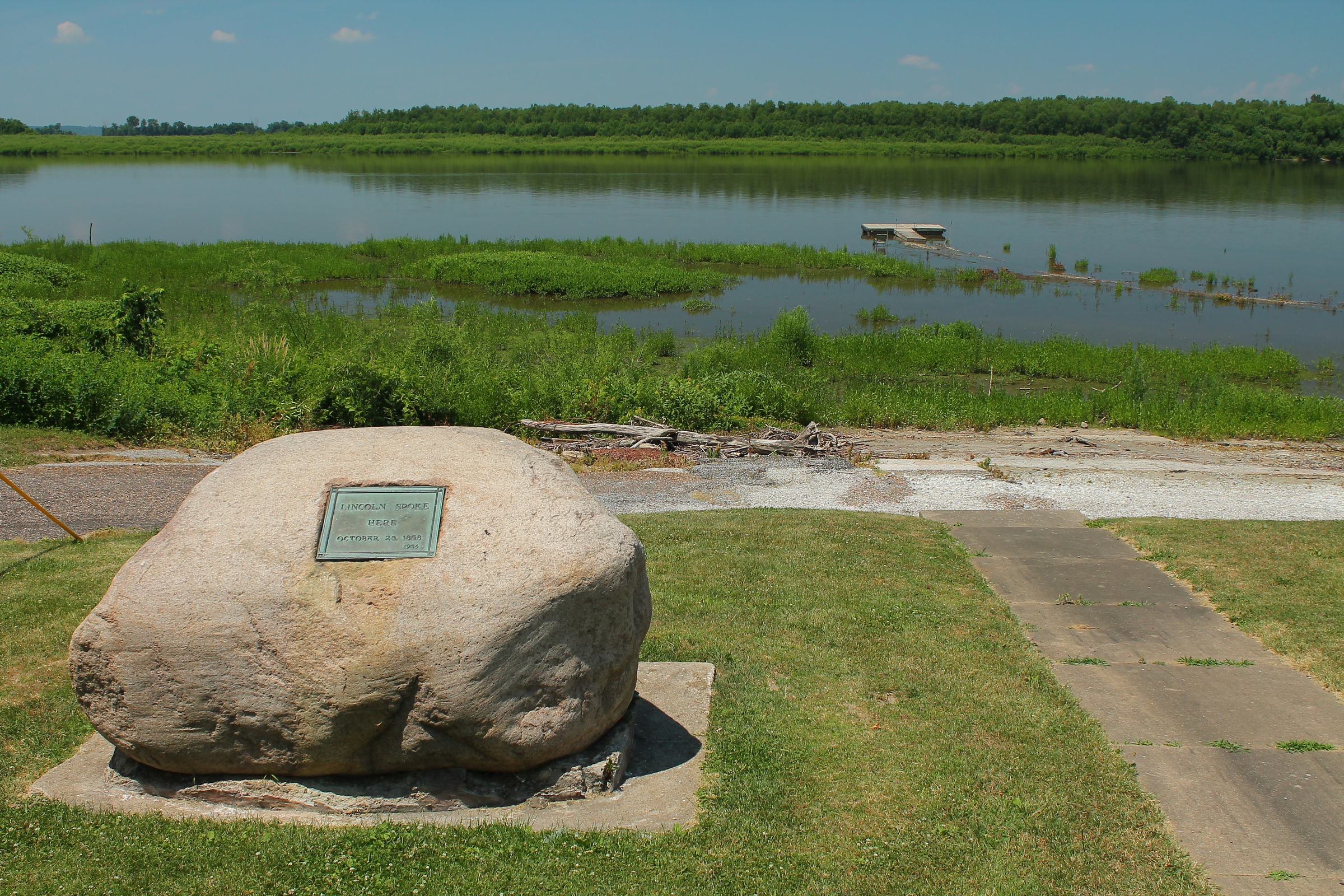
Stone site where Abraham Lincoln gave his speech.

There was supposed to be two stones with bronze plaques, one for Lincoln's visit, the other for President James Polk along with his vice-president, George M Dallas. There is no information given as to why that other plaque was not included on the stone, but it is assumed Lincoln's was more impactful.

The day before (October 22, 1858), Lincoln had spoken at the second courthouse made in Hancock County, the county Dallas City is a part of, to residents as he and Stephen A. Douglas were running against one another for the US Senate.

== Geography ==
According to the 2021 census gazetteer files, Dallas City has a total area of 3.28 square miles (8.50 km^{2}), of which 2.37 square miles (6.14 km^{2}) (or 72.47%) is land and 0.90 square miles (2.33 km^{2}) (or 27.53%) is water.

== Demographics ==
Historical population
Census	Pop.	Note	%±
1870	78		—
1880	829		962.8%
1890	747		−9.9%
1900	970		29.9%
1910	1,288		32.8%
1920	1,140		−11.5%
1930	1,114		−2.3%
1940	1,149		3.1%
1950	1,275		11.0%
1960	1,276		0.1%
1970	1,284		0.6%
1980	1,408		9.7%
1990	1,037		−26.3%
2000	1,055		1.7%
2010	945		−10.4%
2020	805		−14.8%
U.S. Decennial Census

As of the 2020 census there were 805 people, 464 households, and 290 families residing in the city. The population density was 245.73 inhabitants per square mile (94.88/km^{2}). There were 471 housing units at an average density of 143.77 per square mile (55.51/km^{2}). The racial makeup of the city was 96.02% White, 0.25% African American, 0.37% Native American, 0.50% Asian, 0.00% Pacific Islander, 0.00% from other races, and 2.86% from two or more races. Hispanic or Latino of any race were 0.75% of the population.

There were 464 households, out of which 29.1% had children under the age of 18 living with them, 42.24% were married couples living together, 13.79% had a female householder with no husband present, and 37.50% were non-families. 34.48% of all households were made up of individuals, and 15.30% had someone living alone who was 65 years of age or older. The average household size was 2.77 and the average family size was 2.24.

The city's age distribution consisted of 25.2% under the age of 18, 4.6% from 18 to 24, 21.9% from 25 to 44, 28.9% from 45 to 64, and 19.4% who were 65 years of age or older. The median age was 44.4 years. For every 100 females, there were 111.1 males. For every 100 females age 18 and over, there were 90.4 males.

The median income for a household in the city was $47,857, and the median income for a family was $66,500. Males had a median income of $34,402 versus $35,302 for females. The per capita income for the city was $26,409. About 7.9% of families and 14.7% of the population were below the poverty line, including 19.0% of those under age 18 and 11.2% of those age 65 or over.

== Transportation ==
Amtrak’s Southwest Chief, which operates between Los Angeles and Chicago, passes through the town on BNSF tracks, but makes no stop. The nearest station is located in Fort Madison, 8 miles (13 km) to the west.

== Education ==
Residents are in Dallas Elementary School District 327 and Illini West High School District 307. The Dallas City district operates the public elementary school; it formerly was known as Dallas City Community School District #336.

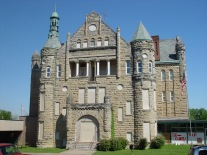
Dallas City High School

Although there is no exact date other than the early 1900s, the Dallas City High School was opened. The design of the building imitates the making of a castle. The school's nickname and mascot were the "Bulldogs", and their colors were red and black. The school's athletic teams did not fall far from greatness. Within the time it was open, the boy's teams won a total of 12 regional championships, 6 of which were earned in the 1940s.

In 2001 Dallas City High School closed and was converted into the Great River Community Center; the city government installed additional parking in front of the former high school. The Dallas City area was reassigned to Nauvoo-Colusa Community Unit School District 325 for high school, so that year 70 students and all but two of the Dallas City High teachers moved to Nauvoo-Colusa High School. In 2008 the Nauvoo-Colusa district closed its high school and redirected students to Warsaw Community Unit School District 316's Warsaw High School. Upon promoting from the eighth grade, students attend high school at Illini West in Carthage, Illinois.
