= St. Albans Township, Hancock County, Illinois =

Saint Albans Township
- Township
- Township road building in West Point

- Location in Hancock County

- Hancock County's location in Illinois
- Coordinates: 40°14′53″N 91°12′07″W
- Country: United States
- State: Illinois
- County: Hancock
- Established: November 6, 1849

Area
  - Total: 36.13 sq mi (93.6 km^{2})
  - Land: 36.00 sq mi (93.2 km^{2})
  - Water: 0.13 sq mi (0.34 km^{2}) 0.36%
- Elevation: 666 ft (203 m)

Population (2020)
  - Total: 292
  - Density: 8.11/sq mi (3.13/km^{2})
- Time zone: UTC-6 (CST)
  - Summer (DST): UTC-5 (CDT)
- ZIP codes: 62313, 62349, 62373, 62379, 62380
- FIPS code: 17-067-66612

Saint Albans Township is one of twenty-four townships in Hancock County, Illinois, USA. As of the 2020 census, its population was 292 and it contained 148 housing units.

== Geography ==
According to the 2021 census gazetteer files, St. Albans Township has a total area of 36.13 square miles (93.58 km^{2}), of which 36.00 square miles (93.24 km^{2}) (or 99.64%) is land and 0.13 square miles (0.34 km^{2}) (or 0.36%) is water.

=== Cities, towns, villages ===
- West Point

=== Landmarks ===
- Pierce Park

== Demographics ==
Historical population
Census	Pop.	Note	%±
1860	1,099		—
1870	1,147		4.4%
1880	1,284		11.9%
1890	1,263		−1.6%
1900	1,207		−4.4%
1910	1,089		−9.8%
1920	1,079		−0.9%
1930	938		−13.1%
1940	876		−6.6%
1950	756		−13.7%
1960	653		−13.6%
1970	575		−11.9%
1980	575		0.0%
1990	503		−12.5%
2000	414		−17.7%
2010	377		−8.9%
2020	292		−22.5%
U.S. Decennial Census

As of the 2020 census there were 292 people, 123 households, and 81 families residing in the township. The population density was 8.08 inhabitants per square mile (3.12/km^{2}). There were 148 housing units at an average density of 4.10 per square mile (1.58/km^{2}). The racial makeup of the township was 95.21% White, 0.34% African American, 0.00% Native American, 0.00% Asian, 0.00% Pacific Islander, 0.68% from other races, and 3.77% from two or more races. Hispanic or Latino of any race were 0.68% of the population.

There were 123 households, out of which 48.00% had children under the age of 18 living with them, 29.27% were married couples living together, 5.69% had a female householder with no spouse present, and 34.15% were non-families. 27.60% of all households were made up of individuals, and 20.30% had someone living alone who was 65 years of age or older. The average household size was 4.11 and the average family size was 4.99.

The township's age distribution consisted of 34.9% under the age of 18, 17.2% from 18 to 24, 24.6% from 25 to 44, 14.1% from 45 to 64, and 9.3% who were 65 years of age or older. The median age was 23.5 years. For every 100 females, there were 59.3 males. For every 100 females age 18 and over, there were 62.9 males.

The median income for a household in the township was $57,434, and the median income for a family was $48,313. Males had a median income of $45,724 versus $14,048 for females. The per capita income for the township was $16,359. About 35.8% of families and 51.3% of the population were below the poverty line, including 58.0% of those under age 18 and 27.7% of those age 65 or over.

== School districts ==
- Community Unit School District 4
- Southeastern Community Unit School District 337

== Political districts ==
- Illinois's 18th congressional district
- State House District 93
- State House District 94
- State Senate District 47
