= Bentley, Illinois =

- Town
- Location of Bentley in Hancock County, Illinois.
- Coordinates: 40°20′37″N 91°6′43″W
- Country: United States
- State: Illinois
- County: Hancock
- Incorporated: March 25, 1869

Area
  - Total: 0.14 sq mi (0.37 km^{2})
  - Land: 0.14 sq mi (0.37 km^{2})
  - Water: 0 sq mi (0.00 km^{2})
- Elevation: 679 ft (207 m)

Population (2020)
  - Total: 30
  - Density: 209.6/sq mi (80.94/km^{2})
- Time zone: UTC-6 (CST)
  - Summer (DST): UTC-5 (CDT)
- Zip code: 62321
- Area code: 217
- FIPS code: 17-05274
- GNIS feature ID: 2396588

Bentley (formerly Sutton) is an incorporated town in southeast Hancock County, Illinois, United States. The population was 30 at the 2020 census.

== Geography ==
Bentley is located in southeastern Hancock County. Illinois Routes 94 and 110, a four-lane highway, pass just west of the town. The highway leads north 6 miles (10 km) to Carthage, the county seat, and southwest as IL 110 36 miles (58 km) to Quincy, while IL 94 branches off to the southeast and leads to Bowen, 10 miles (16 km) from Bentley.

According to the 2021 census gazetteer files, Bentley has a total area of 0.14 square miles (0.36 km^{2}), of which 0.14 square miles (0.36 km^{2}) (or 99.31%) is land and 0.00 square miles (0.00 km^{2}) (or 0.69%) is water.

=== Climate ===
Climate data for Bentley, Illinois, 1991–2020 normals, extremes 1995–present
Month	Jan	Feb	Mar	Apr	May	Jun	Jul	Aug	Sep	Oct	Nov	Dec	Year
Record high °F (°C)	68 (20)	80 (27)	92 (33)	89 (32)	97 (36)	100 (38)	105 (41)	104 (40)	104 (40)	96 (36)	82 (28)	75 (24)	105 (41)
Mean maximum °F (°C)	58.1 (14.5)	60.0 (15.6)	74.4 (23.6)	85.1 (29.5)	90.1 (32.3)	94.3 (34.6)	95.8 (35.4)	96.5 (35.8)	93.9 (34.4)	85.0 (29.4)	73.0 (22.8)	61.3 (16.3)	98.7 (37.1)
Mean daily maximum °F (°C)	33.9 (1.1)	38.9 (3.8)	50.9 (10.5)	63.4 (17.4)	73.7 (23.2)	83.0 (28.3)	86.3 (30.2)	84.9 (29.4)	78.8 (26.0)	66.0 (18.9)	51.3 (10.7)	39.1 (3.9)	62.5 (17.0)
Daily mean °F (°C)	25.8 (−3.4)	30.3 (−0.9)	41.4 (5.2)	52.8 (11.6)	63.6 (17.6)	73.1 (22.8)	76.4 (24.7)	74.3 (23.5)	67.2 (19.6)	55.1 (12.8)	42.0 (5.6)	31.3 (−0.4)	52.8 (11.6)
Mean daily minimum °F (°C)	17.7 (−7.9)	21.7 (−5.7)	31.9 (−0.1)	42.1 (5.6)	53.4 (11.9)	63.2 (17.3)	66.5 (19.2)	63.8 (17.7)	55.5 (13.1)	44.1 (6.7)	32.8 (0.4)	23.6 (−4.7)	43.0 (6.1)
Mean minimum °F (°C)	−2.0 (−18.9)	−0.5 (−18.1)	12.2 (−11.0)	26.0 (−3.3)	38.7 (3.7)	51.4 (10.8)	56.1 (13.4)	53.3 (11.8)	42.0 (5.6)	27.9 (−2.3)	16.5 (−8.6)	4.4 (−15.3)	−6.9 (−21.6)
Record low °F (°C)	−22 (−30)	−20 (−29)	−7 (−22)	6 (−14)	29 (−2)	44 (7)	48 (9)	43 (6)	29 (−2)	18 (−8)	6 (−14)	−10 (−23)	−22 (−30)
Average precipitation inches (mm)	1.67 (42)	1.98 (50)	2.57 (65)	4.11 (104)	5.28 (134)	4.85 (123)	4.29 (109)	4.19 (106)	3.67 (93)	3.16 (80)	2.45 (62)	1.89 (48)	40.11 (1,016)
Average snowfall inches (cm)	7.6 (19)	6.3 (16)	2.1 (5.3)	0.4 (1.0)	0.0 (0.0)	0.0 (0.0)	0.0 (0.0)	0.0 (0.0)	0.0 (0.0)	0.1 (0.25)	1.4 (3.6)	5.2 (13)	23.1 (58.15)
Average precipitation days (≥ 0.01 in)	7.5	7.2	8.6	11.3	12.4	10.3	9.3	8.0	7.4	8.3	8.2	7.6	106.1
Average snowy days (≥ 0.1 in)	4.3	3.5	1.3	0.2	0.0	0.0	0.0	0.0	0.0	0.1	0.7	2.9	13.0
Source 1: NOAA
Source 2: National Weather Service (mean maxima/minima 2006–2020)

== Demographics ==
Historical population
Census	Pop.	Note	%±
1880	117		—
1890	144		23.1%
1900	138		−4.2%
1910	89		−35.5%
1920	136		52.8%
1930	113		−16.9%
1940	89		−21.2%
1950	88		−1.1%
1960	89		1.1%
1970	94		5.6%
1980	49		−47.9%
1990	36		−26.5%
2000	43		19.4%
2010	35		−18.6%
2020	30		−14.3%
U.S. Decennial Census

As of the 2020 census there were 30 people, 7 households, and 5 families residing in the town. The population density was 208.33 inhabitants per square mile (80.44/km^{2}). There were 17 housing units at an average density of 118.06 per square mile (45.58/km^{2}). The racial makeup of the town was 76.67% White, 0.00% African American, 3.33% Native American, 0.00% Asian, 0.00% Pacific Islander, 0.00% from other races, and 20.00% from two or more races. Hispanic or Latino of any race were 13.33% of the population.

There were 7 households, out of which 14.3% had children under the age of 18 living with them, 71.43% were married couples living together, none had a female householder with no husband present, and 28.57% were non-families. 28.57% of all households were made up of individuals, and 28.57% had someone living alone who was 65 years of age or older. The average household size was 3.20 and the average family size was 2.57.

The town's age distribution consisted of 16.7% under the age of 18, 11.1% from 18 to 24, 11.1% from 25 to 44, 33.3% from 45 to 64, and 27.8% who were 65 years of age or older. The median age was 58.3 years. For every 100 females, there were 200.0 males. For every 100 females age 18 and over, there were 200.0 males.

The median income for a household in the town was $74,375, and the median income for a family was $101,250. Males had a median income of $32,500 versus $53,125 for females. The per capita income for the town was $35,594. None of the population was below the poverty line.
