= Illini West High School =

High school in Carthage, Illinois

Location
- 600 Miller Street; Carthage, Illinois 62321; United States; 40.42099°N 91.13449°W

Information
- Type: Public
- School district: Illini West Community Unit School District 307
- Principal: Amanda Congdon
- Teaching staff: 24.93 (FTE)
- Grades: 9–12
- Enrollment: 334 (2023–2024)
- Student to teacher ratio: 13.40
- Campus type: Small city
- Colors: Navy blue, orange, white
- Athletics conference: West Central
- Team name: Chargers
- PSAE average: 48%
- Website: www.illiniwest.org

Illini West High School (IWHS) is a public high school in Carthage, Illinois, United States. IWHS serves a mostly rural area that includes most of northeastern Hancock County and extends into parts of Henderson and McDonough Counties, covering the cities of Carthage, Dallas City, and La Harpe, and the village of Ferris. The campus is located 25 miles (40 km) west of Macomb, Illinois, and has a student body of 332 students in grades 9–12 as of the 2017–18 school year. IWHS was established in 2007 as a convergence of Carthage, Dallas City, and La Harpe High Schools and is housed at the former Carthage High School. The school is administered by the Illini West Community Unit School District 307, while the elementary and middle feeder schools in each of the communities that consolidated are administered by the Carthage Elementary School District 317, Dallas Elementary School District 327, and La Harpe Community School District 347.

== District boundary ==
In Hancock County, the district includes that county's part of Dallas City as well as Bentley, Carthage, Ferris, La Harpe, and Pontoosuc. In Henderson County, the district includes that county's part of Dallas City, as well as Lomax.

Within Hancock County, the district includes all of Carthage, Harmony, and La Harpe townships, most of Dallas City, Durham, Fountain Green, Hancock, Pilot Grove, Prairie, and Rock Creek townships, and part of Bear Creek Township. Within Henderson County, the district includes most of Lomax and Terre Haute townships. The district extends into pieces of Blandisville Township, McDonough County.

== Academics ==
In 2009 Illini West High School did not make Adequate Yearly Progress, with 48% of students meeting standards, on the Prairie State Achievement Examination, a state test that is part of the No Child Left Behind Act. The school's average high school graduation rate between 2008 and 2009 was 100%.

== Athletics ==
Illini West High School competes in the Prairieland Conference and is a member school in the Illinois High School Association. The IWHS mascot is the Chargers, symbolized by a horse, with school colors of navy blue and orange. The school has 4 state championships on record in team athletics and activities, Boys Football in 2008-2009 (3A) and 2010-2011 (3A), Bass Fishing in 2010, Girls Track 2015 (1A), and Boys Track 2017 (1A). However, predecessor high school won 6 more state championships: Boys Football in 1995-1996 (1A), 1998-1999 (1A), 1999-2000 (1A), and 2000-2001 (1A), as Carthage High School; Girls Basketball in 1991-1992 (A); and Girls Basketball in 1992-1993 (A) as Carthage High School.

== Rivalry (West Hancock) ==
Illini West High school Rivalry with West Hancock date back to when the Chargers were still the Blueboys and the Titans were the Cardinals.

== History ==
The Illini West High School formed in 2007. It was the convergence of Carthage High School, Dallas City High School, and La Harpe High School. The converged school used the Carthage High School building as its new home.
