= U.S. Route 136 in Iowa =

Highway in Iowa

U.S. Highway 136
- Great River Road
- US 136 highlighted in red

Route information
- Maintained by Iowa DOT
- Length: 3.591 mi (5.779 km)
- Existed: 1951–present

Major junctions
- West end: US 61 / US 136 southwest of Keokuk
- US 218 in Keokuk
- East end: US 136 east of Keokuk

Location
- Country: United States
- State: Iowa
- Counties: Lee

Highway system
- United States Numbered Highway System; List; Special; Divided; Iowa Primary Highway System; Interstate; US; State; Secondary; Scenic
← Iowa 130	→ Iowa 136

U.S. Highway 136 (US 136) is a short U.S. Highway in Keokuk, Iowa. The route was designated nationally in 1951 and has remained largely unchanged through Keokuk since then. The highway originally crossed the Mississippi on the Keokuk Rail Bridge, which was the second bridge built and operated by Andrew Carnegie's Keokuk & Hamilton Bridge Company in that location. While it was designed for wagons and early automobiles, crossing the rail bridge became difficult in larger modern vehicles, specifically semi trucks. As a result, a new automobile-only bridge was built directly to the south of the older span. The Keokuk–Hamilton Bridge opened in 1985 eight months early and under budget.

== Route description ==
US 136 begins on a bridge over the Des Moines River with US 61. The river's mouth on the Mississippi River is visible to the southeast of the bridge. After landing on the Iowa side of the river, the two routes curve to the east. US 61 splits off to the north and its business route begins along US 136. Entering the town from the west along 7th Street, the highway passes between two pillars which mark the northeastern corner of Rees Park.

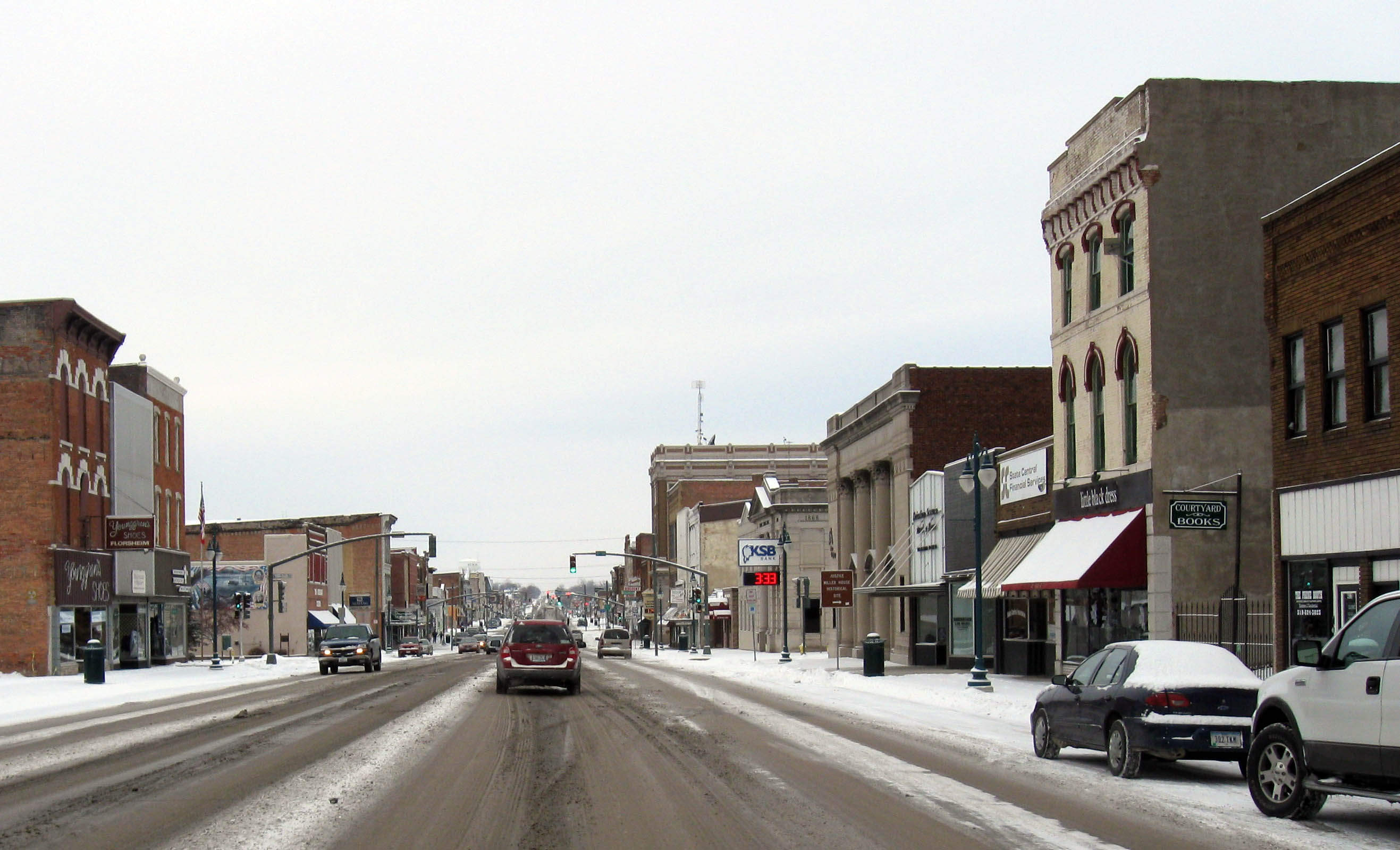
Looking northwest on Keokuk's Main Street

The routes continue east past an old school which hides the city's 4-million-US-gallon (15 ML) water tower. The 160-foot-high (49 m) tower was the second largest elevated storage tank in the United States when it came online in December 2011. It then crosses a bridge which connects two bluffs, underneath which a single line of the Keokuk Junction Railway passes. The routes descend a hill as they head towards downtown; they climb another until the intersection with Main Street.

At Main Street, US 136 and US 61 Business part ways. The business route turns to the northwest onto US 218 which begins its 320-mile (510 km) journey northward. US 136 turns to the southeast towards the Mississippi River. At the intersection with US 218, there are no directional signs for US 136. Instead, because of the southeast–to–northwest orientation of the city, westbound US 136 is listed as pointed towards Missouri and eastbound as pointed towards Illinois. After running through the southern part of downtown, it crosses the Mississippi on the Keokuk–Hamilton Bridge, which is adjacent to the older Keokuk Rail Bridge. From both bridges, Lock and Dam No. 19 and its hydroelectric power plant dominate the northern view of the river.

== History ==
In the late 1860s, Andrew Carnegie's Keystone Bridge Company built the original Keokuk and Hamilton Bridge in the same location as the Keokuk Rail Bridge. It was a 20-foot-wide (6.1 m), steel truss bridge that had one set of tracks and two lanes for wagon traffic. Pedestrian traffic was cantilevered out five feet (1.5 m) on either side of the trusses. A swing span on the Keokuk side allowed river traffic to cross. When the bridge opened in 1871, the first locomotive to cross the bridge crushed the pivot point of the swing span. It was replaced a few days later. Ten years later, War Eagle, a river steamer sank after it collided with a fixed span of the bridge. Both the ship and bridge span were destroyed. Until the span was replaced, a wooden, covered bridge was built in its place.

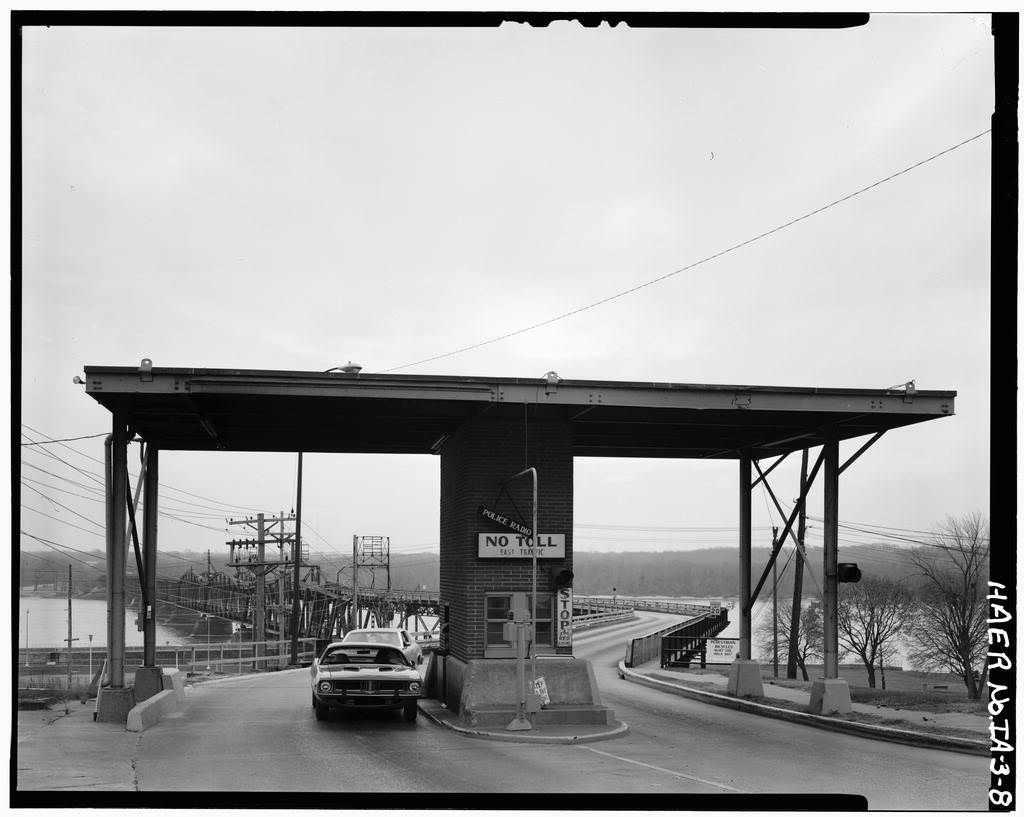
Prior to 1985, US 136 crossed the Mississippi River on the Keokuk Rail Bridge

The second bridge, now known as the Keokuk Rail Bridge, was built in the 1910s when modern trains were pushing the bridge's 35-short-ton (32 t) load capacity. Keokuk businessmen coerced Carnegie's Keokuk & Hamilton Bridge Company, the owners of the original bridge who thought their bridge was adequate, to rebuild their bridge by threatening to build a new span on the new dam being built near the bridge. However, a new bridge over the new dam would require congressional approval, in the form of House Resolution 26672. After hearings before the House Committee on Interstate and Foreign Commerce, the committee chairman urged "the Keokuk & Hamilton Bridge Co. would reconstruct its bridge, or he would recommend passage of House Resolution 26672." The bridge company relented and planning began almost immediately.

The bridge company contracted with Ralph Modjeski to design the new bridge. Modjeski determined that the original bridge was indeed overstressed for rail traffic. He proposed two options: a single-track rail bridge with a roadway above the tracks or a bridge similar to the original but built to modern standards. The latter option was chosen. The piers of the bridge were cut down five feet (1.5 m) and recapped. The 20-foot-6-inch-wide (6.25 m) bridge was built between 1914 and 1915 and opened for traffic in 1916. The original roadway was made of wood, but was replaced by steel mesh in 1956.

US 136 was designated nationally in 1951. In the Keokuk area, it was overlaid upon US 61 from west of Alexandria, Missouri, over the Des Moines River into Iowa, and into downtown Keokuk. South of downtown, it replaced Iowa 161, which crossed the Mississippi River on the Keokuk Rail Bridge. Since its designation, the route has largely remained the same. However, the eastern end changed slightly with the opening of the Keokuk–Hamilton Bridge in 1985.

In the 1970s, politicians on both sides of the river began to seek funding to build a new road bridge across the river. The rail bridge, while still adequate for rail traffic, it proved to be a challenge for drivers. The western terminus of the bridge featured a curve which was navigated easily by wagons and early automobiles, but was dangerous for semi trucks. Governor Terry Branstad was convinced a new bridge was needed after riding in a railcar to view the underside of the road deck. The new, four-lane Keokuk–Hamilton bridge opened on November 23, 1985, nearly eight months ahead of schedule and under budget.

== Major intersections ==
The entire route is in Keokuk, Lee County.

mi	km	Destinations	Notes
0.000	0.000	US 61 south / US 136 west / Great River Road south – Kahoka, Canton	Continuation into Missouri (Des Moines River crossing)
0.546	0.879	US 61 north / US 218 – Fort Madison US 61 Bus. begins	Northern end of US 61 overlap; southern end of US 61 Business overlap
2.996	4.822	US 218 north / US 61 Bus. north (Main Street west)	Northern end of US 61 Business overlap; national southern end of US 218
		4th Street / Great River Road north	
3.591	5.779	US 136 east / Great River Road (National Route) north (Keokuk–Hamilton Bridge) – Illinois	Continuation into Illinois (Mississippi River crossing)
1.000 mi = 1.609 km; 1.000 km = 0.621 mi: Concurrency terminus

== Works cited ==
- Bowers, Martha H.; Muessig, Hans (1982). "Keokuk and Hamilton Bridge" (PDF). Historic American Engineering Record. Washington, D.C.: Library of Congress.

U.S. Route 136
Previous state: Missouri	Iowa	Next state: Illinois
