= U.S. Route 61 in Iowa =

U.S. Highway in Iowa

U.S. Highway 61
- US 61 highlighted in red

Route information
- Maintained by Iowa DOT
- Length: 192.663 mi (310.061 km)
- Existed: July 1, 1926–present

Major junctions
- South end: US 61 / US 136 south of Keokuk
- US 218 at Keokuk; US 34 at Burlington; I-80 at Davenport; US 30 at DeWitt; US 151 south of Dubuque; US 20 at Dubuque
- North end: US 61 / US 151 at Dubuque

Location
- Country: United States
- State: Iowa
- Counties: Lee; Des Moines; Louisa; Muscatine; Scott; Clinton; Jackson; Dubuque

Highway system
- United States Numbered Highway System; List; Special; Divided; Iowa Primary Highway System; Interstate; US; State; Secondary; Scenic
← Iowa 60	→ Iowa 62

U.S. Highway 61 (US 61) is a United States Highway that serves eastern Iowa. It enters the state from Missouri near Keokuk with US 136. North of Keokuk, it is overlapped by US 218 for a few miles. It the follows the course of the Mississippi River past Montrose and Fort Madison. It meets US 34 at Burlington. It passes through Wapello and bypasses Muscatine and Blue Grass on its way toward Davenport. There, it follows Interstate 280 (I-280) and I-80 around the Quad Cities. North of Davenport, it follows a freeway north toward DeWitt where it meets US 30. The highway continues north through Maquoketa and reaches the Dubuque area. There it is joined by US 151 and briefly by US 52. The two highways enter the downtown area on an expressway. Due to the proximity of the Mississippi River and railroad tracks that lie between, the routes have an indirect junction with US 20. The two highways leave the state and enter Wisconsin about one-half mile (800 m) north of the Illinois–Wisconsin state line.

The route that would become US 61 was organized as a branch of the Burlington Way. Then in 1920, the Iowa State Highway Commission organized the primary road system, which assigned the branch of the Burlington Way that passed through Davenport and Dubuque a route number: Primary Road No. 20. Six years later, the U.S. Highway System was created and most of No. 20 was renumbered US 61. The early U.S. Highways passed through every town within a reasonable distance along the route. Road construction projects that began in the 1950s sought to rebuild and straighten all across the state. As traffic increased in populated areas, the highway commission started building four-lane highways like Kerrigan Road in Dubuque. In the 1970s, work began to widen US 61 to four lanes in rural parts of the state. The freeway section between Davenport and DeWitt opened in 1975. Muscatine was bypassed by a four-lane road in the 1980s. In Dubuque, the aging Eagle Point Bridge was in need of replacement, so US 61 and US 151 traffic was rerouted through East Dubuque, Illinois, until the Dubuque–Wisconsin Bridge opened in 1982. Shortly thereafter work commenced on connecting the new bridge to Kerrigan Road via downtown Dubuque.

Through the mid-1990s and early-2000s, road construction projects consisted of twinning existing rural parts of US 61. A bypass of Maquoketa was built and the four-lane road was extended north from DeWitt to Dubuque by the end of the 1990s. South of Davenport, a four-lane connection to Muscatine was completed while bypassing Blue Grass. More recently, US 61 was rerouted out of downtown Davenport because a low-clearance railroad bridge had a tendency to get hit by semi truck drivers who misjudged the height of their trucks. In the 2010s, a bypass of Fort Madison opened and twinning projects began again south of Muscatine.

== Route description ==
US 61 and US 136 begin their courses in Iowa on a bridge over the Des Moines River southwest of Keokuk. Once on land, the highway turns towards the east and US 61 splits away to the north along a bypass. U.S. Route 61 Business (US 61 Business) continues east with US 136. The bypass ends at US 218, which is also the northern end of the business route. From there, US 61 and US 218 head north together along a four-lane divided highway and past Keokuk's airport. Near Montrose, US 218 exits the highway and heads northwest towards Donnellson. Between Montose and Fort Madison, the road runs along the western bank of the Mississippi River. The Nauvoo Illinois Temple, which sits atop a hill across the river in Nauvoo, Illinois, can be seen from US 61. As the highway nears Fort Madison, it moves away from the river in order to bypass the city.

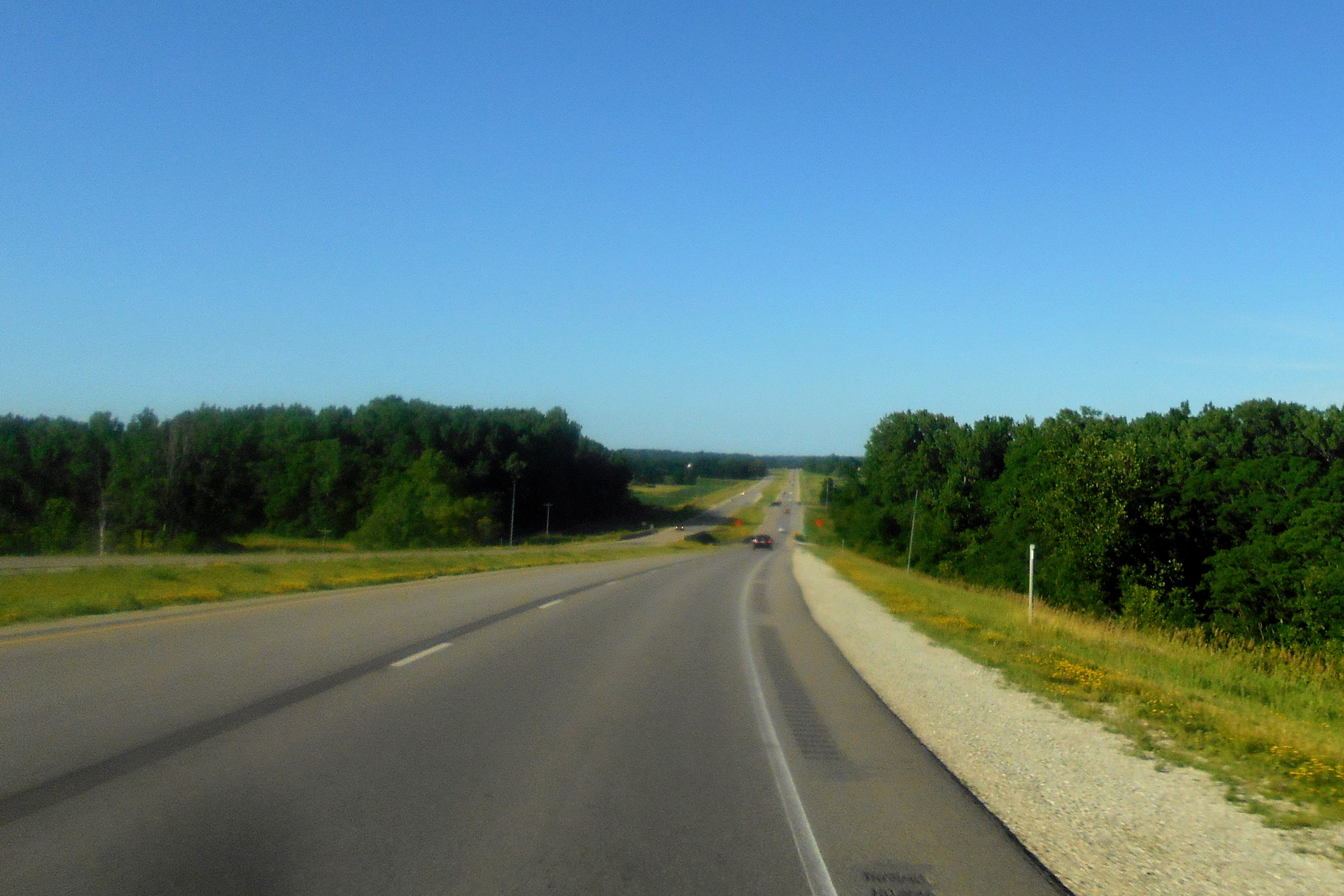
US 61 near Fort Madison

Four interchanges provide access to Fort Madison from the west and north. Iowa 2, which ends at US 61, and US 61 Business, which begins here, is the first interchange on the western side of the city. The County Road J40 (CR J40) interchange connects to both downtown Fort Madison to the south and West Point to the northwest. Exits for CR X32 and the back side of US 61 Business, which provide access to the municipal airport and Iowa State Penitentiary, respectively, complete Fort Madison's grade-separated junctions.

Shortly thereafter, the highway turns to the northeast and passes by Wever, where it meets the eastern end of Iowa 16 and crosses the Skunk River. The road then turns north and enters the Burlington area. The highway roughly separates Burlington to the east and West Burlington to the west. An interchange with US 34 and Iowa 163 is the only intersection with a numbered highway in the Burlington area.

North of Burlington, US 61 heads north and slightly northwest. It passes through Dodgeville and Mediapolis. Shortly after crossing into Louisa County, it meets the eastern end of Iowa 78 east of Morning Sun. The highway crosses the Iowa River just north of Wapello. At Grandview, US 61 is joined from the west by Iowa 92. The highways then continue north then turn to the northeast to descend onto Muscatine Island, a sandy plain known for growing conditions ideal for melons, particularly muskmelons.

On the southwestern edge of Muscatine, US 61 and Iowa 92 turn off of the highway onto a bypass of city. US 61 Business continues northeasterly from the intersection. The bypass forms a near-180 degree squared arc around the city. Near the halfway mark of the road around Muscatine, the two highways are joined by Iowa 22. The highway then turns to the east, where it roughly marks the northern city limit. The bypass ends at an intersection with Iowa 38 and the other end of US 61 Business. There, both Iowa 22 and Iowa 92 follow Iowa 38 toward the city's riverfront.

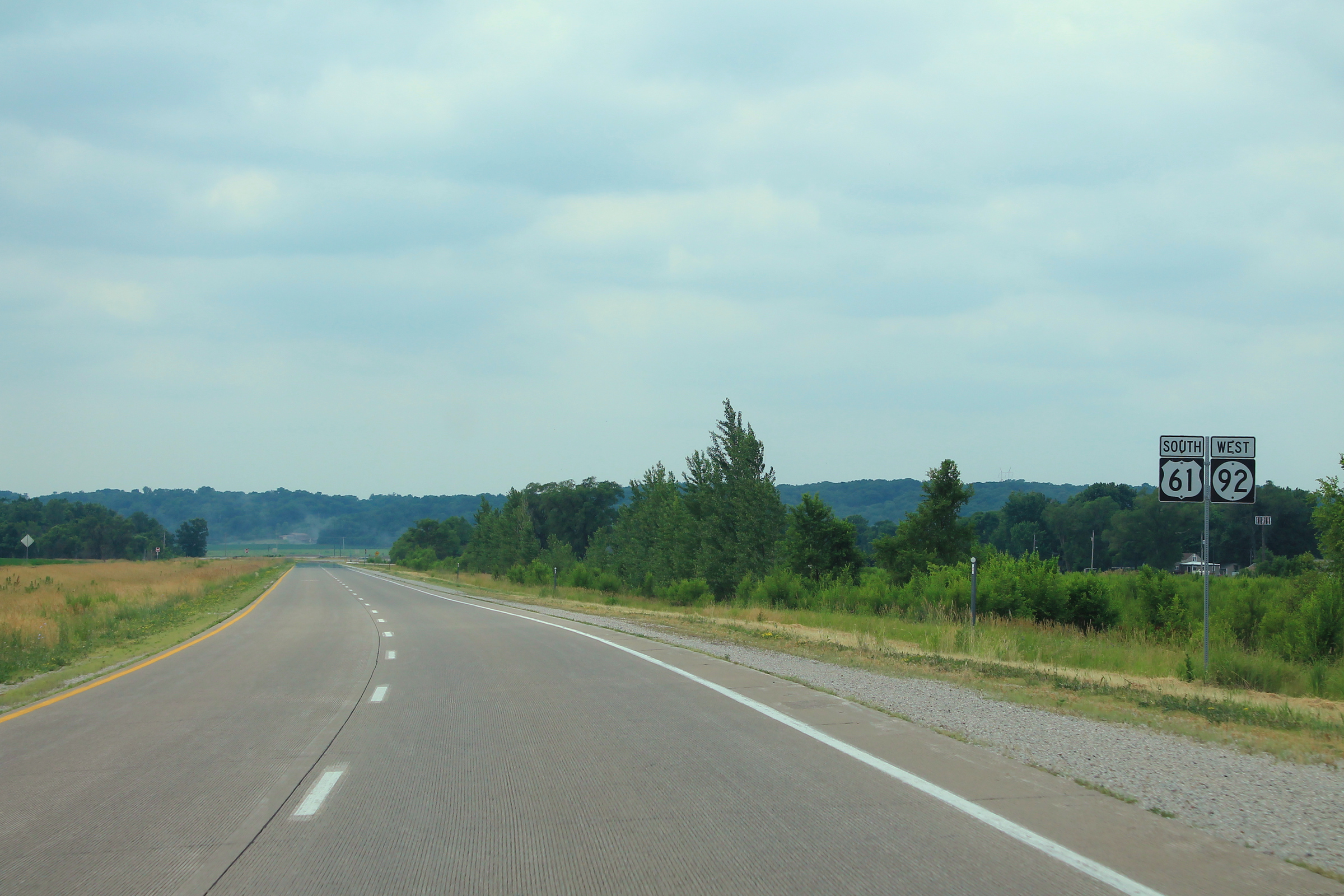
US 61 and Iowa 92 south of Muscatine

US 61 continues to the northeast along a four-lane expressway; two exits provide access to Blue Grass. A few miles east of Blue Grass, the highway meets and turns north onto Interstate 280 (I-280). US 61 Business, officially known as Iowa 461, continues east into Davenport. I-280 and US 61 head north along the western edge of Davenport. At the Kimberly Road exit, they are briefly joined by US 6. About seven-tenths mile (1.1 km) later, I-280 ends at an interchange with I-80. Westbound US 6 follows westbound I-80 and northbound US 61 follows eastbound I-80. About five and a half miles (8.9 km) later, US 61 exits from I-80 and rejoins the northern end of US 61 Business.

Heading north again, US 61 travels along a freeway that passes Mount Joy and the Davenport Municipal Airport toward Eldridge. It descends into a valley and crosses the Wapsipinicon River and into Clinton County. Upon reaching DeWitt there is a trumpet interchange, which is the southern junction with US 30. That highway heads eastbound from the interchange toward Clinton and the Mississippi River. A little over a mile later (2 km), US 30 exits to the west toward Grand Mound and Cedar Rapids; an older alignment of US 30 heads east into DeWitt. The freeway continues due north for a little while; it downgrades to an expressway at an intersection with the former routing of US 61 between DeWitt and Welton.

The highway heads to the north-northwest as it snakes around Welton and a collection of houses that built along the old roadway. West of Delmar is an interchange with Iowa 136. As the highway approaches Maquoketa, it takes a hard curve to the west and meets Main Street at a folded diamond interchange. It then takes another hard turn back to the north and intersects Iowa 64. Shortly thereafter, it crosses the Maquoketa River. As it continues north, US 61 passes the Hurstville Historic District, where lime was manufactured in kilns which are visible from the highway. The road passes by the unincorporated towns of Fulton and Otter Creek and through Zwingle, the latter town lies on the Jackson–Dubuque county line.

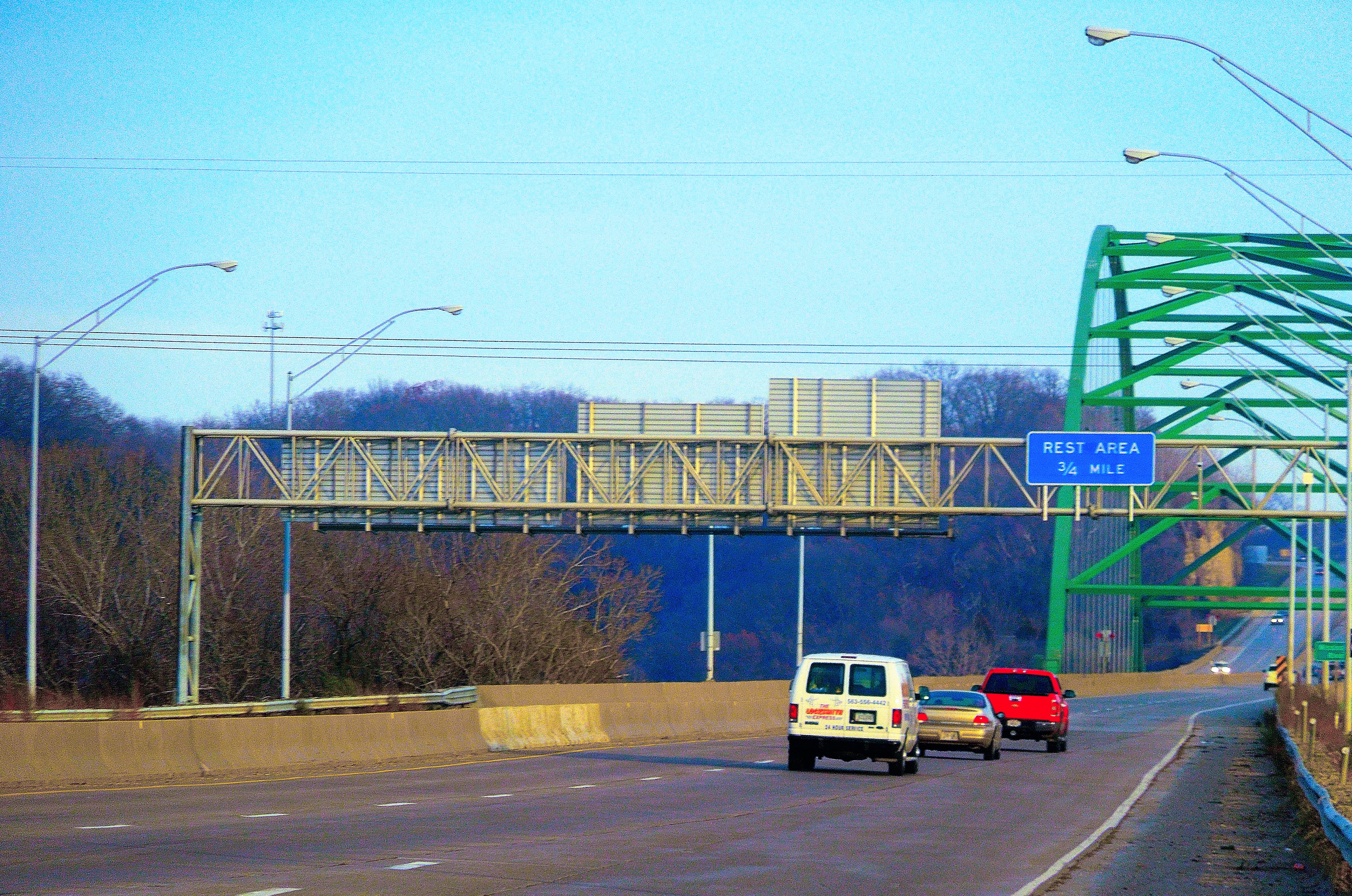
US 61 / US 151 as they cross the Mississippi River into Wisconsin

Now in Dubuque County for the rest of its journey through Iowa, US 61 still follows a largely due-north course. It passes the Dubuque Regional Airport shortly before descending a long hill and meeting US 151 at a trumpet interchange. US 151 joins US 61 from the southwest where it leads to Cascade and Cedar Rapids. Shortly thereafter, the two highways come to an interchange with US 52. The Southwest Arterial expressway opened in 2020. The three highways enter the Dubuque area together and the city begins to build up around the roadway. US 52, which provides access to the Mines of Spain and the Julien Dubuque gravesite monument, exits the other two highways on Dubuque's south side. US 61 and US 151 continue north into the heart of Dubuque.

As they descend into Dubuque's riverfront, the Locust Street exit provides direct access to US 20. Direct access from US 61 / US 151 is not possible due to the location of the Julien Dubuque Bridge landing, which is shifted away from the river bank in order to clear a rail yard. There are two stoplights in downtown Dubuque; one of which provides access to an industrial area along the river and the other is the opposite end of the US 20 connector road. The northern intersection is adjacent to downtown Dubuque and also has a connection to the Port of Dubuque, which is otherwise inaccessible from the expressway. From there, the highway elevates over the city while heading to the northeast and curving to the east as it reaches the Mississippi River. It crosses the Dubuque–Wisconsin Bridge and the two highways enter Wisconsin.

== History ==
What is now known as US 61 has been used, under various names, for over 100 years. The route was first organized as a branch of the Burlington Way in 1916 during the Good Roads Movement. Then it was maintained by as association that solicited donations from people who lived along the route. In 1920, the Iowa General Assembly enacted a primary road bill that shifted maintenance of highways in the state from associations to Iowa's 99 counties. At this time, the Davenport-to-Dubuque branch of the Mississippi Valley Highway, as the Burlington Way as known by then, was designated Primary Road No. 20. That number between the Missouri state line and Dubuque was replaced by US 61 when the U.S. Highway System was created in 1926.

In 1931, the Iowa State Highway Commission declared Iowa was no longer a mud road state. Most highways in the state were either fully paved or graveled; only a small portion of road in Louisa County was not yet paved. The highway commission began projects to modernize the original highways that were paved in the 1930s; in populated area, that meant four-lane roads. As early as 1958, an 11-member road study committee recommended the construction of a state freeway system not to exceed 2,000 miles (3,200 km) in length. This freeway system included sections of US 34 between Ottumwa and Burlington. Ten years later, the Iowa State Highway Commission approved a freeway-expressway system that would complement the Interstate Highway System under construction. Fuel conservation spurred by the oil crisis of 1973, increasing inflation, and decreased federal revenues caused the commission to reduce the number of projects undertaken by nearly 50%.

As the Interstate Highway System was under construction, officials in Dubuque lamented their city's exclusion from the system. Dubuque was the largest city in Iowa to not have a high-speed connection to an Interstate Highway, even though it was the crossroads of four U.S. Highways: US 20, which was the only east–west U.S. Highway, and US 52, US 151, and US 61. From 1934 to 1967, there were five as US 67 ended in Dubuque as well. Construction on rural four-lane roads did not begin in earnest until the 1970s when a section of freeway was built between Davenport and DeWitt. In the early 1980s, following the recommendations of a 27-member task force organized by Governor Robert D. Ray, the DOT shifted its priorities from expansion of the primary highway system to maintenance of existing highways. A five-year plan released by the DOT in January 1980 only called for 60 miles (97 km) of highway reconstruction across the state. In Lee County alone, $22.5 million (equivalent to $72 million in 2024), allocated in 1978 for five projects, were removed from the 1980 plan. Another $16 million (equivalent to $51 million in 2024) was cut in March 1980 as a result of higher than expected inflation. Larger projects that bypassed cities or built expressways through cities occurred in the 1980s and early 1990s. Through the rest of the 1990s, twinning of rural parts of US 61 finally connected Dubuque to the Interstate Highway System.

=== Burlington Way ===
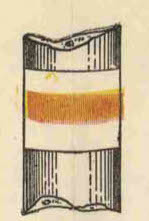
Burlington Way
- Mississippi Valley Highway
- Location: Burlington to Cresco
- Length: 409 mi (658 km)
- Existed: 1916–1926

The Burlington Way, also known as the Orange and White Way, was a 2,000-mile-long (3,200 km) auto trail that ran from New Orleans to Ely, Minnesota. Through Iowa, the trail entered the state from Illinois at Burlington and exited into Minnesota near Cresco; it traveled 409 miles (658 km) through eastern Iowa by way of Iowa City, Cedar Rapids and Oelwein. Another unofficial leg of the route began in Davenport and traveled through Dubuque; the two branches converged in Cresco. The highway was marked on every telegraph pole along the route with a 4-inch (10 cm) stripe of orange paint surrounded by 4-inch stripes of white paint.

In early 1917, two men, one of whom designated himself a promoter and the other a supervisor, filled out the registration paperwork with and paid the $5 fee (equivalent to $126 in 2025) to the Iowa State Highway Commission in order to have their route recognized by the commission. This application was rejected because the 1913 state law required the route association president and secretary to sign off on the registration, neither of whom did so. The following month the president and secretary re-submitted the application, but it was not immediately processed. The second application called for two roughly parallel routes, one from Burlington to Cresco through Cedar Rapids and another from Davenport to Cresco via Dubuque, to both carry the Burlington Way colors. The highway commission balked at the second application for two reasons. The first was because the southern half of the western leg overlapped the Red Ball Route, which Burlington Way organizers stated they had support from the Red Ball Route Association. The second, and most contentious reason, was because there were two routes. State officials interpreted the road law to mean that an association could only sponsor one highway. Both sides exchanged letters for months until the conflict was resolved. The Burlington Way's registration with the Iowa State Highway Commission was made official on December 1, 1917. Only the western leg of the route was approved. At a meeting in Jacksonville, Illinois on February 22, 1919, the executive members Burlington Way Good Roads Association voted to add the eastern Iowa leg of the highway anyway.

At their annual meeting held in September 1919 at Jackson, Tennessee, members of the Burlington Way Good Roads Association voted to change the name of the highway to the Mississippi Valley Highway. Association members sought to make the route more known to travelers by naming the route after the Mississippi Valley than after Burlington, where it crossed the river. The change was made official on October 20, 1919, at another meeting in St. Louis. Pursuant to state law at the time, the newly renamed Mississippi Valley Highway had to be re-registered with the highway commission. That registration took place on September 17, 1920. Not long after, a caravan of Mississippi Valley Highway Association members traveled the length of the road through Iowa on their way to the annual meeting held in St. Paul, Minnesota. Prior to the tour, work was done to freshen up the wayfinding paint on poles and to put up signs along the route. Promoters sought to make the road the best marked highway in the country.

=== Primary roads ===
Primary Road No. 20
- Location: Keokuk to near Cresco
- Length: 324 mi (521 km)
- Existed: 1920–1926

In 1919, the Iowa General Assembly passed a bill that created a fund for improving and hard-surfacing nearly 6,300 miles (10,100 km) of primary roads in the state. The new primary road system was to connect every city and town with at least 1000 inhabitants. The bill gave Iowa's 99 counties the responsibility for maintaining the roads, which had previously fallen upon road associations that sponsored their respective highways. The new primary roads were assigned route numbers, a trend in other Midwestern states. Route numbers were painted onto telegraph and telephone poles in order to guide travelers without the need for maps. Primary Road No. 20 (No. 20) was the easternmost north–south highway through most of the state. It was designated along River Drive Boulevard from Keokuk to Fort Madison, the Corn Belt Highway from Fort Madison to Burlington, the Mississippi Valley Highway western leg from Burlington to Muscatine, and the Great White Way from Muscatine to Davenport. North of Davenport, No. 20 followed the eastern leg of the Mississippi Valley Highway, which traveled through Dubuque and then traveled northwest toward Cresco.

=== U.S. Highway origins ===

In the mid-1920s, automobile associations continued to sponsor their named routes—there were 64 such named routes in Iowa—on top of the route numbers given by the state highway commission. This proved to be more confusing than helpful to the casual traveler, so in 1924, the American Association of State Highway Officials (AASHO, later AASHTO) called for a national system of interstate highways. Of the 75,884 miles (122,123 km) proposed by AASHO, nearly 3,000 miles (4,800 km) were allocated to Iowa. Across the country, support for the system was nearly unanimous among state highway officials and the new national routings and route numbers were assigned in 1925. The Iowa State Highway Commission chose to renumber a few highways as to not have conflicting route numbers along important routes. U.S. Highway 61 (US 61) was designated along Primary Road No. 20 from Keokuk to Dubuque. North of Dubuque, US 55 was designated along the remainder of No. 20. Once the U.S. Highway System was established, the automobile association-sponsored roads gradually disappeared.

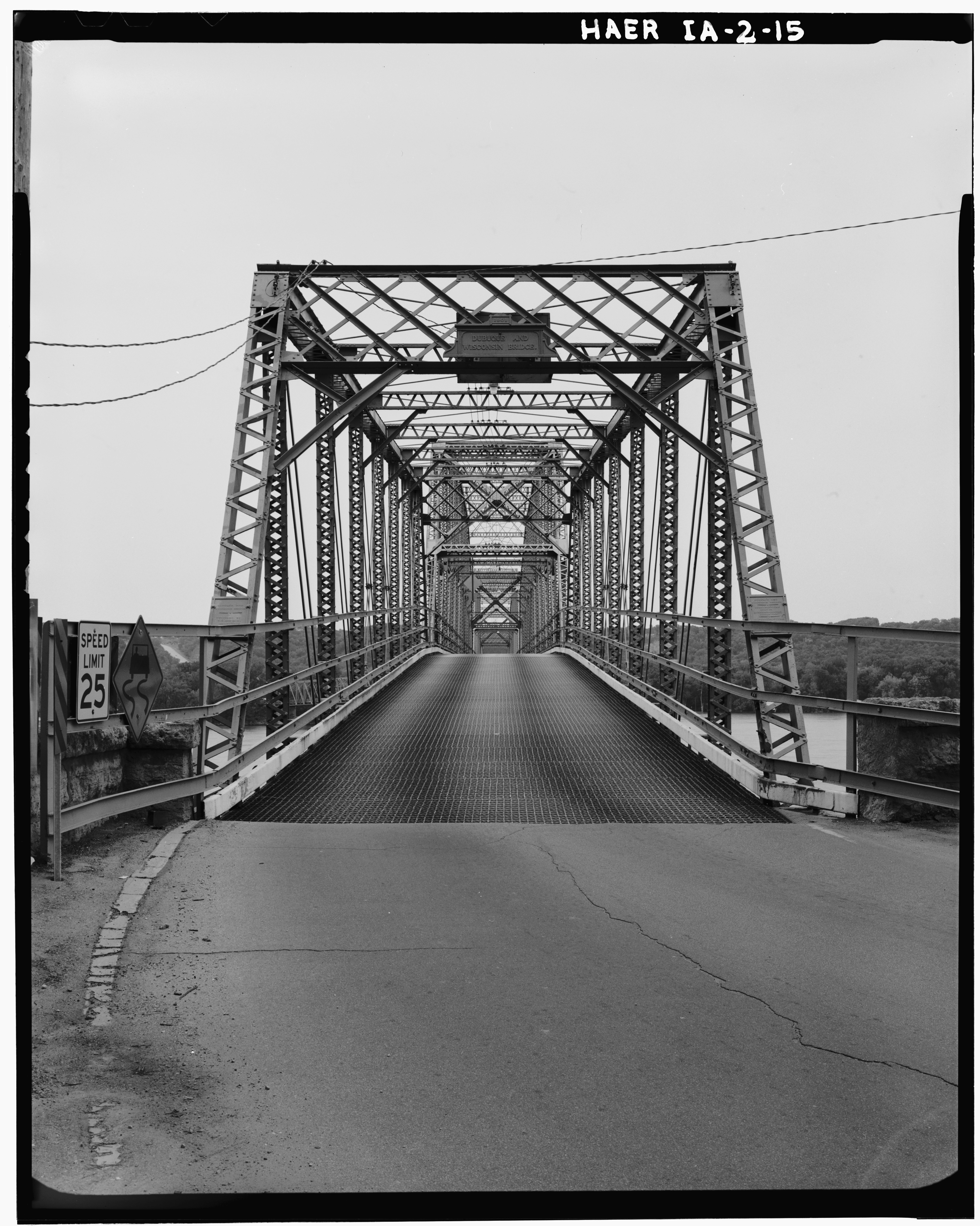
The Eagle Point Bridge as viewed from the Iowa landing

Upon designation, the only rural portions of US 61 that were paved were from the Muscatine–Scott county line near Buffalo through Davenport to DeWitt and from Key West to Dubuque. In 1930, the Iowa State Highway Commission spent $64 million (equivalent to $954 million in 2024 dollars) across the state on road works projects. On the back of the 1931 state highway map, the commission declared that Iowa was no longer a mud road state. Along US 61, only the section between Letts and Mediapolis had yet to be paved; that section was a gravel road. By the end of 1932, the entire highway was paved.

=== Early upgrades ===
Work began in the 1950s to modernize Iowa's highway system, mostly by straightening and widening the original highways built in the 1930s. In Des Moines County, work began to move US 61 out of downtown Burlington and onto Roosevelt Avenue in 1955. The new road connected to a wider section of US 61 at Spring Grove that traveled to Fort Madison. Widening work was also progressing from Burlington north to Grandview. The completed project created a continuous 24-foot-wide (7.3 m) highway from Fort Madison to Muscatine. In 1957, the Iowa State Highway Commission began work on a project to extend River Drive in western Davenport to the intersection of Iowa 22 and US 61. It was to be a four-lane divided highway with 12-foot-wide (3.7 m) lanes. An interchange was planned for the intersection with Iowa 22. As work progressed on River Drive, another contract was let to improve and widen Iowa 22 from the new River Drive interchange to Blue Grass. Work had already finished on improving the road from Blue Grass to Muscatine the year before. Upon completion of the project, US 61 and Iowa 22 switched routes between Muscatine and Davenport; US 61 now traveled along the improved highway.

In Lee County, ISHC engineers proposed relocating US 61 to the west and away from the river between Montrose and Fort Madison in April 1956. Local leaders countered with a proposal to utilize and upgrade the present highway by bypassing Montrose slightly and reworking a series of curves outside of Fort Madison. The commission favored the western route because it meant only building one railroad crossing while improving the old route would require two crossings. The western route would also require the state to purchase nine miles (14 km) of right-of-way through farmland, which the delegation from Lee County strongly opposed. The commission assured the Lee County residents that it would take their concerns into account. When the commission held hearings regarding the relocated highway in October 1956, the western route had been scrapped and the alternative proposed by the Lee County delegation was the preferred route. Paving work between Montrose and Fort Madison was scheduled for 1959. Rubble from the old highway was taken to Montrose and used to construct a harbor on the Mississippi River. By the end of September 1960, the new road was ready to go. The contractor working on the project reported that only finishing touches needed to be done. After the bypass opened, the state highway commissioned retained parts of the former US 61 in the primary highway system. South of Montrose, it became Iowa 404; to the north it became the unsigned Iowa 998.

A bypass of Keokuk was also considered in early 1957. The highway commission wanted to remove truck traffic from Keokuk's downtown area. Area businessmen felt moving US 61 away from the city center would divert revenue to neighboring states. They were also concerned by the plan to make the bypass access controlled. The businessmen thought that by limiting where vehicles could enter the bypass, the potential for commerce would also be limited. The local concerns here did not dissuade the highway commission as land for the bypass was purchased in August 1957. The Keokuk bypass opened to traffic in late 1959. The old routing of US 61 through Keokuk remained on the primary highway system. The state highway commission ruled in 1957 that US 61 and US 218 were to follow the bypass around the city meaning maintenance of Main Street would revert to the city. The state reversed their decision in 1959 shortly before the bypass opened and left US 218 on the original routing.

=== Kerrigan Road ===
By the 1950s, traffic from the four U.S. Highways that entered Dubuque from the south were creating traffic issues on Rockdale Road. Officials sought to remedy traffic by building a four-lane road from Key West, where US 61 and US 151 met, to the Julien Dubuque Bridge approach in downtown Dubuque. Through downtown, Central Avenue and White Street were converted to a one-way couplet in 1956. Plans were to have two 12-foot (3.7 m) lanes in each direction, separated by a 4-foot (1.2 m) dividing strip, carry traffic on a new road to the south and east of Rockdale Road. Some noted that the median would block access to Grandview Park's main entrance to southbound traffic, but that was remedied by building another park entrance off of Grandview Avenue, which was to get a grade separation over the new road. Road grading took place during 1956 and paving occurred through mid-1957. The expanded road opened to traffic on September 26, 1957, after a short program honoring Frank Kerrigan, a state highway commissioner from Dubuque who championed the new road before his death in 1955. The road was named Kerrigan Road in his honor and a 15-by-20-inch (38 by 51 cm) memorial plaque was placed at the intersection of Southern Avenue and the new highway.

Between Maquoketa and Dubuque, US 61 was a narrow, winding road, only 18 feet (5.5 m) wide, where it was not uncommon for cars to be stuck behind larger trucks for miles at a time. At Zwingle, in particular, the road descended a series of hills into the town only to have a narrow bridge at the nadir. Plans to straighten US 61 were already in the works when a semi hauling 16 short tons (14 LT; 15 t) of powdered milk jackknifed and substantially damaged a bridge over Tarecoat Creek (Note: The article incorrectly lists the creek as Terrico Creek.) near Otter Creek. Right away the bridge was closed to heavy traffic, but it was closed to all traffic by the next morning. US 61 traffic was detoured 33 miles (53 km) from Maquoketa to Dubuque via Bellevue. The bridge was repaired and reopened to all traffic within two months.

At Dubuque, the new road to Maquoketa connected to Kerrigan Road near Key West. Plans in 1964 called for the four-lane road to be extended south toward the Dubuque Municipal Airport. An interchange was to be built just north of the airport which would allow US 151 to follow the four-lane road south from Kerrigan Road to the interchange. Twelve miles (19 km) of highway in Dubuque County were slated to be paved in 1965 while in Jackson County preparations were being made to pave 15.5 miles (24.9 km) the next year. South of the interchange, US 61 was a two-lane road to Maquoketa. Climbing lanes were installed as necessary to allow safe passage around slower traffic. The new road shaved two miles (3.2 km) off of the trip between Dubuque and Maquoketa by bypassing small towns and eliminating sharp curves along the way. Travel times between the cities was reduced from 45 minutes to 30 minutes. It opened to traffic on December 11, 1967.

A month after the new road opened, city officials in Maquoketa complained about US 61 motorists running a four-way stop at the intersection with Iowa 64. Traffic on Iowa 64 carried speed limits of 25 and 45 miles per hour (40 and 70 km/h) on either side of the crossing while US 61 had a 70 mph (115 km/h) speed limit. Inadequate warning for the upcoming stop and the high speeds leading up to the intersection were the main culprits of the danger. In response, the highway commission placed the stop ahead signs 1,200 feet (370 m) from the intersection and added black-and-white reflectorized boards and red flags to make them more conspicuous.

=== Freeway construction ===
The segment of US 61 from Davenport to Dubuque, sometimes labeled "Iowa 561" or "US 561", was to be built up to freeway standards. Through the early 1970s, the highway commission began buying right-of-way for the location of the new highway. A bypass around De Witt which consisting of overlapping sections of US 30 and US 61, was open to traffic in November 1975. It was around this time that the highway commission began to scale back highway construction projects. The Iowa Transportation Commission, which became the Iowa Department of Transportation (Iowa DOT) in 1975, received a $15 million grant (equivalent to $52 million in 2024) for improving US 61 between Davenport and DeWitt. The funding was conditional to the state matching $5 million in grant money (equivalent to $17 million in 2024) by September 30, 1980. The Davenport-to-DeWitt project was expected to cost $34 million (equivalent to $118 million in 2024) The Iowa 561 project was not seriously affected by the budgetary constraints of the early 1980s because it was receiving federal matching funds; however, the four-lane extension to Dubuque was put on hiatus. The Iowa 561 freeway was dedicated and opened to traffic on December 1, 1982. After the new highway opened, there remained two segments of the old road–a short section between I-80 and Mount Joy and a longer stretch from Mount Joy to De Witt. The latter road was renamed Iowa 956 and the former Iowa 960; both of which were unsigned highways. Passage of the Surface Transportation and Uniform Relocation Assistance Act in 1987 allowed the Iowa DOT to post a 65 miles per hour (105 km/h) speed limit on the new US 61 freeway as it was built to Interstate Highway standards rather than the 55-mile-per-hour (90 km/h) national speed limit. It also allocated $20 million (equivalent to $47 million in 2024 dollars) for making US 61 a four-lane highway from Davenport to Dubuque.

In the early 1980s, the City of Davenport and the Iowa DOT agreed to split a $1.3 million fund (equivalent to $3.79 million in 2024 dollars) collected from tolls on the I-74 Bridge. The fund was established in 1971 to pay for another bridge connecting Davenport and Rock Island, but it never made it out of planning stages. The plan was to create two multi-lane one-way routes through Davenport starting at the northern city limits by the end of 1983. Southbound traffic would use a newly constructed street for several miles until it merged with Harrison Street just north of 35th Street; northbound traffic would use Brady Street, which had been a two-way, four-lane street. In 1989, the City of Davenport held a contest among elementary school students to name the new southbound lanes of US 61. The name Welcome Way was chosen from 400 submissions because it was the street that welcomed motorists from I-80.

=== Muscatine bypass ===
In Muscatine, the fiscal crunch of the 1970s and early 1980s kept a project to re-route US 61 around the city on a semi-permanent delay. DOT officials promised the project would happen, but a lack of funding prevented the project from beginning. In addition to inflationary pressures, the DOT cited the financial woes were compounded by increased use of gasohol, which was exempt from fuel taxes, and the failures of the Milwaukee Road and Rock Island Line. One final delay in the project was its location. The creation of Fuller Park in the 1970s on the western side of the city forced DOT planners to move the proposed highway's path farther west. The planned roadway was to split a farm near Fuller Park in half, the owners of which sought to again move the roadway away from their farm. DOT and city officials counter-argued that further delays would beget more delays and the project may never happen. But it was ultimately decided to continue with the plan that divided the farm.

The project was divided into two segments. As the road was going to have distinct north–south and east–west sections, there was a natural split point for the two sections. Grading work began on the north–south section in 1982 and paving was scheduled to occur the next year. Mother Nature, however, had other plans and many days of work in 1982 were lost to rain. The weather delays pushed back the construction timeline enough that only a few weeks of grading work remained on the entire route at the end of 1983. Paving work occurred through mid-1984, but was temporarily halted by rains in October. The project finally opened to traffic on December 13, 1984, at a final cost of $13.3 million (equivalent to $33.9 million in 2024).

=== US 61 and US 151 in Illinois ===
U.S. Route 61 and U.S. Route 151
- Location: East Dubuque, Illinois
- Length: 3.32 mi (5.34 km)
- Existed: 1971–1982

In May 1969, the US 61 and US 151 were routed off of the Eagle Point Bridge in Dubuque. Bridge inspectors discovered that the main spans of the bridge were not as structurally strong as they should have been. The bridge's weight limit was reduced from 10 to 4 short tons (8.9 to 3.6 long tons; 9.1 to 3.6 t), which effectively banned all semi-trailer truck traffic. Furthermore, the 1970 Wisconsin state highway map did not show the bridge at all and the Iowa highway map only listed it as a toll bridge. The bridge company and local police asked Iowa and Wisconsin highway commissioners to reconsider their decisions to remove highway signage from the bridge. Public confidence in the strength of the bridge waned after the U.S. Highways were removed.

Instead of traveling through downtown Dubuque via Central Avenue, White Street, and Rhomberg Avenue to the Eagle Point Bridge, US 61 and US 151 turned east onto Dodge Street and followed US 20 across the Julien Dubuque Bridge into East Dubuque. Immediately upon landing on the Illinois side of the river, the two highways exited US 20 and followed Wisconsin Avenue and Illinois Route 35 north into Wisconsin. The two highways traveled 3.32 miles (5.34 km) in Illinois. Upon opening of the new bridge in 1982, they were pulled out of Illinois and back through Dubuque to the Dubuque–Wisconsin Bridge. The new bridge entered Wisconsin about one-half mile (800 m) north of the Illinois–Wisconsin state line. After the new bridge opened in August 1982, the Eagle Point Bridge was closed. It was later mostly demolished with explosives in December 1982. The former alignment of US 61 along E. 20th Street and Rhomberg Avenue remained in the state highway system long after the demolition of the Eagle Point Bridge. A DOT review of maintenance agreements in 1992 led officials to discover that the state still owned the former US 61, then known as the unsigned Iowa 924. Ownership of the former highway was transferred to the City of Dubuque effective March 9, 1993.

=== Fort Madison bypass delayed ===
Through Fort Madison, the highway followed narrow city streets and a few 90-degree turns. Near the old Iowa State Penitentiary, there was a steep hill that ended at a three-way stop with a connection to the Fort Madison Toll Bridge. In the late 1960s and again in the early 1970s, the highway commission proposed widening US 61 through the city. The commission presented number of alternatives, most of which routed the highway through the southwestern portion of the city closer to the Mississippi River. To city leaders, this was the best option for serving the needs of businesses and local traffic. To residents of the zone through which the highway would pass, mainly African- and Mexican-Americans who were shunted to that part of town by discriminatory means, the plans represented continued discrimination. Over thirty percent of the residents who would be displaced by the highway were minorities, while minorities represented less than ten percent of Fort Madison's total population.

Based on the success of highway revolts in San Francisco and elsewhere, residents of southwestern Fort Madison decided to fight back against the project. They enlisted the help of a National Association for the Advancement of Colored People (NAACP) lawyer, who quickly charged that the project was in violation of Title VI of the Civil Rights Act of 1964, which prohibits discrimination in programs that receive federal funding. Local NAACP leader Virginia Harper led the opposition against the highway relocation; she organized Fort Madison residents who would not be displaced by the highway and non-residents alike. In May 1974, the Federal Highway Administration (FHWA) found that the relocation project indeed violated the Civil Rights Act and not eligible for federal funding. The City of Fort Madison and the ISHC did not agree and continued planning. Harper appealed to the United States Department of Transportation's (USDOT) Office of Civil Rights and was one of the members of the opposition at arbitration hearings in Washington, D.C., in October 1974. Lawyers from the USDOT and ISHC agreed to settle the issue in March 1976 if the USDOT dropped the discrimination charge and the highway commission renounced its plans for relocating US 61. After the dispute was settled, President Gerald Ford sent a letter to the mayor of Fort Madison that expressed relief toward the settlement.

=== Dubuque connections ===
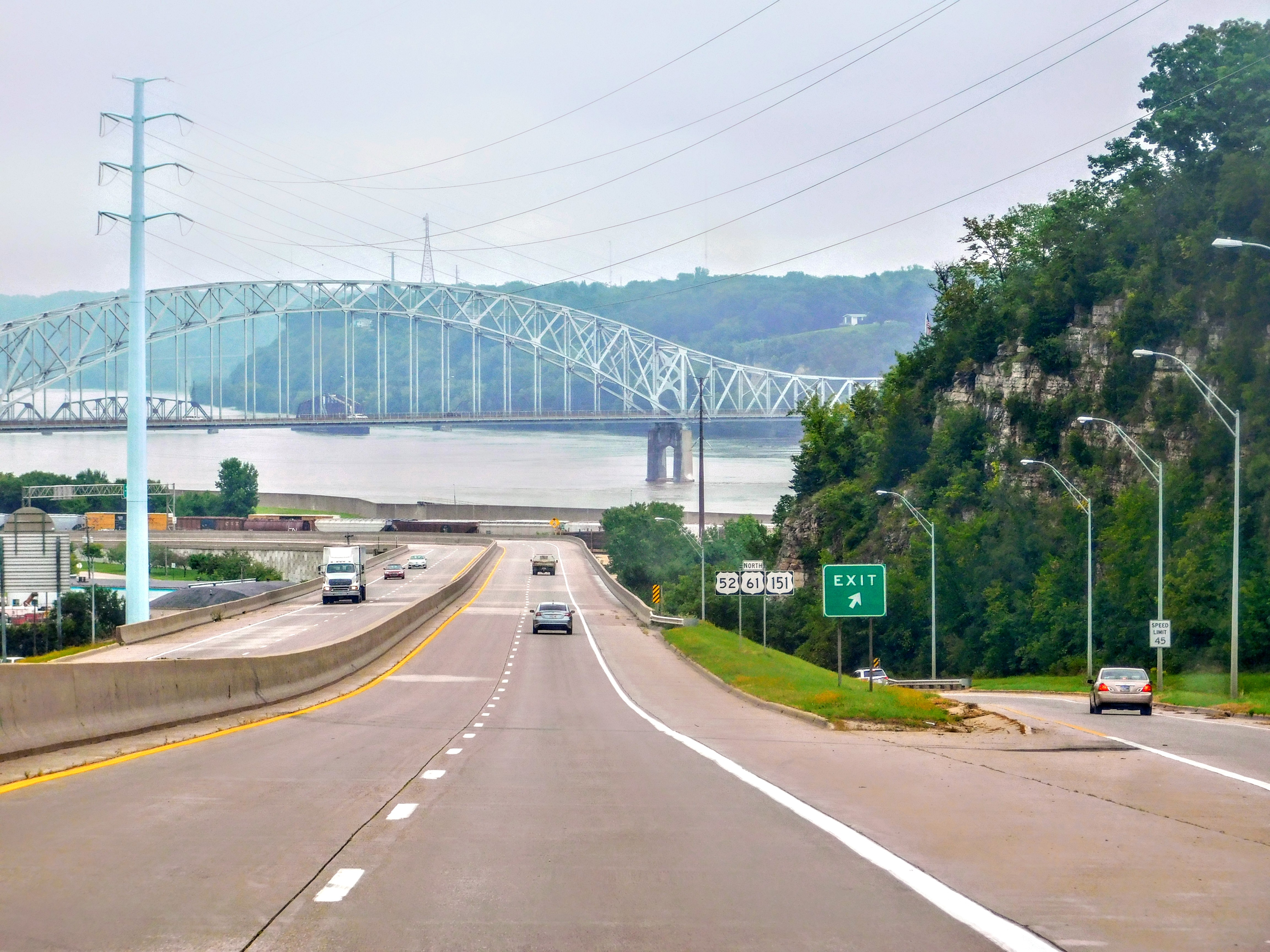
US 52 / US 61 / US 151 descend into the Mississippi River valley at Dubuque

The new US 61 / US 151 bridge and its connection into Wisconsin were built as a four-lane freeway. In anticipation for future road works, the Iowa side of the bridge ended abruptly, and traffic was routed on and off of the bridge on entrance and exit ramps connecting to E. 16th Street and Kerper Boulevard. There was congressional support for completing the connection to Kerrigan Road; $14 million (equivalent to $35.7 million in 2024) was earmarked by the U.S. Senate in 1984. There was confusion among Iowa and USDOT officials about which agency would pay for a bridge across the Peosta Channel, which flowed between mainland Dubuque and City Island. U.S. Senator Chuck Grassley and U.S. Representative Tom Tauke announced that U.S. Transportation Secretary Elizabeth Dole had approved a $13.5 million grant to pay most of the bridge's $17 million price tag (equivalent to $31.9 million and $40.1 million in 2024, respectively). During construction of the bridge, seven 40-short-ton girders (36-long-ton; 36 t) collapsed into Peosta Channel because of worker error. The girders were not properly secured into place and the collapse occurred due to normal expansion in the heat.

Planning for the connection to Kerrigan Road began shortly after the Dubuque–Wisconsin Bridge opened in 1982. The design of the road was particularly difficult because DOT officials wanted to minimize disruption to downtown and rail infrastructures and because of the proximity of the Ice Harbor along the Mississippi River. It was determined that a direct connection to US 20 was not feasible, but it would be possible to relocate the railroad tracks to make room for the new highway. This design allowed for downtown access without dumping a large volume of traffic into the central business district. By 1988, the Iowa DOT and two railroads, Soo Line Railroad and Chicago Central and Pacific Railroad had agreed in principle to the design of the combined railway; they only had to work out the details of the project. The mayor of Dubuque, James Brady, perceived the talks as moving too slowly, so he offered to shave his beard if talks were completed by July 4, 1988. The sides did not come together in time and Mayor Brady kept his beard.

An elevated highway was chosen for the segment between downtown and the Mississippi River bridge for a number of factors. DOT engineers factored in the effect of the highway on stormwater collection and determined raising the highway would have the least detrimental effect. Additionally, heavy metals and coal tar found in the industrial land beneath the highway could be cleaned up without disrupting traffic on the highway. Deck replacement on the Julien Dubuque Bridge that carries US 20 into Illinois for most of 1991 added another wrinkle to the construction project. The bridge was closed and its traffic was rerouted onto US 61 / US 151 between Locust Street and into Wisconsin, thence south on Wisconsin Highway 35 and Illinois Route 35 into East Dubuque, Illinois.

Building the connection to Kerrigan Road were part of a wave of downtown renewal projects. New museums and recently legalized riverboat gambling were some of the new attractions to Dubuque's downtown. The southern segment of the downtown project, from Grandview Avenue to the at-grade intersections, opened on January 28, 1991. All told, the expressway project in Dubuque totaled over $85 million (equivalent to $166 million in 2024). As sections were completed, the Locust Street connector became Iowa 946 officially and streets that had carried US 61 and US 151 during construction were given back to the City of Dubuque on March 1, 1993.

=== Four-lane construction ===
Road construction in the 1990s and early 2000s consisted of twinning the existing two-lane road. In 1992, the Iowa DOT announced $173 million was allocated for highway projects across the state, $50 million of which was planned for widening US 61 (equivalent to $346 million and $100 million, respectively, in 2024). Revenue from the federal government was less than expected, so by the end of 1995 some projects, including segments of US 61 were pushed back. The National Highway System Designation Act of 1995 repealed the 55-mile-per-hour national speed limit (90 km/h) and allowed four lane rural roads to be 65 mph (105 km/h) without being built to freeway standard. The act also reinstated federal highway funding that had been reduced since passing of the Intermodal Surface Transportation Efficiency Act of 1991. In 1998, the state highway commission scheduled $2 billion (equivalent to $3.58 billion in 2024) for road works projects over the next five years. Construction projects along US 61 focused on three main areas: Keokuk to Burlington, Muscatine to Davenport, and De Witt to Dubuque. While the US 61 project was not considered a priority project by the DOT, it did receive scheduled funding for completion by 2004.

One of the first segments of US 61 to be twinned in this round of construction was the section overlapped by US 218 near Keokuk. Governor Terry Branstad publicly stated his support for not delaying certain highway projects, a list of which included US 61 from Montrose to Fort Madison, while the DOT faced budget shortfalls. Near Wever pottery fragments and arrowheads, signs of a Native American settlement, were found by crews surveying for the expansion project. As segments of four-lane highway were opened to traffic, as the thirteen miles (21 km) between Fort Madison and Burlington did in August 1997, speed limits were raised from 55 to 65 mph (90 to 105 km/h). Aside from the bypass of Fort Madison, the four-lane road was complete between Keokuk and Burlington in 2001.

In Clinton County, the freeway section of US 61 ended three miles (4.8 km) north of the US 30 interchange near De Witt. The DOT began planning a 42-mile (68 km) continuation of the freeway that ended northwest of De Witt to Dubuque in the late 1980s. The fifteen miles (24 km) of roadway between De Witt and Maquoketa was expected to utilize existing right-of-way and have straighter curves than the two-lane road. North of Welton, construction was delayed for a few months when crews discovered that bridges over Deep Creek were ten feet (3.0 m) off course and had to be rebuilt. The two spans were 25 percent complete when the error was discovered. By the end of January 1997, four laning was completed between De Witt and Maquoketa.

Road construction north of Maquoketa was split into two projects – one in Jackson County and the other in Dubuque County. Both projects were scheduled to be complete by the end of 1996. Near Fulton, the Iowa DOT and a local family had a disagreement on the fair market value of 18.5 acres (7.5 ha) along US 61. The disagreement led to the condemnation of the property and the family's eviction. Construction past Hurstville, Zwingle, and the Dubuque Regional Airport continued for the next two years. Finally, Dubuque had a four-lane link to the Interstate Highway System.

Between Blue Grass and Muscatine, the highway was garnering a deadly reputation. From mid-1999 to mid-2000, seven people died along a five-mile-long (8.0 km) stretch of two-lane highway between the two cities. Through Blue Grass, accidents were reduced by adding a center turn lane. Construction was not quite complete when local and DOT officials dedicated the new lanes on October 19, 2000. Road work was also happening south of Muscatine. Eight miles (13 km) of new road was being built from the bypass southwest to the Louisa–Muscatine county line. Louisa County was largely cut out from any discussions of widening US 61 because of a relative lack of civic participation.

=== Davenport realignment ===
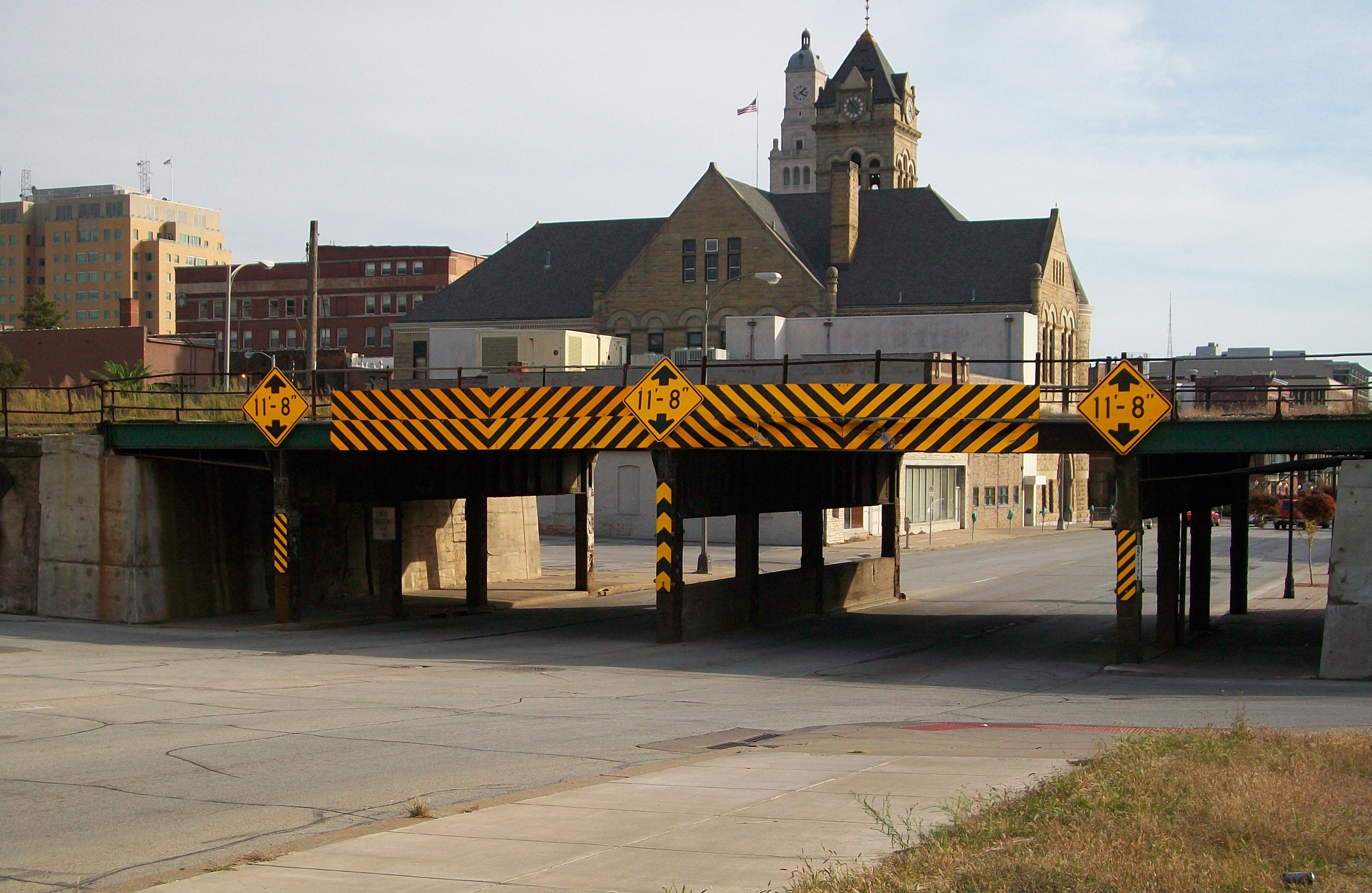
The "truck-eating bridge" in Davenport

In 2010, in large part due to a pair of railroad bridges each with an 11-foot-8-inch clearance (3.56 m) in downtown Davenport, US 61 through Davenport was moved to Interstates 80 and 280. Between 1984 and 1990, there were 83 incidents involving vehicles at the Harrison Street bridge; most of which involved large trucks that misjudged the heights of their trailers. A study was conducted in 1991 to judge the viability of raising or replacing the bridge. Ten years later, DOT officials sought $5 million (equivalent to $8.63 million in 2024) to permanently fix the rail line while some city officials thought the low bridge kept out a significant amount of truck traffic from downtown Davenport. Instead, an electronic vehicle height detection system was installed several blocks ahead of the bridge. The cost of the detection system was $103,000 (equivalent to $177,753 in 2024).

In 2010, Iowa DOT officials proposed rerouting US 61 out of downtown Davenport and along the Interstate Highways that surrounded the area: I-80 and I-280. The change was approved by AASHTO on May 28, 2010. Signage was changed in late 2011 and the old route through Davenport was redesignated as a business route. The IowaDOT inventories the route as Iowa 461. Despite removing US 61 away from the low bridges, trucks continue to misjudge their heights and strike the bridge.

=== Fort Madison construction at last ===
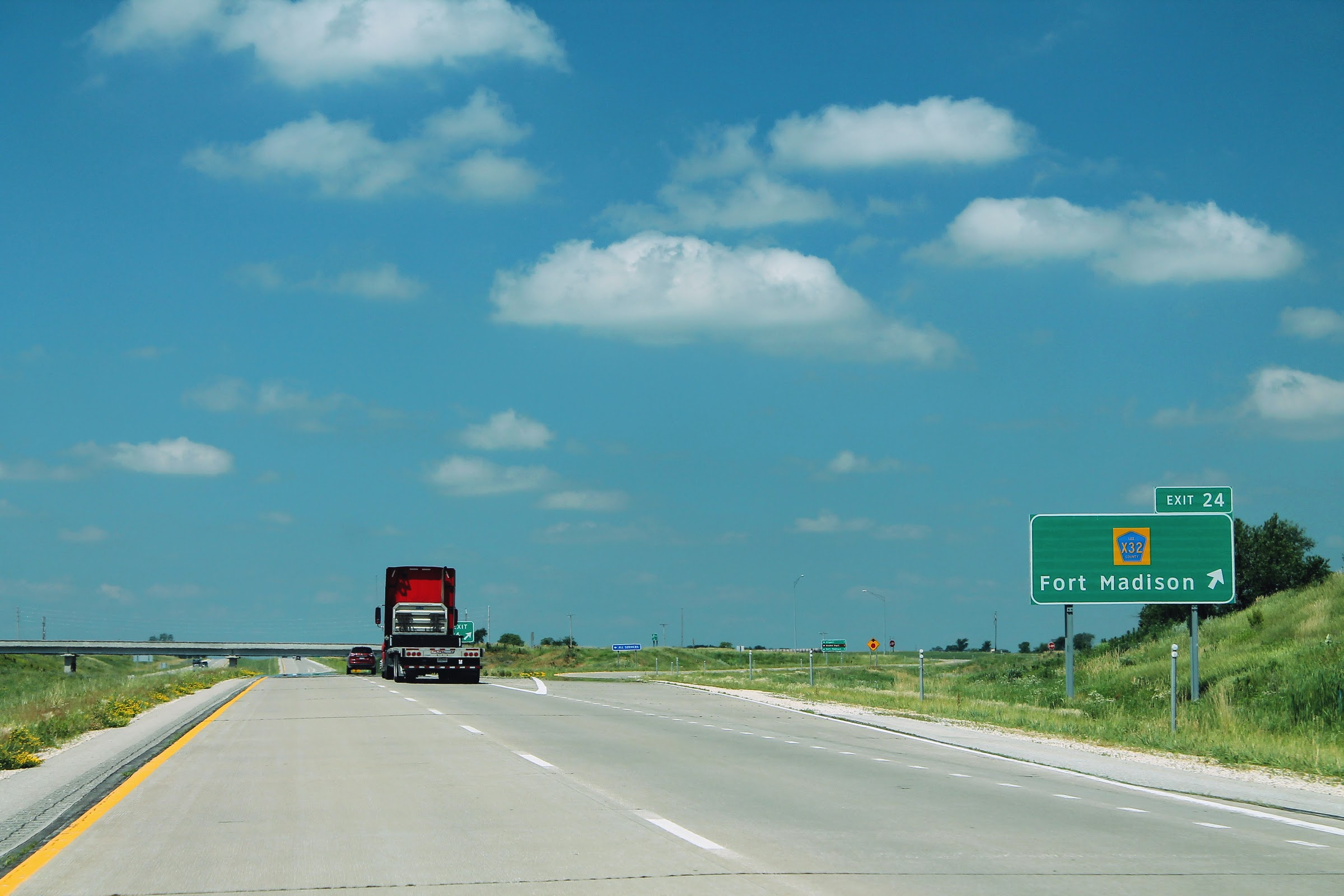
The Fort Madison bypass nearing its eastern end

The Iowa DOT began anew its preparations for a bypass of Fort Madison in the late 1990s. This time, the road was to be built as a four-lane highway around the city. Only two routes were under consideration; the commission chose what was called the "far north alternative", though no timetable for construction was given at the time. Work had been scheduled to commence in 2004, but the highway commission's five-year plan in 2002 pushed the work back to 2007. During the lapse between the 1998 and 2005 highway bills, the Iowa DOT did not schedule any major projects, though it did make small right-of-way purchases which gave hope to local leaders that the project would come soon. Finally, in 2005, highway commissioners scheduled the Fort Madison project to begin in 2009. The 2005 highway bill earmarked $4.72 million (equivalent to $7.26 million in 2024) for the bypass. The DOT originally expected the project to cost around $45 million, but adjusted that figure up to $92 million in their 2006 five-year plan (equivalent to $67.2 million and $137 million in 2024).

Plans originally called for an interchange at the former Iowa 103, but it was scrapped to save money. Officials in Fort Madison and West Point entered into an agreement with the Lee County Board of Supervisors to pay for the interchange. The project was bolstered by $358.2 million (equivalent to $508 million in 2024) designated to the state from the American Recovery and Reinvestment Act. It was expected in early 2010 that all grading and bridge work would be completed by year's end so paving could occur in 2011. The bypass opened on November 28, 2011, at a cost of $25 million (equivalent to $80 million in 2024). Like in Davenport, the old route became a business route. Its official designation was Iowa 961, but it only lasted for two years. When Iowa 961 was given to the city of Fort Madison, Iowa 2, which had followed US 61 to the three-way stop at the foot of the toll bridge, was also truncated back to the new interchange at the western end of town. As part of the bypass project, the Iowa DOT agreed to rehabilitate the former routing of US 61 so long as the city assumed maintenance of the roadway.

=== Recent developments ===
In the mid-2010s the process of four-laning US 61 between Muscatine and Burlington began again. The expressway stopped near the Muscatine–Louisa county line, which left a 32-mile (51 km) gap to Burlington. Officials noted that traffic accidents were four times higher on the two-lane stretch which saw about 900 trucks daily, on average. Plans were to extend the four lanes south about five miles (8.0 km) and build two interchanges: one that would serve a high school that abutted the highway and another to mark the southern end of the Iowa 92 overlapping. Officials broke ground in Louisa County on April 10, 2015. The extended expressway opened on November 30, 2017.

Plans to complete the missing section of four-lane highway are underway. The highway will be reconstructed along most of the current path and interchanges will be built at Mediapolis and Wapello. The design of the road around Wapello angered some city and county officials. They wanted two interchanges, one north of town and the other south, for both safety and economic reasons. The local Iowa DOT engineer only included the northern interchange in plans. Updated plans a few months later added median U‑turn crossovers in lieu of a second interchange. The current Iowa DOT five-year plan allocates approximately $100 million for completion of the four-lane project through 2025.

== Major intersections ==
County	Location	mi	km	Exit	Destinations	Notes
Des Moines River		0.000	0.000		US 61 south / US 136 west / Great River Road south – Canton, Wayland	Continuation into Missouri
Des Moines River		0.000	0.000		Missouri–Iowa state line	
Lee	Keokuk	0.546	0.879		US 136 east / US 61 Bus. north / Great River Road north – Keokuk	Northern end of US 136 and Great River Road overlap
Lee	Keokuk	3.817	6.143		US 218 south / US 61 Bus. south – Keokuk	Southern end of US 218 overlap
Lee	Montrose Township	9.461	15.226		US 218 north – Mount Pleasant	Northern end of US 218 overlap
Lee	Montrose Township	11.743	18.899		Great River Road south (Mississippi River Road)	Southern end of Great River Road overlap
Lee	Jefferson Township	18.168	29.239	18	US 61 Bus. north / Iowa 2 west / Great River Road north – Donnellson, Fort Madison	Northern end of Great River Road overlap
Lee	Washington Township	22.140	35.631	22	CR J40 – West Point, Fort Madison	Former Iowa 103
Lee	Washington Township	23.780	38.270	24	CR X32 – Fort Madison	Former Iowa 88
Lee	Washington Township	26.658	42.902	27	US 61 Bus. south / Great River Road south – Fort Madison	Southern end of Great River Road overlap
Lee	Green Bay Township	31.363	50.474		Iowa 16 west to US 218	
Des Moines	Union Township	34.709	55.859		CR X62 / Great River Road north (Summer Street)	Former US 61; north end of Great River Road overlap
Des Moines	Burlington	40.211	64.713		Agency Street	Former Iowa 406
Des Moines	Burlington	40.402	65.021		US 34 / Iowa 163 – Illinois, Mount Pleasant	
Des Moines	Burlington	40.973	65.940		Mount Pleasant Street	Former US 34
Des Moines	Burlington	41.475	66.748		Sunnyside Avenue	Former US 61
Des Moines	Mediapolis	54.013	86.925	—	CR H38 – Mediapolis	Future interchange
Louisa	Wapello Township	59.695	96.070	—	Iowa 78 west – Morning Sun	Future interchange
Louisa	Wapello	66.227	106.582		CR X99 (Franklin Street) – Oakville	Former Iowa 99
Louisa	Grandview	73.005	117.490	74	Iowa 92 west / CR G48 – Grandview, Columbus Junction	Southern end of Iowa 92 overlap; former Iowa 252
Louisa	Grandview Township	75.059	120.796	76	170th Street – Letts	
Muscatine	Muscatine	84.609	136.165		US 61 Bus. north	
Muscatine	Muscatine	86.345	138.959		Hershey Avenue	Two-quadrant interchange
Muscatine	Muscatine	87.731	141.189		Iowa 22 west – Nichols	Southern end of Iowa 22 overlap
Muscatine	Muscatine	91.747	147.652		US 61 Bus. south / Iowa 22 east / Iowa 38 / Iowa 92 east – Muscatine	Northern end of Iowa 22 and Iowa 92 overlaps
Scott	Blue Grass	106.523	171.432	107	Blue Grass	
Scott	Blue Grass	108.021	173.843	109	Blue Grass	
Scott	Davenport	112.318– 112.734	180.758– 181.428	6	I-280 east / US 61 Bus. north	Southern end of I-280 overlap
Scott	Davenport	114.466	184.215	4	CR F65 (Locust Street / 160th Street) – St. Ambrose University	
Scott	Davenport	118.164	190.167	1	US 6 east (Kimberly Road) / CR F58 west – Walcott	Southern end of US 6 overlap
Scott	Davenport	118.535– 119.319	190.764– 192.025	290	I-280 ends I-80 west / US 6 west – Des Moines	Northern end of I-280 and US 6 overlaps; southern end of I-80 overlap
Scott	Davenport	121.750	195.938	292	Iowa 130 west (Northwest Boulevard) – Maysville	
Scott	Davenport	124.325– 124.751	200.082– 200.767	295	I-80 east / US 61 Bus. south – Chicago	Northern end of I-80 overlap; signed as exits 295A (south) and 295B (north)
Scott	Sheridan Township	125.837	202.515	124	CR F55 – Davenport Airport	Former US 61
Scott	Eldridge	126.895	204.218	125	CR F51 (Blackhawk Trail)	
Scott	Eldridge	128.903	207.449	127	CR F45 (Le Claire Road)	
Scott	Winfield Township	131.685	211.926	129	CR F41 – Long Grove, Park View	
Clinton	DeWitt	139.553– 139.809	224.589– 225.001	137	US 30 east – DeWitt, Clinton	Southern end of US 30 overlap
Clinton	DeWitt	140.721	226.468	139	US 30 west – DeWitt, Cedar Rapids	Northern end of US 30 overlap; signed as exits 139A (west) and 139B (east)
Clinton	De Witt Township	143.966	231.691		CR Y68	Former US 61
Clinton	Bloomfield Township	154.450	248.563	153	Iowa 136 – Delmar, Lost Nation	
Jackson	Maquoketa	157.649	253.711	156	S. Main Street	Former US 61
Jackson	Maquoketa	159.978	257.460	158	Iowa 64 (W. Platt Street) – Anamosa	
Jackson	South Fork Township	160.692	258.609		CR Y31 – Maquoketa Caves	Former Iowa 428
Jackson	South Fork Township	161.959	260.648		CR Y53 – Hurstville	Former US 61
Jackson	Fulton	166.059	267.246		Fulton Road	Former US 61
Dubuque	Table Mound Township	184.535– 185.092	296.980– 297.877	—	US 151 south – Cascade, Cedar Rapids	Southern end of US 151 overlap
Dubuque	Table Mound Township	185.608	298.707	184	US 52 north (Southwest Arterial)	Southern end of US 52 overlap
Dubuque	Dubuque	187.210	301.285		Maquoketa Drive	Former US 61 / US 151
Dubuque	Dubuque	187.626	301.955		US 52 south / Great River Road south – Bellevue	Northern end of US 52 overlap; southern end of Great River Road overlap
Dubuque	Dubuque	188.959	304.100	187	Grandview Avenue	
Dubuque	Dubuque	189.255– 189.499	304.576– 304.969	188	To US 20 (Locust Street)	Northbound exit and southbound entrance only
Dubuque	Dubuque	190.268	306.207	—	To US 20 (Locust Street Connector)	
Dubuque	Dubuque	190.536	306.638	189A	White Street / Port of Dubuque	Northbound exit and southbound entrance only
Dubuque	Dubuque	190.919– 191.063	307.254– 307.486	189B	9th Street / 11th Street / Great River Road north	Former US 52 / Iowa 3; northern end of Great River Road overlap
Dubuque	Dubuque	191.700– 192.411	308.511– 309.655	190	Kerper Boulevard / Eagle Point District	Former US 61 / US 151
Mississippi River		192.663	310.061	Dubuque–Wisconsin Bridge; Iowa–Wisconsin state line		
Mississippi River		192.663	310.061		US 61 north / US 151 north – La Crosse, Madison	Continuation into Wisconsin
1.000 mi = 1.609 km; 1.000 km = 0.621 mi: Concurrency terminus; Incomplete access

== Notes ==
U.S. Route 61
Previous state: Missouri	Iowa	Next state: Wisconsin
