= Wever, Iowa =

- CDP
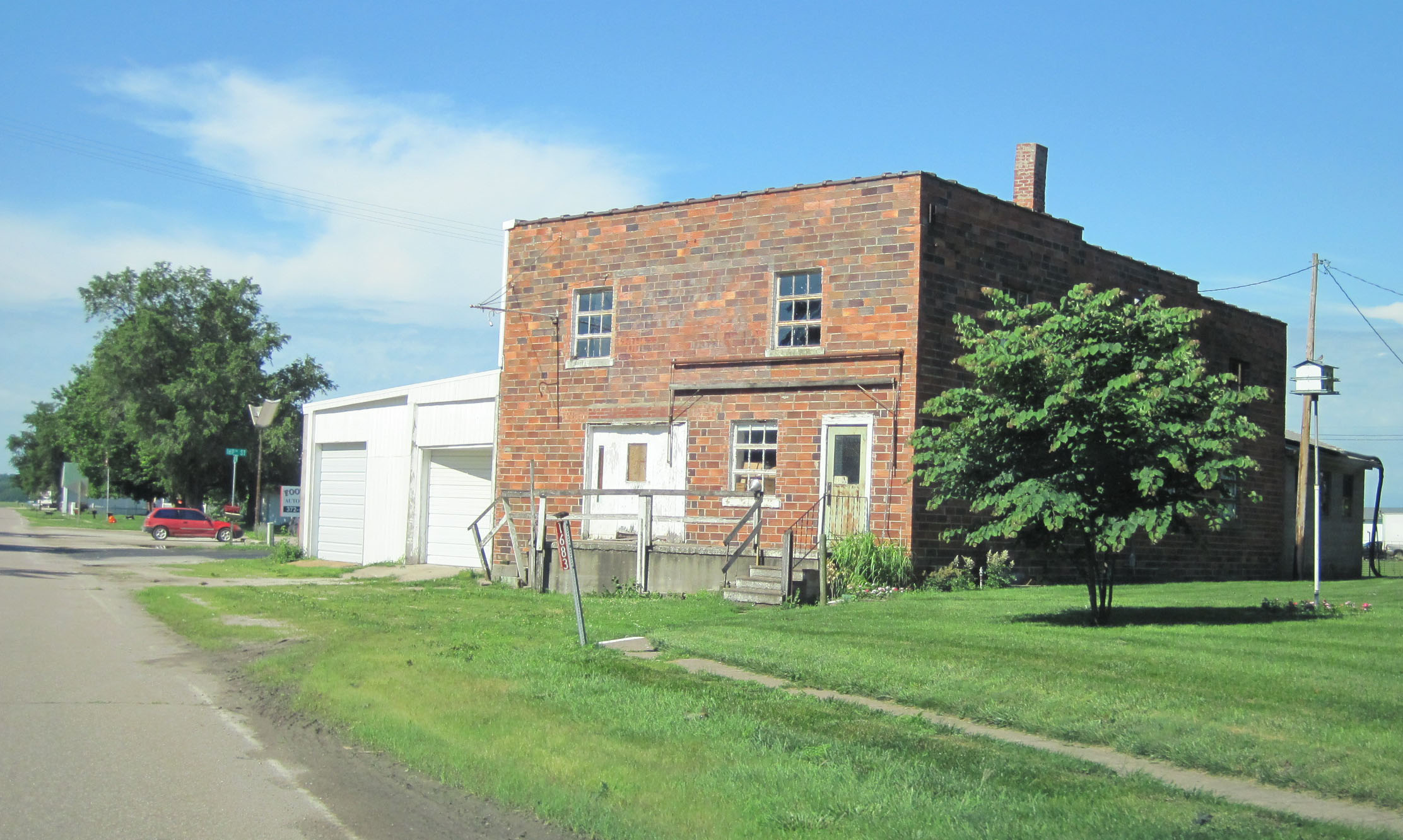
- Building in Wever

- Location in Iowa Location in the United States
- Coordinates: 40°42′20″N 91°13′41″W
- Country: United States
- State: Iowa
- County: Lee

Area
  - Total: 1.47 sq mi (3.82 km^{2})
  - Land: 1.47 sq mi (3.82 km^{2})
  - Water: 0 sq mi (0.00 km^{2})
- Elevation: 528 ft (161 m)

Population (2020)
  - Total: 101
  - Density: 68.4/sq mi (26.42/km^{2})
- Time zone: UTC-6 (Central (CST))
  - Summer (DST): UTC-5 (CDT)
- ZIP codes: 52658
- FIPS code: 19-84855
- GNIS feature ID: 2804145

Wever is an unincorporated community and census-designated place (CDP) in northeastern Lee County, in the southeastern corner of Iowa, United States. As of the 2020 census, its population was 101.

== Geography ==
Wever lies along U.S. Route 61, approximately eight miles northeast of the city of Fort Madison, one of two county seats in Lee County. It is just South of the Iowa Army Ammunition Plant and the Skunk River, which empties further east into the Mississippi River. Its elevation is 561 feet (171 m).

== Demographics ==
Historical population
| Census | Pop. | Note | %± |
|---|---|---|---|
| 2020 | 101 | | — |
U.S. Decennial Census

=== 2020 census ===
As of the census of 2020, there were 101 people, 47 households, and 23 families residing in the community. The population density was 68.4 inhabitants per square mile (26.4/km^{2}). There were 55 housing units at an average density of 37.3 per square mile (14.4/km^{2}). The racial makeup of the community was 92.1% White, 1.0% Black or African American, 0.0% Native American, 0.0% Asian, 0.0% Pacific Islander, 0.0% from other races and 6.9% from two or more races. Hispanic or Latino persons of any race comprised 5.0% of the population.

Of the 47 households, 21.3% of which had children under the age of 18 living with them, 38.3% were married couples living together, 4.3% were cohabitating couples, 10.6% had a female householder with no spouse or partner present and 46.8% had a male householder with no spouse or partner present. 51.1% of all households were non-families. 48.9% of all households were made up of individuals, 17.0% had someone living alone who was 65 years old or older.

The median age in the community was 50.3 years. 17.8% of the residents were under the age of 20; 0.0% were between the ages of 20 and 24; 19.8% were from 25 and 44; 37.6% were from 45 and 64; and 24.8% were 65 years of age or older. The gender makeup of the community was 53.5% male and 46.5% female.

== History ==
Wever was a station on the Chicago, Burlington and Quincy Railroad.

Although Wever is unincorporated, it has a post office, which opened on May 1, 1837. This post office has a complicated name history: it opened as 'Sand Ridge', changed to 'Green Bay' on September 17, 1849, to 'Jollyville' on January 28, 1859, and finally to Wever on October 17, 1870. Its ZIP code is 52658.

== History ==
Wever was built around a station of the Chicago, Burlington and Quincy Railroad within Green Bay Township, and superseded the nearby town of Jollyville. It had 300 inhabitants when mentioned in the 1879 History of Lee County and was enjoying "good trade" because of the surrounding very fertile country. Wever's population was 66 in 1902, and had increased to 212 by 1925.

The community is a part of the Fort Madison-Keokuk μSA.

=== 20th century ===
The population was 125 in 1940.

In 1971, Mr. James Cook submitted the following statement about the fertilizer plant which Atlantic Richfield Company (ARCO) was operating in Green Bay Bottoms to produce anhydrous ammonia and diammonium phosphate fertilizers, to a US Senate committee: "ARCO Chemical Co., Division of Atlantic Richfield Co., Fort Madison, Iowa, May 20, 1971. To the U.S. House of Representatives, Committee on Appropriations, Subcommittee of Public Works, the U.S. Senate, Committee on Appropriations, Subcommittee of Public Works:

ARCO Chemical Company, a division of Atlantic Richfield Company, operates and maintains a fertilizer manufacturing complex adjacent to the Mississippi River in an area known as Green Bay bottoms. The capital cost of the complex was in excess of $60,000,000 and is entirely protected from the Mississippi River by levees. The plant significantly contributes to the economy of Fort Madison, Burlington, and surrounding communities. This complex of ARCO Chemical Company does employ approximately 1,000 people who are engaged in the manufacture, distribution and marketing of fertilizers, almost all of which are manufactured at this one facility. Any flooding of the Mississippi River at this point would have a detrimental effect to the company, an economic impact on the aforementioned communities and the earnings of a significant number of employees. Therefore, ARCO Chemical Company supports the continuing study by the Corps of Engineers in regard to the raising of the levees along the Mississippi River. G. T. Stocking, Vice President"

In 1976, the EPA reported that the ARCO Chemical Co. fertilizer plant in Fort Madison, IA, had a wet-process phosphoric acid unit, which had come on stream in 1968, had an annual capacity of 225,000 short tons, expressed as P_{2}O_{5}

== 21st century ==
In 2012, plans were announced to build a $1.4 billion fertilizer plant in Wever. The plant will use natural gas and is built by Orascom. Groundbreaking occurred in November 2012. The WSJ wrote that US economic rebound and cheap energy from the shale-oil boom was luring investment from companies such as Egypt's Orascom.
