= Iowa Primary Road No. 20 =

Primary Road No. 20

Route information
- Maintained by Iowa State Highway Commission
- Existed: 1920–1926

Location
- Country: United States
- State: Iowa

Highway system
- Iowa Primary Highway System; Interstate; US; State; Secondary; Scenic
← US 20	→ Iowa 21

Primary Road No. 20 (No. 20) was the designation of a state highway in Iowa that ran from the Missouri state line at Keokuk to the Minnesota state line near Cresco. No. 20 was in existence for six years—from 1920 to 1926. Today, the route is related to the following highways:

- U.S. Highway 61 between Missouri and Dubuque
- U.S. Highway 52 (formerly U.S. Highway 55) between Dubuque and Decorah
- Iowa Highway 9 between Decorah and Cresco
- Iowa Highway 139 between Decorah and Minnesota
