= Alfred Hurst =

English-born American politician (1846–1915)

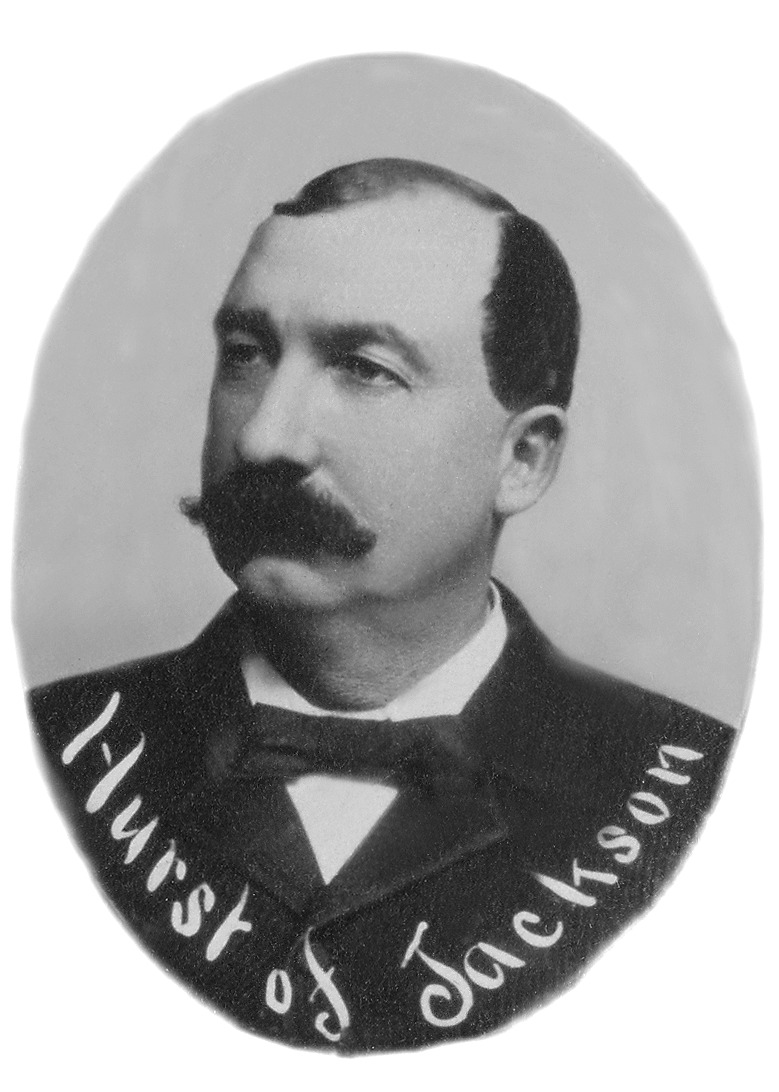

Member of the Iowa Senate from the 23rd district
- In office January 11, 1892 – January 7, 1900
- Preceded by: August George Kegler
- Succeeded by: Thomas Lambert

Personal details
- Born: November 19, 1846 Grimsby, Lincolnshire, England
- Died: March 25, 1915 (aged 68) Chicago, Illinois, U.S.
- Party: Democratic
- Spouse: Sarah Lary
- Children: 6
- Occupation: Businessman

Alfred Hurst (November 19, 1846 – March 25, 1915) was an English-born American politician and businessman. A Democrat, he served in the Iowa Senate from 1892 to 1900, representing the 23rd district. He was also the founder of a large and successful lime business.

== Early life ==
Hurst was born on November 19, 1846, in Grimsby, Lincolnshire, England. In 1852, he and his family immigrated to the United States, first landing at New Orleans, then settling in Davenport, Iowa. His father died in 1856, when he was nine years old.

As a teenager, he enlisted in the Union Army during the Civil War, and fought at the battles of Paducah, Shiloh and Fort Donelson. He was captured by Confederate forces at Fort Donelson and escaped during the Second Battle of Memphis.

== Career ==
Hurst moved to St. Louis following the war, where he engaged in steamboating. He discontinued this in 1866 and returned to Davenport with the intention of becoming a stonemason. He worked in Davenport until 1870, when he came to the Maquoketa area to inspect the limestone formations along the Maquoketa River. In 1871, he founded his lime company, A. Hurst & Company Lime Works, and built four kilns, which at their peak could produce 8,000 barrels of lime a day. He soon began selling to most states in the nation, becoming a major component of the lime industry in Iowa. He also founded the company-run town of Hurstville, now a ghost town north of Maquoketa, which consisted of two mansions, living quarters for workers, a school, a general store, a post office and various shops, among other things. The company employed around fifty people.

In 1886, he was elected to the board of supervisors of Jackson County, on which he served five years. In 1888, he organized the Maquoketa, Hurstville and Dubuque Railway Company and built a railroad connecting Maquoketa to Hurstville for the shipping of goods. In 1891, he was elected to the Iowa Senate from district 23, which constituted Jackson County. He assumed office on January 11, 1892, and was reelected in 1895, leaving office on January 7, 1900, after serving two terms. He was a member of the Appropriations, Commerce, Enrolled Bills, Labor, Mines and Mining, Public Health, Agriculture, Federal Relations, Charitable Institutions, Congressional and Judicial Districts, Highways, Military, Pharmacy, Printing, Public Buildings, Railways, Retrenchment, Senatorial and Representative Districts, and Ways and Means committees. He also founded Maquoketa's fire department.

A. Hurst & Co. began declining in the early 20th century as the popularity of portland cement increased, and effectively shut down by 1920. It was officially shut down in 1930 when William Hurst, Alfred's brother, died.

== Personal life ==
Hurst married Sarah Lary, a Virginia native, on December 12, 1873, and had six children. Hurst became ill on a trip to Chicago in 1915 and died on March 25 of that year at the age of 68.

Hurst was a Freemason, as well as a member of the Independent Order of Odd Fellows and the Knights of Pythias.
