= Lock and Dam No. 19 =

Dam in Illinois and Iowa, U.S.

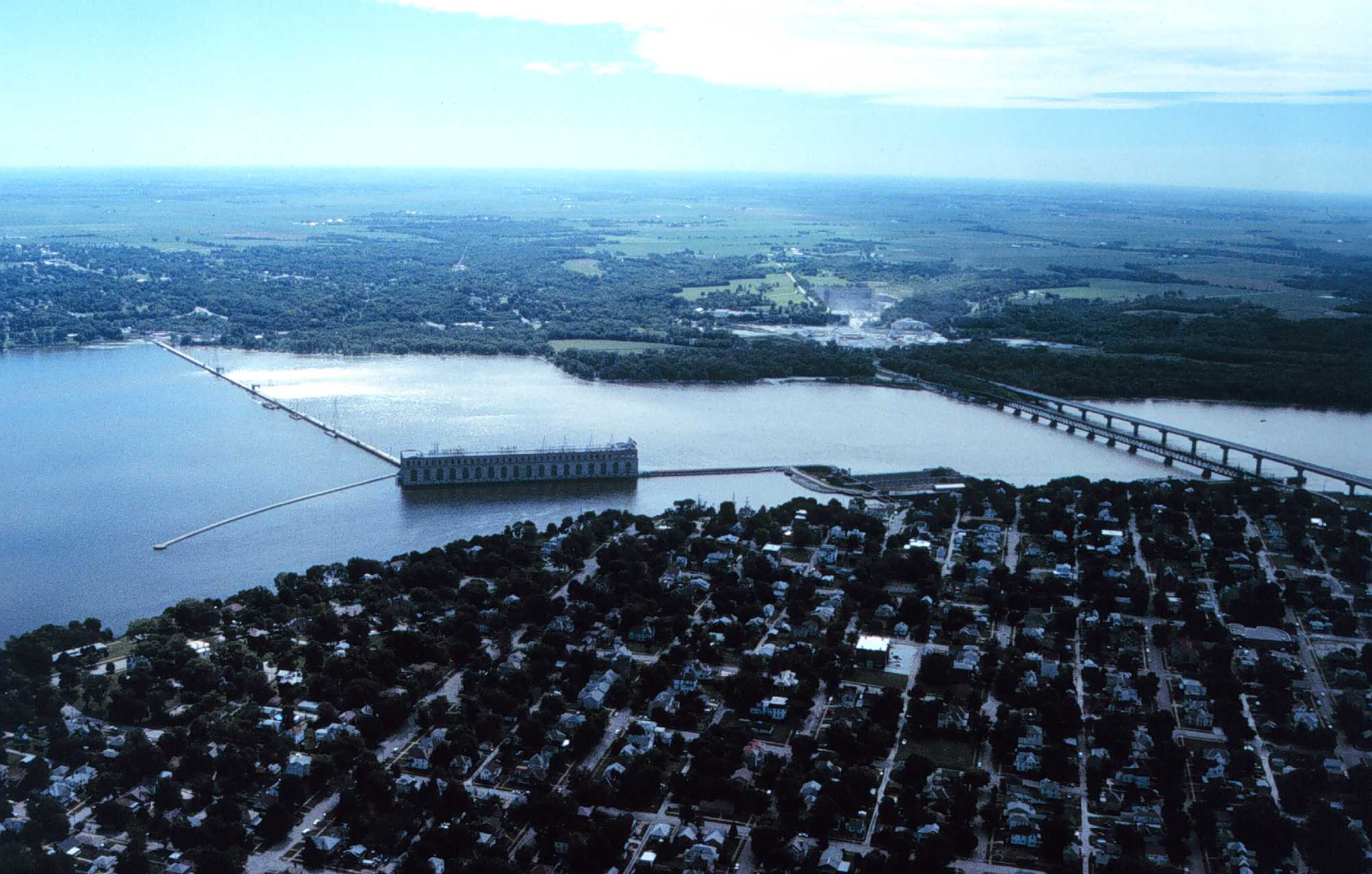
- Mississippi River Lock and Dam number 19
- Interactive map of Lock and Dam No. 19
- Location: Hamilton, Illinois / Keokuk, Iowa
- Coordinates: 40°23′45.46″N 91°22′26.71″W
- Construction began: 1910
- Opening date: 1913
- Operators: U.S. Army Corps of Engineers, Rock Island District

Dam and spillways
- Impounds: Upper Mississippi River
- Length: 4,620 feet (1,408 m) (movable portion)

Reservoir
- Creates: Pool 19 / Lake Cooper
- Total capacity: 292,000 acre⋅ft (0.360 km^{3})
- Catchment area: 119,000 mi^{2} (310,000 km^{2})
- Lock and Dam No. 19 Historic District
- U.S. National Register of Historic Places
- U.S. Historic district
- Location within Iowa
- Location: 525 N. Water St., Keokuk, Iowa
- Area: 160.5 acres (65.0 ha)
- Built: 1870
- Architect: Meigs, Montgomery; Cooper, Hugh L.
- MPS: Upper Mississippi River 9-Foot Navigation Project MPS
- NRHP reference No.: 04000179
- Added to NRHP: March 10, 2004

Lock and Dam No. 19 is a lock and dam located on the Upper Mississippi River near Keokuk, Iowa. In 1978, the Keokuk Lock and Dam was listed in the National Register of Historic Places, #78001234. In 2004, the facility was listed in the National Register of Historic Places as Lock and Dam No. 19 Historic District, #04000179 covering 1,605 acres (650 ha), 7 buildings, 12 structures, 1 object. The lock is owned and operated by the U.S. Army Corps of Engineers. The dam is owned and operated by Ameren Missouri.

The lock and dam obliterated the Des Moines Rapids which had effectively been the northern barrier for traffic on the Mississippi until the mid-nineteenth century. Efforts began in 1837 to address the Mississippi's 2 ft 6 in (76 cm) depth in the rapids to improve navigability upriver.

== Locks ==
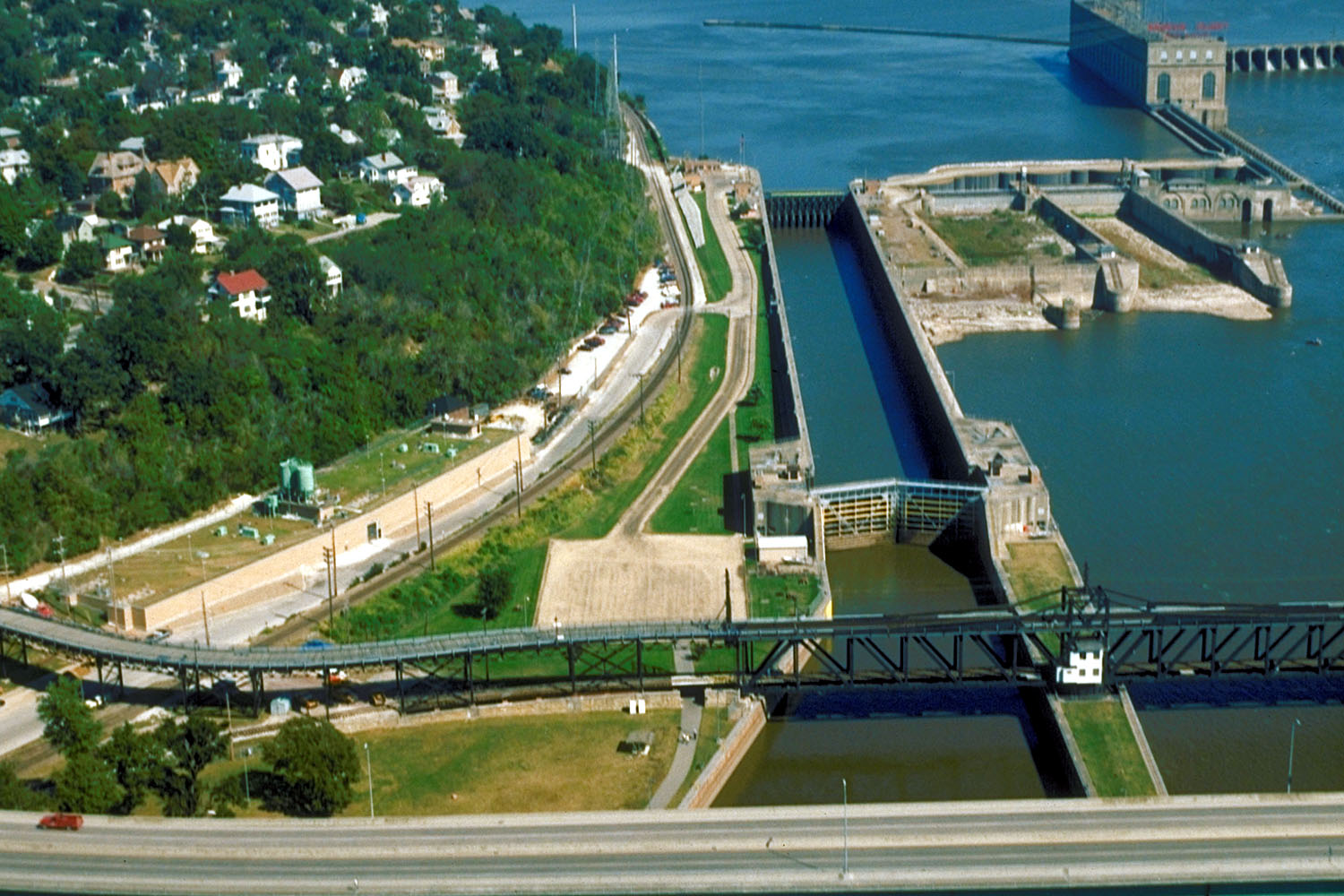
Aerial view of the locks at Lock and Dam 19. The 1957 lock is the largest at left, with the dewatered drydock and 1913 lock at its right. The old Keokuk Rail Bridge and Keokuk-Hamilton Bridge are visible in the foreground. View is upriver to the northeast.

The main lock was constructed from 1952 to 1957 and is 1,200 feet (366 m) long and 110 feet (34 m) wide with a lift of just over 38 feet (12 m) and large enough to handle a full-length tow of barges. It was put into operation in 1957 at a cost of 13.5 million dollars. The 1957 lock replaced a 1910-1913 lock. The 1913 lock was a variant of the standardized Panama Canal design and was 110 feet (34 m) wide, 358 feet (109 m) long and 57 feet (17 m) tall with a 40 feet (12 m) lift. There was a 130 feet (40 m) wide, 463 feet (141 m) long and 20 feet (6 m) deep dry dock at the site, both the dry dock and 1913 lock were dewatered in 1977 when a sheet pile and cell closure were built blocking the upstream sides of the lock and dry dock.

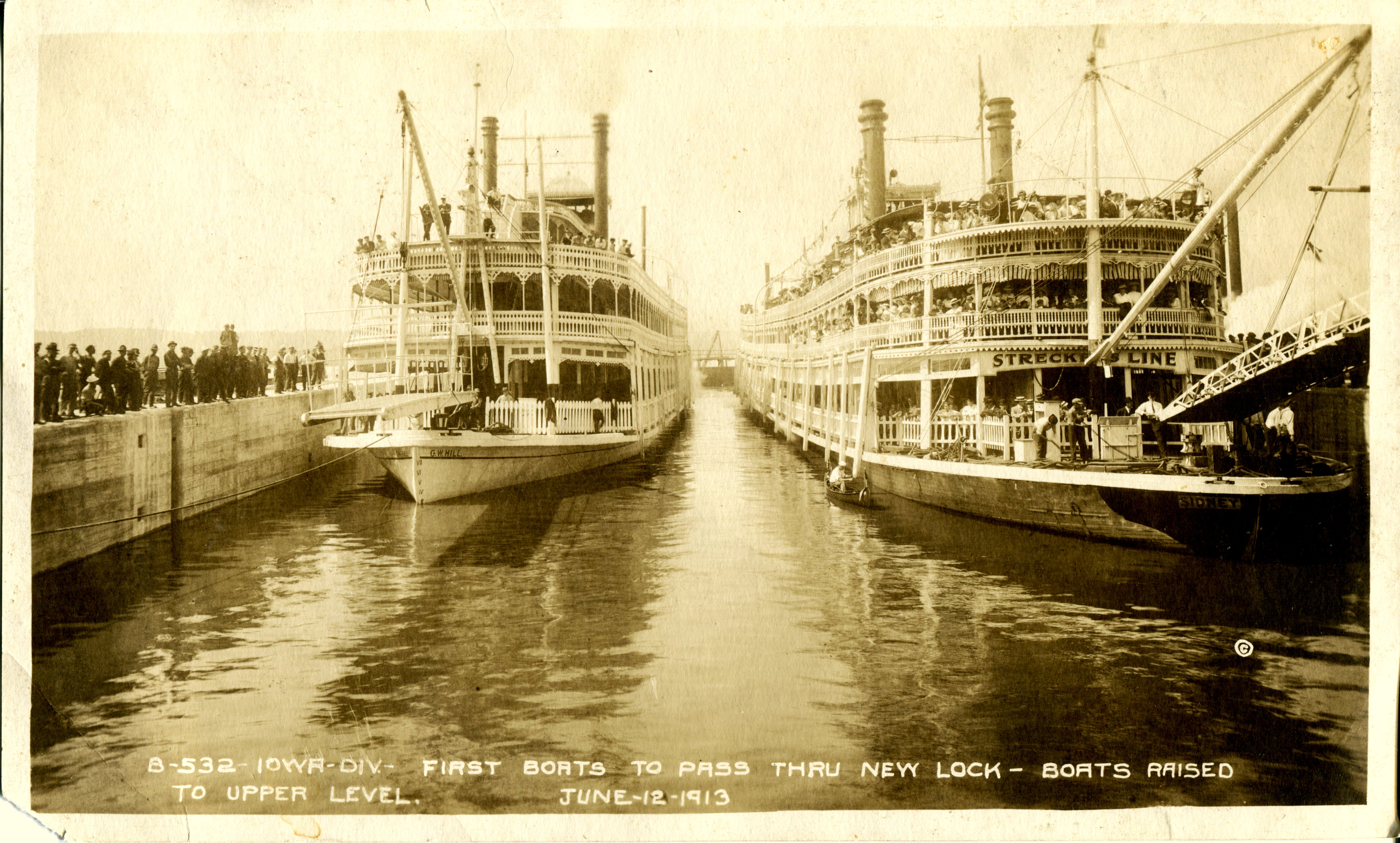
The Sidney of the Streckfus Line, with Captain Streckfus and 405 passengers on board, and the tow boat G. W. Hill

The lock and dam, as well as the rest of the river, can be viewed from a distance on the Observation Deck of the Keokuk Rail Bridge.

== Dam ==
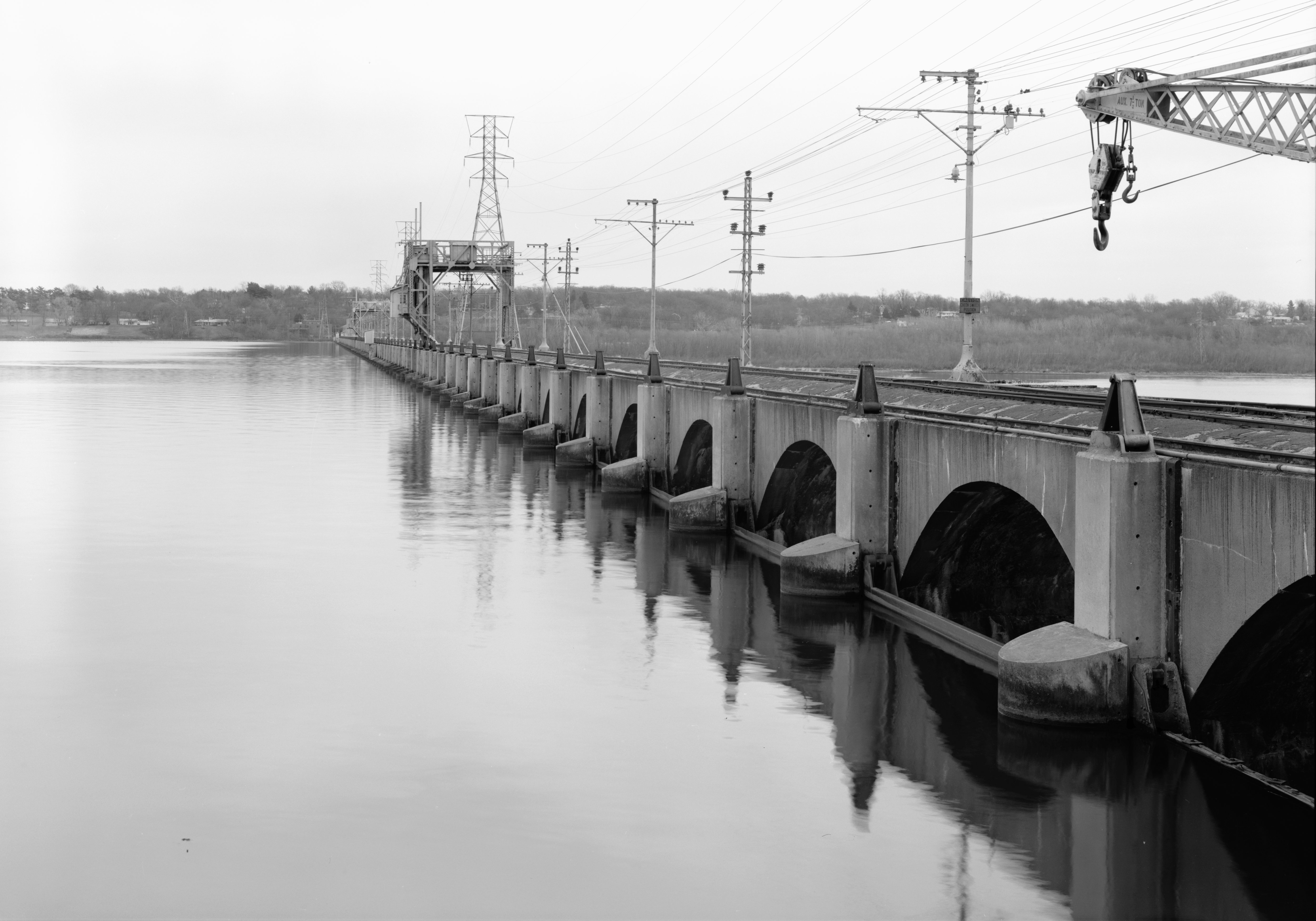
Upstream side of the dam, showing installed gates.

Construction of the dam began in 1910, and was completed in 1913. The movable portion of the dam is 4,620 feet (1,408 m) long with 119 separate 30 feet (9 m) rectangular, steel-skin plated, sliding gates. The gates are either installed or removed and river flow is controlled by the number of gates installed. They are removed by a gantry crane that travels on the service bridge above the dam. At the time it was completed, this dam was second in length only to the Egyptian Aswan Low Dam on the Nile River.

== Powerhouse ==
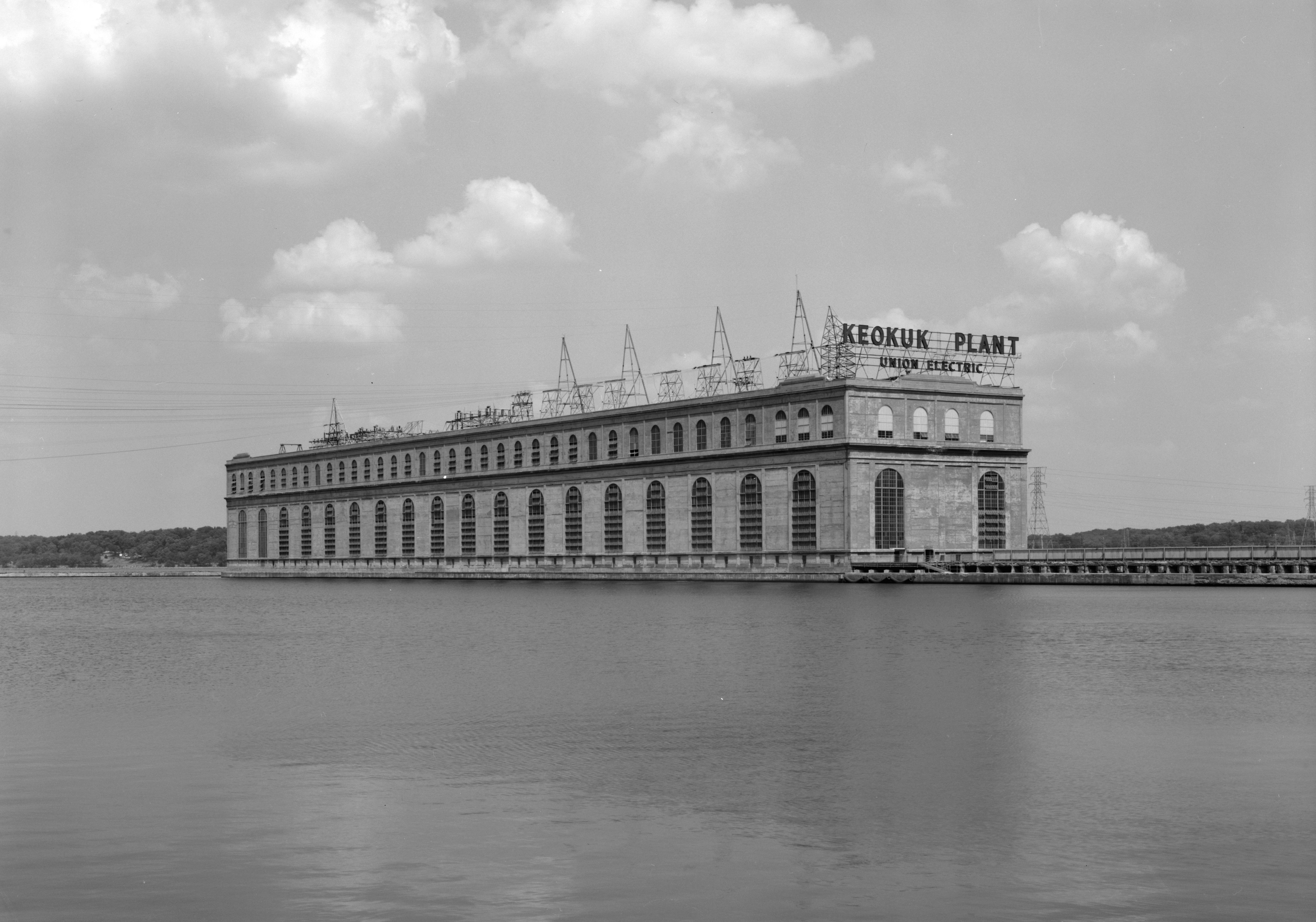
Keokuk Power Plant, formerly owned by Union Electric, now AmerenUE.

Construction began in 1910 and when completed in 1913 it was the largest-capacity single-powerhouse electricity-generating plant in the world. The Power House and spillways are owned and operated by Ameren Missouri and has a 142 MW capacity. The powerhouse contains 15 generators, originally designed to produce 25 Hz instead of the 60 Hz alternating current used today. Keokuk and Hamilton Water Power landed contracts in 1910 to deliver 44.7 MW of electricity to three customers located in St. Louis, MO (more than 100 miles downstream), at a time when no electric power had been transmitted more than a few miles: The Union Electric Light and Power Company, Laclede Gas Company and United Railways Company, which operated the St. Louis Street Railway Company. Union Electric Co. purchased the facilities in 1925. The 25 Hz generators powered industrial customers and used for the Streetcars in St. Louis, Missouri.

After World War II, a number of modernization improvements were undertaken. The 25-hertz generators were progressively converted to 60-hertz generators beginning in 1940s with the final units converted in 2002. Electronic automation replacement for some mechanical systems began in 1980s. Ameren Missouri, the current powerhouse owner, began replacement and conversion of the original 1913 turbines with more efficient stainless-steel turbines. Today, Keokuk Energy Center remains the largest privately-owned-and-operated dam on the Mississippi River. In addition to Lock and Dam No. 19, Lock and Dam No. 1, Lock and Dam No. 2 and the upper St. Anthony Falls dam also produce electricity on the Mississippi River system.

== See also ==
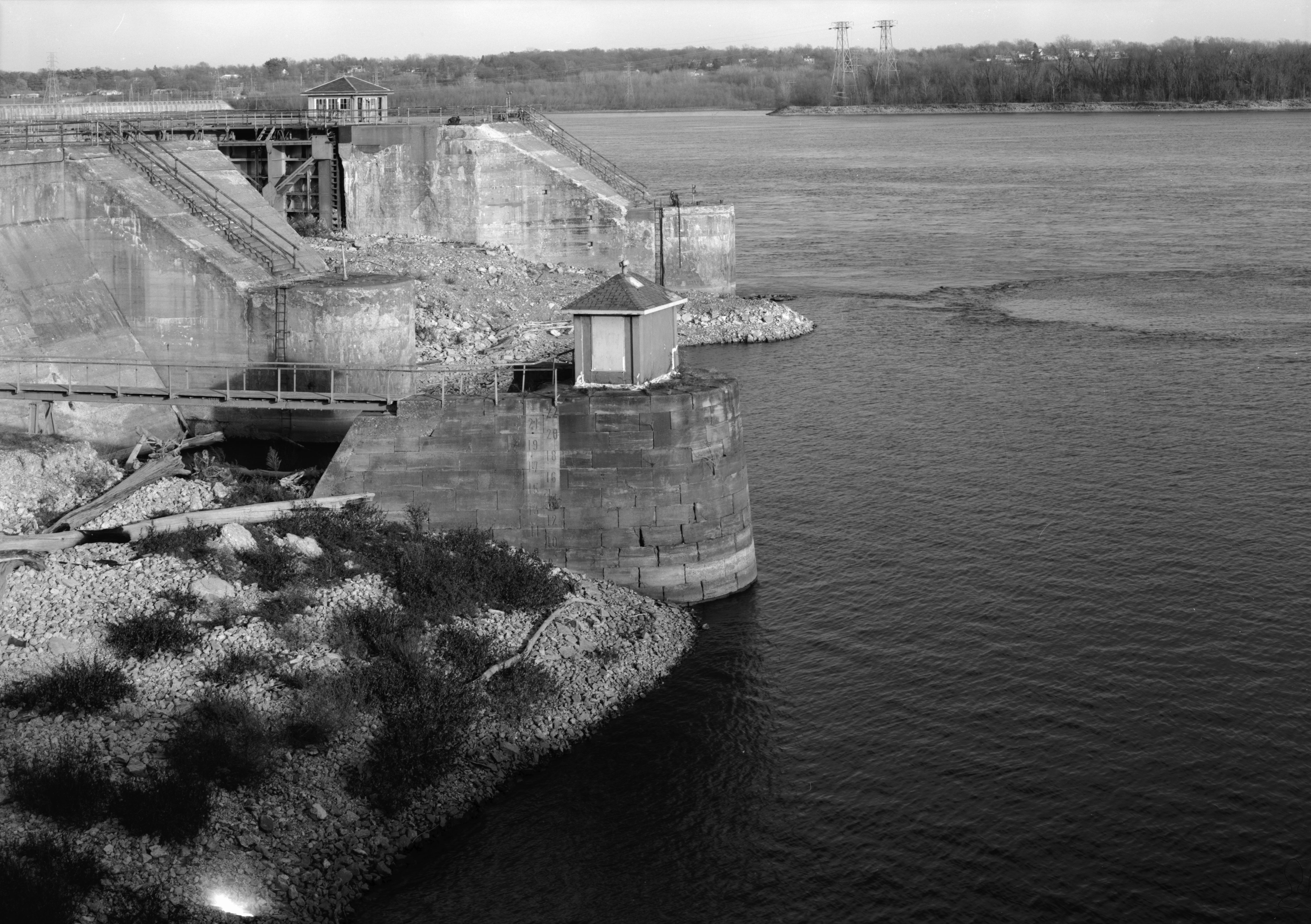
View of the bullnose of the Des Moines rapids canal, the last remaining part of the c.1870s canal, demolished c.1910. It is located just downstream of the abandoned dry dock and is the oldest part of the facility.

- Keokuk Rail Bridge
- Keokuk-Hamilton Bridge
