= Hurstville Historic District =

Historic district in Iowa, United States

- U.S. National Register of Historic Places
- U.S. Historic district
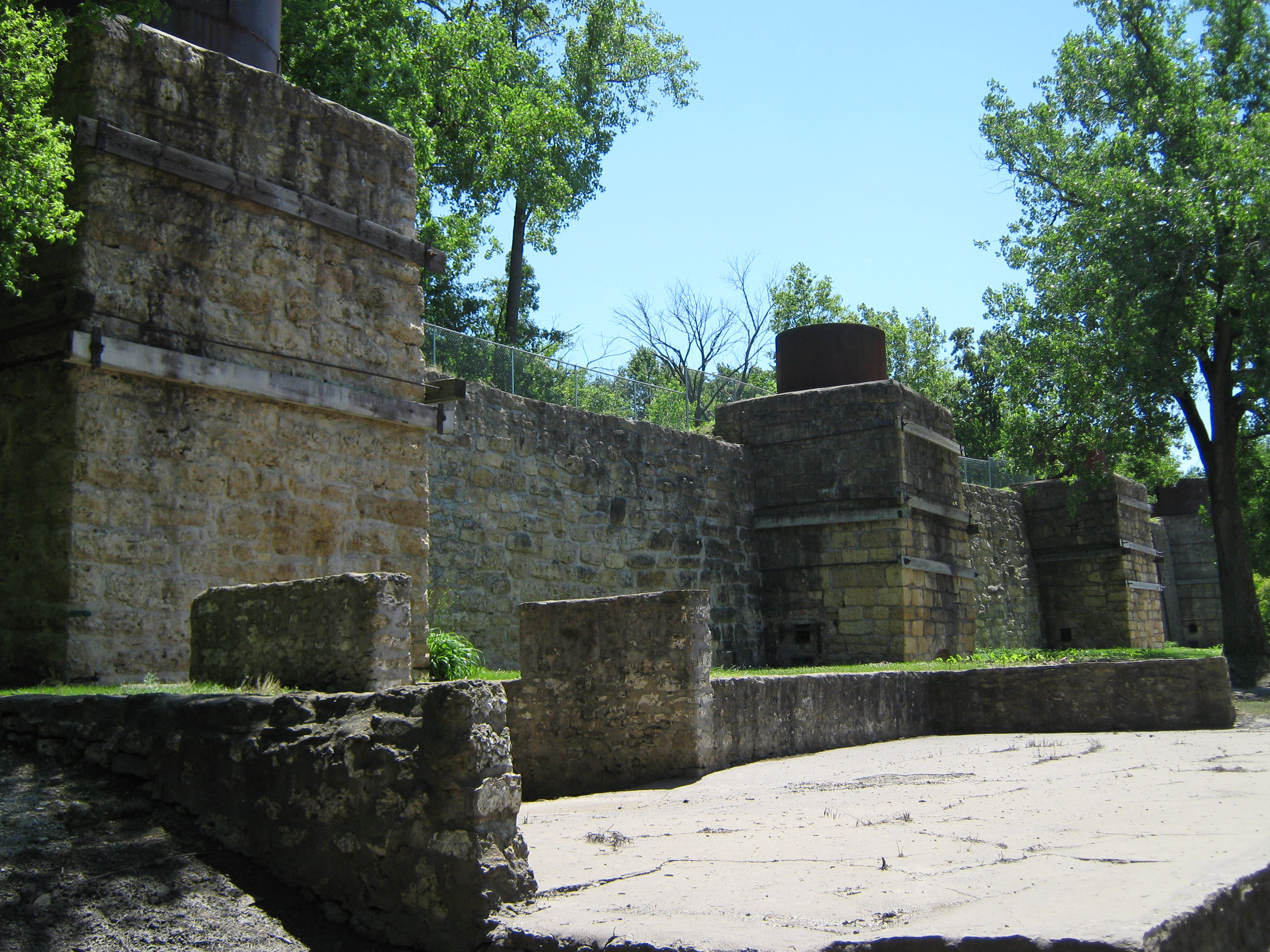
- Lime kilns

- Location within Iowa Location within the United States
- Location: North of Maquoketa on U.S. Route 61
- Coordinates: 42°05′38″N 90°40′55″W
- Area: 39 acres (16 ha)
- NRHP reference No.: 79000900
- Added to NRHP: December 3, 1979

Hurstville Historic District is a nationally recognized historic district located in the former city and current ghost town of Hurstville, which is located north of Maquoketa, Iowa, United States. It was listed on the National Register of Historic Places in 1979. At the time of its nomination it included three areas: the former lime manufacturing works, a farmstead, and the townsite. All that remains are the four kilns, and an old warehouse. Both the townsite, which was across the road and to the southwest, and the farmstead, which was behind the kilns to the south, are gone. Also gone are the remaining company buildings, with the exception of the old warehouse, which were across the road to the west. The houses in the townsite were side-gable cottages. Many lacked indoor plumbing into the 1970s and were vacant. The farmstead included 20 structures devoted to domestic or agricultural use. Two large barns were the most notable structures. The farm served the needs of the town. The most significant structures in the district were the lime kilns.

== History ==
Hurstville was an industrial complex and a company town. It was a major lime supplier in the state of Iowa for masonry building and bridge construction in the Midwest. Alfred Hurst built the first kiln in 1871, and the other three followed soon after. The whole operation grew to include 3,000 acres (1,200 ha) and 50 employees. The property included timber, which was used in the kilns. Hurst organized the Maquoketa and Hurstville Railroad in 1888 to ship the burned lime instead of hauling it by wagon. The limestone was quarried to the east of the kilns across the North Fork of the Maquoketa River. It was brought to the kilns by way of a narrow-gauge railway. A bridge, which collapsed into the river in the 1970s, was built over the river around 1900. By the 1920s the increased use of Portland cement by the construction industry affected the lime industry. The last time all four kilns were used at the same time was 1920, and the kilns were shut down in 1930 when William Hurst, Alfred's brother, died.

The Hurstville Land and Development Company bought the town and 500 acres (200 ha) of land in 1979. The kilns were restored by the Jackson County Historical Society in the 1980s and just five years later in late December 1985, the former city unincorporated and had its government go back to the county. The Jackson County Conservation Board operates an interpretive center near the kilns. It is part of the Silos & Smokestacks National Heritage Area.

== See also ==
- List of Discontinued cities in Iowa
