= Keokuk–Hamilton Bridge =

Keokuk-Hamilton Bridge
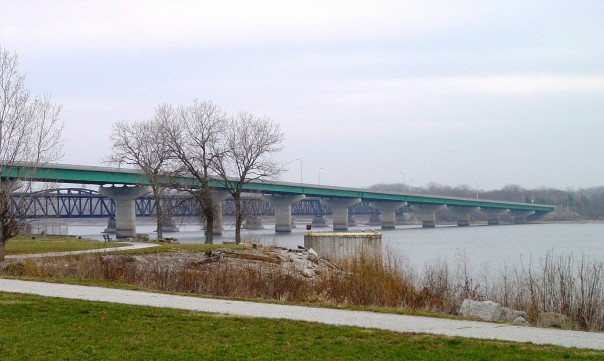
- Coordinates: 40°23′25″N 91°22′24″W
- Carries: 4 lanes of US 136
- Crosses: Mississippi River
- Locale: Keokuk, Iowa and Hamilton, Illinois
- Maintained by: Illinois Department of Transportation

Characteristics
- Design: Steel girder bridge

History
- Opened: November 1985

The Keokuk-Hamilton bridge is a steel girder, 4-lane bridge from Keokuk, Iowa to Hamilton, Illinois. It carries U.S. Route 136 across the Mississippi River. It also has fully fenced off pedestrian walkway.

The Keokuk–Hamilton Bridge was built in 1985, taking over automobile traffic from the Keokuk Rail Bridge (though the latter bridge still carries rail traffic).

During the Great Flood of 1993, the rising Mississippi temporarily made the Keokuk–Hamilton Bridge inaccessible from the Illinois side of the river; later, gravel was layered over the threatened section of U.S. 136 to raise its level and keep the road and bridge accessible for the remaining flood period. More recently, during the 2008 Midwest floods, the Illinois access was again threatened, but this time gravel was applied and the road level raised before it was rendered completely impassable; only temporary closings were required to allow road workers to complete the job. The Illinois Department of Transportation (IDOT) and WL Miller Co., a large concrete, quarry and asphalt company, put over 26,000 tons of rock on the eastbound lanes. The bridge approach was lifted about 4–6 feet in some areas. During the cleanup, some of the fairly new road was damaged, and IDOT is considering repaving the eastbound lanes from the bridge to Pats Pit Stop. During the Mississippi River Floods of 2019, the bridge was once again closed.

== See also ==
- List of crossings of the Upper Mississippi River
- Lock and Dam No. 19
