= Zwingle, Iowa =

- City
- Location of Zwingle, Iowa
- Coordinates: 42°17′50″N 90°41′15″W
- Country: United States
- State: Iowa
- Counties: Dubuque, Jackson
- Incorporated: December 17, 1900
- Named for: Ulrich Zwingli

Area
  - Total: 0.16 sq mi (0.42 km^{2})
  - Land: 0.16 sq mi (0.42 km^{2})
  - Water: 0 sq mi (0.00 km^{2})
- Elevation: 883 ft (269 m)

Population (2020)
  - Total: 84
  - Density: 517/sq mi (199.6/km^{2})
- Time zone: UTC-6 (Central (CST))
  - Summer (DST): UTC-5 (CDT)
- ZIP code: 52079
- Area code: 563
- FIPS code: 19-87690
- GNIS feature ID: 2397405

Zwingle is a city in Dubuque and Jackson counties in the U.S. state of Iowa. The population was 84 at the time of the 2020 census, down from 100 in 2000.

== History ==
Zwingle was originally built up chiefly by settlers from Pennsylvania. It was named for Swiss reformer Ulrich Zwingli. It was near Zwingle that South Dakota Governor George S. Mickelson and seven others died in a plane crash in 1993.

== Geography ==
According to the United States Census Bureau, the city has a total area of 0.16 square miles (0.41 km^{2}), all land.

== Demographics ==
Historical populations
Year	Pop.	±%
1910	69	—
1920	124	+79.7%
1930	145	+16.9%
1940	118	−18.6%
1950	132	+11.9%
1960	110	−16.7%
1970	96	−12.7%
1980	119	+24.0%
1990	94	−21.0%
2000	100	+6.4%
2010	91	−9.0%
2020	84	−7.7%
Source:"U.S. Census website". United States Census Bureau. and Iowa Data Center; Source: U.S. Decennial Census

=== 2020 Census ===
As of the 2020 Census, there was a total population of 84 people. There was a population density of 430.8 people per square mile, spread over 0.2 miles. Of those 84 people, the median age was 26.9 years, with 17.1% of the town's population under the age of 18, all of which are also under the age of 5, 70% between the ages of 18 and 64, and 12.9% of the population over the age of 65. There were a total of 33 households, with an average of 2.5 people per household.

60% of the town's population is male, with 40% of the population female. The racial makeup of the town was 100% White. 2.9% of the population are of English descent, 1.4% French, 45.7% German, 25.7% Irish, and 1.4% Norwegian.

The average income per capita of Zwingle was $19,572, which is far lower than the state average, and the median household income was $65,600, which is higher than the state average. Only 7.1% of the population of the town lives under the poverty line, which 4 percentage points lower than the state average.

31% of the population of the town is identified as currently married, but only 6.7% of women between the ages of 15 and 50 gave birth during that year, higher than the average in the Dubuque Metro Area.

83% of the Zwingle population has received a high school degree, which is 9.5 percentage points less than the rest of the state. The town also has a lower-than-average percentage of the population having received college degrees, only 6.4% of the town's population has received a college degree compared to the state average of 30.5%.

5.2% of the town's population were veterans.

=== 2010 Census ===
As of the census of 2010, there were 91 people, 45 households, and 23 families living in the city. The population density was 568.8 inhabitants per square mile (219.6/km^{2}). There were 49 housing units at an average density of 306.3 per square mile (118.3/km^{2}). The racial makeup of the city was 100.0% White.

There were 45 households, of which 17.8% had children under the age of 18 living with them, 33.3% were married couples living together, 8.9% had a female householder with no husband present, 8.9% had a male householder with no wife present, and 48.9% were non-families. 40.0% of all households were made up of individuals, and 8.9% had someone living alone who was 65 years of age or older. The average household size was 2.02 and the average family size was 2.61.

The median age in the city was 38.5 years. 16.5% of residents were under the age of 18; 9.9% were between the ages of 18 and 24; 27.5% were from 25 to 44; 26.4% were from 45 to 64; and 19.8% were 65 years of age or older. The gender makeup of the city was 50.5% male and 49.5% female.

=== 2000 Census ===
As of the census of 2000, there were 100 people, 42 households, and 23 families living in the city. The population density was 640.9 inhabitants per square mile (247.5/km^{2}). There were 43 housing units at an average density of 275.6 per square mile (106.4/km^{2}). The racial makeup of the city was 98.00% White, 1.00% Asian and 1.00% Pacific Islander. Hispanic or Latino of any race were 1.00% of the population.

There were 42 households, out of which 31.0% had children under the age of 18 living with them, 45.2% were married couples living together, 9.5% had a female householder with no husband present, and 42.9% were non-families. 38.1% of all households were made up of individuals, and 19.0% had someone living alone who was 65 years of age or older. The average household size was 2.38 and the average family size was 3.25.

31.0% are under the age of 18, 5.0% from 18 to 24, 28.0% from 25 to 44, 23.0% from 45 to 64, and 13.0% who were 65 years of age or older. The median age was 38 years. For every 100 females, there were 117.4 males. For every 100 females age 18 and over, there were 86.5 males.

The median income for a household in the city was $26,667, and the median income for a family was $45,625. Males had a median income of $25,417 versus $19,375 for females. The per capita income for the city was $18,916. There were no families and 1.4% of the population living below the poverty line, including no under eighteens and none of those over 64.

== Education ==
The Maquoketa Community School District operates the public school system.
