= Keokuk Rail Bridge =

Bridge across the Mississippi river

Keokuk Bridge
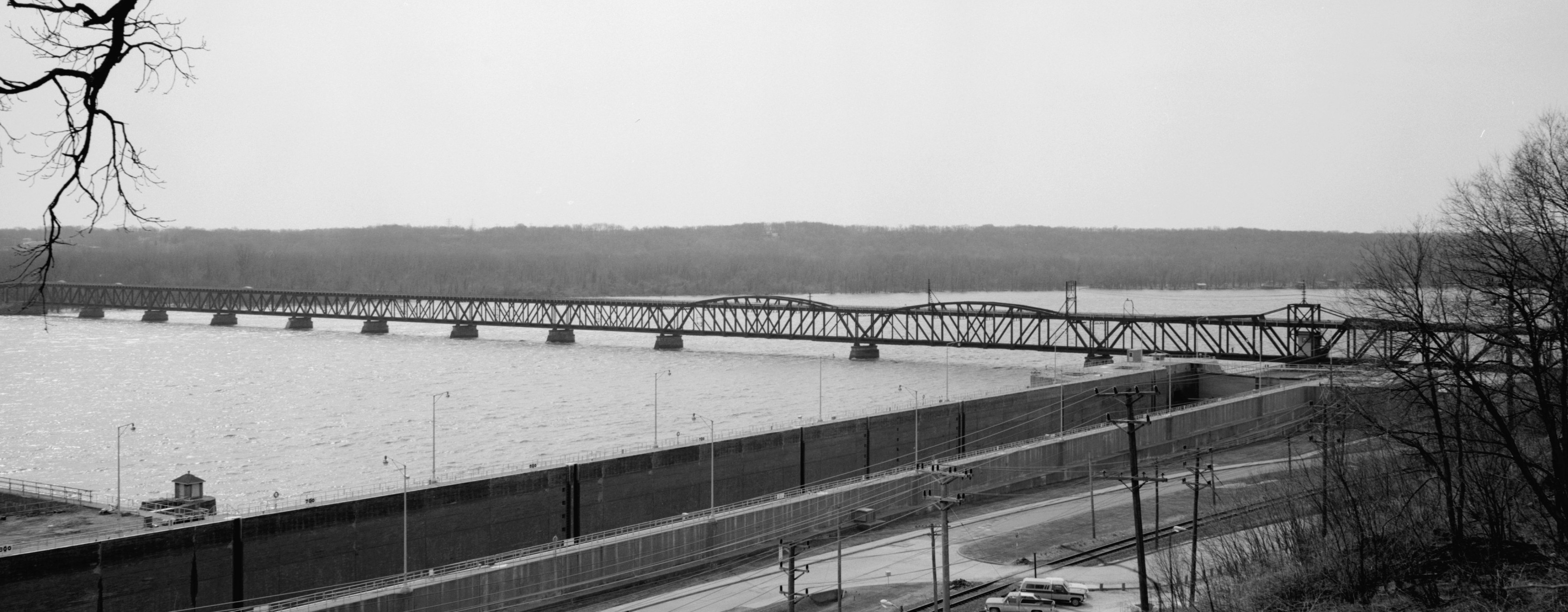
- Upstream of the Keokuk Rail Bridge, 1982
- Coordinates: 40°23′28″N 91°22′24″W
- Carries: Double-deck single-track railway and highway bridge
- Crosses: Mississippi River
- Locale: Keokuk, Iowa, and Hamilton, Illinois

Characteristics
- Design: Swing bridge

History
- Opened: 1916

The Keokuk Bridge, also known as the Keokuk Municipal Bridge, is a double-deck, single-track railway and highway bridge across the Mississippi River in the United States between Keokuk, Iowa, and Hamilton, Illinois, just downstream of Mississippi Lock and Dam number 19. It was designed by Ralph Modjeski and constructed 1915–1916 on the piers of its predecessor that was constructed in 1869–1871.

Following the completion of the Keokuk-Hamilton Bridge in 1985, the US Route 136 traffic was rerouted there, and the upper deck of this bridge, on the Keokuk side, was converted to an observation deck to view the nearby lock and dam; this deck is no longer used for road traffic, but the lower deck is still used for rail traffic. The bridge was originally owned by the Keokuk & Hamilton Bridge Company, but following financial problems in the 1940s, the bridge was given to the City of Keokuk in late 1948.

The bridge was originally the western terminus of the Toledo, Peoria & Western Railroad. Today, it serves the Keokuk Junction Railway with occasional train crossings for interconnection and river terminal services. Only the Keokuk side of the highway bridge has been converted, the bridge's upper highway deck is abandoned. The river traffic (barges and boats) have the right-of-way, so the swing section remains open until a train needs to cross the river.

On the Illinois side of the bridge, two precast concrete barriers prevent auto traffic from driving on to the old highway section.

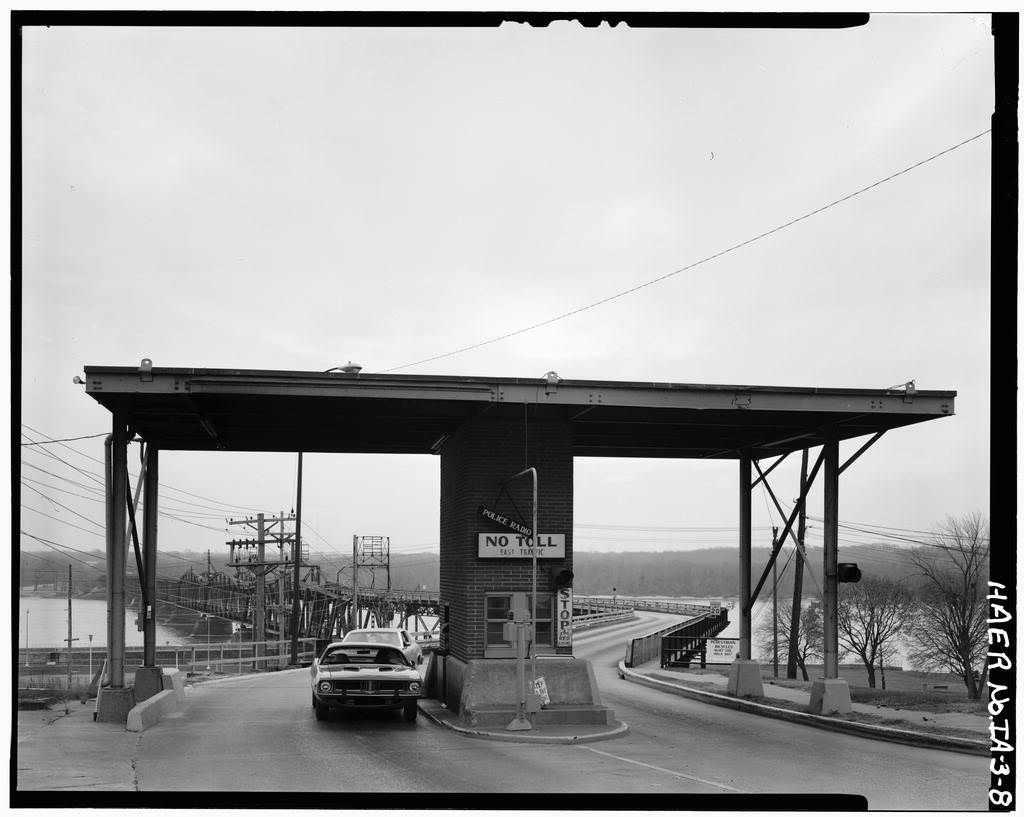
Toll booth on Keokuk Rail Bridge, 1982

The bridge was documented as survey number IA-3 by the Historic American Engineering Record, archived in the Library of Congress.

== See also ==
- List of crossings of the Upper Mississippi River
- List of bridges documented by the Historic American Engineering Record in Illinois
- List of bridges documented by the Historic American Engineering Record in Iowa
- Lock and Dam No. 19
