= Lyman Township, Illinois =

Township in Illinois, US

Lyman Township
- Township
- Location in Ford County

- Ford County's location in Illinois
- Coordinates: 40°37′19″N 88°10′29″W
- Country: United States
- State: Illinois
- County: Ford
- Established: September 9, 1867

Area
  - Total: 42.19 sq mi (109.3 km^{2})
  - Land: 42.12 sq mi (109.1 km^{2})
  - Water: 0.07 sq mi (0.18 km^{2}) 0.17%
- Elevation: 748 ft (228 m)

Population (2020)
  - Total: 516
  - Density: 12.3/sq mi (4.73/km^{2})
- Time zone: UTC-6 (CST)
  - Summer (DST): UTC-5 (CDT)
- ZIP codes: 60952, 60962, 60968
- FIPS code: 17-053-45252

Lyman Township is one of twelve townships in Ford County, Illinois, USA. As of the 2020 census, its population was 516 and it contained 260 housing units. The township was formed from a portion of Brenton Township on September 9, 1867.

== Geography ==
According to the 2021 census gazetteer files, Lyman Township has a total area of 42.19 square miles (109.27 km^{2}), of which 42.12 square miles (109.09 km^{2}) (or 99.83%) is land and 0.07 square miles (0.18 km^{2}) (or 0.17%) is water.

=== Cities, towns, villages ===
- Roberts

=== Major highways ===
- Illinois Route 54
- Illinois Route 115

=== Airports and landing strips ===
- John H Garrelts Airport
- Otto Junior Airport
- Roberts RLA Airport. Roberts RLA is now closed and is cropland.

== Demographics ==
As of the 2020 census there were 516 people, 249 households, and 172 families residing in the township. The population density was 12.23 inhabitants per square mile (4.72/km^{2}). There were 260 housing units at an average density of 6.16 per square mile (2.38/km^{2}). The racial makeup of the township was 91.47% White, 0.39% African American, 0.39% Native American, 0.39% Asian, 0.00% Pacific Islander, 2.13% from other races, and 5.23% from two or more races. Hispanic or Latino of any race were 6.40% of the population.

There were 249 households, out of which 28.50% had children under the age of 18 living with them, 50.60% were married couples living together, 10.44% had a female householder with no spouse present, and 30.92% were non-families. 24.10% of all households were made up of individuals, and 7.60% had someone living alone who was 65 years of age or older. The average household size was 2.43 and the average family size was 2.81.

The township's age distribution consisted of 23.8% under the age of 18, 12.4% from 18 to 24, 16.5% from 25 to 44, 33.3% from 45 to 64, and 13.9% who were 65 years of age or older. The median age was 44.1 years. For every 100 females, there were 92.4 males. For every 100 females age 18 and over, there were 99.1 males.

The median income for a household in the township was $44,432, and the median income for a family was $55,147. Males had a median income of $40,278 versus $20,556 for females. The per capita income for the township was $21,860. About 19.8% of families and 28.0% of the population were below the poverty line, including 45.4% of those under age 18 and 11.9% of those age 65 or over.

Historical population
Census	Pop.	Note	%±
2000	616		—
2010	518		−15.9%
2020	516		−0.4%
U.S. Decennial Census

== School districts ==
- Gibson City-Melvin-Sibley Community Unit School District 5
- Iroquois West Community Unit School District 10
- Paxton-Buckley-Loda Community Unit School District 10
- Prairie Central Community Unit School District 8
- Tri Point Community Unit School District 6-J

== Political districts ==
- Illinois' 15th congressional district
- State House District 105
- State Senate District 53
