= Dix Township, Illinois =

Township in Illinois, US

Dix Township
- Township
- Location in Ford County

- Ford County's location in Illinois
- Coordinates: 40°27′58″N 88°17′29″W
- Country: United States
- State: Illinois
- County: Ford
- Established: November 6, 1860

Area
  - Total: 54.00 sq mi (139.9 km^{2})
  - Land: 53.95 sq mi (139.7 km^{2})
  - Water: 0.06 sq mi (0.16 km^{2}) 0.10%
- Elevation: 768 ft (234 m)

Population (2020)
  - Total: 598
  - Density: 11.1/sq mi (4.28/km^{2})
- Time zone: UTC-6 (CST)
  - Summer (DST): UTC-5 (CDT)
- ZIP codes: 60933, 60936, 60952, 60957
- FIPS code: 17-053-20110

Dix Township is one of twelve townships in Ford County, Illinois, USA. As of the 2020 census, its population was 598 and it contained 268 housing units.

== History ==
Dix Township was originally named Drummer Grove Township; on September 2, 1864 it was renamed named in honor of John Adams Dix.

== Geography ==
According to the 2021 census gazetteer files, Dix Township has a total area of 54.00 square miles (139.86 km^{2}), of which 53.95 square miles (139.73 km^{2}) (or 99.90%) is land and 0.06 square miles (0.16 km^{2}) (or 0.10%) is water.

=== Cities, towns, villages ===
- Elliott

=== Unincorporated towns ===
- Guthrie

=== Cemeteries ===
The township contains these three cemeteries: Blackford, Oregon, and Pontoppidan.

=== Major highways ===
- Illinois Route 9
- Illinois Route 54

=== Airports and landing strips ===
- Barnes Landing Strip
- Gibson City Municipal Airport

== Demographics ==
As of the 2020 census there were 598 people, 260 households, and 173 families residing in the township. The population density was 11.07 inhabitants per square mile (4.27/km^{2}). There were 268 housing units at an average density of 4.96 per square mile (1.92/km^{2}). The racial makeup of the township was 95.65% White, 0.17% African American, 0.33% Native American, 0.50% Asian, 0.00% Pacific Islander, 0.33% from other races, and 3.01% from two or more races. Hispanic or Latino of any race were 0.67% of the population.

There were 260 households, out of which 20.00% had children under the age of 18 living with them, 53.08% were married couples living together, 8.46% had a female householder with no spouse present, and 33.46% were non-families. 31.50% of all households were made up of individuals, and 11.90% had someone living alone who was 65 years of age or older. The average household size was 2.03 and the average family size was 2.44.

The township's age distribution consisted of 18.0% under the age of 18, 7.8% from 18 to 24, 20.2% from 25 to 44, 33.3% from 45 to 64, and 20.8% who were 65 years of age or older. The median age was 51.5 years. For every 100 females, there were 106.6 males. For every 100 females age 18 and over, there were 120.3 males.

The median income for a household in the township was $54,000, and the median income for a family was $54,107. Males had a median income of $53,125 versus $28,750 for females. The per capita income for the township was $37,722. About 9.8% of families and 9.7% of the population were below the poverty line, including 18.5% of those under age 18 and 7.3% of those age 65 or over.

Historical population
Census	Pop.	Note	%±
2000	689		—
2010	642		−6.8%
2020	598		−6.9%
U.S. Decennial Census

== School districts ==
- Gibson City-Melvin-Sibley Community Unit School District 5

== Political districts ==
- Illinois' 15th congressional district
- State House District 105
- State Senate District 53
