= Button Township, Illinois =

Township in Illinois, US

Button Township
- Township
- Location in Ford County

- Ford County's location in Illinois
- Coordinates: 40°26′54″N 87°59′36″W
- Country: United States
- State: Illinois
- County: Ford
- Established: December 1864

Area
  - Total: 34.08 sq mi (88.3 km^{2})
  - Land: 34.03 sq mi (88.1 km^{2})
  - Water: 0.06 sq mi (0.16 km^{2}) 0.16%
- Elevation: 784 ft (239 m)

Population (2020)
  - Total: 232
  - Density: 6.82/sq mi (2.63/km^{2})
- Time zone: UTC-6 (CST)
  - Summer (DST): UTC-5 (CDT)
- ZIP codes: 60957, 60960
- FIPS code: 17-053-10214

Button Township is one of twelve townships in Ford County, Illinois, USA. As of the 2020 census, its population was 232 and it contained 108 housing units. The township was formed from a portion of Patton Township in December 1864.

== History ==
Button Township was named for James Porter Button, Sr. (1822-1866), who served as township supervisor, justice of the peace, and county treasurer.

== Geography ==
According to the 2021 census gazetteer files, Button Township has a total area of 34.08 square miles (88.27 km^{2}), of which 34.03 square miles (88.14 km^{2}) (or 99.84%) is land and 0.06 square miles (0.16 km^{2}) (or 0.16%) is water.

=== Unincorporated towns ===
- Clarence

=== Cemeteries ===
The township contains these three cemeteries: Mount Olivet, Pleasant Grove and Trickle Grove.

=== Major highways ===
- Illinois Route 9

== Demographics ==
As of the 2020 census there were 232 people, 109 households, and 67 families residing in the township. The population density was 6.81 inhabitants per square mile (2.63/km^{2}). There were 108 housing units at an average density of 3.17 per square mile (1.22/km^{2}). The racial makeup of the township was 98.71% White, 0.00% African American, 0.00% Native American, 0.00% Asian, 0.00% Pacific Islander, 0.00% from other races, and 1.29% from two or more races. Hispanic or Latino of any race were 1.72% of the population.

There were 109 households, out of which 20.20% had children under the age of 18 living with them, 58.72% were married couples living together, 2.75% had a female householder with no spouse present, and 38.53% were non-families. 38.50% of all households were made up of individuals, and 3.70% had someone living alone who was 65 years of age or older. The average household size was 2.34 and the average family size was 3.18.

The township's age distribution consisted of 23.1% under the age of 18, 5.9% from 18 to 24, 25.9% from 25 to 44, 31.8% from 45 to 64, and 13.3% who were 65 years of age or older. The median age was 42.4 years. For every 100 females, there were 150.0 males. For every 100 females age 18 and over, there were 122.7 males.

The median income for a household in the township was $81,458, and the median income for a family was $80,208. Males had a median income of $52,500 versus $17,417 for females. The per capita income for the township was $36,136. None of the population was below the poverty line.

Historical population
Census	Pop.	Note	%±
1990	299		—
2000	321		7.4%
2010	281		−12.5%
2020	232		−17.4%
U.S. Decennial Census

== School districts ==
- Hoopeston Area Community Unit School District 11
- Paxton-Buckley-Loda Community Unit School District 10

== Political districts ==
- Illinois' 15th congressional district
- State House District 106
- State Senate District 53
