= Peach Orchard Township, Illinois =

Township in Illinois, US

Peach Orchard Township
- Township
- Location in Ford County

- Ford County's location in Illinois
- Coordinates: 40°34′33″N 88°16′37″W
- Country: United States
- State: Illinois
- County: Ford
- Established: September 14, 1868

Area
  - Total: 24.20 sq mi (62.7 km^{2})
  - Land: 24.20 sq mi (62.7 km^{2})
  - Water: 0 sq mi (0 km^{2}) 0%
- Elevation: 751 ft (229 m)

Population (2020)
  - Total: 551
  - Density: 22.8/sq mi (8.79/km^{2})
- Time zone: UTC-6 (CST)
  - Summer (DST): UTC-5 (CDT)
- ZIP codes: 60936, 60952
- FIPS code: 17-053-58317

Peach Orchard Township is one of twelve townships in Ford County, Illinois, USA. As of the 2020 census, its population was 551 and it contained 255 housing units. It was formed from a portion of Sullivant Township on September 14, 1868.

== Geography ==
According to the 2021 census gazetteer files, Peach Orchard Township has a total area of 24.20 square miles (62.68 km^{2}), all land.

=== Cities, towns, villages ===
- Melvin

=== Cemeteries ===
The township contains Melvin Cemetery.

=== Major highways ===
- Illinois Route 54

== Demographics ==
As of the 2020 census there were 551 people, 234 households, and 150 families residing in the township. The population density was 22.77 inhabitants per square mile (8.79/km^{2}). There were 255 housing units at an average density of 10.54 per square mile (4.07/km^{2}). The racial makeup of the township was 91.83% White, 0.00% African American, 0.54% Native American, 0.73% Asian, 0.00% Pacific Islander, 1.09% from other races, and 5.81% from two or more races. Hispanic or Latino of any race were 5.08% of the population.

There were 234 households, out of which 26.90% had children under the age of 18 living with them, 47.44% were married couples living together, 10.26% had a female householder with no spouse present, and 35.90% were non-families. 32.90% of all households were made up of individuals, and 12.00% had someone living alone who was 65 years of age or older. The average household size was 2.33 and the average family size was 2.85.

The township's age distribution consisted of 25.0% under the age of 18, 6.6% from 18 to 24, 26.6% from 25 to 44, 30.2% from 45 to 64, and 11.7% who were 65 years of age or older. The median age was 41.4 years. For every 100 females, there were 127.1 males. For every 100 females age 18 and over, there were 118.7 males.

The median income for a household in the township was $49,583, and the median income for a family was $48,750. Males had a median income of $44,375 versus $18,250 for females. The per capita income for the township was $36,817. About 27.3% of families and 22.1% of the population were below the poverty line, including 22.5% of those under age 18 and 1.6% of those age 65 or over.

Historical population
| Census | Pop. | Note | %± |
|---|---|---|---|
| 2000 | 618 | | — |
| 2010 | 608 | | −1.6% |
| 2020 | 551 | | −9.4% |
U.S. Decennial Census

== School districts ==
- Gibson City-Melvin-Sibley Community Unit School District 5

== Political districts ==
- Illinois' 15th congressional district
- State House District 105
- State Senate District 53
