= Brenton Township, Illinois =

Township in Illinois, US

Brenton Township
- Township
- Location in Ford County

- Ford County's location in Illinois
- Coordinates: 40°42′56″N 88°10′46″W
- Country: United States
- State: Illinois
- County: Ford
- Established: March 15, 1859

Area
  - Total: 36.01 sq mi (93.3 km^{2})
  - Land: 35.99 sq mi (93.2 km^{2})
  - Water: 0.02 sq mi (0.052 km^{2}) 0.05%
- Elevation: 699 ft (213 m)

Population (2020)
  - Total: 861
  - Density: 23.9/sq mi (9.24/km^{2})
- Time zone: UTC-6 (CST)
  - Summer (DST): UTC-5 (CDT)
- ZIP codes: 60921, 60955, 60959, 60962, 60968
- FIPS code: 17-053-07978

Brenton Township is one of twelve townships in Ford County, Illinois, USA. As of the 2020 census, its population was 861 and it contained 413 housing units. The township was originally called Stockton Township and was formed from a portion of Patton Township on March 15, 1859; the name was changed to Brenton Township on May 9, 1864.

== Geography ==
According to the 2021 census gazetteer files, Brenton Township has a total area of 36.01 square miles (93.27 km^{2}), of which 35.99 square miles (93.21 km^{2}) (or 99.95%) is land and 0.02 square miles (0.05 km^{2}) (or 0.05%) is water.

=== Cities, towns, villages ===
- Piper City (vast majority)

=== Cemeteries ===
The township contains Brewton Cemetery.

=== Major highways ===
- US Route 24
- Illinois Route 115

=== Airports and landing strips ===
- Bradbury Airport

== Demographics ==
As of the 2020 census there were 861 people, 450 households, and 307 families residing in the township. The population density was 23.91 inhabitants per square mile (9.23/km^{2}). There were 413 housing units at an average density of 11.47 per square mile (4.43/km^{2}). The racial makeup of the township was 87.92% White, 0.12% African American, 0.23% Native American, 0.58% Asian, 0.00% Pacific Islander, 4.65% from other races, and 6.50% from two or more races. Hispanic or Latino of any race were 8.59% of the population.

There were 450 households, out of which 37.80% had children under the age of 18 living with them, 40.89% were married couples living together, 20.22% had a female householder with no spouse present, and 31.78% were non-families. 27.60% of all households were made up of individuals, and 10.40% had someone living alone who was 65 years of age or older. The average household size was 2.14 and the average family size was 2.52.

The township's age distribution consisted of 19.9% under the age of 18, 11.9% from 18 to 24, 20.4% from 25 to 44, 32.8% from 45 to 64, and 15.0% who were 65 years of age or older. The median age was 44.3 years. For every 100 females, there were 97.3 males. For every 100 females age 18 and over, there were 90.4 males.

The median income for a household in the township was $37,500, and the median income for a family was $40,987. Males had a median income of $35,000 versus $23,500 for females. The per capita income for the township was $23,326. About 21.8% of families and 20.9% of the population were below the poverty line, including 39.8% of those under age 18 and 1.8% of those age 65 or over.

Historical population
Census	Pop.	Note	%±
2000	892		—
2010	973		9.1%
2020	861		−11.5%
U.S. Decennial Census

== School districts ==
- Iroquois West Community Unit School District 10
- Prairie Central Community Unit School District 8
- Tri Point Community Unit School District 6-J

== Political districts ==
- Illinois' 15th congressional district
- State House District 105
- State Senate District 53
