= Drummer Township, Illinois =

Township in Illinois, US

Drummer Township
- Township
- Location in Ford County

- Ford County's location in Illinois
- Coordinates: 40°27′52″N 88°24′16″W
- Country: United States
- State: Illinois
- County: Ford
- Established: March 1, 1869

Area
  - Total: 53.68 sq mi (139.0 km^{2})
  - Land: 53.49 sq mi (138.5 km^{2})
  - Water: 0.19 sq mi (0.49 km^{2}) 0.36%
- Elevation: 745 ft (227 m)

Population (2020)
  - Total: 4,046
  - Density: 75.64/sq mi (29.20/km^{2})
- Time zone: UTC-6 (CST)
  - Summer (DST): UTC-5 (CDT)
- ZIP codes: 60936, 61845
- FIPS code: 17-053-20799

Drummer Township is one of twelve townships in Ford County, Illinois, USA. As of the 2020 census, its population was 4,046 and it contained 1,912 housing units.

== History ==
The township was formed from a portion of Dix Township (originally named Drummer Grove Township) on March 1, 1869. Drummer Township is named after a hunting dog called Drummer, who died while chasing a deer and was buried in what became known as Drummer Grove.

== Geography ==
According to the 2021 census gazetteer files, Drummer Township has a total area of 53.68 square miles (139.03 km^{2}), of which 53.49 square miles (138.54 km^{2}) (or 99.64%) is land and 0.19 square miles (0.49 km^{2}) (or 0.36%) is water.

=== Cities, towns, villages ===
- Gibson City

=== Extinct towns ===
- Derby
- Garber
- Harpster
- Proctor

=== Cemeteries ===
The township contains Drummer Township Cemetery.

=== Major highways ===
- Illinois Route 9
- Illinois Route 47
- Illinois Route 54

=== Airports and landing strips ===
- Gibson Community Hospital Heliport
- Wright Airport

== Demographics ==
As of the 2020 census there were 4,046 people, 1,838 households, and 1,004 families residing in the township. The population density was 75.38 inhabitants per square mile (29.10/km^{2}). There were 1,912 housing units at an average density of 35.62 per square mile (13.75/km^{2}). The racial makeup of the township was 92.96% White, 0.72% African American, 0.07% Native American, 0.77% Asian, 0.00% Pacific Islander, 1.06% from other races, and 4.42% from two or more races. Hispanic or Latino of any race were 3.02% of the population.

There were 1,838 households, out of which 29.00% had children under the age of 18 living with them, 44.56% were married couples living together, 8.27% had a female householder with no spouse present, and 45.38% were non-families. 42.90% of all households were made up of individuals, and 12.80% had someone living alone who was 65 years of age or older. The average household size was 2.04 and the average family size was 2.84.

The township's age distribution consisted of 21.8% under the age of 18, 5.7% from 18 to 24, 23.2% from 25 to 44, 28.7% from 45 to 64, and 20.4% who were 65 years of age or older. The median age was 44.7 years. For every 100 females, there were 90.3 males. For every 100 females age 18 and over, there were 85.6 males.

The median income for a household in the township was $45,718, and the median income for a family was $77,841. Males had a median income of $52,169 versus $32,250 for females. The per capita income for the township was $31,050. About 6.0% of families and 9.7% of the population were below the poverty line, including 8.6% of those under age 18 and 3.9% of those age 65 or over.

Historical population
Census	Pop.	Note	%±
2000	3,897		—
2010	4,023		3.2%
2020	4,046		0.6%
U.S. Decennial Census

== School districts ==
- Gibson City-Melvin-Sibley Community Unit School District 5

== Political districts ==
- Illinois' 15th congressional district
- State House District 105
- State Senate District 53
