= Derby, Ford County, Illinois =

Derby, Illinois
- Unincorporated community
- Location within Illinois Location within the United States
- Coordinates: 40°26′30″N 88°26′33″W
- Country: United States
- State: Illinois
- County: Ford
- Township: Drummer
- Elevation: 758 ft (231 m)
- Time zone: UTC-6 (Central (CST))
  - Summer (DST): UTC-5 (CDT)
- Area code: 217
- GNIS feature ID: 422621

Derby is an unincorporated community in Ford County, Illinois, United States. Derby is located southwest of Gibson City, and its zip code, 60936, is associated with Gibson City.
