= Dallas City Township, Hancock County, Illinois =

Dallas City Township
- Township
- Township community building in Dallas City

- Location in Hancock County

- Hancock County's location in Illinois
- Coordinates: 40°35′44″N 91°09′42″W
- Country: United States
- State: Illinois
- County: Hancock
- Established: 1860

Area
  - Total: 15.50 sq mi (40.1 km^{2})
  - Land: 15.37 sq mi (39.8 km^{2})
  - Water: 0.13 sq mi (0.34 km^{2}) 0.85%
- Elevation: 659 ft (201 m)

Population (2020)
  - Total: 864
  - Density: 56.2/sq mi (21.7/km^{2})
- Time zone: UTC-6 (CST)
  - Summer (DST): UTC-5 (CDT)
- ZIP codes: 62330, 62358
- FIPS code: 17-067-18433

Dallas City Township is one of twenty-four townships in Hancock County, Illinois, USA. As of the 2020 census, its population was 864 and it contained 488 housing units. It was formed from Pontoosuc Township in 1860.

== Geography ==
According to the 2021 census gazetteer files, Dallas City Township has a total area of 15.50 square miles (40.14 km^{2}), of which 15.37 square miles (39.81 km^{2}) (or 99.15%) is land and 0.13 square miles (0.34 km^{2}) (or 0.85%) is water.

=== Cities, towns, villages ===
- Dallas City (south half)

=== Unincorporated towns ===
- Colusa at 40.570876°N 91.167923°W

(This list is based on USGS data and may include former settlements.)

=== Cemeteries ===
The township contains Harris Cemetery.

=== Major highways ===
- Illinois Route 9
- Illinois Route 96

== Demographics ==
Historical population
Census	Pop.	Note	%±
1880	1,137		—
1890	1,021		−10.2%
1900	1,147		12.3%
1910	1,371		19.5%
1920	1,274		−7.1%
1930	1,255		−1.5%
1940	1,261		0.5%
1950	1,316		4.4%
1960	1,328		0.9%
1970	1,297		−2.3%
1980	1,395		7.6%
1990	1,082		−22.4%
2000	1,089		0.6%
2010	996		−8.5%
2020	864		−13.3%
U.S. Decennial Census

As of the 2020 census there were 864 people, 474 households, and 294 families residing in the township. The population density was 55.75 inhabitants per square mile (21.53/km^{2}). There were 488 housing units at an average density of 31.49 per square mile (12.16/km^{2}). The racial makeup of the township was 97.57% White, 0.12% African American, 0.35% Native American, 0.23% Asian, 0.00% Pacific Islander, 0.35% from other races, and 1.39% from two or more races. Hispanic or Latino of any race were 0.58% of the population.

There were 474 households, out of which 28.30% had children under the age of 18 living with them, 35.65% were married couples living together, 20.04% had a female householder with no spouse present, and 37.97% were non-families. 35.40% of all households were made up of individuals, and 17.70% had someone living alone who was 65 years of age or older. The average household size was 2.27 and the average family size was 2.77.

The township's age distribution consisted of 26.5% under the age of 18, 3.6% from 18 to 24, 16.1% from 25 to 44, 32.7% from 45 to 64, and 21.1% who were 65 years of age or older. The median age was 45.7 years. For every 100 females, there were 111.0 males. For every 100 females age 18 and over, there were 87.4 males.

The median income for a household in the township was $48,182, and the median income for a family was $55,833. Males had a median income of $30,625 versus $35,607 for females. The per capita income for the township was $24,891. About 7.8% of families and 12.7% of the population were below the poverty line, including 18.1% of those under age 18 and 7.3% of those age 65 or over.

== School districts ==
The following school districts take portions of the township:

- Dallas Elementary School District 327 and Illini West High School District 307
- Nauvoo-Colusa Community Unit School District 325

== Political districts ==
- Illinois's 17th congressional district
- State House District 94
- State Senate District 47
