= Pella Township, Illinois =

Township in Illinois, US

Pella Township
- Township
- Location in Ford County

- Ford County's location in Illinois
- Coordinates: 40°48′26″N 88°10′36″W
- Country: United States
- State: Illinois
- County: Ford
- Established: March 2, 1870

Area
  - Total: 36.15 sq mi (93.6 km^{2})
  - Land: 36.15 sq mi (93.6 km^{2})
  - Water: 0 sq mi (0 km^{2}) 0%
- Elevation: 660 ft (200 m)

Population (2020)
  - Total: 160
  - Density: 4.4/sq mi (1.7/km^{2})
- Time zone: UTC-6 (CST)
  - Summer (DST): UTC-5 (CDT)
- ZIP codes: 60929, 60959
- FIPS code: 17-053-58512

Pella Township is one of twelve townships in Ford County, Illinois, USA. As of the 2020 census, its population was 160 and it contained 81 housing units. It was formed as Clyde Township from a portion of Brenton Township on March 2, 1870; its name was changed to Pella Township on June 16, 1870.

== Geography ==
According to the 2021 census gazetteer files, Pella Township has a total area of 36.15 square miles (93.63 km^{2}), all land.

=== Cities, towns, villages ===
- Piper City (South edge)

=== Major highways ===
- Illinois Route 115

=== Airports and landing strips ===
- Read Airport

== Demographics ==
As of the 2020 census there were 160 people, 92 households, and 69 families residing in the township. The population density was 4.43 inhabitants per square mile (1.71/km^{2}). There were 81 housing units at an average density of 2.24 per square mile (0.86/km^{2}). The racial makeup of the township was 89.38% White, 0.00% African American, 1.25% Native American, 1.25% Asian, 0.00% Pacific Islander, 1.88% from other races, and 6.25% from two or more races. Hispanic or Latino of any race were 5.00% of the population.

There were 92 households, out of which 8.70% had children under the age of 18 living with them, 71.74% were married couples living together, 3.26% had a female householder with no spouse present, and 25.00% were non-families. 13.00% of all households were made up of individuals, and 6.50% had someone living alone who was 65 years of age or older. The average household size was 1.98 and the average family size was 2.29.

The township's age distribution consisted of 9.3% under the age of 18, 0.0% from 18 to 24, 8.7% from 25 to 44, 64.8% from 45 to 64, and 17.0% who were 65 years of age or older. The median age was 60.6 years. For every 100 females, there were 111.6 males. For every 100 females age 18 and over, there were 111.5 males.

The median income for a household in the township was $81,667, and the median income for a family was $81,875. Males had a median income of $49,063 versus $36,875 for females. The per capita income for the township was $38,369. About 0.0% of families and 2.7% of the population were below the poverty line, including 0.0% of those under age 18 and 0.0% of those age 65 or over.

Historical population
| Census | Pop. | Note | %± |
|---|---|---|---|
| 2000 | 209 | | — |
| 2010 | 176 | | −15.8% |
| 2020 | 160 | | −9.1% |
U.S. Decennial Census

== School districts ==
- Iroquois West Community Unit School District 10
- Tri Point Community Unit School District 6-J

== Political districts ==
- Illinois' 15th congressional district
- State House District 105
- State Senate District 53
