= Patton Township =

Patton Township may refer to:

- Patton Township, Ford County, Illinois
- Patton Township, Centre County, Pennsylvania
