= GCMS =

GCMS may refer to:

- Gas chromatography–mass spectrometry, an analytical method to identify different substances within a test sample
- Gibson City-Melvin-Sibley Community Unit School District 5, a K–12 public school district based in Gibson City, Illinois
- Global Case Management System is a software system used by Immigration, Refugees and Citizenship Canada (IRCC) to process immigration and citizenship applications. Information extracted from this software system is often referred to as GCMS Notes.
