= Patton Township, Illinois =

Township in Illinois, US

Patton Township
- Township
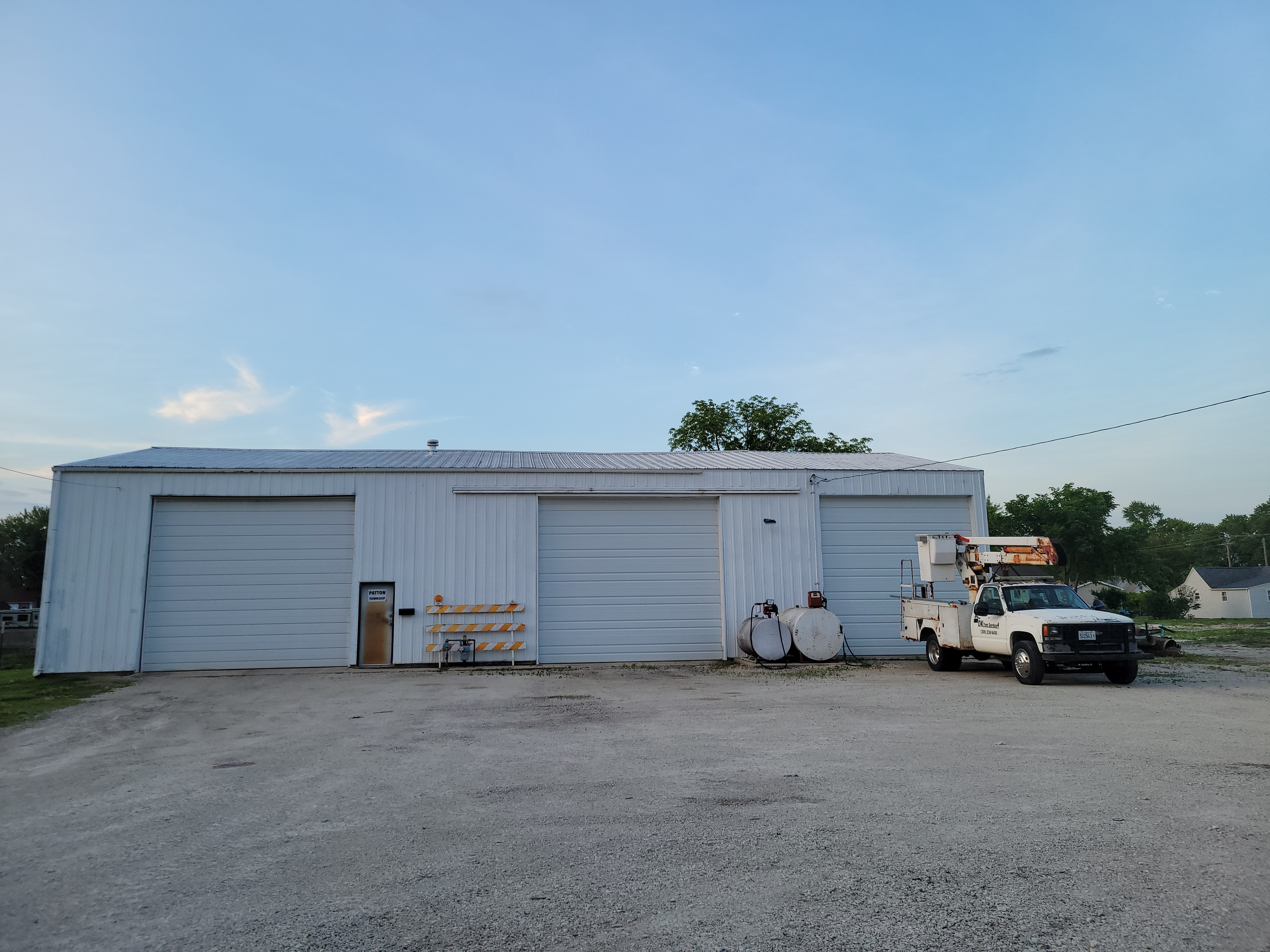
- Patton Township building in Paxton, Illinois

- Location in Ford County

- Ford County's location in Illinois
- Coordinates: 40°26′47″N 88°08′23″W
- Country: United States
- State: Illinois
- County: Ford
- Established: November 6, 1860

Area
  - Total: 61.36 sq mi (158.9 km^{2})
  - Land: 61.28 sq mi (158.7 km^{2})
  - Water: 0.08 sq mi (0.21 km^{2}) 0.14%
- Elevation: 761 ft (232 m)

Population (2020)
  - Total: 5,253
  - Density: 85.72/sq mi (33.10/km^{2})
- Time zone: UTC-6 (CST)
  - Summer (DST): UTC-5 (CDT)
- ZIP codes: 60949, 60957
- FIPS code: 17-053-58122

Patton Township is located in Ford County, Illinois, United States. As of the 2020 census, its population was 5,253 and it contained 2,332 housing units. It was named Prairie City Township when established as a township in Vermilion County; its name was changed to Patton Township on September 14, 1857.

== Geography ==
According to the 2021 census gazetteer files, Patton Township has a total area of 61.36 square miles (158.92 km^{2}), of which 61.28 square miles (158.71 km^{2}) (or 99.86%) is land and 0.08 square miles (0.21 km^{2}) (or 0.14%) is water.

=== Paxton ===
Paxton, the county seat, is the largest town in Patton Township.

=== Perdueville ===
Perdueville is an unincorporated area in section 9 of Patton township. Extant structures include a grain elevator which is still in service next to the rail grade, now removed. The Perdueville Pheasant Habitat Area is located in section 32 of the township. The habitat area was purchased in 1995 and consists of 122 acres (0.49 km^{2}).

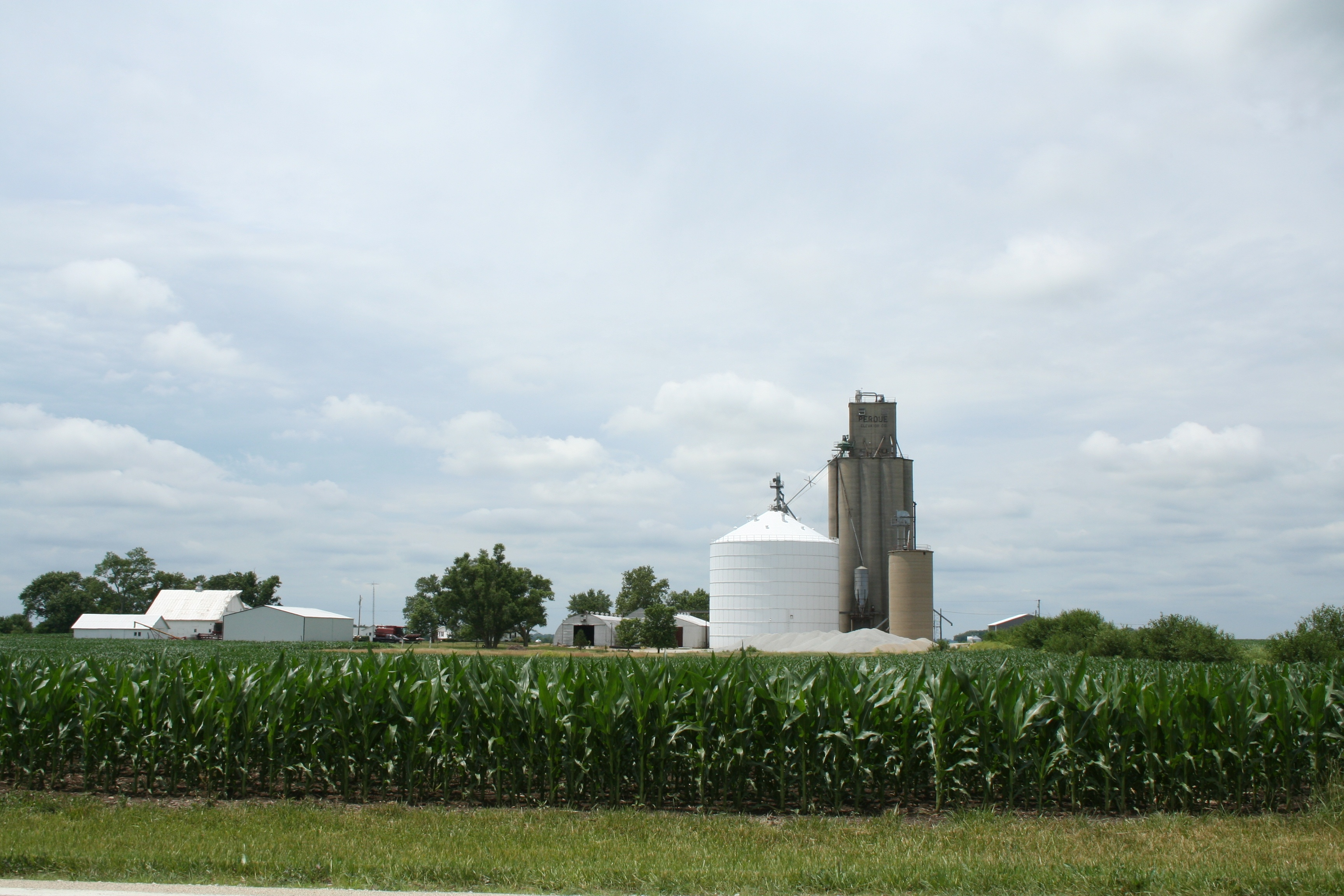
Perdueville grain elevator in section 9 of the township.

=== Ten Mile Grove ===
Ten Mile Grove is said to be the earliest settlement in Patton Township with about a dozen families residing there in 1853. It was located on the Danville-Ottawa road and named such because it was ten miles (16 km) from the nearest settlement. The grove is partly contained in the Howard Thomas Memorial Nature Preserve. The preserve, containing many Bur oak, sustained damage in a 2004 wind storm which felled numerous trees. Thirty to fifty percent of trees were felled in some portions, especially the western part. Volunteers cleared trees from the trails, one of which had 17 trees blocking it.

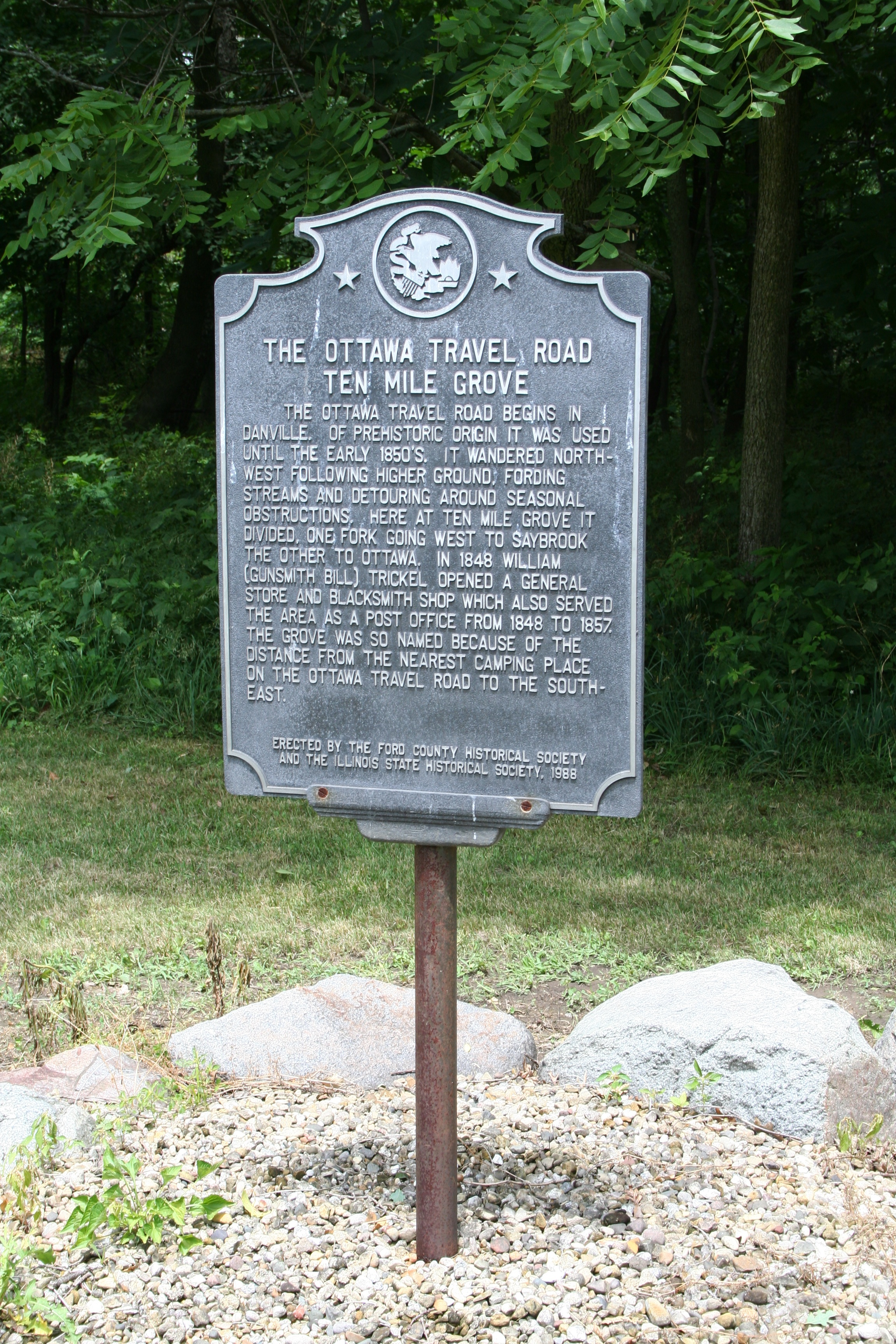
Sign marking Ten Mile Grove

=== Cemeteries ===
The township contains these seven cemeteries: Farmersville, Glen, Hall, Meharry, Pells Park, Prospect and Ten Mile Grove.

=== Major highways ===
- Interstate 57
- US Route 45
- Illinois Route 9

=== Airports and landing strips ===
- C D Maulding Airport
- Clifford D Foster Airport
- Paxton Airport

== Demographics ==
As of the 2020 census there were 5,253 people, 2,004 households, and 1,317 families residing in the township. The population density was 85.60 inhabitants per square mile (33.05/km^{2}). There were 2,332 housing units at an average density of 38.00 per square mile (14.67/km^{2}). The racial makeup of the township was 90.88% White, 0.76% African American, 0.29% Native American, 0.27% Asian, 0.00% Pacific Islander, 1.71% from other races, and 6.09% from two or more races. Hispanic or Latino of any race were 4.70% of the population.

There were 2,004 households, out of which 32.10% had children under the age of 18 living with them, 51.15% were married couples living together, 11.43% had a female householder with no spouse present, and 34.28% were non-families. 32.80% of all households were made up of individuals, and 14.10% had someone living alone who was 65 years of age or older. The average household size was 2.36 and the average family size was 2.99.

The township's age distribution consisted of 25.8% under the age of 18, 6.7% from 18 to 24, 23.8% from 25 to 44, 23.6% from 45 to 64, and 20.0% who were 65 years of age or older. The median age was 39.8 years. For every 100 females, there were 100.1 males. For every 100 females age 18 and over, there were 96.4 males.

The median income for a household in the township was $55,357, and the median income for a family was $72,098. Males had a median income of $48,711 versus $28,438 for females. The per capita income for the township was $27,217. About 8.1% of families and 12.4% of the population were below the poverty line, including 21.5% of those under age 18 and 4.7% of those age 65 or over.

Historical population
Census	Pop.	Note	%±
2000	5,379		—
2010	5,358		−0.4%
2020	5,253		−2.0%
U.S. Decennial Census

== School districts ==
- Paxton-Buckley-Loda Community Unit School District 10

== Political districts ==
- Illinois' 15th congressional district
- State House District 105
- State Senate District 53
