= Wall Township =

Wall Township may refer to the following places in the United States:

- Wall Township, Ford County, Illinois
- Wall Township, New Jersey

== See also ==
- Walls Township, Traverse County, Minnesota
