= Mona Township, Illinois =

Township in Illinois, US

Mona Township
- Township
- Location in Ford County

- Ford County's location in Illinois
- Coordinates: 40°53′21″N 88°10′56″W
- Country: United States
- State: Illinois
- County: Ford
- Established: March 2, 1870

Area
  - Total: 36.18 sq mi (93.7 km^{2})
  - Land: 36.18 sq mi (93.7 km^{2})
  - Water: 0 sq mi (0 km^{2}) 0%
- Elevation: 659 ft (201 m)

Population (2020)
  - Total: 267
  - Density: 7.38/sq mi (2.85/km^{2})
- Time zone: UTC-6 (CST)
  - Summer (DST): UTC-5 (CDT)
- ZIP codes: 60929, 60946
- FIPS code: 17-053-49919

Mona Township is one of twelve townships in Ford County, Illinois, USA. As of the 2020 census, its population was 267 and it contained 130 housing units. The township was formed as Delhi Township from a portion of Rogers Township on March 2, 1870; its name was changed to Mona Township on June 16, 1870.

== Geography ==
According to the 2021 census gazetteer files, Mona Township has a total area of 36.18 square miles (93.71 km^{2}), all land.

=== Cities, towns, villages ===
- Kempton (south three-quarters)

=== Cemeteries ===
The township contains Mona Township Cemetery.

=== Major highways ===
- Illinois Route 115
- Illinois Route 116

== Demographics ==
As of the 2020 census there were 267 people, 161 households, and 65 families residing in the township. The population density was 7.38 inhabitants per square mile (2.85/km^{2}). There were 130 housing units at an average density of 3.59 per square mile (1.39/km^{2}). The racial makeup of the township was 94.76% White, 0.37% African American, 0.00% Native American, 0.00% Asian, 0.00% Pacific Islander, 3.37% from other races, and 1.50% from two or more races. Hispanic or Latino of any race were 3.37% of the population.

There were 161 households, out of which 19.90% had children under the age of 18 living with them, 24.84% were married couples living together, 6.21% had a female householder with no spouse present, and 59.63% were non-families. 37.90% of all households were made up of individuals, and 11.80% had someone living alone who was 65 years of age or older. The average household size was 2.28 and the average family size was 3.11.

The township's age distribution consisted of 22.3% under the age of 18, 13.9% from 18 to 24, 36.3% from 25 to 44, 14.8% from 45 to 64, and 12.8% who were 65 years of age or older. The median age was 35.7 years. For every 100 females, there were 61.0 males. For every 100 females age 18 and over, there were 61.9 males.

The median income for a household in the township was $52,188, and the median income for a family was $66,250. Males had a median income of $40,357 versus $36,638 for females. The per capita income for the township was $27,264. About 9.2% of families and 24.3% of the population were below the poverty line, including 40.2% of those under age 18 and 0.0% of those age 65 or over.

Historical population
| Census | Pop. | Note | %± |
|---|---|---|---|
| 2000 | 490 | | — |
| 2010 | 334 | | −31.8% |
| 2020 | 267 | | −20.1% |
U.S. Decennial Census

== School districts ==
- Tri Point Community Unit School District 6-J

== Political districts ==
- Illinois' 15th congressional district
- State House District 105
- State Senate District 53
