= Wall Township, Illinois =

Township in Illinois, US

Wall Township
- Township
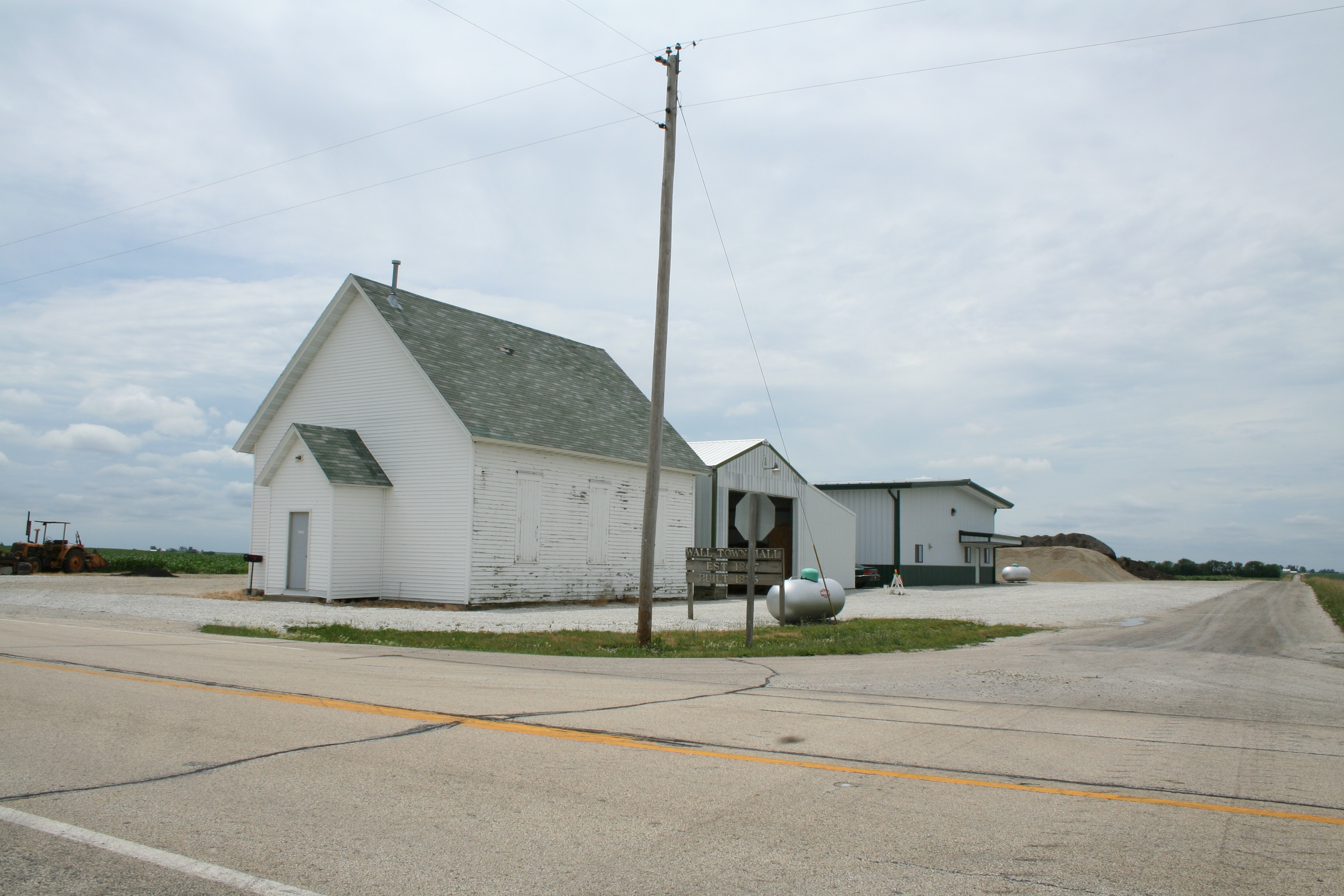
- Wall Township government building

- Location in Ford County

- Ford County's location in Illinois
- Coordinates: 40°31′25″N 88°10′56″W
- Country: United States
- State: Illinois
- County: Ford
- Established: June 12, 1867

Area
  - Total: 36.72 sq mi (95.1 km^{2})
  - Land: 36.68 sq mi (95.0 km^{2})
  - Water: 0.04 sq mi (0.10 km^{2}) 0.12%
- Elevation: 771 ft (235 m)

Population (2020)
  - Total: 190
  - Density: 5.2/sq mi (2.0/km^{2})
- Time zone: UTC-6 (CST)
  - Summer (DST): UTC-5 (CDT)
- ZIP codes: 60948, 60952, 60957
- FIPS code: 17-053-78474

Wall Township is one of twelve townships in Ford County, Illinois, USA. As of the 2020 census, its population was 190 and it contained 78 housing units. The township was formed from Patton Township on June 12, 1867.

== Geography ==
According to the 2021 census gazetteer files, Wall Township has a total area of 36.72 square miles (95.10 km^{2}), of which 36.67 square miles (94.97 km^{2}) (or 99.88%) is land and 0.04 square miles (0.10 km^{2}) (or 0.12%) is water.

=== Airports and landing strips ===
- Beherns Airport

== Demographics ==
As of the 2020 census there were 190 people, 77 households, and 49 families residing in the township. The population density was 5.17 inhabitants per square mile (2.00/km^{2}). There were 78 housing units at an average density of 2.12 per square mile (0.82/km^{2}). The racial makeup of the township was 98.95% White, 0.00% African American, 0.00% Native American, 0.00% Asian, 0.00% Pacific Islander, 0.00% from other races, and 1.05% from two or more races. Hispanic or Latino of any race were 0.00% of the population.

There were 77 households, out of which 5.20% had children under the age of 18 living with them, 63.64% were married couples living together, 0.00% had a female householder with no spouse present, and 36.36% were non-families. 20.80% of all households were made up of individuals, and 20.80% had someone living alone who was 65 years of age or older. The average household size was 1.83 and the average family size was 2.14.

The township's age distribution consisted of 2.8% under the age of 18, 4.3% from 18 to 24, 12.8% from 25 to 44, 58.2% from 45 to 64, and 22.0% who were 65 years of age or older. The median age was 58.2 years. For every 100 females, there were 65.9 males. For every 100 females age 18 and over, there were 61.2 males.

The median income for a household in the township was $44,583, and the median income for a family was $63,750. Males had a median income of $38,750 versus $28,750 for females. The per capita income for the township was $34,433. About 0.0% of families and 0.0% of the population were below the poverty line, including 0.0% of those under age 18 and 0.0% of those age 65 or over.

Historical population
Census	Pop.	Note	%±
2000	218		—
2010	209		−4.1%
2020	190		−9.1%
2016 (est.)	200		−4.3%
U.S. Decennial Census

== School districts ==
- Gibson City-Melvin-Sibley Community Unit School District 5
- Paxton-Buckley-Loda Community Unit School District 10

== Political districts ==
- Illinois' 15th congressional district
- State House District 105
- State Senate District 53
