= Clarence, Illinois =

Clarence
- Unincorporated
- Location of Clarence within Illinois Clarence (the United States)
- Coordinates: 40°27′50″N 87°58′15″W
- Country: United States
- State: Illinois
- County: Ford
- Township: Button
- Elevation: 761 ft (232 m)

Population (2000)
  - Total: <100
- Time zone: UTC-6 (CST)
  - Summer (DST): UTC-5 (CDT)
- Zip: 60925
- GNIS ID: 406143

Clarence is an unincorporated community in Ford County, Illinois, United States. Clarence is within the limits of the remote Button Township and makes up most of its population. The community is located adjacent to Illinois Route 9, which provides service to nearby Paxton and Rankin.
