= Guthrie, Illinois =

Guthrie
- Unincorporated
- Location of Guthrie within Illinois Guthrie (the United States)
- Coordinates: 40°30′30″N 88°19′30″W
- Country: United States
- State: Illinois
- County: Ford
- Township: Dix
- Elevation: 807 ft (246 m)
- Time zone: UTC-6 (CST)
  - Summer (DST): UTC-5 (CDT)
- GNIS ID: 409581

Guthrie is an unincorporated community in Dix Township, Ford County, Illinois, United States. It is situated along Illinois Route 54, between Melvin and Gibson City.

== History ==
Guthrie was established about 1876 as an Illinois Central Railroad station, and was named after a director of the railroad. The station closed in 1932. The Guthrie Post Office was established on May 22, 1876, and closed on September 30, 1952. Guthrie was platted in 1892.
