= Lloyd P. Young =

American college president (1898–1988)

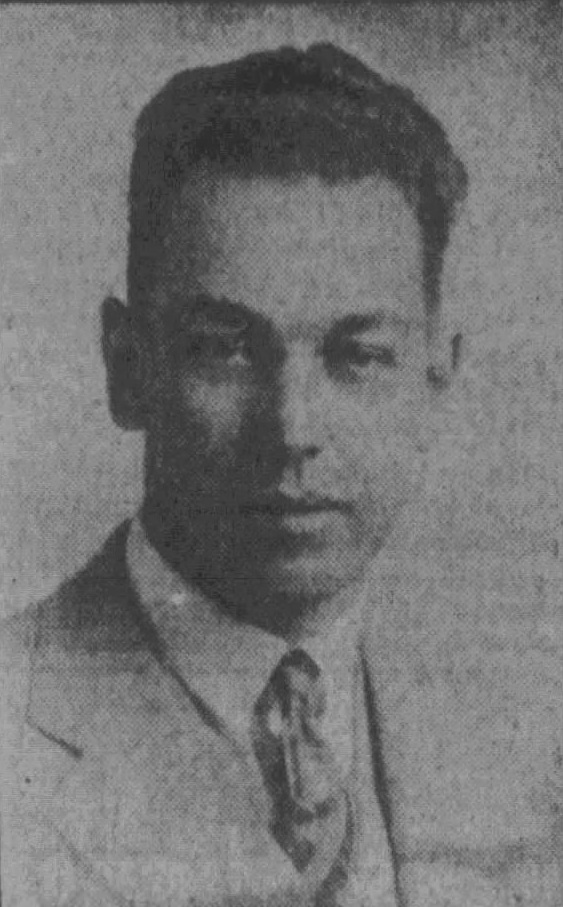
- Lloyd P. Young, c. 1930
- Born: 1898; Roberts, Illinois, US
- Died: November 8, 1988 (aged 89–90); Sharon, New Hampshire, US
- Occupation: College president

Academic background
- Education: Kansas State Normal School, B.S. 1922; Teachers College, Columbia University. M.S. 1929, Ph.D 1931
- Thesis: Administration of Merit Type Teachers' Salary Schedules (1931)

Academic work
- Discipline: Education
- Institutions: Keene Teachers College

Lloyd P. Young (1898 – November 8, 1988) was an American academic administrator. He was president of what is now Keene State College in Keene, New Hampshire for 25 years. He transformed a small normal school into an accredited liberal arts college that became part of the University of New Hampshire system.

== Early life ==
Young was born in 1898 in Roberts, Illinois. He was the oldest of five children of William Young. The family moved to Welcome, Minnesota, where Young attended a rural school. In 1913, the family moved to Moran, Kansas, where Young graduated from high school.

To earn money for college, Young worked as an oil field driller and in an oil refinery for four years. He was drafted for World War I on September 1918. He was sent to the Student Army Training Corps at Kansas State Normal School in Emporia, Kansas. When he mustered out of the army on February 1, 1919, he decided to stay and attend college.

Young graduated with a B.S. from the Kansas State Normal School in 1922. While there, he lettered in football and was the manager of the campus newspapers, the yearbook editor, and a glee club member. He was also a member of Sigma Tau Gamma.

Young earned a Master's degree from the Teachers College, Columbia University in New York City in 1929, followed by a Ph.D. June 1931. His dissertation was Administration of Merit Type Teachers' Salary Schedules. He was able to work on his Ph.D. by earning a scholarship and working as an assistant to Dr. Cater Alexander of the Education Department. At Columbia he was a member of Kappa Delta Pi and PDK International education honor societies.

== Career ==
After graduating from the normal school in 1922, Young taught at Liberal, Kansas for one year. He was a high school teacher in Elmdale, Kansas in 1923, becoming its principal in 1925. He left Elmdale in 1928 to work on his doctorate. In August 1930, he became the research director of public schools at Holyoke, Massachusetts, helping with a survey of the school system and its buildings.

In April 1932, he was elected superintendent of the public schools in Berlin, New Hampshire. In the summer, he taught at colleges in New Hampshire. In the summer of 1937, he taught at Keene Normal School in Keene, New Hampshire.

In March 1938, Young was selected to be the next president of Keene Normal School starting on July 1, 1938. Under his leadership, enrollment grew from 300 to 1,200 students, and the college was accredited by the New England Association of Colleges and Secondary Schools. During his academic career, Young was president of the Eastern States Association of Colleges of Teacher Education, the New England Teacher Preparation Association, and the New Hampshire Education Association. He was also a member of the American Association of School Administration and the American Association of Colleges for Teacher Education. Young served as president for 25 years, retiring from Keene Teachers College on June 30, 1964.

In 1960, Young was an educational consultant in Tanganyika Territory in Africa on behalf of the United States. Through the United States Agency for International Development and Teachers College, Columbia University, Young was an advisor to the Minister of Education of Peru from 1964 to 1968. He worked as a teacher training consultant, helping to modernize Peru's education system.

== Honors ==
Young was an honorary member of the Alpha Phi Omega service fraternity. He received an honorary Doctor of Laws degree from the University of New Hampshire in June 1964. In 1969, the L. P. Young Student Center at Keene State College was named in his honor.

The University of New Hampshire board of trustees named Young president emeritus in March 1970; he was the first to receive this honor in the University of New Hampshire System's 85-year history.

== Personal life ==
In 1924, Young married Dorothy Mirth, a schoolteacher who graduated from Kansas State Normal School. She enrolled at Columbia University with her husband and also received a Master's degree in 1929. The couple had two sons: Kenton and Maxfield.

Young was a member and director of the Holyoke Rotary and volunteered with the Boy Scouts in Holyoke. He was president of the Kiwanis of Berlin, New Hampshire. In his retirement, Young and his wife lived in Sharon, New Hampshire and Petersborough, New Hamshire. He was active in Dollars for Scholars, the Monadnock Camera Club, the New Hampshire Weaver's Guild, the Peterborough Historical Society, and the Weaver's Guild of Boston. He was also president of the Sharon Arts Center and the Keene Endowment Association.

Young died at the age of 89 on November 8, 1988, in his home in Sharon.
