= Ford County Courthouse (Illinois) =

Local government building in the United States

Coordinates: 40°27′47″N 88°05′57″W

The Ford County Courthouse, located at 200 West State Street in Paxton, Illinois, is the county courthouse serving Ford County, Illinois. Built in 1905–1906, it is a building of modified Second Empire architecture.

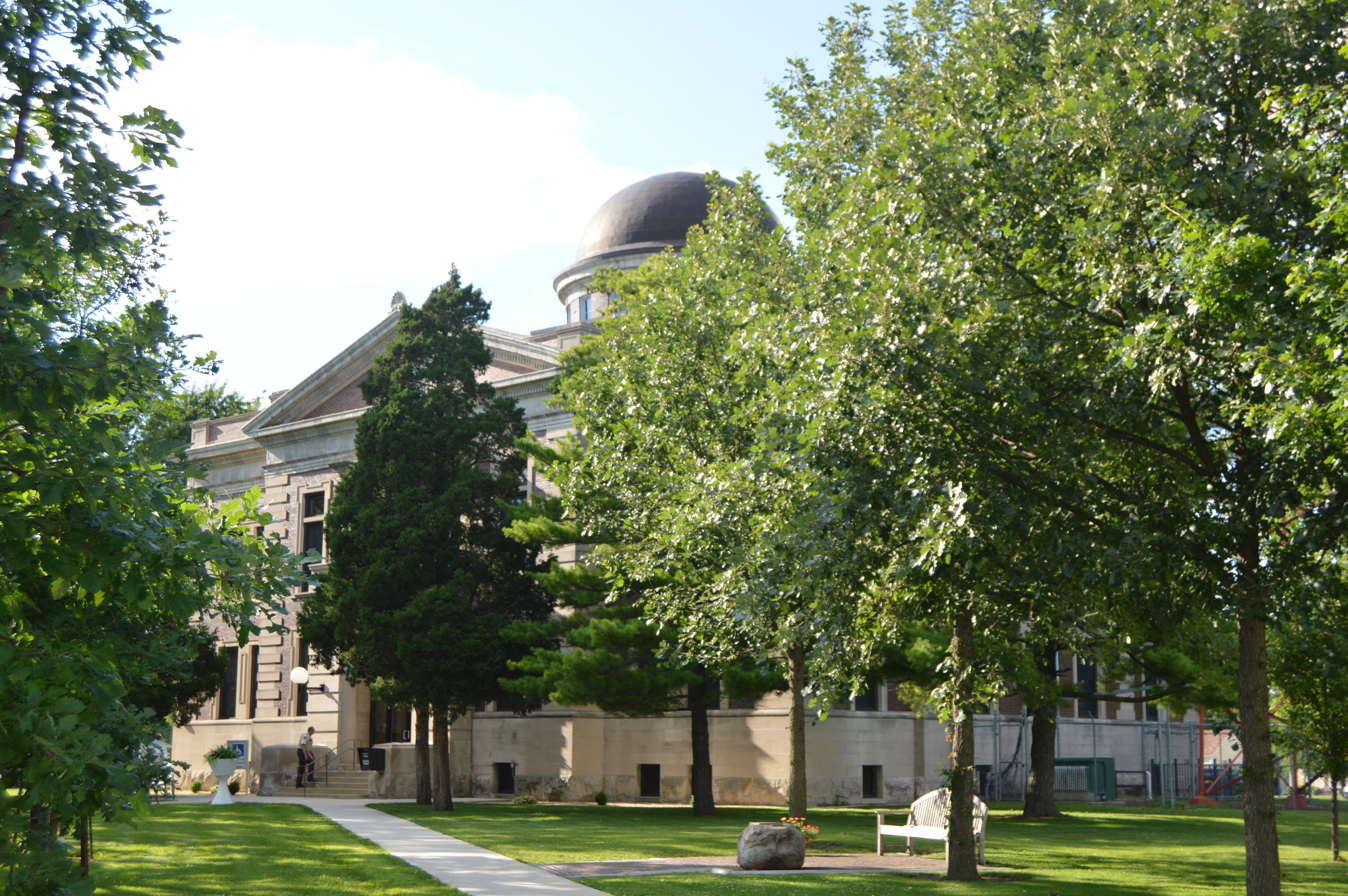
Ford County Courthouse

== Description ==
The Ford County Courthouse holds court sessions on cases brought to it within its 11th Circuit jurisdiction. It is also the meeting place of the elected county board, and contains offices for the county. The 1905–1906 county courthouse is the second building to serve this purpose. The first courthouse operated in 1862–1906.
