= Pontoosuc Township, Hancock County, Illinois =

Pontoosuc Township
- Township
- Township buildings

- Location in Hancock County

- Hancock County's location in Illinois
- Coordinates: 40°35′47″N 91°13′22″W
- Country: United States
- State: Illinois
- County: Hancock
- Established: November 6, 1849

Area
  - Total: 19.87 sq mi (51.5 km^{2})
  - Land: 18.47 sq mi (47.8 km^{2})
  - Water: 1.40 sq mi (3.6 km^{2}) 7.04%
- Elevation: 636 ft (194 m)

Population (2020)
  - Total: 365
  - Density: 19.8/sq mi (7.63/km^{2})
- Time zone: UTC-6 (CST)
  - Summer (DST): UTC-5 (CDT)
- ZIP codes: 62330, 62358
- FIPS code: 17-067-61093

Pontoosuc Township is one of twenty-four townships in Hancock County, Illinois, USA. As of the 2020 census, its population was 365 and it contained 218 housing units.

== Geography ==
According to the 2021 census gazetteer files, Pontoosuc Township has a total area of 19.87 square miles (51.46 km^{2}), of which 18.47 square miles (47.84 km^{2}) (or 92.96%) is land and 1.40 square miles (3.63 km^{2}) (or 7.04%) is water.

=== Cities, towns, villages ===
- Dallas City (partial)
- Pontoosuc

=== Cemeteries ===
The township contains these four cemeteries: Little Family, Myers, Pontoosuc and Tull.

=== Major highways ===
- Illinois Route 9

=== Airports and landing strips ===
- Rhea RLA Airport

== Demographics ==
Historical population
Census	Pop.	Note	%±
1860	1,532		—
1870	1,946		27.0%
1880	789		−59.5%
1890	742		−6.0%
1900	791		6.6%
1910	715		−9.6%
1920	533		−25.5%
1930	459		−13.9%
1940	466		1.5%
1950	478		2.6%
1960	438		−8.4%
1970	428		−2.3%
1980	556		29.9%
1990	473		−14.9%
2000	423		−10.6%
2010	413		−2.4%
2020	365		−11.6%
U.S. Decennial Census

As of the 2020 census there were 365 people, 120 households, and 74 families residing in the township. The population density was 18.37 inhabitants per square mile (7.09/km^{2}). There were 218 housing units at an average density of 10.97 per square mile (4.24/km^{2}). The racial makeup of the township was 96.99% White, 0.27% African American, 0.27% Native American, 0.00% Asian, 0.00% Pacific Islander, 0.27% from other races, and 2.19% from two or more races. Hispanic or Latino of any race were 1.37% of the population.

There were 120 households, out of which 35.80% had children under the age of 18 living with them, 55.83% were married couples living together, 5.83% had a female householder with no spouse present, and 38.33% were non-families. 35.80% of all households were made up of individuals, and 24.20% had someone living alone who was 65 years of age or older. The average household size was 2.80 and the average family size was 3.82.

The township's age distribution consisted of 38.7% under the age of 18, 4.2% from 18 to 24, 24.8% from 25 to 44, 8.7% from 45 to 64, and 23.8% who were 65 years of age or older. The median age was 33.0 years. For every 100 females, there were 189.7 males. For every 100 females age 18 and over, there were 102.0 males.

The median income for a household in the township was $46,667, and the median income for a family was $46,111. Males had a median income of $27,188 versus $28,750 for females. The per capita income for the township was $23,185. About 36.5% of families and 42.3% of the population were below the poverty line, including 72.3% of those under age 18 and 2.5% of those age 65 or over.

== School districts ==
The following school districts take portions of the township:

- Dallas Elementary School District 327 and Illini West High School District 307
- Nauvoo-Colusa Community Unit School District 325

== Political districts ==
- Illinois's 18th congressional district
- State House District 94
- State Senate District 47
