= John T. McNaughton Bridge =

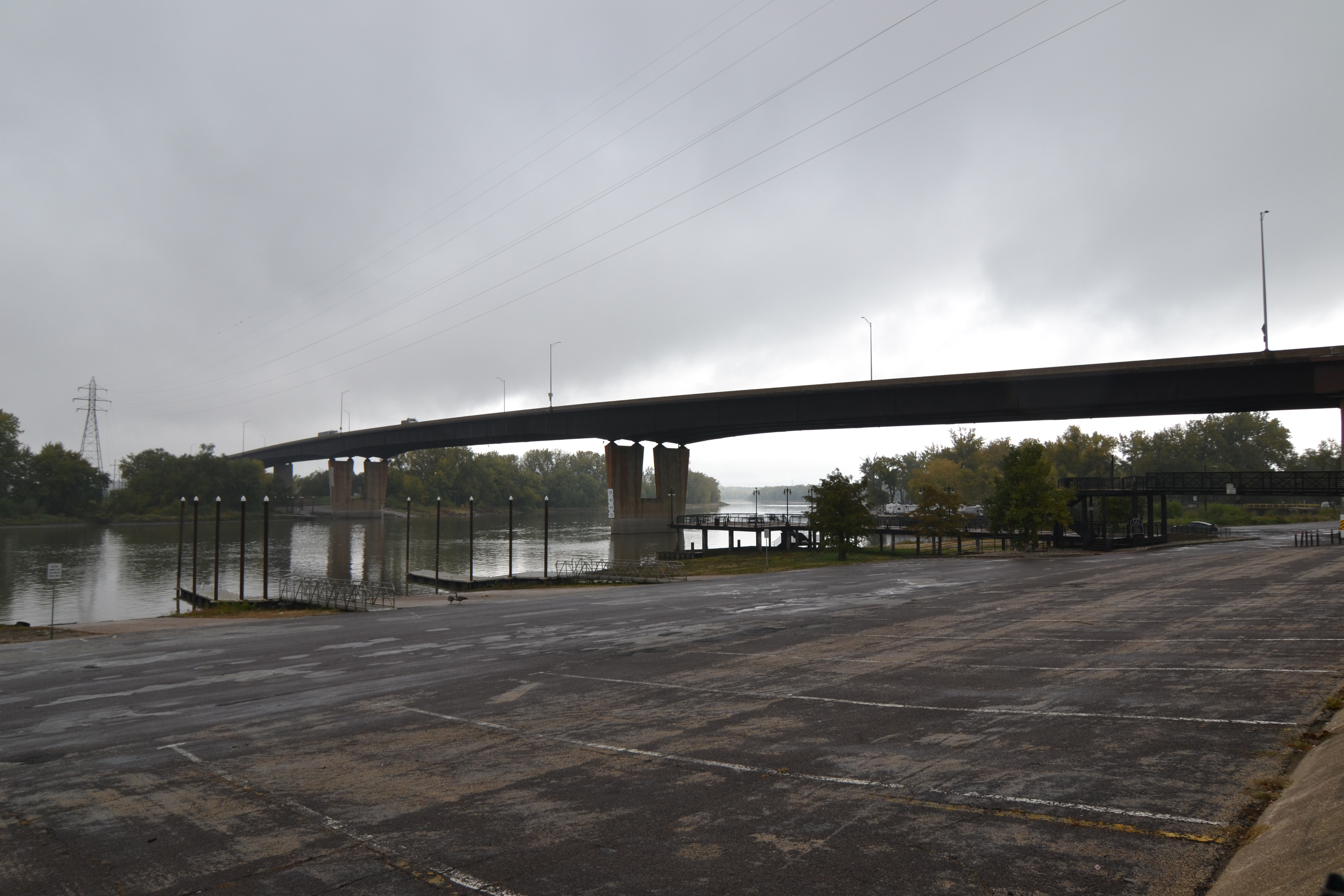
- View from Pekin Pier
- Coordinates: 40°34′35″N 89°39′34″W
- Carries: Illinois Route 9 - 4 lanes
- Crosses: Illinois River
- Locale: Pekin, Illinois
- Other name(s): Pekin Bridge
- Maintained by: Illinois Department of Transportation
- ID number: 000090011405432

Characteristics
- Design: Girder bridge
- Total length: 2,634 feet (803 m)
- Width: 78 feet (24 m)
- Longest span: 550 feet (170 m)
- Clearance below: 75 feet (23 m)

History
- Opened: 1982

Statistics
- Daily traffic: 13,900 (2005)

The John T. McNaughton Bridge, also known as the Pekin Bridge, is a steel girder bridge that carries Illinois Route 9 over the Illinois River from downtown Pekin to Peoria County in central Illinois. The John T. McNaughton Bridge was built in 1982 to replace a steel truss with a movable span. The bridge was constructed with a 75 foot clearance in order to allow river navigation, and it has a length of 2,634 feet.

The bridge is named for John T. McNaughton, who was United States Assistant Secretary of Defense for International Security Affairs and Robert S. McNamara's closest adviser during the Vietnam War. McNaughton was also a Harvard Law School professor. He died in a plane crash at age 45, less than two weeks before he would have become Secretary of the Navy.
