= Illinois Route 115 =

State highway in northeastern Illinois, US

Illinois Route 115
- IL 115 highlighted in red

Route information
- Maintained by IDOT
- Length: 63.37 mi (101.98 km)
- Existed: 1924–present

Major junctions
- South end: IL 9 in Elliott
- US 24 in Piper City
- North end: US 45 / US 52 in Kankakee

Location
- Country: United States
- State: Illinois
- Counties: Ford, Kankakee

Highway system
- Illinois State Highway System; Interstate; US; State; Tollways; Scenic
← IL 114	→ IL 116

Illinois Route 115 is a minor north–south state route in northeastern Illinois. It runs from Illinois Route 9 near Perdueville to the concurrent U.S. Routes 45/52 in Kankakee. This is a distance of 63.37 miles (101.98 km).

== Route description ==
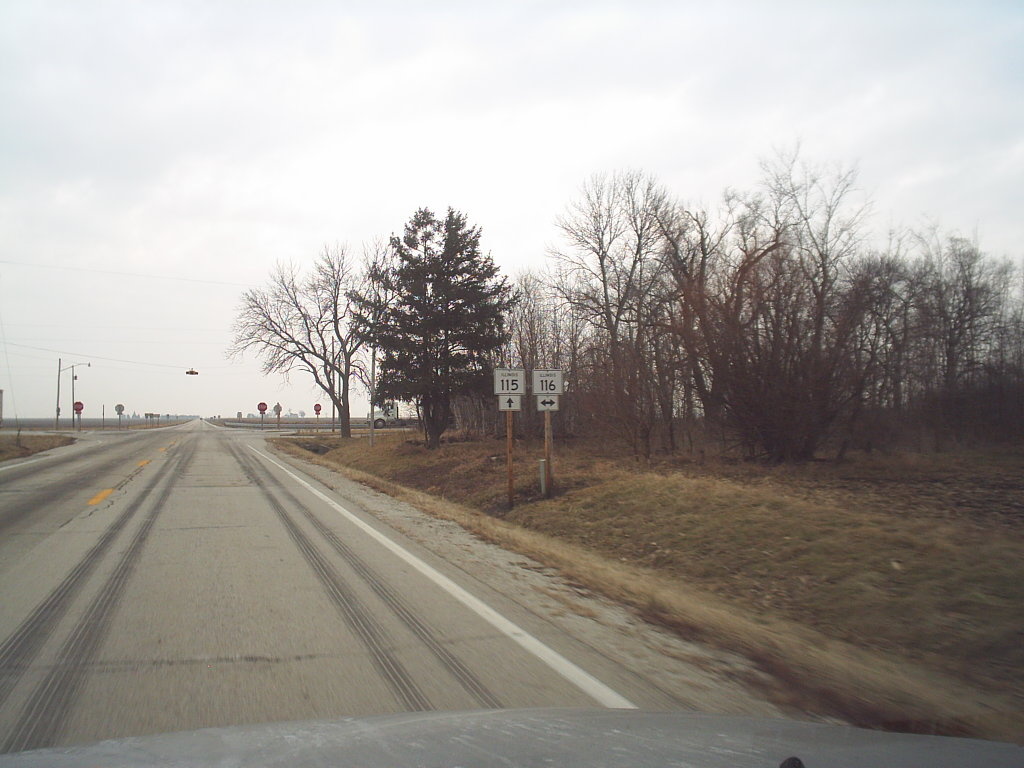
IL 115 at the intersection with IL 116

Illinois 115 is a north–south highway from Perdueville to Buckingham; at Buckingham, it turns east but is still marked north–south. South of Kankakee, Illinois 115 turns north again on its way into Kankakee.

Illinois 115 is an undivided two-lane surface state route for its entire length.

== History ==
SBI Route 115 ran from near Kankakee to Perdueville along what is Illinois 115 now. In 1954, when U.S. 45 was moved onto a new road, Illinois 115 was extended north into Kankakee onto old U.S. 45.

== Major Intersections ==
County	Location	mi	km	Destinations	Notes
Ford		0.0	0.0	IL 9 – Gibson City, Paxton	
Ford	Roberts	10.6	17.1	IL 54 west – Gibson City	Southern end of IL 54 concurrency
Ford	Roberts	11.0	17.7	IL 54 east – Onarga	Northern end of IL 54 concurrency
Ford	Piper City	20.1	32.3	US 24 east – Gilman	Southern end of US 24 concurrency
Ford	Piper City	20.4	32.8	US 24 west	Northern end of US 24 concurrency
Ford		30.1	48.4	IL 116 – Pontiac, Ashkum	
Kankakee	Buckingham	44.0	70.8	CR 18 north	
Kankakee	Herscher	50.1	80.6	CR 51 (Park Road)	
Kankakee	Otto Township	54.9	88.4	CR 28	
Kankakee	Kankakee	59.9	96.4	CR 58 south	
Kankakee	Kankakee	63.37	101.98	US 45 / US 52	
1.000 mi = 1.609 km; 1.000 km = 0.621 mi: Concurrency terminus
