= Bellflower Township, McLean County, Illinois =

Coordinates: 40°20′26″N 88°31′05″W

Bellflower Township
- Township
- Location in McLean County

- McLean County's location in Illinois
- Country: United States
- State: Illinois
- County: McLean
- Established: May 17, 1858

Area
  - Total: 48.7 sq mi (126 km^{2})
  - Land: 48.7 sq mi (126 km^{2})
  - Water: 0 sq mi (0 km^{2}) 0%

Population (2010)
  - Estimate (2016): 568
  - Density: 12/sq mi (4.6/km^{2})
- Time zone: UTC-6 (CST)
  - Summer (DST): UTC-5 (CDT)
- FIPS code: 17-113-04910

Bellflower Township is located in McLean County, Illinois. As of the 2010 census, its population was 585 and it contained 267 housing units. Bellflower Township changed its name from Prairie Township on May 17, 1858.

== Geography ==
According to the 2010 census, the township has a total area of 48.7 square miles (126 km^{2}), all land.

== Demographics ==
Historical population
Census	Pop.	Note	%±
2016 (est.)	568
U.S. Decennial Census

=== 2020 Census ===
As of the 2020 United States Census, Bellflower Township had a population of 541. The median age is 42.9. 20.5% of the population is 18 years of age or younger and 22.4% is of 65 years of age or older. 52.5% of the population is male and 47.5% is female. While for the population 18 years of age or older, 53.7% were male and 46.3% were female.

Bellflower Township had 227 households, of which 14.5% had children under 18. 54.6% of households were married couple households, 5.7% were cohabiting couple households, 26% had a male householder with no spouse or partner present, and 13.7% had a female householder with no spouse or partner present. 39.7% of households were individuals living alone and 3.5% of householders were individuals over 65 years or older living alone.

Out of 245 housing units, 7.9% were vacant. Homeowner vacancy was 1.8% while rental vacancy was 8.2%.

Racial composition as of the 2020 census
Race	Count	Percent
White	514	95%
Black or African American	1	0.2%
American Indian and Alaska Native	2	0.4%
Asian	2	0.4%
Two or More Races	22	4%
Hispanic or Latino (of any race)	4	0.7%
