= Ford County, Illinois =

County in Illinois, United States

- County
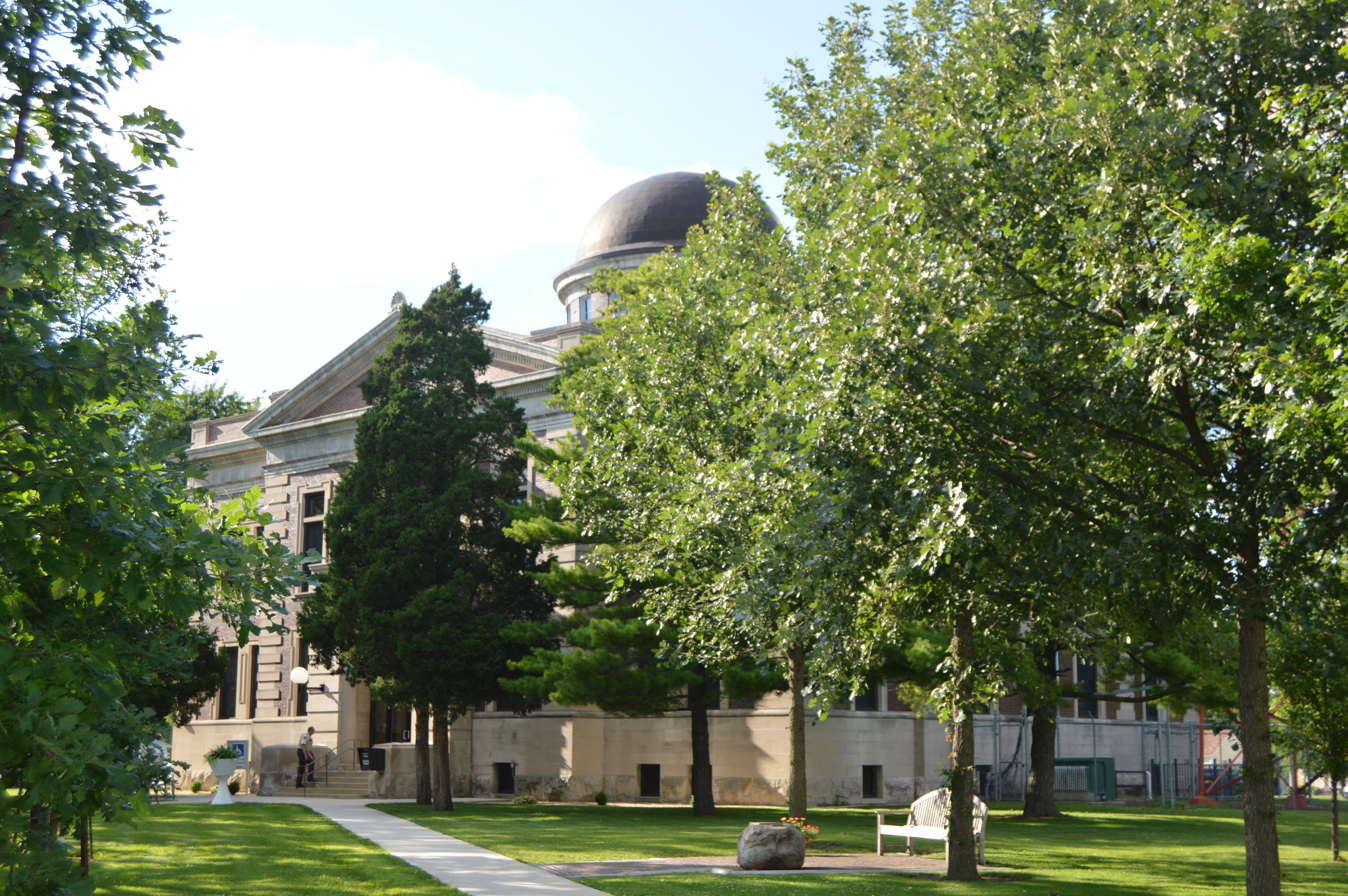
- Ford County Courthouse in Paxton

- Location within the U.S. state of Illinois
- Coordinates: 40°35′N 88°13′W
- Country: United States
- State: Illinois
- Founded: February 17, 1859
- Named for: Thomas Ford
- Seat: Paxton
- Largest city: Paxton

Area
  - Total: 486 sq mi (1,260 km^{2})
  - Land: 486 sq mi (1,260 km^{2})
  - Water: 0.6 sq mi (1.6 km^{2}) 0.1%

Population (2020)
  - Total: 13,534
  - Estimate (2025): 13,216 ▼
  - Density: 27.8/sq mi (10.8/km^{2})
- Time zone: UTC−6 (Central)
  - Summer (DST): UTC−5 (CDT)
- Congressional districts: 2nd, 16th
- Website: fordcounty.illinois.gov

Ford County is a county located in the U.S. state of Illinois. According to the 2020 United States census, it had a population of 13,534. Its county seat is Paxton. Ford County was part of the Champaign-Urbana Metropolitan Area until 2018, when the Office of Management and Budget removed the county from the area.

== History ==
Ford County was formed February 17, 1859, making it Illinois's "newest" county. It was created at the behest of some residents of Vermilion County, who complained to the General Assembly that they lived too far from the county seat. Ford County was named after Thomas Ford, the Governor of Illinois from 1842 to 1846.

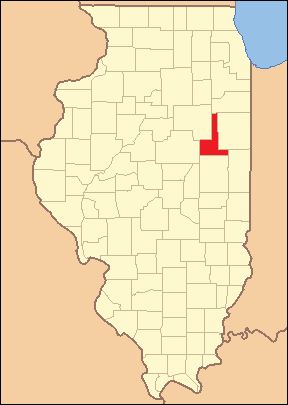
The creation of Douglas and Ford Counties in 1859 resulted in Illinois's current county map.

== Geography ==
According to the US Census Bureau, the county has a total area of 486 square miles (1,260 km^{2}), of which 486 square miles (1,260 km^{2}) is land and 0.6 square miles (1.6 km^{2}) (0.1%) is water.

=== Climate and weather ===
Paxton, Illinois

Climate chart (precipitation, max. and min. temperature)
J	F	M	A	M	J	J	A	S	O	N	D
1.7 30 14	1.4 35 19	3.2 48 29	3.4 61 39	4.4 72 50	3.5 82 59	3.8 85 62	3.3 83 60	3.2 77 53	3.3 65 41	3 49 31	3 35 20
- █ Average max. and min. temperatures in °F
- █ Precipitation totals in inches
- Source: The Weather Channel
Metric conversion
J	F	M	A	M	J	J	A	S	O	N	D
42 −1 −10	36 2 −7	81 9 −2	87 16 4	111 22 10	88 28 15	95 29 17	83 28 16	81 25 12	84 18 5	77 9 −1	77 2 −7
- █ Average max. and min. temperatures in °C
- █ Precipitation totals in mm

In recent years, average temperatures in the county seat of Paxton have ranged from a low of 14 °F (−10 °C) in January to a high of 85 °F (29 °C) in July, although a record low of −25 °F (−32 °C) was recorded in January 1999 and a record high of 102 °F (39 °C) was recorded in June 1988. Average monthly precipitation ranged from 1.40 inches (36 mm) in February to 4.38 inches (111 mm) in May.

=== Adjacent counties ===
- Kankakee County – north
- Iroquois County – east
- Vermilion County – southeast
- Champaign County – south
- McLean County – southwest
- Livingston County – west

=== Transit ===
- SHOW Bus

=== Major highways ===
- Interstate 57
- US Route 24
- US Route 45
- Illinois Route 9
- Illinois Route 47
- Illinois Route 54
- Illinois Route 115
- Illinois Route 116

== Demographics ==
Historical population
Census	Pop.	Note	%±
1860	1,979		—
1870	9,103		360.0%
1880	15,099		65.9%
1890	17,035		12.8%
1900	18,359		7.8%
1910	17,096		−6.9%
1920	16,466		−3.7%
1930	15,489		−5.9%
1940	15,007		−3.1%
1950	15,901		6.0%
1960	16,606		4.4%
1970	16,382		−1.3%
1980	15,265		−6.8%
1990	14,275		−6.5%
2000	14,241		−0.2%
2010	14,081		−1.1%
2020	13,534		−3.9%
2025 (est.)	13,216	▼	−2.3%
US Decennial Census; 1790-1960 1900-1990; 1990-2000 2010

2000 census age pyramid for Ford County

=== 2020 census ===
As of the 2020 census, the county had a population of 13,534. The median age was 42.9 years. 22.4% of residents were under the age of 18 and 21.2% of residents were 65 years of age or older. For every 100 females there were 98.1 males, and for every 100 females age 18 and over there were 95.0 males age 18 and over.

The racial makeup of the county was 92.0% White, 0.6% Black or African American, 0.2% American Indian and Alaska Native, 0.5% Asian, <0.1% Native Hawaiian and Pacific Islander, 1.6% from some other race, and 5.1% from two or more races. Hispanic or Latino residents of any race comprised 4.1% of the population.

33.5% of residents lived in urban areas, while 66.5% lived in rural areas.

There were 5,638 households in the county, of which 28.9% had children under the age of 18 living in them. Of all households, 49.3% were married-couple households, 18.8% were households with a male householder and no spouse or partner present, and 25.1% were households with a female householder and no spouse or partner present. About 31.3% of all households were made up of individuals and 14.6% had someone living alone who was 65 years of age or older.

There were 6,265 housing units, of which 10.0% were vacant. Among occupied housing units, 73.6% were owner-occupied and 26.4% were renter-occupied. The homeowner vacancy rate was 2.9% and the rental vacancy rate was 9.6%.

=== Racial and ethnic composition ===
Ford County, Illinois – Racial and ethnic composition Note: the US Census treats Hispanic/Latino as an ethnic category. This table excludes Latinos from the racial categories and assigns them to a separate category. Hispanics/Latinos may be of any race.
Race / Ethnicity (NH = Non-Hispanic)	Pop 1980	Pop 1990	Pop 2000	Pop 2010	Pop 2020	% 1980	% 1990	% 2000	% 2010	% 2020
White alone (NH)	15,069	14,096	13,885	13,520	12,265	98.72%	98.75%	97.50%	96.02%	90.62%
Black or African American alone (NH)	58	42	35	78	75	0.38%	0.29%	0.25%	0.55%	0.55%
Native American or Alaska Native alone (NH)	4	12	14	32	24	0.03%	0.08%	0.10%	0.23%	0.18%
Asian alone (NH)	32	40	46	36	57	0.21%	0.28%	0.32%	0.26%	0.42%
Native Hawaiian or Pacific Islander alone (NH)	x	x	0	0	0	x	x	0.00%	0.00%	0.00%
Other race alone (NH)	24	4	5	11	42	0.16%	0.03%	0.04%	0.08%	0.31%
Mixed race or Multiracial (NH)	x	x	80	110	517	x	x	0.56%	0.78%	3.82%
Hispanic or Latino (any race)	78	81	176	294	554	0.51%	0.57%	1.24%	2.09%	4.09%
Total	15,265	14,275	14,241	14,081	13,534	100.00%	100.00%	100.00%	100.00%	100.00%

=== 2010 census ===
As of the 2010 United States census, there were 14,081 people, 5,676 households, and 3,798 families living in the county. The population density was 29.0 inhabitants per square mile (11.2/km^{2}). There were 6,282 housing units at an average density of 12.9 per square mile (5.0/km^{2}). The racial makeup of the county was 97.1% white, 0.6% black or African American, 0.3% Asian, 0.2% American Indian, 0.6% from other races, and 1.1% from two or more races. Those of Hispanic or Latino origin made up 2.1% of the population. In terms of ancestry, 35.7% were German, 15.5% were Irish, 13.6% were American, and 10.4% were English.

Of the 5,676 households, 30.6% had children under the age of 18 living with them, 52.8% were married couples living together, 9.8% had a female householder with no husband present, 33.1% were non-families, and 29.2% of all households were made up of individuals. The average household size was 2.41 and the average family size was 2.95. The median age was 42.4 years.

The median income for a household in the county was $48,667 and the median income for a family was $62,819. Males had a median income of $43,849 versus $30,136 for females. The per capita income for the county was $23,401. About 5.4% of families and 8.3% of the population were below the poverty line, including 8.3% of those under age 18 and 8.8% of those age 65 or over.

== Communities ==
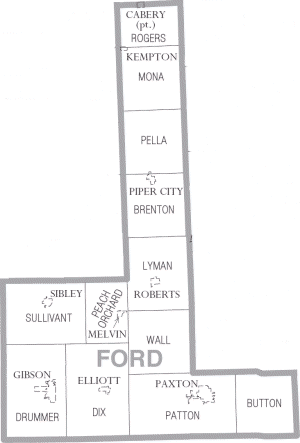
Map of Ford County

=== Cities ===
- Gibson City
- Paxton

=== Villages ===
- Cabery
- Elliott
- Kempton
- Melvin
- Piper City
- Roberts
- Sibley

=== Unincorporated communities ===
- Clarence
- Guthrie
- Perdueville
- Stelle

=== Extinct settlements ===
- Ten Mile Grove

=== Townships ===
- Brenton
- Button
- Dix
- Drummer
- Lyman
- Mona
- Patton
- Peach Orchard
- Pella
- Rogers
- Sullivant
- Wall

== Politics ==
Ford County is one of the state's most consistently Republican counties; since its 1859 organization it has voted for Republican presidential candidates in all but two elections. In 1912, the GOP was divided and Progressive Theodore Roosevelt carried the county over the more conservative official nominee William Howard Taft; in 1932, at the height of the Great Depression, Franklin D. Roosevelt in the first of his four campaigns became and has remained the only Democrat to carry Ford County. Since 1968 no Democratic presidential candidate has topped 36% of the county's vote, and since the county first formed only three Democrats – all in landslide national victories – have managed 40% of Ford County's votes.

After the Libertarian Party's success in the 1998 election for Ford County Sheriff and other countywide offices, it achieved established party status. At the time this made Ford County the only county in Illinois with three established parties. Due to its second place showing over the then-dormant Democratic Party in that election, the Libertarians received the minority party's seat on the Board of Review and one of the five seats on the Sheriff's Merit Commission. This status was lost by 2002 after the Libertarian Party failed to field any candidates in the 2002 general election.

President Gerald Ford visited Ford County on October 24, 1974, to mark the retirement of Congressman Leslie C. Arends of Melvin who served in Congress for 40 years, including over 30 years as Republican Minority Whip.

United States presidential election results for Ford County, Illinois
Year	Republican		Democratic		Third party(ies)	
Year	No.	%	No.	%	No.	%
1892	2,227	58.41%	1,359	35.64%	227	5.95%
1896	2,832	64.28%	1,507	34.20%	67	1.52%
1900	2,936	64.87%	1,469	32.46%	121	2.67%
1904	2,836	71.22%	926	23.25%	220	5.52%
1908	2,617	65.59%	1,164	29.17%	209	5.24%
1912	832	22.44%	1,035	27.91%	1,841	49.65%
1916	4,670	66.31%	2,054	29.16%	319	4.53%
1920	4,995	82.40%	958	15.80%	109	1.80%
1924	4,672	70.53%	1,093	16.50%	859	12.97%
1928	4,668	68.72%	2,098	30.88%	27	0.40%
1932	3,342	43.88%	4,175	54.82%	99	1.30%
1936	4,524	53.79%	3,715	44.17%	171	2.03%
1940	5,770	65.11%	3,062	34.55%	30	0.34%
1944	5,317	69.91%	2,270	29.85%	18	0.24%
1948	4,903	69.89%	2,079	29.64%	33	0.47%
1952	6,216	74.49%	2,121	25.42%	8	0.10%
1956	6,027	73.66%	2,152	26.30%	3	0.04%
1960	5,779	68.16%	2,698	31.82%	1	0.01%
1964	4,650	57.57%	3,427	42.43%	0	0.00%
1968	5,233	65.38%	2,216	27.69%	555	6.93%
1972	5,656	74.51%	1,934	25.48%	1	0.01%
1976	4,801	63.56%	2,690	35.61%	62	0.82%
1980	5,024	69.64%	1,803	24.99%	387	5.36%
1984	4,871	73.11%	1,763	26.46%	29	0.44%
1988	4,059	66.05%	2,026	32.97%	60	0.98%
1992	3,046	47.00%	2,175	33.56%	1,260	19.44%
1996	3,077	53.33%	2,065	35.79%	628	10.88%
2000	3,889	63.20%	2,090	33.97%	174	2.83%
2004	4,511	69.62%	1,912	29.51%	56	0.86%
2008	4,079	63.73%	2,227	34.80%	94	1.47%
2012	4,229	70.20%	1,656	27.49%	139	2.31%
2016	4,480	70.04%	1,414	22.11%	502	7.85%
2020	5,048	72.46%	1,754	25.18%	165	2.37%
2024	4,778	72.67%	1,643	24.99%	154	2.34%

== See also ==
- National Register of Historic Places listings in Ford County, Illinois
