= Roberts, Illinois =

Roberts
- Village
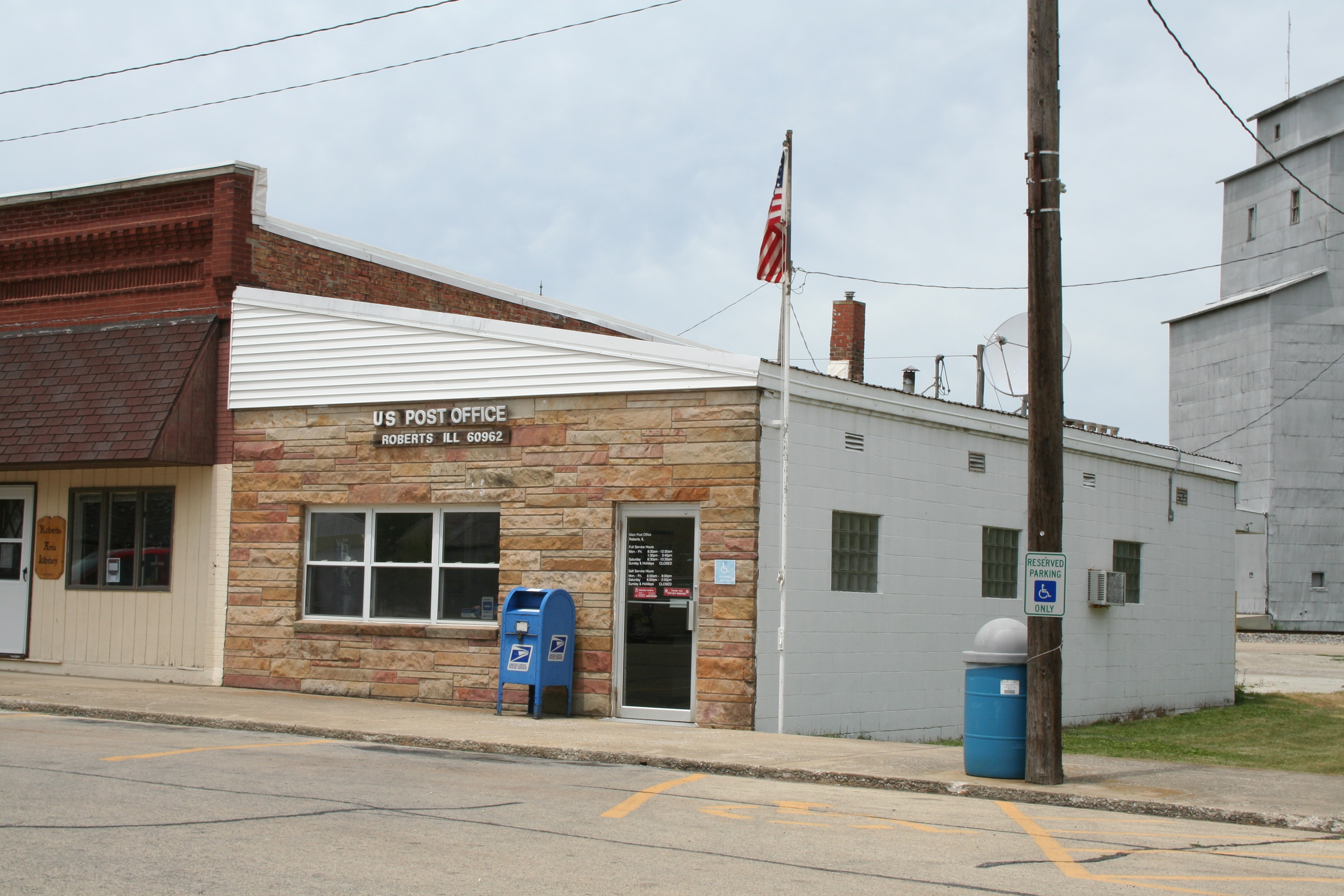
- Roberts Illinois Post Office.

- Location of Roberts in Ford County, Illinois.
- Coordinates: 40°36′53″N 88°11′03″W
- Country: United States
- State: Illinois
- County: Ford

Area
  - Total: 0.48 sq mi (1.25 km^{2})
  - Land: 0.48 sq mi (1.25 km^{2})
  - Water: 0 sq mi (0.00 km^{2})
- Elevation: 781 ft (238 m)

Population (2020)
  - Total: 345
  - Density: 716.9/sq mi (276.78/km^{2})
- Time zone: UTC-6 (CST)
  - Summer (DST): UTC-5 (CDT)
- ZIP code: 60962
- Area code: 217
- FIPS code: 17-64655
- GNIS feature ID: 2399097

Roberts is a village in Ford County, Illinois, United States. The population was 345 at the 2020 census.

== History ==
Roberts was named for the first permanent settlers in the area, Jesse and Livingston Roberts.

== Geography ==
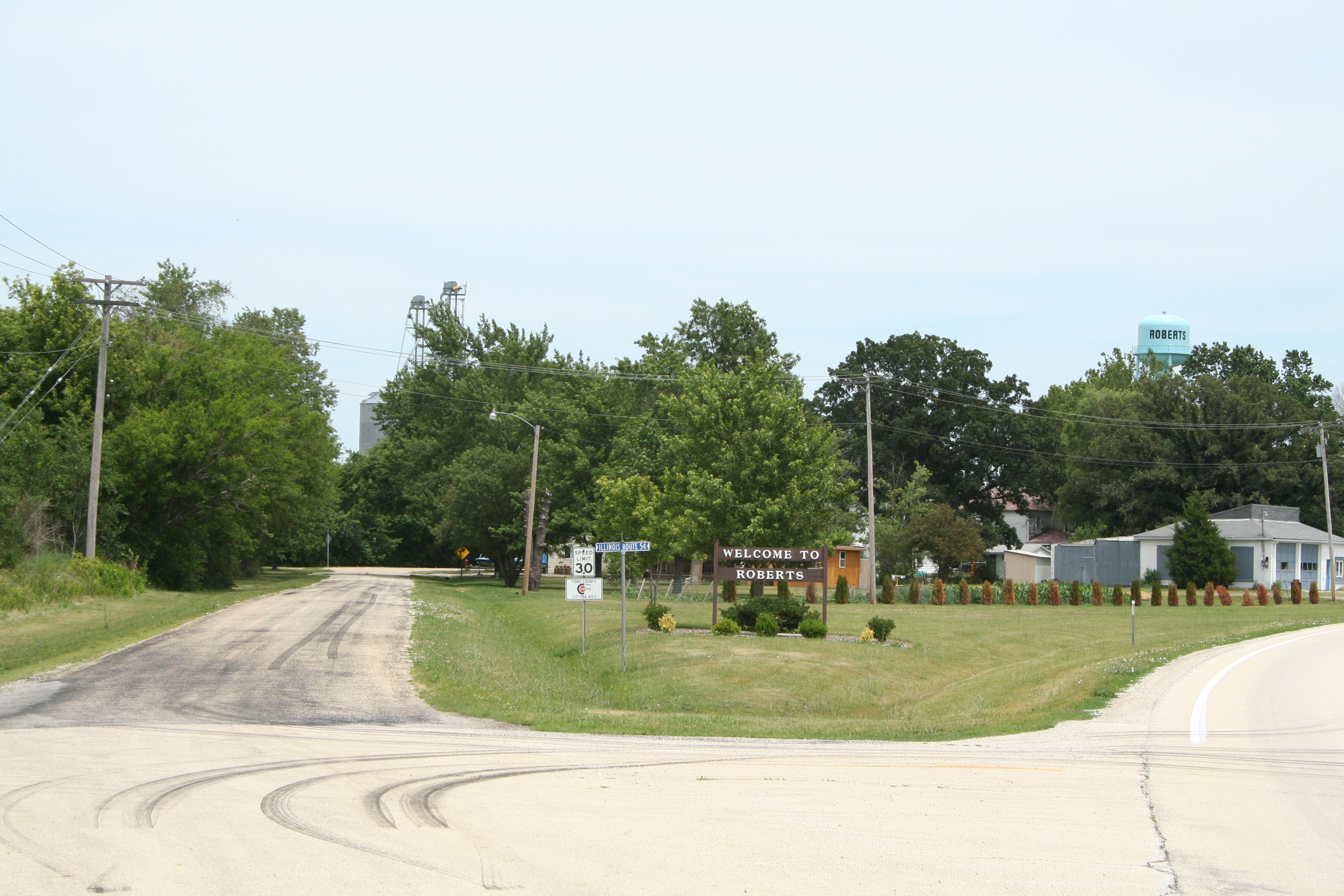
Roberts Illinois welcome sign, water tower and Illinois Route 54.

According to the 2021 census gazetteer files, Roberts has a total area of 0.48 square miles (1.24 km^{2}), all land.

== Demographics ==
Historical population
Census	Pop.	Note	%±
1880	228		—
1890	325		42.5%
1900	446		37.2%
1910	466		4.5%
1920	444		−4.7%
1930	410		−7.7%
1940	379		−7.6%
1950	416		9.8%
1960	504		21.2%
1970	506		0.4%
1980	422		−16.6%
1990	397		−5.9%
2000	387		−2.5%
2010	362		−6.5%
2020	345		−4.7%
U.S. Decennial Census

As of the 2020 census there were 345 people, 189 households, and 121 families residing in the village. The population density was 717.26 inhabitants per square mile (276.94/km^{2}). There were 182 housing units at an average density of 378.38 per square mile (146.09/km^{2}). The racial makeup of the village was 89.57% White, 0.58% African American, 0.58% Native American, 0.29% Asian, 0.00% Pacific Islander, 2.90% from other races, and 6.09% from two or more races. Hispanic or Latino of any race were 7.25% of the population.

There were 189 households, out of which 33.9% had children under the age of 18 living with them, 43.39% were married couples living together, 13.76% had a female householder with no husband present, and 35.98% were non-families. 31.75% of all households were made up of individuals, and 10.05% had someone living alone who was 65 years of age or older. The average household size was 3.07 and the average family size was 2.49.

The village's age distribution consisted of 28.7% under the age of 18, 11.3% from 18 to 24, 19.8% from 25 to 44, 32% from 45 to 64, and 8.3% who were 65 years of age or older. The median age was 40.3 years. For every 100 females, there were 92.6 males. For every 100 females age 18 and over, there were 97.1 males.

The median income for a household in the village was $36,250, and the median income for a family was $45,625. Males had a median income of $35,000 versus $20,417 for females. The per capita income for the village was $17,989. About 28.1% of families and 33.2% of the population were below the poverty line, including 48.5% of those under age 18 and 25.6% of those age 65 or over.

== Notable people ==
- Lloyd P. Young, president of what is now Keene State College
