= Piper City, Illinois =

Piper City
- Village
- Location of Piper City in Ford County, Illinois.
- Coordinates: 40°45′14″N 88°11′15″W
- Country: United States
- State: Illinois
- County: Ford

Area
  - Total: 0.56 sq mi (1.44 km^{2})
  - Land: 0.56 sq mi (1.44 km^{2})
  - Water: 0 sq mi (0.00 km^{2})
- Elevation: 669 ft (204 m)

Population (2020)
  - Total: 745
  - Density: 1,343.0/sq mi (518.52/km^{2})
- Time zone: UTC-6 (CST)
  - Summer (DST): UTC-5 (CDT)
- ZIP code: 60959
- Area code: 815
- FIPS code: 17-60079
- GNIS feature ID: 2399679
- Website: pipercity.com

Piper City is a village in Ford County, Illinois, United States. The population was 745 at the 2020 census.

== History ==
Piper City was laid out in 1867 by Samuel Cross of New York and William A. Piper (March 5, 1820 – July 6, 1896) of Philadelphia. The original plat was named Brenton. It was a station on the Toledo Peoria and Western Railroad, which had been completed ten years earlier. The present name of the town, which was adapted soon after the town was founded, comes from Piper who had extensive land holdings in the area. Cross lived briefly in the township, but little is known of his life. An earlier railroad siding and grain station known as Brenton had been established two miles to the east of the eventual location of the town. The new station was therefore briefly known as New Brenton. The Original Town lay on both sides of the railroad and the streets were aligned with the railroad, which was angled slightly away from true north–south. John Allen and W. C. Jones opened the first store in Piper City the summer of 1867. A second store called Piper, Montelius and Company was operated by J.A. Montelius, Piper's nephew, but it is unclear if Piper was actually a resident in the new town. The first Post Office was in the home of John R. Lewis, who had been a land agent for the Illinois Central Railroad. A Presbyterian Church was established in 1869, a Catholic church in 1880 and a Methodist church in 1881. In 1870, Montelius established a bank and was, for many years, the leading citizen of Piper City. In 1887, B.W. Kensey began the Piper City Journal. In 1924, when the people of Piper City learned that a new highway, soon to be known as U.S. 24, would pass a quarter mile south of the town, a delegation was sent to the governor to protest. They were unsuccessful. The town has been an important grain shipping point for the rich agricultural land of the pan handle of Ford County.

== Geography ==
According to the 2021 census gazetteer files, Piper City has a total area of 0.56 square miles (1.45 km^{2}), all land.

=== Climate ===
Climate data for Piper City, Illinois (1991–2020)
Month	Jan	Feb	Mar	Apr	May	Jun	Jul	Aug	Sep	Oct	Nov	Dec	Year
Mean daily maximum °F (°C)	35.0 (1.7)	40.1 (4.5)	51.7 (10.9)	65.2 (18.4)	76.0 (24.4)	85.0 (29.4)	87.6 (30.9)	85.3 (29.6)	80.4 (26.9)	67.8 (19.9)	52.6 (11.4)	40.2 (4.6)	63.9 (17.7)
Daily mean °F (°C)	25.3 (−3.7)	29.5 (−1.4)	39.8 (4.3)	51.6 (10.9)	62.6 (17.0)	72.5 (22.5)	75.3 (24.1)	72.8 (22.7)	66.3 (19.1)	54.8 (12.7)	41.6 (5.3)	30.8 (−0.7)	51.9 (11.1)
Mean daily minimum °F (°C)	15.6 (−9.1)	18.9 (−7.3)	27.9 (−2.3)	38.0 (3.3)	49.2 (9.6)	60.0 (15.6)	63.1 (17.3)	60.3 (15.7)	52.2 (11.2)	41.7 (5.4)	30.7 (−0.7)	21.5 (−5.8)	39.9 (4.4)
Average precipitation inches (mm)	3.40 (86)	2.75 (70)	2.97 (75)	4.02 (102)	4.91 (125)	4.53 (115)	4.90 (124)	4.14 (105)	2.86 (73)	3.68 (93)	3.22 (82)	3.01 (76)	44.39 (1,126)
Average snowfall inches (cm)	8.6 (22)	4.4 (11)	3.3 (8.4)	0.9 (2.3)	0.0 (0.0)	0.0 (0.0)	0.0 (0.0)	0.0 (0.0)	0.0 (0.0)	0.0 (0.0)	1.3 (3.3)	6.2 (16)	24.7 (63)
Source: NOAA

== Demographics ==
Historical population
Census	Pop.	Note	%±
1870	302		—
1880	423		40.1%
1890	460		8.7%
1900	577		25.4%
1910	663		14.9%
1920	715		7.8%
1930	650		−9.1%
1940	663		2.0%
1950	735		10.9%
1960	807		9.8%
1970	842		4.3%
1980	905		7.5%
1990	760		−16.0%
2000	781		2.8%
2010	826		5.8%
2020	745		−9.8%
U.S. Decennial Census

As of the 2020 census there were 745 people, 398 households, and 253 families residing in the village. The population density was 1,342.34 inhabitants per square mile (518.28/km^{2}). There were 357 housing units at an average density of 643.24 per square mile (248.36/km^{2}). The racial makeup of the village was 86.17% White, 0.13% African American, 0.27% Native American, 0.67% Asian, 0.00% Pacific Islander, 5.23% from other races, and 7.52% from two or more races. Hispanic or Latino of any race were 9.80% of the population.

There were 398 households, out of which 34.2% had children under the age of 18 living with them, 32.66% were married couples living together, 22.86% had a female householder with no husband present, and 36.43% were non-families. 31.66% of all households were made up of individuals, and 12.06% had someone living alone who was 65 years of age or older. The average household size was 2.44 and the average family size was 2.03.

The village's age distribution consisted of 17.8% under the age of 18, 13.3% from 18 to 24, 18.9% from 25 to 44, 33.9% from 45 to 64, and 16.3% who were 65 years of age or older. The median age was 45.0 years. For every 100 females, there were 93.9 males. For every 100 females age 18 and over, there were 89.5 males.

The median income for a household in the village was $36,310, and the median income for a family was $40,987. Males had a median income of $42,000 versus $25,341 for females. The per capita income for the village was $22,757. About 20.6% of families and 19.7% of the population were below the poverty line, including 40.8% of those under age 18 and 2.0% of those age 65 or over.

== Notable people ==
- Elmer Koestner, pitcher for the Cleveland Naps, Chicago Cubs and Cincinnati Reds; born in Piper City
