= Paxton-Buckley-Loda Community Unit School District 10 =

School district in Ford County, Illinois, United States

Address
- 700 West Orleans Street Paxton, Illinois, 60957; United States

District information
- Type: Public
- Grades: PreK–12
- NCES District ID: 1707650

Students and staff
- Students: 1,288 (2020–2021)

Other information
- Website: pblunit10.com

Paxton-Buckley-Loda Community Unit School District 10 is a unified school district centered in Paxton, the county seat of Ford County, Illinois. It is composed of four schools, or two elementary schools, a middle school, and one high school. Clara Peterson Elementary School services prekindergarteners, first graders, and second graders; Paxton-Buckley-Loda Eastlawn Elementary School builds on this by educating third graders, fourth graders, fifth graders. Paxton-Buckley Loda Junior High School bridges Eastlawn and the district high school by educating sixth through eighth graders, and graduates head to Paxton-Buckley-Loda High School to complete their precollegiate education. The mascot of the district schools is the panther. The district encompasses parts of Ford County, Livingston County, Iroquois County, Vermilion County, and Champaign County.

== History ==
Paxton-Buckley-Loda Community Unit School District 10 was formed out of the Paxton School District and Buckley-Loda School District; it was deemed necessary to combine the two due to fall in enrollment levels. By 1990, the fall of Buckley-Loda High School's enrollment to below the one hundred-student threshold set off the consolidation process. The school district grew again with the dissolution of Ford Central School District, which happened at around the time of the Paxton and Buckley-Loda school district.
