= Elliott, Illinois =

Elliott
- Village
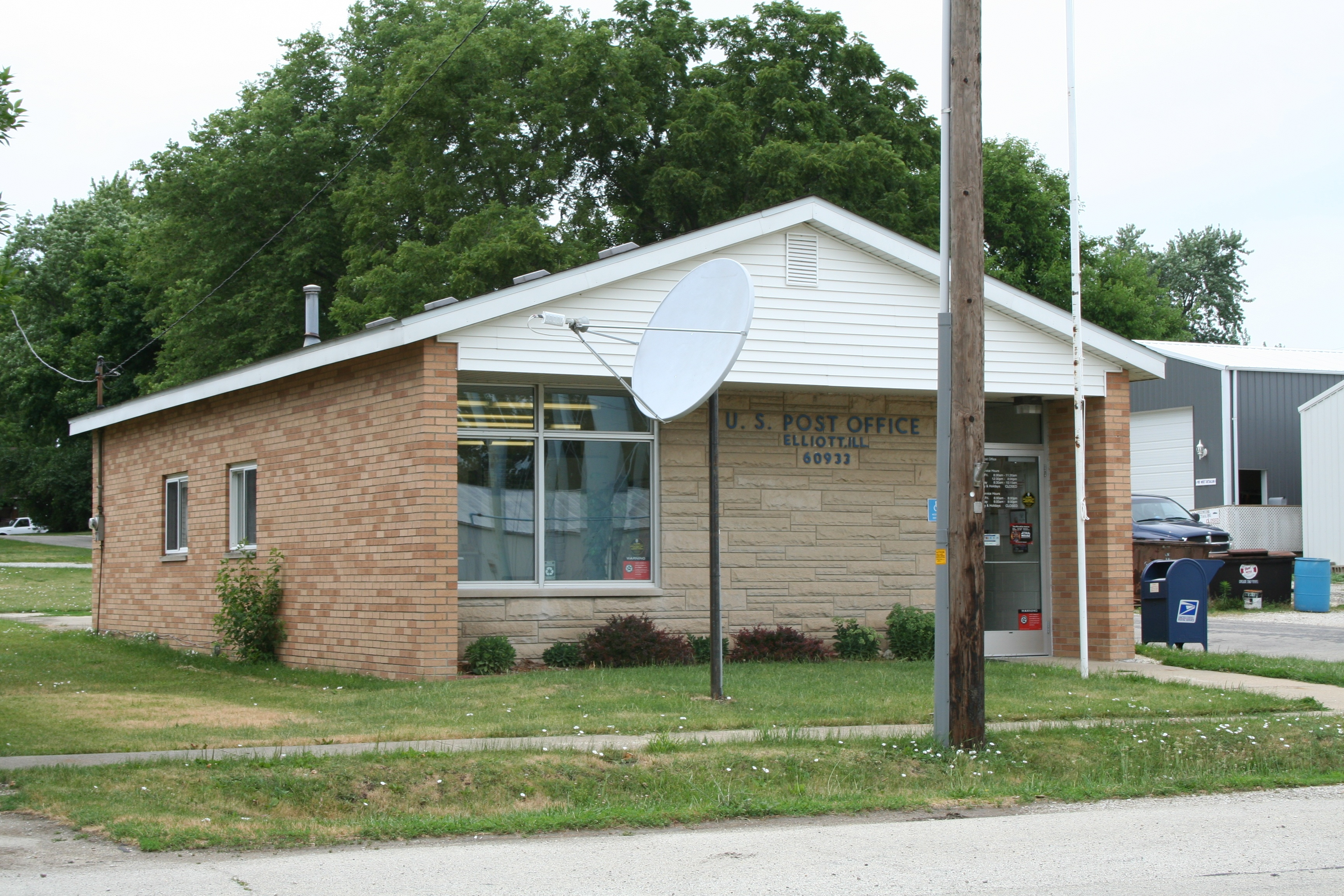
- Elliott Illinois Post Office.

- Location of Elliott in Ford County, Illinois.
- Coordinates: 40°27′58″N 88°16′37″W
- Country: United States
- State: Illinois
- County: Ford

Area
  - Total: 0.50 sq mi (1.29 km^{2})
  - Land: 0.50 sq mi (1.29 km^{2})
  - Water: 0 sq mi (0.00 km^{2})
- Elevation: 771 ft (235 m)

Population (2020)
  - Total: 274
  - Density: 550.7/sq mi (212.62/km^{2})
- Time zone: UTC-6 (CST)
  - Summer (DST): UTC-5 (CDT)
- ZIP code: 60933
- Area code: 217
- FIPS code: 17-23425
- GNIS feature ID: 2398808

Elliott is a village in Ford County, Illinois, United States. The population was 274 at the 2020 census.

== History ==
Elliott was named for the landowner of the village site, Samuel Elliott. The Elliott Post Office was established in 1871.

== Geography ==
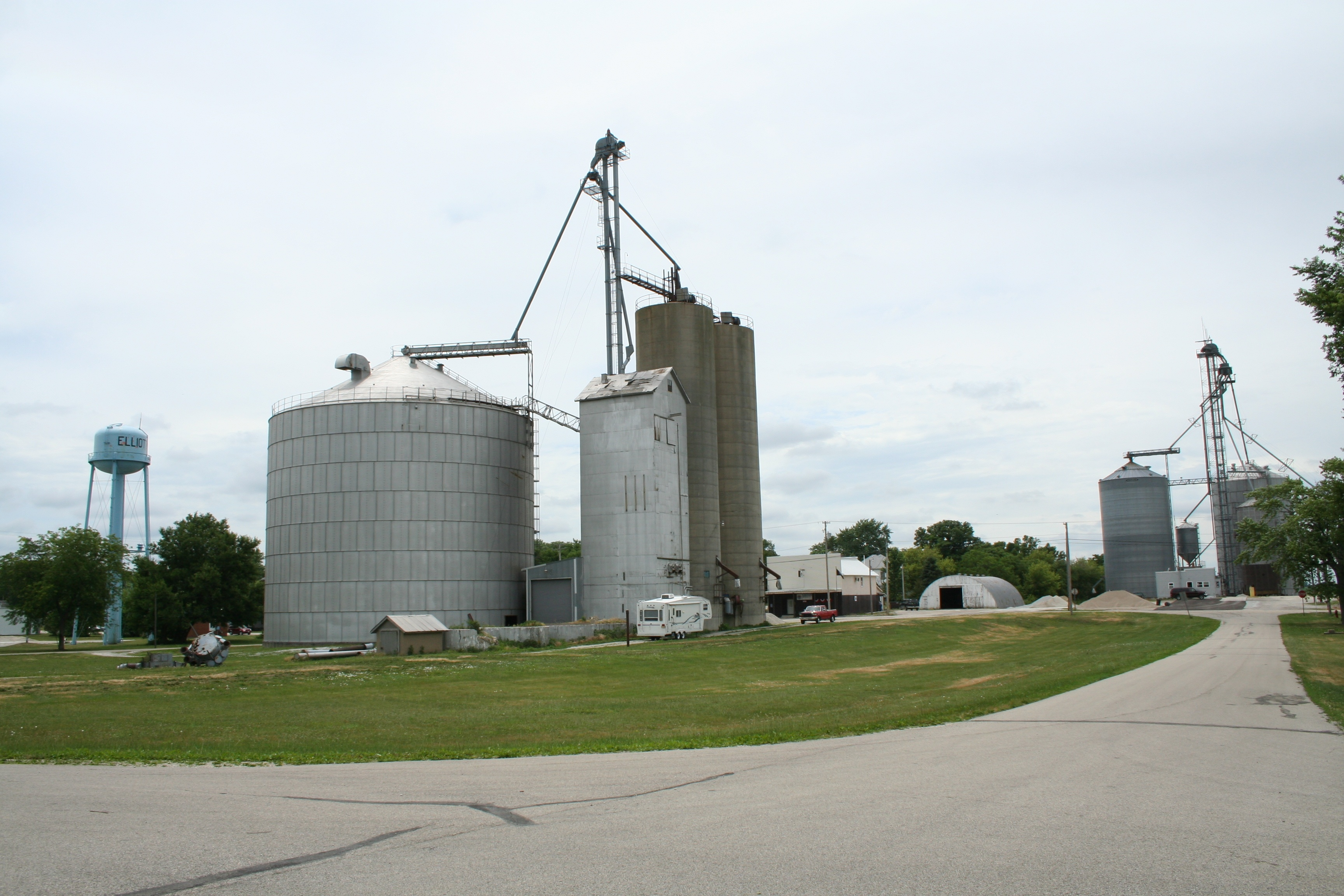
Elliott Illinois Water tower and grain elevator.

According to the 2021 census gazetteer files, Elliott has a total area of 0.50 square miles (1.29 km^{2}), all land.

== Demographics ==
Historical population
Census	Pop.	Note	%±
1880	172		—
1910	371		—
1920	344		−7.3%
1930	301		−12.5%
1940	332		10.3%
1950	337		1.5%
1960	343		1.8%
1970	365		6.4%
1980	370		1.4%
1990	309		−16.5%
2000	341		10.4%
2010	295		−13.5%
2020	274		−7.1%
U.S. Decennial Census

As of the 2020 census there were 274 people, 150 households, and 101 families residing in the village. The population density was 550.20 inhabitants per square mile (212.43/km^{2}). There were 131 housing units at an average density of 263.05 per square mile (101.56/km^{2}). The racial makeup of the village was 97.45% White, 0.00% African American, 0.00% Native American, 0.00% Asian, 0.00% Pacific Islander, 0.36% from other races, and 2.19% from two or more races. Hispanic or Latino of any race were 0.36% of the population.

There were 150 households, out of which 23.3% had children under the age of 18 living with them, 48.67% were married couples living together, 10.00% had a female householder with no husband present, and 32.67% were non-families. 29.33% of all households were made up of individuals, and 12.67% had someone living alone who was 65 years of age or older. The average household size was 2.39 and the average family size was 2.07.

The village's age distribution consisted of 18.7% under the age of 18, 8.7% from 18 to 24, 22.6% from 25 to 44, 24.2% from 45 to 64, and 25.8% who were 65 years of age or older. The median age was 46.0 years. For every 100 females, there were 109.5 males. For every 100 females age 18 and over, there were 135.5 males.

The median income for a household in the village was $46,667, and the median income for a family was $48,750. Males had a median income of $32,321 versus $28,929 for females. The per capita income for the village was $26,593. About 16.8% of families and 16.0% of the population were below the poverty line, including 30.9% of those under age 18 and 7.5% of those age 65 or over.
