= Illinois Route 54 =

State highway in central Illinois, US

Illinois Route 54
- 33rd Division Memorial Highway; Old U.S. Route 54
- IL 54 highlighted in red

Route information
- Maintained by IDOT
- Length: 109.35 mi (175.98 km)
- Existed: 1972–present

Major junctions
- West end: I-55 near Springfield
- US 51 in Clinton; US 150 in Farmer City; I-74 in Farmer City; US 136 in Bellflower; I-57 in Onarga
- East end: US 45 in Onarga

Location
- Country: United States
- State: Illinois
- Counties: Sangamon, Logan, DeWitt, McLean, Champaign, Ford, Iroquois

Highway system
- Illinois State Highway System; Interstate; US; State; Tollways; Scenic
← US 54	→ I-55

Illinois Route 54 (IL 54) is a 109.35-mile-long (175.98 km) east–west highway in east-central Illinois. It passes through the cities of Clinton, Gibson City, and Onarga. Its western terminus is at Interstate 55 (I-55) in Springfield. Its eastern terminus is at U.S. Route 45 (US 45) at Onarga, one mile (1.6 km) east of I-57.

== Route description ==
IL 54 runs southwest-to-northeast from Springfield. It is now mainly a local road, as I-55 and I-57 have become preferred for long distance travel in the region. It is considered the worst stretch of road in the Illinois Highway System due to the incredibly rough surface of the road where it starts near Springfield.

== History ==
Until 1972, IL 54 was signed as US 54. US 54 now terminates between Pittsfield and Griggsville at mile marker 35 on I-72/US 36. The US 54 alignment between this point and IL 54's current western terminus has since been replaced by the combined I-72/US 36 freeway and I-55. This is a gap of 78 miles (126 km).

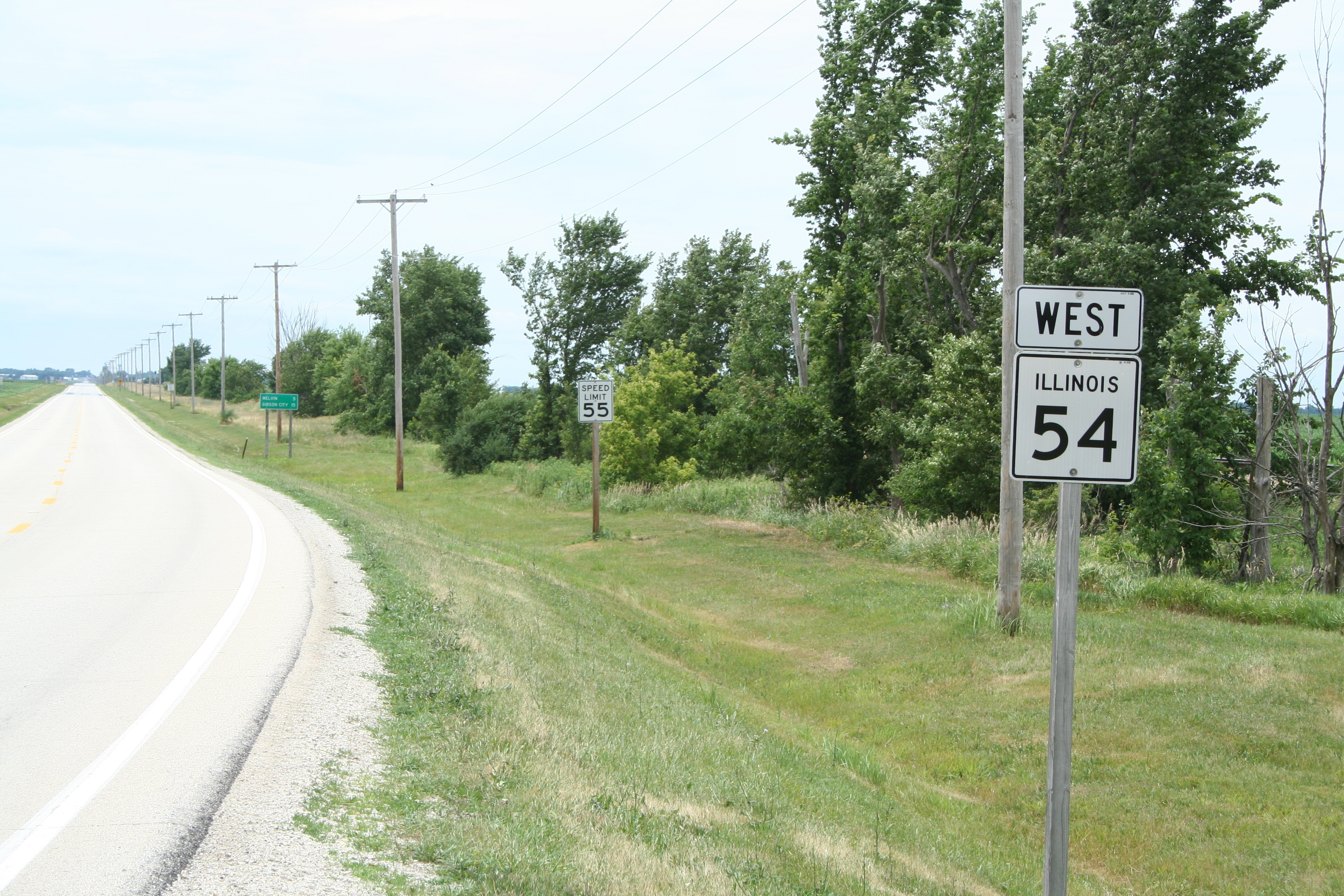
IL 54 south of Roberts

== Major intersections ==
County	Location	mi	km	Destinations	Notes
Sangamon	Springfield	0.00	0.00	Sangamon Avenue – Springfield	Continuation beyond I-55; former US 54 west; I-55 exit 100B; serves Abraham Lincoln Capital Airport
Sangamon	Springfield	0.00	0.00	I-55 – Chicago, St. Louis	Southern terminus; I-55 exit 100A
Logan	Mount Pulaski Township	21.8	35.1	IL 121 – Mt. Pulaski, Lincoln, Mount Pulaski Courthouse State Historic Site, Decatur	Access via McDonald Street
DeWitt	Clinton	40.1	64.5	US 51	
DeWitt	Clinton	40.9	65.8	IL 10 west	West end of IL 10 overlap
DeWitt	Clinton	41.2	66.3	US 51 Bus. (Grant Street)	
DeWitt	Clinton	41.7	67.1	IL 10 east	East end of IL 10 overlap
DeWitt	Fullerton	53.8	86.6	IL 48 south	
DeWitt	Farmer City	60.4	97.2	US 150 – Bloomington, Champaign	
DeWitt	Farmer City	61.0	98.2	I-74 – Bloomington, Champaign	I-74 exit 159
McLean	Bellflower Township	66.5	107.0	US 136	
Champaign	No major junctions				
Ford	Gibson City	80.5	129.6	IL 9 west / IL 47 north	West end of IL 9 / IL 47 overlap
Ford	Gibson City	81.0	130.4	IL 47 south	East end of IL 47 overlap
Ford	Gibson City	81.5	131.2	IL 9 east	East end of IL 9 overlap
Ford	Roberts	96.6	155.5	IL 115 south	West end of IL 115 overlap
Ford	Roberts	97.1	156.3	IL 115 north	East end of IL 115 overlap
Iroquois	Onarga Township	108.2	174.1	I-57 – Champaign, Kankakee	I-57 exit 280
Iroquois	Onarga	109.35	175.98	US 45 (Oak Street) – Gilman, Buckley	Eastern terminus; road continues as Seminary Avenue
1.000 mi = 1.609 km; 1.000 km = 0.621 mi: Concurrency terminus
