= Illinois Route 9 =

East-west state highway in Illinois, US

Illinois Route 9
- IL 9 highlighted in red

Route information
- Maintained by IDOT
- Length: 218.31 mi (351.34 km)
- Existed: November 5, 1918–present

Major junctions
- West end: Fort Madison Toll Bridge at the Iowa state line in Niota
- US 67 / IL 110 (CKC) in Good Hope; US 24 in Banner; US 24 in Bartonville; I-155 in Tremont; US 150 in Normal; I-55 / I-74 / US 51 in Bloomington; US 150 in Bloomington; I-57 in Paxton; US 45 in Paxton; IL 1 in Hoopeston
- East end: SR 26 / SR 352 in Hoopeston

Location
- Country: United States
- State: Illinois
- Counties: Hancock, McDonough, Fulton, Peoria, Tazewell, McLean, Ford, Vermilion

Highway system
- Illinois State Highway System; Interstate; US; State; Tollways; Scenic
← IL 8	→ IL 10

Illinois Route 9 (IL 9) is a 218.31-mile-long (351.34 km) cross-state, east–west rural state highway in the central part of the U.S. state of Illinois. It travels from Niota at the Fort Madison Toll Bridge, that crosses the Mississippi River into Iowa, eastward across central Illinois to State Road 26 (SR 26) at the Indiana state line.

== Route description ==
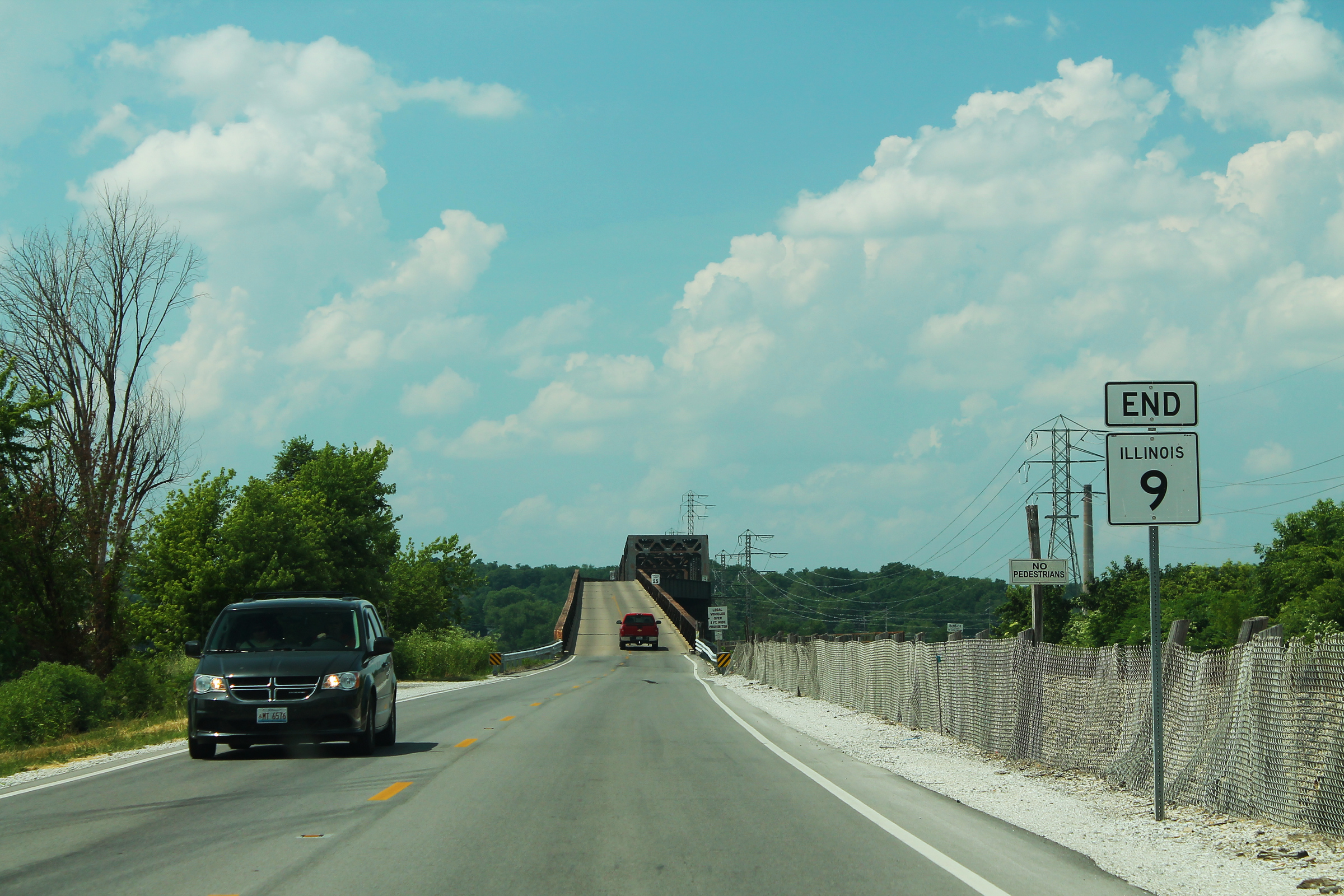
Western terminus at the Fort Madison Toll Bridge

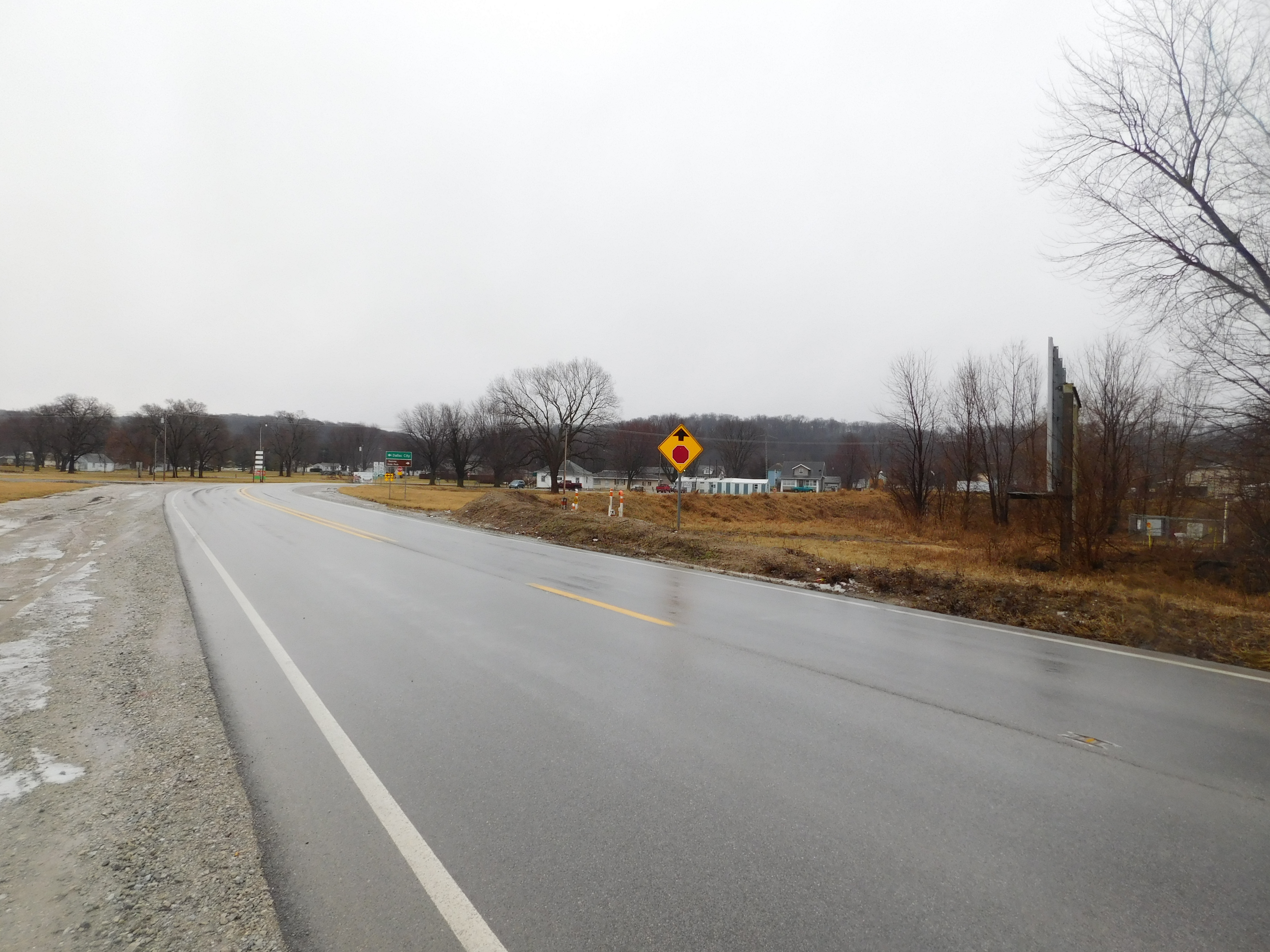
IL 9 east just after the Fort Madison Toll Bridge

IL 9 is a major arterial route in rural central Illinois. It is a parallel highway to IL 116 to the north and U.S. Route 136 (US 136) to its south. It is a two-lane highway for most of its length.

Illinois Route 9 runs eastward from the Mississippi River at the Fort Madison Toll Bridge to the Indiana state line near Cheneyville at SR 26 and SR 352. It crosses the Illinois River on the John T. McNaughton Bridge at Pekin, where it becomes known as Court Street in the city. It has an interchange with I-155 at Tremont; I-55/I-74 at Bloomington; and Interstate 57 (I-57) at Paxton.

== History ==
IL 9 was established in 1918 as one of the original 46 State Bond Issue Route (SBI) routes. The routing of IL 9 has had two major changes since its establishment.

The original western terminus was in Hamilton, at the old Keokuk Rail Bridge completed in 1916 and then proceeded east through Carthage and Macomb (county seats of Hancock and McDonough counties), 9 miles (14 km) east of Macomb, southwest of New Philadelphia, the highway turned north to Bushnell and then proceeded east along the current IL 9 alignment to Canton, Peoria County, and Pekin.

- US 136, Hamilton to New Philadelphia,
- IL 41, New Philadelphia to Bushnell
- IL 9, Bushnell to Indiana state line.

This current highway moved north to terminate in Niota at the Fort Madison Toll Bridge (longest double-deck swing-span bridge in the world) after its completion in July 1928. The route parallels the Atchison, Topeka and Santa Fe Railway and Mississippi River to Dallas City then turns slightly southeast to LaHarpe. From LaHarpe, the highway parallels the original Toledo, Peoria and Western Railway right-of way to Bushnell.

From 1935 to 1937, IL 9 traveled a different route from Pekin to Bloomington, that original route is now posted as:

- IL 29, Pekin to North Pekin,
- IL 98, North Pekin to Morton,
- US 150, Morton to Bloomington.

== Future ==
Between Macomb and Peoria, the next section of IL 336 is being studied Portions of IL 9 are being considered for the IL 336 project from Peoria to Macomb.

== Major intersections ==
County	Location	mi	km	Destinations	Notes
Mississippi River		0.0	0.0	To US 61 Bus.	Continuation into Iowa, historical Waubonsie Trail
Mississippi River		0.0	0.0	Fort Madison Toll Bridge (cash only)	
Hancock	Niota	0.9	1.4	IL 96	Western end of IL 96 concurrency; last westbound exit before toll
Hancock	Dallas City	7.3	11.7	IL 96	Eastern end of IL 96 concurrency
Hancock		14.0	22.5	IL 94	Western end of IL 94 concurrency
Hancock	LaHarpe	20.0	32.2	IL 94	Eastern end of IL 94 concurrency
McDonough	Good Hope	40.0	64.4	US 67 / IL 110 (CKC)	
McDonough	Bushnell	49.7	80.0	IL 41	Western end of IL 41 concurrency
McDonough	Prairie City	54.0	86.9	IL 41	Eastern end of IL 41 concurrency
Fulton	Canton	72.6	116.8	IL 78	
Fulton	Banner	80.8	130.0	US 24	Western end of US 24 concurrency
Peoria	Orchard Mines	94.6	152.2	US 24	Eastern end of US 24 concurrency
Illinois River		96.3	155.0	John T. McNaughton Bridge	
Tazewell	Pekin	96.5	155.3	IL 29 south (2nd Street)	One-way street, outbound access only; western end of IL 29 concurrency
Tazewell	Pekin	96.55	155.38	IL 29 (3rd Street)	One-way street, inbound access only
Tazewell	Pekin	96.8	155.8	IL 29 north (5th Street)	Eastern end of IL 29 concurrency
Tazewell	Tremont	107.0	172.2	I-155 – Lincoln, Peoria	I-155 exit 25
McLean	Bloomington Heights	131.0	210.8	US 150 west	Western end of US 150 concurrency
McLean	Bloomington Heights	133.0	214.0	I-55 / I-74 / US 51 – Springfield, Champaign, Decatur, Joliet, Peoria, Rockford	I-55 exit 160
McLean	Bloomington	135	217	US 51 Bus. south (Center Street) / Historic US 66	One-way street
McLean	Bloomington	135.05	217.34	US 51 Bus. north (Main Street) / Historic US 66	One-way street
McLean	Bloomington	135.5	218.1	US 150 east (Clinton Street)	Eastern end of US 150 concurrency
McLean	Bloomington	136	219	I-55 BL (Veterans Parkway)	
McLean	Ellsworth	144	232	IL 165 north	Southern terminus of IL 165
Ford	Gibson City	169	272	IL 47 north	Western end of IL 47 concurrency
Ford	Gibson City	170	270	IL 54 west	Western end of IL 54 concurrency
Ford	Gibson City	170.5	274.4	IL 47 south (Sangamon Avenue)	Eastern end of IL 47 concurrency
Ford	Gibson City	171	275	IL 54 east (Lawrence Street)	Western end of IL 54 concurrency; serves Gibson Area Hospital
Ford	Elliott	181	291	IL 115 north	Southern terminus of IL 115
Ford	Paxton	183	295	I-57 – Champaign, Kankakee	I-57 exit 261
Ford	Paxton	183.8	295.8	US 45 south (Railroad Avenue)	Western end of US 45 concurrency
Ford	Paxton	184	296	US 45 north (Railroad Avenue)	Eastern end of US 45 concurrency
Vermilion	Rankin	195	314	IL 49	
Vermilion	Hoopeston	206	332	IL 1	
Vermilion	Grant Township	215	346	SR 26 east / SR 352 east	SR 26 continues into Indiana
1.000 mi = 1.609 km; 1.000 km = 0.621 mi: Concurrency terminus; Tolled
