= Gibson City-Melvin-Sibley Community Unit School District 5 =

School district in Illinois, United States

Address
- 307 North Sangamon Avenue Gibson City, Illinois, 60936; United States

District information
- Type: Public
- Grades: PK–12
- Schools: 3
- NCES District ID: 1700041

Students and staff
- Students: 975 (2024–2025)
- Teachers: 88.00 (on an FTE basis) (2024–2025)
- Staff: 76.00 (on an FTE basis) (2024–2025)
- Student–teacher ratio: 11.08 (2024–2025)

Gibson City-Melvin-Sibley School District is a K-12 public school district based in Gibson City, Illinois.

In Champaign County the district includes Foosland.

== History ==
GCMS organized through a consolidation between the Gibson City and Melvin-Sibley "Mel-Sib" school districts in 1993. All of the district's school buildings are located within Gibson City, but the middle school was located in the old Melvin-Sibley High School in Melvin until 2001. The district has three schools, GCMS Elementary School, GCMS Middle School, and the GCMS High School.

GCMS's Project Ignition, a program designed to teach awareness about distracted and safe driving, won a national competition in 2006.

GCMS recently (April 2011) completed a renovation/addition to its elementary school building. New windows were added to all classrooms for the first time.

== Administration ==
The superintendent of GCMS is Jeremy Darnell. The three principals of the district are Justin Kean (elementary), Kent Nash (middle), and Kyle Bielfelt (high school).

== Athletics ==
The high schools' sports teams compete in the Heart of Illinois Conference and are called the GCMS Falcons. The longtime mascot of Gibson City was the Greyhounds, while Mel-Sib's was the Rams. The GCMS football team has been to the IHSA state playoffs for eight years in a row. They finished 4th in 2009. In 2017, the Falcons won the first ever team state championship in Gibson City and GCMS history by defeating the Maroa-Forsyth Trojans at Huskie Stadium in DeKalb. The school's track team has produced multiple state champions, most recently in 2012.
