= U.S. Route 161 =

Former U.S. Numbered Highway in Iowa, United States

U.S. Highway 161
- US 161 highlighted in gray

Route information
- Auxiliary route of US 61
- Maintained by Iowa DOT
- Length: 185 mi (298 km)
- Existed: July 1, 1926–January 1938

Major junctions
- South end: Missouri state line south of Keokuk
- US 61 at Keokuk; US 34 at Mount Pleasant; US 6 at Iowa City; US 30 at Cedar Rapids; Iowa 64 at Anamosa
- North end: US 61 at Key West

Location
- Country: United States
- State: Iowa
- Counties: Lee, Henry, Washington, Johnson, Linn, Jones, Dubuque

Highway system
- United States Numbered Highway System; List; Special; Divided; Iowa Primary Highway System; Interstate; US; State; Secondary; Scenic
← Iowa 160	→ Iowa 163

U.S. Highway 161 (US 161) was a 185-mile (298 km) U.S. Numbered Highway in Iowa, United States, that ran from Keokuk to Dubuque by way of Cedar Rapids. It was designated in 1925 and signed in 1926 along two primary highways. The route began at the Mississippi River with U.S. Route 61 (US 61) southwest of Keokuk ran north through Mount Pleasant and Iowa City to Cedar Rapids. There, it turned to the northeast through Anamosa and Monticello towards Dubuque. The route ended at US 61 in Key West, a few miles west of Dubuque.

The route changed very little while it was in service. It was paved from end to end by the summer of 1932. In January 1938, it was removed from the United States Numbered Highway System. From Keokuk to Cedar Rapids, it was replaced by U.S. Route 218, which was extended southward. From Cedar Rapids to Key West it was replaced by U.S. Route 151, which was extended westward.

== Route description ==
US 161 began on the US 61 bridge over the Des Moines River, which formes the border between Missouri and Iowa. The two routes ran concurrently within one-half mile (800 m) of the Mississippi River until they reached Keokuk, where the two routes turned to the northeast and turned away from the river. As the highway curved to the north, it passed the now-unincorporated towns of Mooar and Summitville. Southwest of Montrose, US 61 split off to the northeast to run along the banks of the Mississippi.

After the US 61 split, US 161 continued northeast towards Donnellson along Main Street where it met Iowa Highway 3 (Iowa 3). North of Donnellson, the highway diverted away from the Keokuk and Northwestern Railroad, which the highway had theretofore closely paralleled the railway. As the highway headed due north towards Mount Pleasant, it passed many small communities, but did not enter any of them. West of West Point, it intersected Iowa 103, which served as a shortcut to Fort Madison until 2003. Iowa 16 intersected the highway in northern Lee County.

Shortly after it entered Henry County, US 161 intersected Iowa 125, a short spur highway that connected Salem to the primary highway system. The road headed due north, jogging to the east only slightly to cross the Skunk River. In Mount Pleasant, it intersected US 34 and Iowa 133. Further north, it briefly overlapped Iowa 78 near Olds.

In Washington County, US 161 only intersected two primary highways: Iowa 2 near Ainsworth and Iowa 22 near Riverside. In Johnson County, the highway entered the Iowa City area from the south. Iowa 1 joined US 161 from the southwest and the two routes briefly headed north together. At the banks of the Iowa River, they were joined by US 6, and all three routes crossed the river. US 6 split away from the two routes near the University of Iowa Pentacrest. A few blocks north of campus, Iowa 1 split away to the east. A few more blocks north was the southern end of Iowa 261. North of Iowa City, the highway crossed back over the Iowa River and headed to the northwest towards North Liberty, where it intersected Iowa 153.

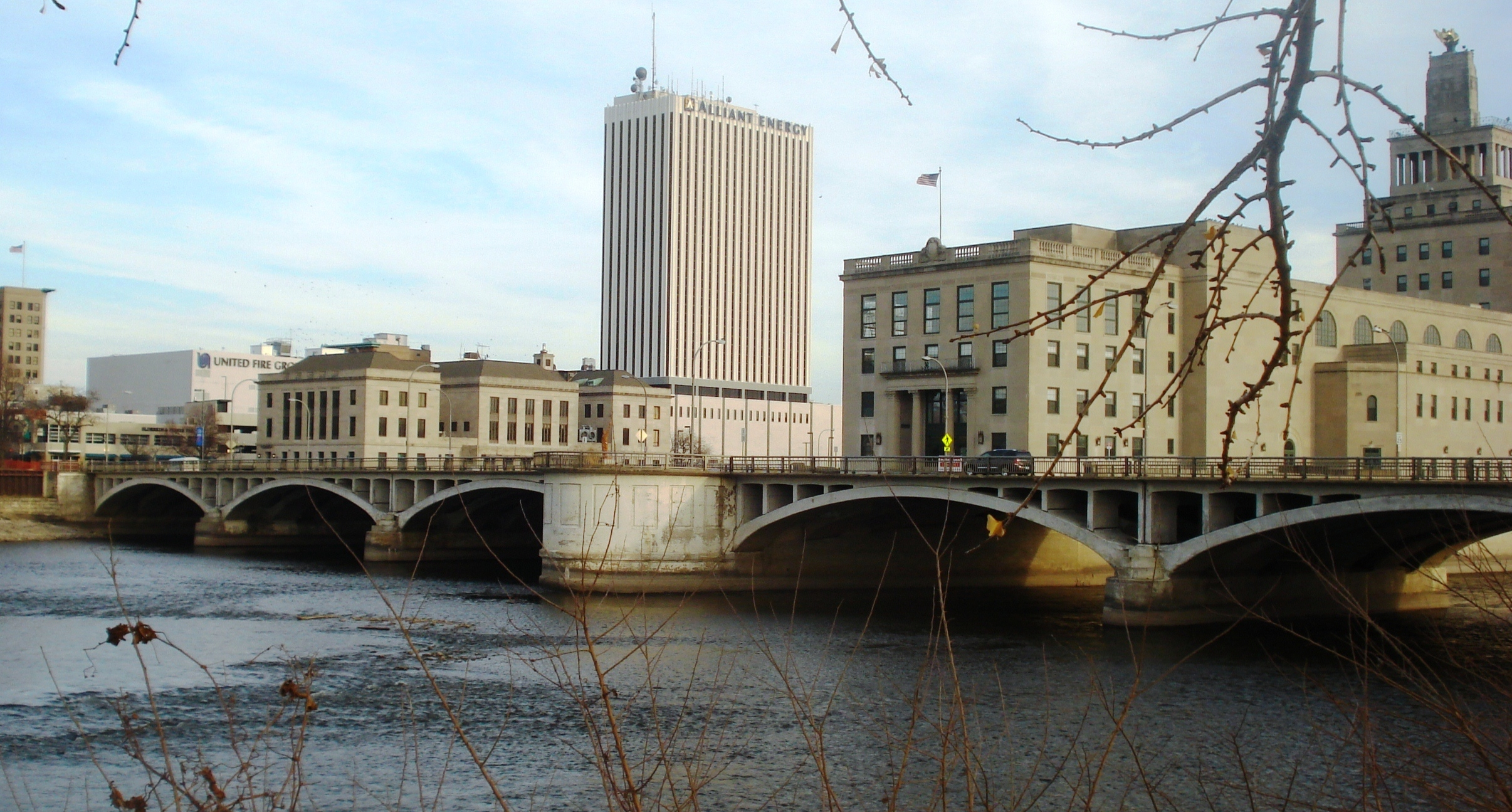
US 161 crossed the Cedar River in Cedar Rapids on the First Avenue Bridge

US 161 continued to the northwest before turning north at its last Iowa River crossing. It passed through Shueyville and entered Linn County. It entered the Cedar Rapids area from the southwest side, where it intersected US 30 and Iowa 64. The three highways headed to the northeast towards and crossed the Cedar River before entering downtown. East of downtown, US 30 split away to the east near the intersection with Iowa 11. US 161 and Iowa 64 continued northeast towards Marion, where they met Iowa 94 near its downtown. Outside of Marion, they intersected Iowa 13.

Southwest of Anamosa, the two routes met the northern end of Iowa 261. Closer to Anamosa, they crossed the Wapsipinicon River before Iowa 64 split away to the east. Now heading northeast, US 161 traversed the farmland of Jones County. In Monticello, it met the ends of Iowa 38 and Iowa 113. It crossed the South Fork Maquoketa River and headed towards Cascade, where it crossed the north fork of the river. At Cascade, US 161 met the ends of Iowa 136 and Iowa 188. Now in Dubuque County, the highway continued northeast past the New Melleray Abbey. The route ended at an intersection with US 61 in Key West, a few miles west of Dubuque.

== History ==
US 161 was an original U.S. Highway; it and the rest of the system were designated in 1925 and were signed by the summer of 1926. US 161 replaced parts of two primary roads in eastern Iowa – Primary Road No. 40, which was known as the Red Ball Route, from Keokuk to Cedar Rapids, and Primary Road No. 28, parts of which were known as the Red X Route. The northernmost forty miles (64 km) of US 161 were a part of a territorial and military road from Dubuque to Iowa City. This road, authorized by President Martin Van Buren in 1839, was known as Dillon's Furrow, named after the Dubuque merchant Lyman Dillon who surveyed the route and marked it with a furrow.

Upon designation, only a small portion of US 161 was paved, all of which was located in and around Cedar Rapids. A short section in Keokuk and the remainder of the route north of Cedar Rapids was graveled, but not paved. A $100 million bond bill ($1.88 billion in 2025 dollars) passed and approved by a plebiscite in 1928 allowed paving to commence in earnest. The entire routing of US 161 was to be completed within six years. Paving work progressed faster in some counties than it did in others. By 1930, a hard-surfaced road existed from the Missouri state line to Olds in Henry County (55 mi or 89 km) and from Iowa City to northeast of Cascade in Dubuque County (75 mi or 121 km). All 185 miles (298 km) of the route were paved by June 1932.

In January 1938, US 161 was removed from the U.S. Numbered Highway System. From Keokuk to Cedar Rapids, it was replaced by US 218, which had previously ended at US 30 south of Vinton. US 218 was extended eastward along US 30 and then southward towards Keokuk. From Cedar Rapids to Key West, it was replaced by US 151, which had previously only existed in Wisconsin. US 151 was routed westward from Madison along US 18 to Dodgeville, then along US 118 to Dickeyville, then along US 61 into Iowa to Key West, and then along US 161 to Cedar Rapids.

== Major intersections ==
County	Location	mi	km	Destinations	Notes
Des Moines River		0	0.0	US 161 began at the Des Moines River	
Lee	Montrose Township	10	16	US 61 north	Northern end of US 61 overlap
Lee	Donnellson	22	35	Iowa 3	
Lee	Franklin–Marion township line	28	45	Iowa 103 east	
Lee	Marion Township	32	51	Iowa 16	
Henry	Jackson Township	36	58	Iowa 125 west	
Henry	Mount Pleasant	44	71	US 34 / Iowa 133 south	
Henry	Wayne Township	56	90	Iowa 78 east	Southern end of Iowa 78 overlap
Henry	Wayne Township	57	92	Iowa 78 west	Northern end of Iowa 78 overlap
Washington	Oregon Township	68	109	Iowa 2	
Washington	Iowa Township	82	132	Iowa 22	
Johnson	Iowa City	94	151	Iowa 1	
Johnson	Iowa City	94	151	US 6	
Johnson	Iowa City	94	151	Iowa 261 north	
Johnson	North Liberty	101	163	Iowa 153 south	
Linn	Cedar Rapids	119	192	US 30 west / Iowa 64 west	Southern end of US 30 and Iowa 64 overlaps
Linn	Cedar Rapids	120	190	US 30 east	Northern end of US 30 overlap
Linn	Cedar Rapids	121	195	Iowa 11 north	
Linn	Marion	125	201	Iowa 94 south	
Linn	Marion	127	204	Iowa 13	
Jones	Fairview Township	139	224	Iowa 261 south	
Jones	Anamosa	143	230	Iowa 64 east	Northern end of Iowa 64 overlap
Jones	Monticello	154	248	Iowa 38 south / Iowa 113 north	
Dubuque	Cascade	164	264	Iowa 136 south / Iowa 188 north	
Dubuque	Key West	185	298	US 61	
1.000 mi = 1.609 km; 1.000 km = 0.621 mi: Concurrency terminus

== See also ==
- List of U.S. Highways in Iowa
