= Iowa Highway 394 =

State highway in Iowa, United States

Iowa Highway 394
- Iowa 394 highlighted in red

Route information
- Maintained by Iowa State Highway Commission
- Length: 10.454 mi (16.824 km)
- Existed: 1980–2005

Major junctions
- South end: Route B at St. Francisville, Mo.
- North end: US 218 near Donnellson

Location
- Country: United States
- State: Iowa
- Counties: Lee

Highway system
- Iowa Primary Highway System; Interstate; US; State; Secondary; Scenic
← Iowa 393	→ Iowa 395

Iowa Highway 394 (Iowa 394) was a state highway in Lee County in southeastern Iowa. It began on a toll bridge to St. Francisville, Missouri, over the Des Moines River and ended at U.S. Highway 218 (US 218) south of Donnellson. The highway was in service from 1980 to 2005. It was replaced by Iowa 27 as part of the larger Avenue of the Saints corridor project.

== Route description ==
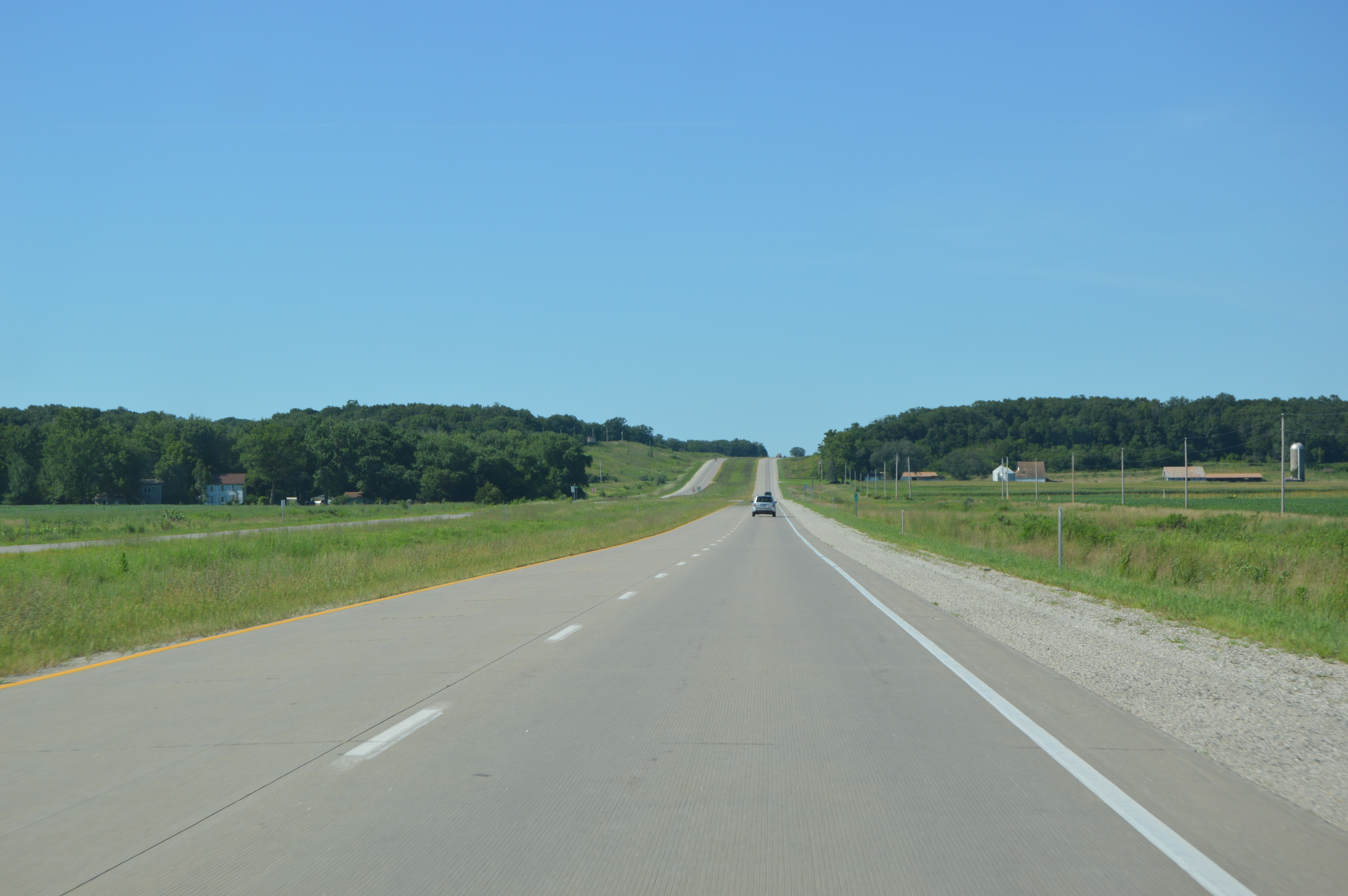
Iowa 27 just north of the Des Moines River over the old alignment of Iowa 394

Iowa 394 began on a toll bridge over the Des Moines River. To the south, the highway continued into St. Francisville, Missouri, and Clark County as Route B. The highway headed due north out of the river valley and into Argyle, where it had a level crossing with the BNSF Railway that also carries Amtrak's Southwest Chief. The highway continued due north for a few miles until it reached US 218 south of Donnellson.

== History ==
Iowa 394 was added to the primary highway system on July 1, 1980. In 1991, Iowa 394 was identified as part of the Avenue of the Saints corridor, which was envisioned as a high-speed highway connecting St. Louis, Missouri, and St. Paul, Minnesota. Through the late 1990s and early 2000s, construction occurred on the new four-lane Avenue of the Saints highway. In August 2001, the Iowa Department of Transportation gave the corridor a single route number — Iowa 27 — in order to aid drivers navigating the route. Shortly thereafter, signs for Iowa 394 were removed from Iowa 27 south of US 218. While signs were removed in 2001, Iowa 394 still existed on paper until March 15, 2005. At the same time, the portions of the highway that were not bypassed by the new four-lane highway were re-designated as Iowa 460.

== Major intersections ==
The entire route was in Lee County.

Location	mi	km	Destinations	Notes
Des Moines River	0.000	0.000	Route B	Continuation into Missouri
Des Moines River	0.000	0.000	Toll bridge; Missouri–Iowa state line	
Charleston Township	10.454	16.824	US 218 – Donnellson, Keokuk	
1.000 mi = 1.609 km; 1.000 km = 0.621 mi: Tolled
