= Sandusky, Iowa =

- Census-designated place
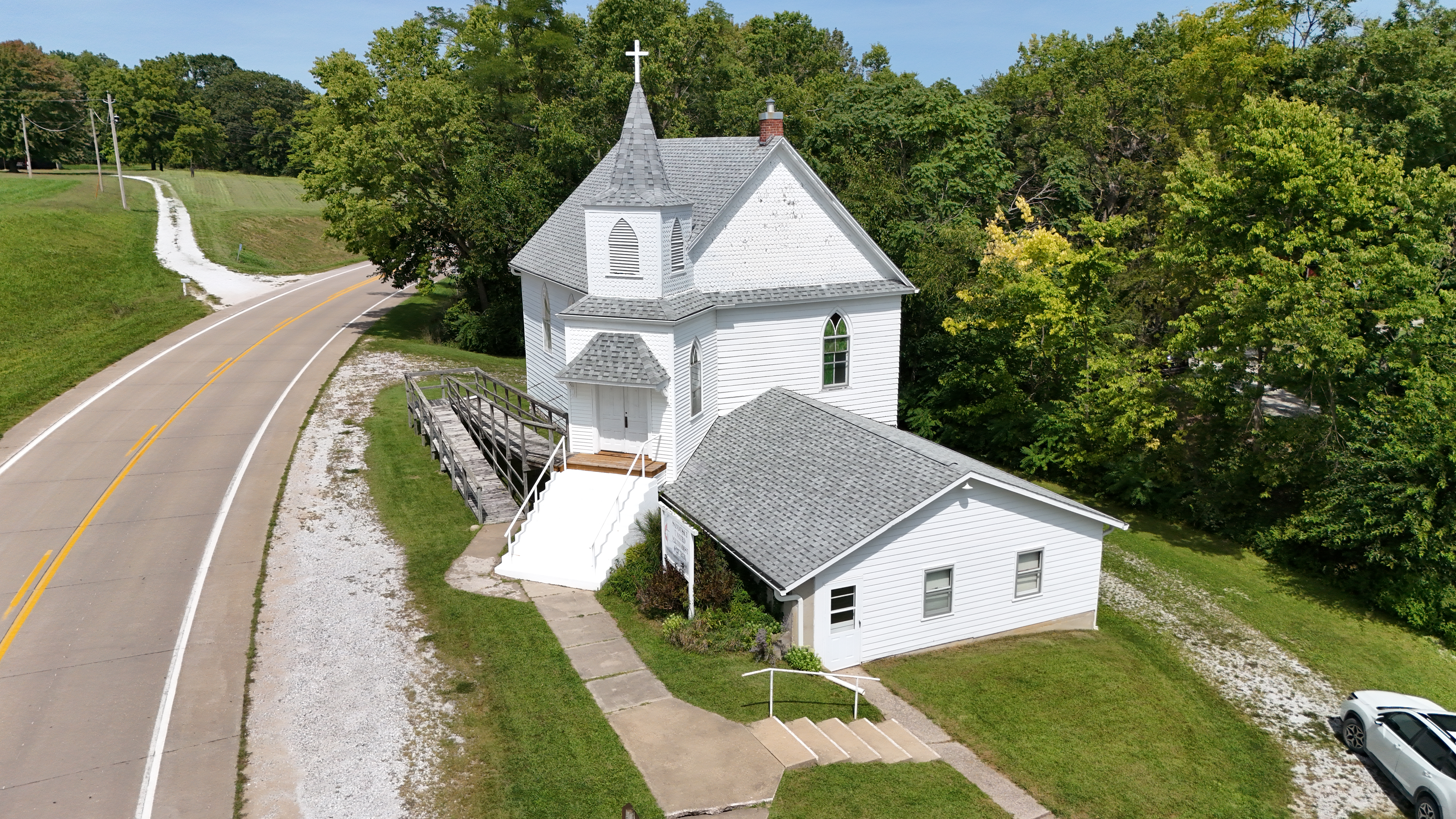
- The United Methodist Church in Sandusky

- Location within Iowa Location within the United States
- Coordinates: 40°27′52″N 91°23′13″W
- Country: US
- State: Iowa
- County: Lee
- Townships: Jackson; Montrose

Area
  - Total: 2.67 sq mi (6.91 km^{2})
  - Land: 1.42 sq mi (3.69 km^{2})
  - Water: 1.24 sq mi (3.22 km^{2})
- Elevation: 543 ft (166 m)

Population (2020)
  - Total: 297
  - Density: 208.4/sq mi (80.45/km^{2})
- Time zone: UTC-6 (Central (CST))
  - Summer (DST): UTC-5 (CDT)
- ZIP Code: 52632 (Keokuk)
- Area code: 319
- FIPS code: 19-70545
- GNIS feature ID: 2804144

Sandusky is an unincorporated community and census-designated place (CDP) in Lee County, Iowa, United States. It is in the southeast part of the county, on the west bank of the Mississippi River 4 miles (6 km) north of Keokuk, the county seat, and 6 miles (10 km) south of Montrose.

Sandusky was first listed as a CDP prior to the 2020 census. As of the 2020 census, its population was 297.

== Demographics ==
=== 2020 census ===
Historical population
| Census | Pop. | Note | %± |
|---|---|---|---|
| 2020 | 297 | | — |
U.S. Decennial Census

As of the census of 2020, there were 297 people, 146 households, and 124 families residing in the community. The population density was 208.4 inhabitants per square mile (80.4/km^{2}). There were 149 housing units at an average density of 104.5 per square mile (40.4/km^{2}). The racial makeup of the community was 92.9% White, 0.0% Black or African American, 0.3% Native American, 0.7% Asian, 0.0% Pacific Islander, 1.0% from other races and 5.1% from two or more races. Hispanic or Latino persons of any race comprised 1.7% of the population.

Of the 146 households, 26.0% of which had children under the age of 18 living with them, 65.1% were married couples living together, 9.6% were cohabitating couples, 17.8% had a female householder with no spouse or partner present and 7.5% had a male householder with no spouse or partner present. 15.1% of all households were non-families. 8.2% of all households were made up of individuals, 2.1% had someone living alone who was 65 years old or older.

The median age in the community was 49.9 years. 16.5% of the residents were under the age of 20; 3.7% were between the ages of 20 and 24; 24.6% were from 25 and 44; 31.3% were from 45 and 64; and 23.9% were 65 years of age or older. The gender makeup of the community was 60.6% male and 39.4% female.

== History ==
Founded in the 1800s, Sandusky's population was 85 in 1902, and 60 in 1925.
