= New Boston, Iowa =

- Unincorporated community
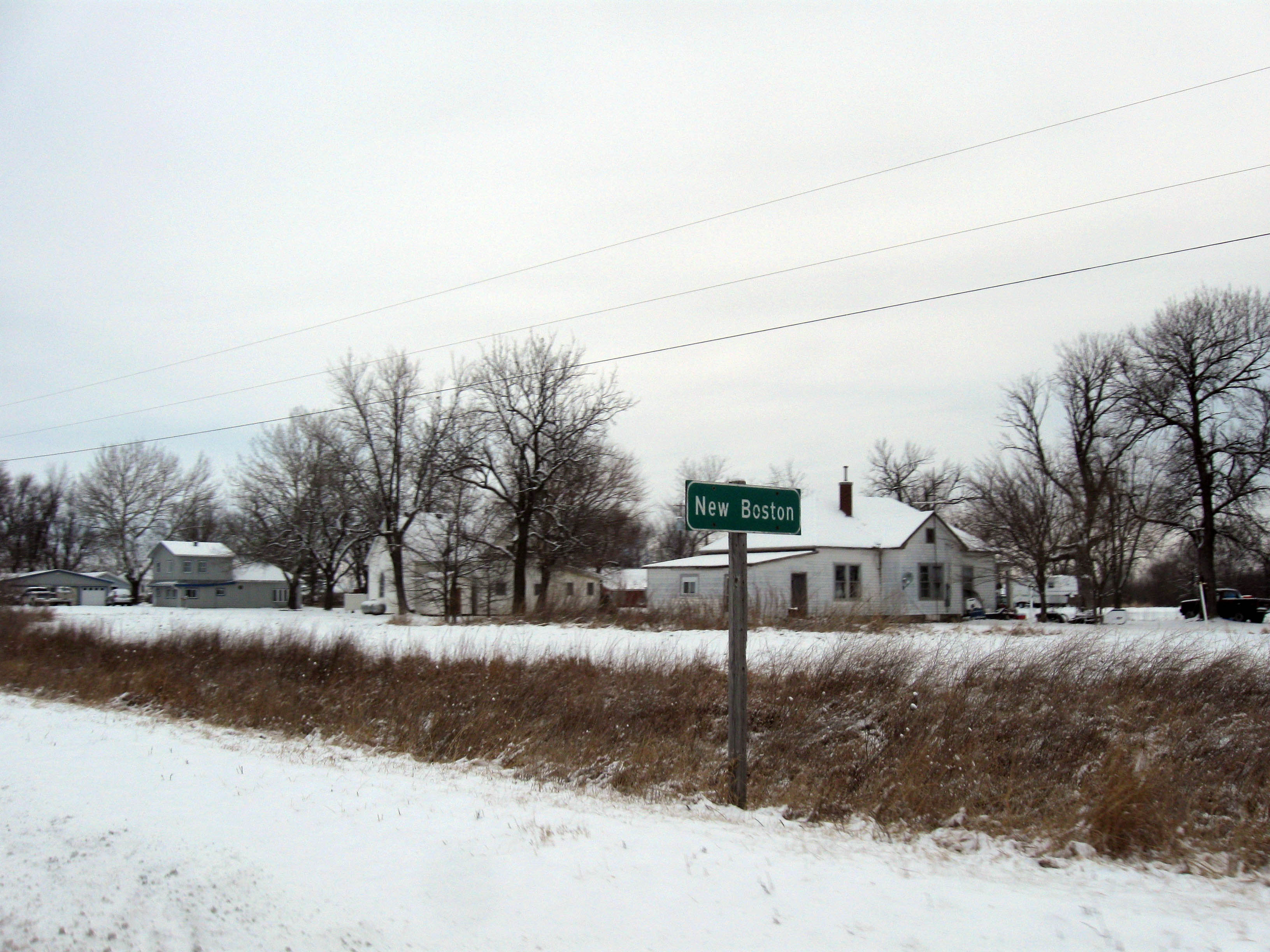
- New Boston, Iowa, From route 218 facing northwest

- Location in Iowa Location in the United States
- Coordinates: 40°33′38″N 91°30′20″W
- Country: United States
- State: Iowa
- County: Lee
- Elevation: 696 ft (212 m)
- Time zone: UTC-6 (Central (CST))
  - Summer (DST): UTC-5 (CDT)
- Area code: 319
- GNIS feature ID: 459469

New Boston is an unincorporated community in central Lee County, Iowa, United States. It lies in the southeast corner of Iowa, along U.S. Highway 218 and southwest of the city of Fort Madison, the county seat of Lee County. New Boston is located nearby to the unincorporated communities of Argyle, Iowa and Charleston, Iowa. The community is part of the Fort Madison–Keokuk, IA-MO Micropolitan Statistical Area.

== History ==
Founded in the mid-1800s, New Boston's population was 56 in 1902, and 26 in 1925. The population was 100 in 1940.
