= John Downey (Iowa politician) =

Irish-born American politician (1834–1906)

John Downey (1834–1906) was an Irish-born American politician.

A native of Belfast born in 1834, Downey sailed to New York City at the age of twenty. He traveled to Ohio two years later, and in 1857, settled in Lee County, Iowa. Throughout his political career, Downey was affiliated with the Democratic Party. He was a trustee of Charleston Township, and served for two decades as a justice of the peace. Between 1894 and 1898, Downey was a member of the Iowa Senate for District 1. Downey fell ill with tuberculosis in 1903, and died of the disease on his farm near Charleston, Iowa, on 28 October 1906.
