= Senator Downey (disambiguation) =

Sheridan Downey (1884–1961) was a U.S. Senator from California from 1939 to 1950. Senator Downey may also refer to:

- Alexander Downey (1817–1898), Indiana State Senate
- Charles L. Downey (1915–1990), Maryland State Senate
- Christine Downey (born 1949), Kansas State Senate
- John Downey (Iowa politician) (1834–1906), Iowa State Senate
- John V. Downey (1895–1960), New York State Senate
