= Franklin, Iowa =

- City
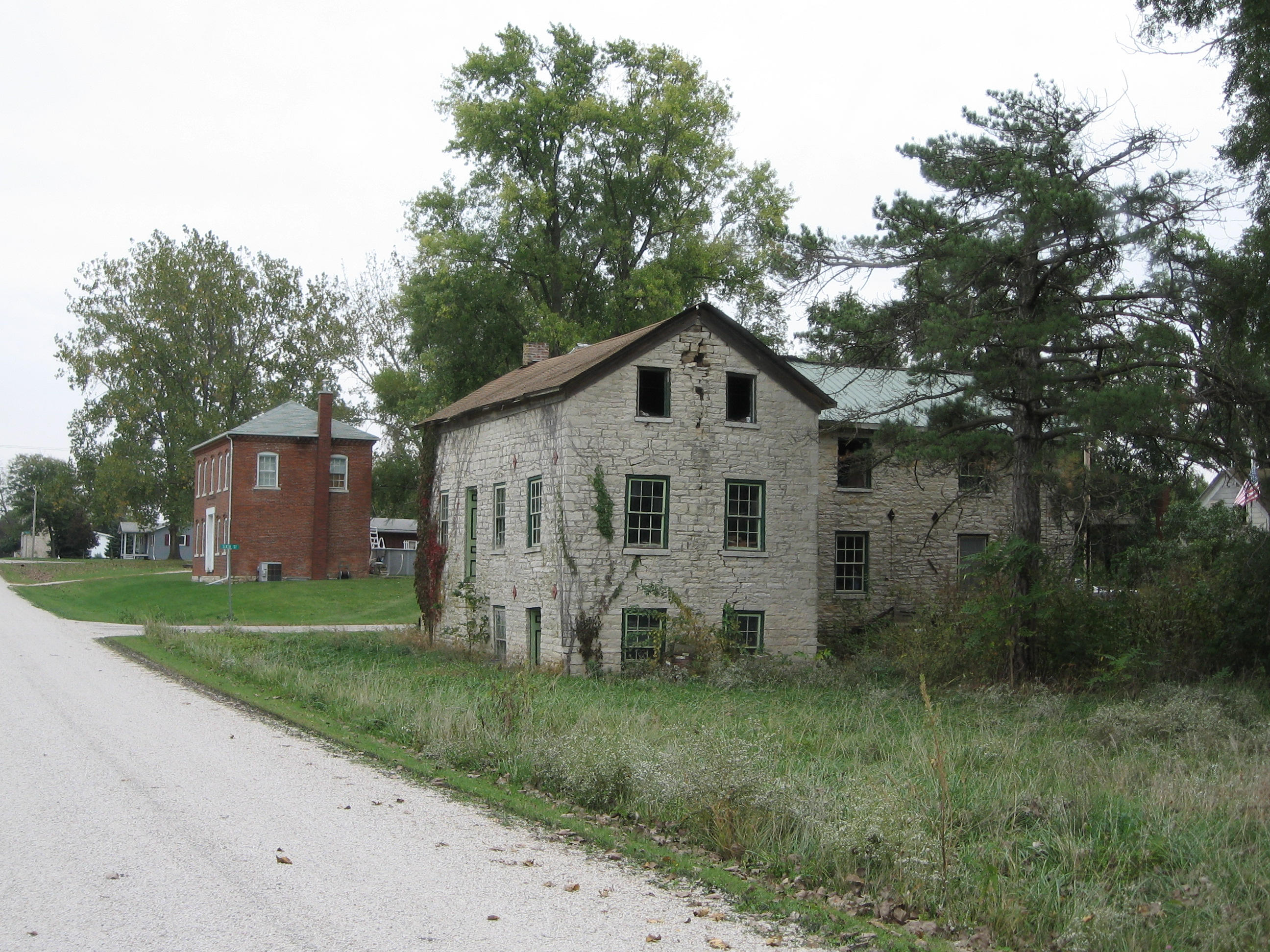
- Examples of architecture in Franklin, Iowa.

- Location of Franklin, Iowa
- Coordinates: 40°40′00″N 91°30′43″W
- Country: United States
- State: Iowa
- County: Lee

Area
  - Total: 0.15 sq mi (0.40 km^{2})
  - Land: 0.15 sq mi (0.40 km^{2})
  - Water: 0 sq mi (0.00 km^{2})
- Elevation: 696 ft (212 m)

Population (2020)
  - Total: 131
  - Density: 841.6/sq mi (324.95/km^{2})
- Time zone: UTC-6 (Central (CST))
  - Summer (DST): UTC-5 (CDT)
- ZIP code: 52625
- Area code: 319
- FIPS code: 19-28740
- GNIS feature ID: 2394810

Franklin is a city in Lee County, Iowa, United States. Franklin is noted for its stone and brick Federal architecture, uncommon in Iowa.

The population was 131 at the time of the 2020 census. It is part of the Fort Madison–Keokuk, IA-IL-MO Micropolitan Statistical Area.

== History ==
Franklin (formerly Franklin Centre) was populated in the late 1830s by farmers like Alexander Cruickshank and German immigrants Henry and Jacob Abel. The first schoolhouse would be built on the Cruickshank farm in 1839. The town was laid out on March 21, 1840, by James L. Scott and Samuel C. Reed. They intended the town to be the county seat of Lee County, though never served as such. The city's namesake is Benjamin Franklin. In 1841 John Gandy and Jesse H. Catting were elected to be justices of the peace. In 1842 the first church in Franklin was constructed by the Methodists. Franklin’s growth was aided due to being positioned on the Chicago, Burlington and Quincy Railroad. In the first ever mayoral town election, Preston Nichols (D) was elected mayor. He was a circuit court judge for 36 years before he was appointed mayor of Franklin.

== Geography ==
According to the United States Census Bureau, the city has a total area of 0.15 square miles (0.39 km^{2}), all land.

Franklin is located in Cedar Township.

== Demographics ==
Historical populations
Year	Pop.	±%
1860	449	—
1870	628	+39.9%
1880	367	−41.6%
1890	333	−9.3%
1900	210	−36.9%
1910	138	−34.3%
1920	119	−13.8%
1930	92	−22.7%
1940	80	−13.0%
1950	146	+82.5%
1960	174	+19.2%
1970	111	−36.2%
1980	142	+27.9%
1990	152	+7.0%
2000	136	−10.5%
2010	143	+5.1%
2020	131	−8.4%
Source:"U.S. Census website". United States Census Bureau. and Iowa Data Center; Source: U.S. Decennial Census

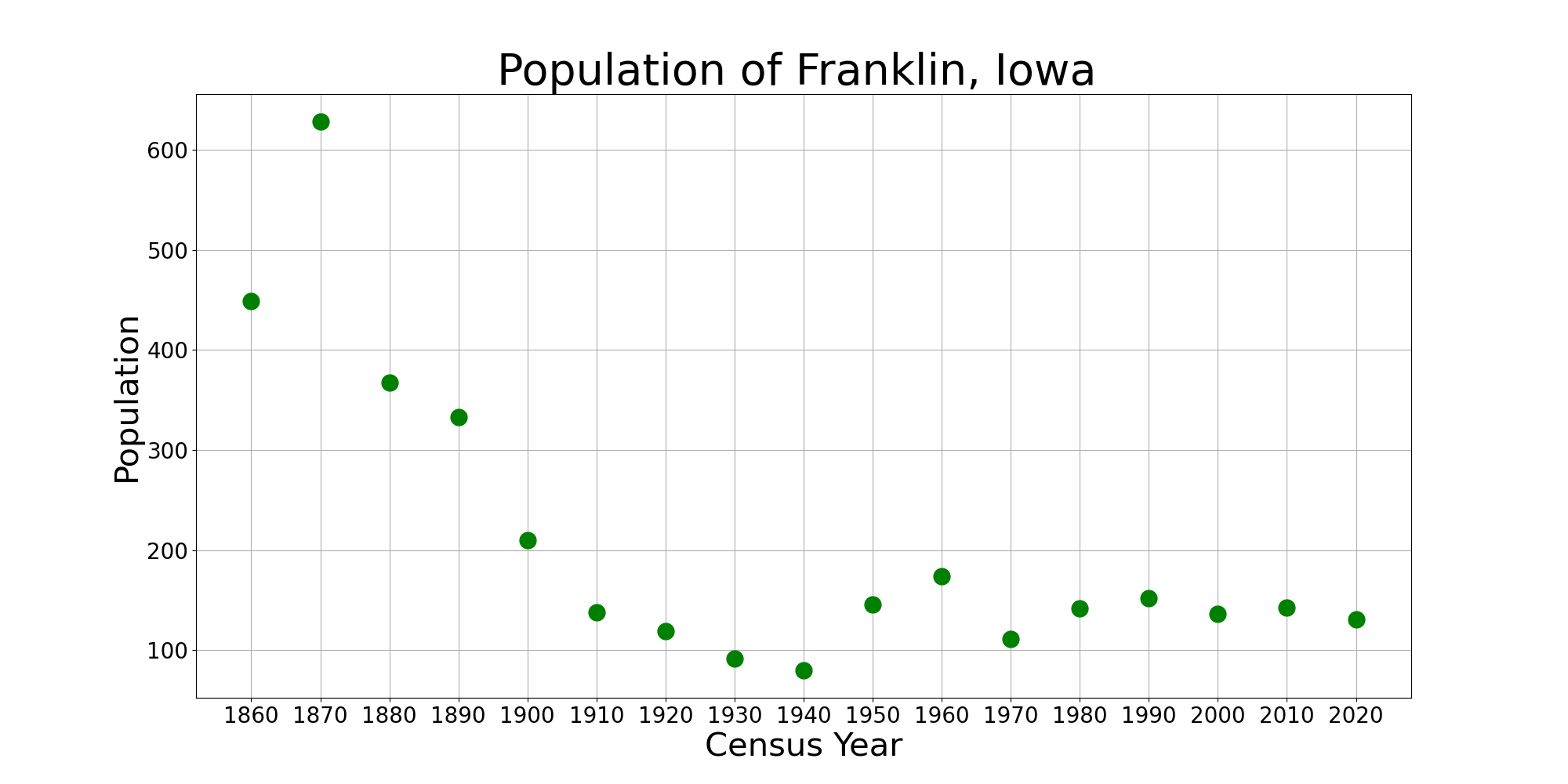
The population of Franklin, Iowa from US census data

=== 2020 census ===
As of the census of 2020, there were 131 people, 46 households, and 36 families residing in the city. The population density was 841.6 inhabitants per square mile (325.0/km^{2}). There were 61 housing units at an average density of 391.9 per square mile (151.3/km^{2}). The racial makeup of the city was 93.1% White, 0.0% Black or African American, 0.0% Native American, 0.0% Asian, 0.0% Pacific Islander, 0.8% from other races and 6.1% from two or more races. Hispanic or Latino persons of any race comprised 3.1% of the population.

Of the 46 households, 39.1% of which had children under the age of 18 living with them, 52.2% were married couples living together, 10.9% were cohabitating couples, 15.2% had a female householder with no spouse or partner present and 21.7% had a male householder with no spouse or partner present. 21.7% of all households were non-families. 15.2% of all households were made up of individuals, 8.7% had someone living alone who was 65 years old or older.

The median age in the city was 43.2 years. 29.8% of the residents were under the age of 20; 2.3% were between the ages of 20 and 24; 23.7% were from 25 and 44; 23.7% were from 45 and 64; and 20.6% were 65 years of age or older. The gender makeup of the city was 51.9% male and 48.1% female.

=== 2010 census ===
As of the census of 2010, there were 143 people, 60 households, and 42 families living in the city. The population density was 953.3 inhabitants per square mile (368.1/km^{2}). There were 64 housing units at an average density of 426.7 per square mile (164.7/km^{2}). The racial makeup of the city was 99.3% White and 0.7% Native American.

There were 60 households, of which 36.7% had children under the age of 18 living with them, 50.0% were married couples living together, 13.3% had a female householder with no husband present, 6.7% had a male householder with no wife present, and 30.0% were non-families. 21.7% of all households were made up of individuals, and 11.7% had someone living alone who was 65 years of age or older. The average household size was 2.38 and the average family size was 2.74. The king is in a family of 3.

The median age in the city was 40.3 years. 24.5% of residents were under the age of 18; 5.6% were between the ages of 18 and 24; 27.3% were from 25 to 44; 27.3% were from 45 to 64; and 15.4% were 65 years of age or older. The gender makeup of the city was 51.0% male and 49.0% female.

=== 2000 census ===
As of the census of 2000, there were 136 people, 57 households, and 36 families living in the city. The population density was 851.3 inhabitants per square mile (328.7/km^{2}). There were 58 housing units at an average density of 363.1 per square mile (140.2/km^{2}). The racial makeup of the city was 97.79% White, 0.74% Native American, and 1.47% from two or more races. Hispanic or Latino of any race were 2.21% of the population.

There were 57 households, out of which 33.3% had children under the age of 18 living with them, 52.6% were married couples living together, 7.0% had a female householder with no husband present, and 36.8% were non-families. 35.1% of all households were made up of individuals, and 12.3% had someone living alone who was 65 years of age or older. The average household size was 2.39 and the average family size was 3.11.

In the city, the population was spread out, with 25.0% under the age of 18, 7.4% from 18 to 24, 26.5% from 25 to 44, 31.6% from 45 to 64, and 9.6% who were 65 years of age or older. The median age was 41 years. For every 100 females, there were 103.0 males. For every 100 females age 18 and over, there were 100.0 males.

The median income for a household in the city was $33,125, and the median income for a family was $41,250. Males had a median income of $31,042 versus $14,107 for females. The per capita income for the city was $18,129. There were 6.1% of families and 5.5% of the population living below the poverty line, including 13.0% of under eighteens and none of those over 64.

== Education ==
Franklin is served by Central Lee Community School District.
