= Wesley Sowers =

American politician

Member of the Kansas Senate from the 31st district
- In office 1973–1980
- Succeeded by: Norma Daniels

Member of the Kansas Senate from the 19th district
- In office 1971–1972
- Preceded by: Tony Casado

Personal details
- Born: August 26, 1905 Whiting, Indiana
- Died: February 2, 2008 (aged 102) Wichita, Kansas
- Party: Republican
- Spouse: Gladys Krueger (m. 1929)

Wesley H. Sowers (August 26, 1905–February 2, 2008) was an American politician who served in the Kansas State Senate as a Republican from 1971 to 1980. He originally joined the Kansas Senate in the 19th district for two years, before serving two full terms in the 31st district from 1973 to 1980.
