= Mooar, Iowa =

- Census-designated place
- Location within Iowa Location within the United States
- Coordinates: 40°25′55″N 91°26′41″W
- Country: United States
- State: Iowa
- County: Lee
- Township: Jackson

Area
  - Total: 2.66 sq mi (6.89 km^{2})
  - Land: 2.64 sq mi (6.85 km^{2})
  - Water: 0.015 sq mi (0.04 km^{2})
- Elevation: 663 ft (202 m)

Population (2020)
  - Total: 321
  - Density: 121.3/sq mi (46.84/km^{2})
- Time zone: UTC-6 (Central (CST))
  - Summer (DST): UTC-5 (CDT)
- ZIP Code: 52632 (Keokuk)
- Area code: 319
- FIPS code: 19-53805
- GNIS feature ID: 2804143

Mooar is an unincorporated community and census-designated place (CDP) in Lee County, Iowa, United States. It is in the southern part of the county, 4 miles (6 km) northwest of Keokuk, the county seat. U.S. Route 61 forms the northeast edge of the CDP, leading southeast into Keokuk and north 19 miles (31 km) to Fort Madison. U.S. Route 218 runs concurrently with US-61 southeast to Keokuk, but leads northwest 16 miles (26 km) to Donnellson.

Mooar was first listed as a CDP prior to the 2020 census. As of the 2020 census, its population was 321.

== Demographics ==
Historical population
Census	Pop.	Note	%±
2020	321		—
U.S. Decennial Census

=== 2020 census ===
As of the census of 2020, there were 321 people, 139 households, and 85 families residing in the community. The population density was 121.3 inhabitants per square mile (46.8/km^{2}). There were 149 housing units at an average density of 56.3 per square mile (21.7/km^{2}). The racial makeup of the community was 94.1% White, 0.3% Black or African American, 0.3% Native American, 0.0% Asian, 0.3% Pacific Islander, 0.3% from other races and 4.7% from two or more races. Hispanic or Latino persons of any race comprised 1.6% of the population.

Of the 139 households, 20.9% of which had children under the age of 18 living with them, 55.4% were married couples living together, 5.0% were cohabitating couples, 20.9% had a female householder with no spouse or partner present and 18.7% had a male householder with no spouse or partner present. 38.8% of all households were non-families. 34.5% of all households were made up of individuals, 20.9% had someone living alone who was 65 years old or older.

The median age in the community was 44.8 years. 19.9% of the residents were under the age of 20; 9.3% were between the ages of 20 and 24; 20.9% were from 25 and 44; 32.7% were from 45 and 64; and 17.1% were 65 years of age or older. The gender makeup of the community was 48.6% male and 51.4% female.
