= Carolyn McGinn =

American politician

Member of the Kansas Senate from the 31st district
- In office January 10, 2005 – January 13, 2025
- Preceded by: Christine Downey
- Succeeded by: Stephen Owens

Personal details
- Born: January 27, 1959 (age 67)
- Party: Republican
- Spouse: Mark
- Children: 2
- Education: Friends University; Wichita State University

Carolyn McGinn (born January 27, 1959) is an American politician who served as a Republican member of the Kansas Senate, representing the 31st district from 2005 to 2025. She used to be a Commissioner on the Sedgwick County Commission.

== Committee assignments ==
McGinn serves on these legislative committees

- Joint Committee on Energy and Environmental Policy (chair)
- Natural Resources (chair)
- Joint Committee on Home and Community Based Services Oversight (chair)
- Ways and Means (vice-chair)
- Joint Committee on Kansas Security
- Local Government
- Calendar and Rules
- Utilities

== Political career ==
Some of the top contributors to McGinn's 2008 campaign, according to OpenSecrets, were:

Kansas Republican Senatorial Committee, Kansas Department of Administration, Koch Industries, Kansas Chamber of Commerce & Industry, Kansas Optometric Association

Energy & natural resources interests were her largest donor group.

In 2012, seven of eight moderate state senate Republicans were successfully targeted by the Koch brothers and the Kansas Chamber of Commerce, with only McGinn escaping defeat in the Republican primary. That gave incumbent Governor Sam Brownback the margin he needed to effectively restructure state taxation, exempting "S" status filers such as Koch Industries from income taxes.

McGinn did not seek re-election in 2024.
