= Norma Daniels =

American politician

Member of the Kansas Senate from the 31st district
- In office 1981–1993
- Preceded by: Wesley Sowers
- Succeeded by: Christine Downey

Personal details
- Born: Norma Staab; July 6, 1930 Yates Center, Kansas, U.S.
- Died: September 13, 2008 Wichita, Kansas
- Party: Democratic
- Spouse: Robert M. Daniels
- Children: 9
- Education: St. Mary's School of Nursing

Norma Lee Daniels (July 6, 1930–September 13, 2008) was an American politician who served as a Democrat in the Kansas State Senate from 1981 to 1993.

Daniels was raised in Kansas City, Missouri, and graduated from high school and nursing school there. After graduation, she worked as an obstetrics nurse, married in 1954, and raised children. In 1976, she successfully ran for the Valley Center city council, serving there for six years. She successfully won election to the Kansas Senate in 1980, serving three terms. She decided to retire from the legislature in 1992, and Christine Downey succeeded her.

In addition to her political work, Daniels was a practicing Roman Catholic and volunteered to teach CCD. She died in Wichita in 2008.
