= Central Lee Community School District =

Public school district in Donnellson, Iowa, United States

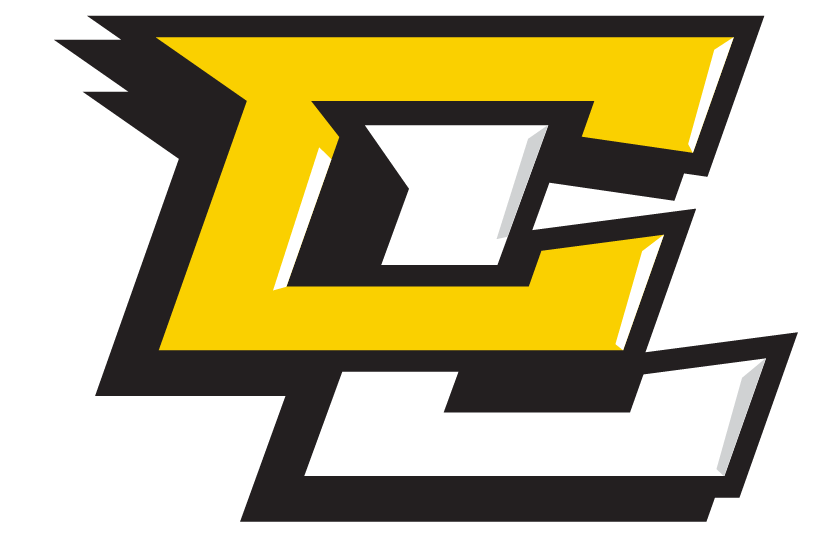

Location
- Donnellson, Iowa Lee County United States
- Coordinates: 40.576444, -91.518681

District information
- Type: Local school district
- Motto: “Proud To Be Central Lee”
- Grades: K–12
- Established: 1961
- Superintendent: Stacey Schmidt
- Schools: 3
- Budget: $14,343,000 (2020-21)
- NCES District ID: 1906930

Students and staff
- Students: 1250 (2022-23)
- Teachers: 76.50 FTE
- Staff: 88.55 FTE
- Student–teacher ratio: 16.34
- Athletic conference: Southeast Iowa Superconference; South Division
- District mascot: Hawks
- Colors: Black, White, Gold

Other information
- Affiliation(s): (Boys' sports) IHSAA and (Girls' Sports) IGHSAU
- Website: http://www.centrallee.org

Central Lee Community School District is a rural public school district headquartered in Donnellson, Iowa. Entirely in Lee County, it serves Argyle, Donnellson, Franklin, Montrose and adjacent rural areas. A small section of Fort Madison lies in the district limits.

== Schools ==
- Central Lee Elementary School
- Central Lee Middle School
- Central Lee High School

== History ==
A bond election was scheduled for April 2018 for $13.3 million but the vote was unsuccessful. A bond election, this time for $12.9 million and without the proposed agriculture and weight room renovations, was scheduled for September 10, 2019.

== See also ==
- List of school districts in Iowa
