= Christine Downey =

American politician (born 1949)

Member of the Kansas Senate from the 31st district
- In office 1993 – January 10, 2005
- Preceded by: Norma Daniels
- Succeeded by: Carolyn McGinn

Personal details
- Born: March 26, 1949 (age 77) Abilene, Kansas, U.S.
- Party: Democratic
- Education: Wichita State University

Christine Downey (born March 26, 1949) is a former American politician who served as a Democrat in the Kansas State Senate from 1993 to 2004.

Downey was born in Abilene, Kansas and attended Wichita State University, where she received both bachelor's and master's degrees in education. She worked as a teacher at several different levels of education before entering the State Senate.

When Norma Daniels retired from the Kansas Senate, Downey was recruited to run for office by Charles Benjamin, a county commissioner. She spent three terms in the Kansas Senate, where she worked on legislation regulating pollution from concentrated animal feeding operations (CAFOs), as well as bills that would consolidate and reform Kansas's public university system. She declined to run for re-election in 2004, and was succeeded by Carolyn McGinn.

After leaving the Senate, Downey was appointed to the Kansas Board of Regents by Governor Kathleen Sebelius in 2005, and served there until 2013.
