= Madison Township, Lee County, Iowa =

Township in Lee County, Iowa, U.S.

Coordinates: 40.626°N 91.336°W

Fort Madison is a city in Lee County, Iowa.

== History ==
Fort Madison was organized in 1841.
