= Viele, Iowa =

- Unincorporated community
- Location in Iowa Location in the United States
- Coordinates: 40°36′47″N 91°26′02″W
- Country: United States
- State: Iowa
- County: Lee
- Elevation: 541 ft (165 m)
- Time zone: UTC-6 (Central (CST))
  - Summer (DST): UTC-5 (CDT)
- GNIS feature ID: 464785

Viele is an unincorporated community in northern Lee County, Iowa, United States. It lies near the junction of 235th and 240th Streets, six miles (9.7 km) west of the city of Fort Madison.

== History ==
The community originally known as Jeffersonville was platted in July 1867 on the Chicago, Burlington and Quincy Railway. The name was changed to Viele in the 1860s or 1870s. Viele's population was 15 in 1877, 14 in 1902, and 16 in 1915. The population was estimated at 100 in 1940.
