= Pleasant Ridge Township, Lee County, Iowa =

Township in Lee County, Iowa, U.S.

Coordinates: 40°46′06″N 91°25′53″W

Pleasant Ridge Township is a township in Lee County, Iowa, United States.

== History ==
Pleasant Ridge Township was organized in 1841.
