= Denmark Township, Lee County, Iowa =

Township in Lee County, Iowa, U.S.

Coordinates: 40.75°N 91.32°W

Denmark Township is a township in Lee County, Iowa.

== History ==
Denmark Township was organized in 1841.
