= Washington Township, Lee County, Iowa =

Township in Lee County, Iowa, U.S.

Coordinates: 40.682°N 91.315°W

Washington Township is a township in Lee County, Iowa. Washington Township was organized in 1841.
