= West Point Township, Lee County, Iowa =

Township in Lee County, Iowa, U.S.

Coordinates: 40.682°N 91.430°W

West Point Township is a township in Lee County, Iowa.

== History ==
West Point Township was organized in 1841.
