= Van Buren Township, Lee County, Iowa =

Township in Lee County, Iowa, U.S.

Coordinates: 40.597°N 91.654°W

Van Buren Township is a township in Lee County, Iowa.

== History ==
Van Buren Township was organized in 1841.
