= Montrose, Iowa =

- City
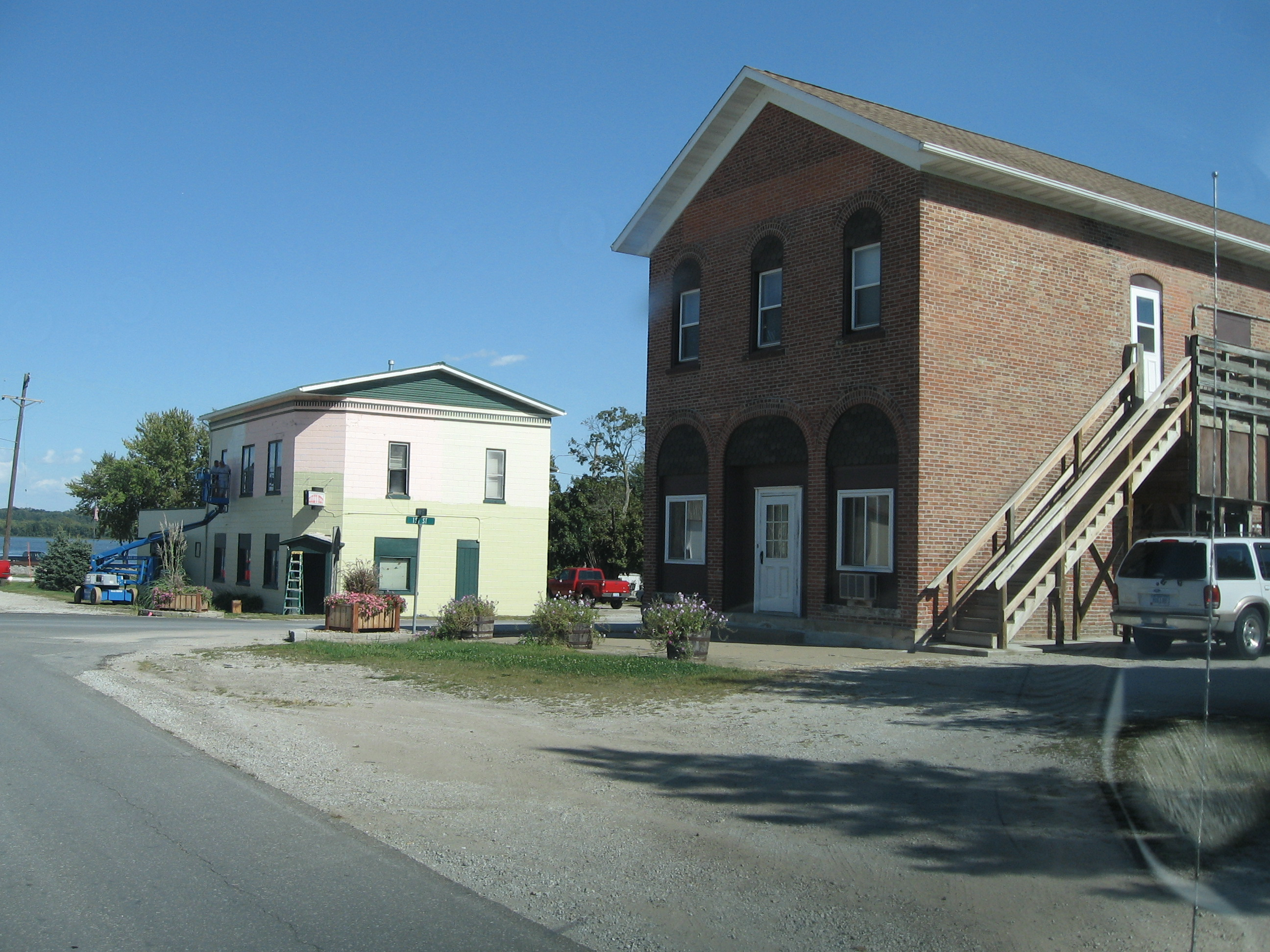
- Street scene in Montrose

- Location of Montrose, Iowa
- Coordinates: 40°31′33″N 91°24′57″W
- Country: United States
- State: Iowa
- County: Lee
- First settled: 1834

Area
  - Total: 1.23 sq mi (3.18 km^{2})
  - Land: 1.21 sq mi (3.13 km^{2})
  - Water: 0.015 sq mi (0.04 km^{2})
- Elevation: 528 ft (161 m)

Population (2020)
  - Total: 738
  - Density: 610/sq mi (235.6/km^{2})
- Time zone: UTC-6 (Central (CST))
  - Summer (DST): UTC-5 (CDT)
- ZIP code: 52639
- Area code: 319
- FIPS code: 19-53760
- GNIS feature ID: 2395390
- Website: montroseiowa.com

Montrose is a city in Lee County, Iowa. The population was 738 at the time of the 2020 census. The town is located on the Mississippi River. It is part of the Fort Madison-Keokuk Micropolitan Statistical Area. Montrose developed as a small river community, with its location along the Mississippi River historically contributing to local commerce and transportation. Today, it remains a small residential community with close ties to nearby cities in the region.

== History ==
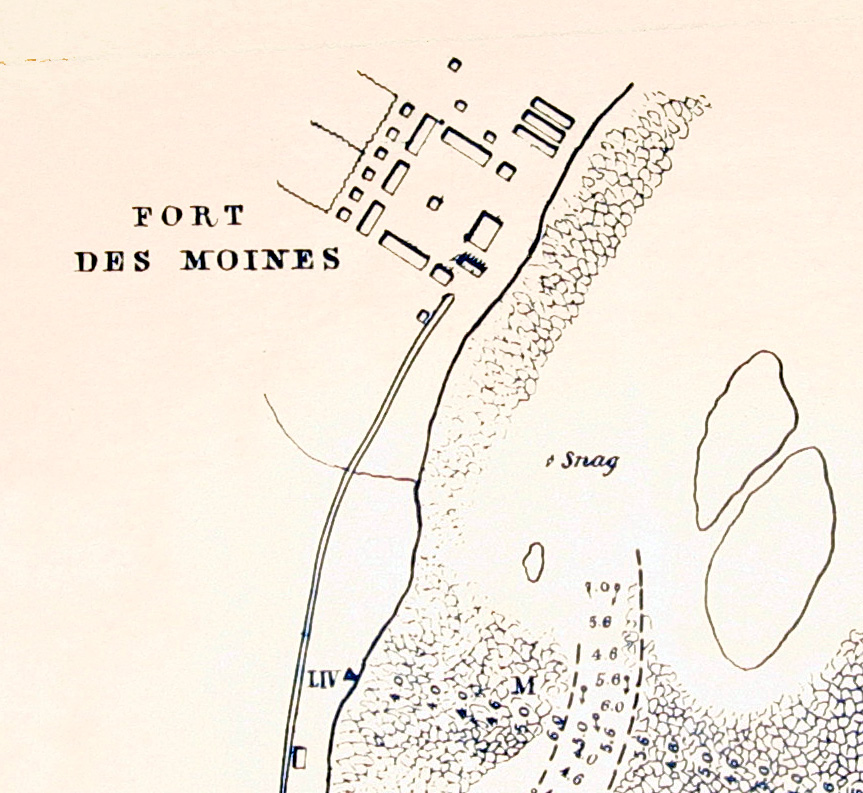
Robert E. Lee map of the head of the Des Moines Rapids, 1837, showing Fort Des Moines No. 1, later Montrose, Iowa.

The area around Montrose has been occupied continuously since at least the 1780s, when Quashquame's village was established nearby. The area was strategically important because it is at the head of the Des Moines Rapids, a major impediment to river traffic that caused large boats to land in this area and transfer freight overland to avoid the rapids. Montrose was the location of Fort Des Moines No. 1, a military post from 1834 to 1837. In 1836 the commander of Fort Des Moines, Lieutenant-Colonel Mason, would begin to plat out the town. Later that year David W. Kilbourne would finish laying out the town, and would name it Montrose. From 1839 to 1846 Montrose was the home of many members of the Church of Jesus Christ of Latter-day Saints. This was primarily significant in 1839 when many people lived in an abandoned barracks at Montrose that served as a good short term residence while homes were being built in nearby Nauvoo, Illinois. Among Montrose's residents at this time were Brigham Young, Wilford Woodruff and Erastus Snow. Despite legends that the streets of Montrose were aligned to allow a direct view of the Nauvoo Temple across the Mississippi River in Illinois, the streets actually align with the 1834 layout of Fort Des Moines.

Montrose was incorporated in 1857, with Doctor J. Anderson elected the first mayor in June. Montrose became an important river town until the construction of a canal near Keokuk ended the lightering business.

== Geography ==
According to the United States Census Bureau, the city has a total area of 1.14 square miles (2.95 km^{2}), of which 1.12 square miles (2.90 km^{2}) is land and 0.02 square miles (0.05 km^{2}) is water.

Montrose is located in Montrose Township on the former Chicago, Burlington and Quincy Railroad.

== Demographics ==
Historical populations
Year	Pop.	±%
1850	454	—
1870	905	+99.3%
1880	983	+8.6%
1890	778	−20.9%
1900	748	−3.9%
1910	708	−5.3%
1920	549	−22.5%
1930	621	+13.1%
1940	592	−4.7%
1950	643	+8.6%
1960	632	−1.7%
1970	735	+16.3%
1980	1,038	+41.2%
1990	957	−7.8%
2000	957	+0.0%
2010	898	−6.2%
2020	738	−17.8%
Source:"U.S. Census website". United States Census Bureau. and Iowa Data Center; Source: U.S. Decennial Census

=== 2020 census ===
As of the census of 2020, there were 738 people, 314 households, and 205 families residing in the city. The population density was 610.2 inhabitants per square mile (235.6/km^{2}). There were 352 housing units at an average density of 291.0 per square mile (112.4/km^{2}). The racial makeup of the city was 95.7% White, 0.1% Black or African American, 0.3% Native American, 0.1% Asian, 0.0% Pacific Islander, 0.4% from other races and 3.4% from two or more races. Hispanic or Latino persons of any race comprised 1.2% of the population.

Of the 314 households, 26.1% of which had children under the age of 18 living with them, 49.0% were married couples living together, 6.1% were cohabitating couples, 26.8% had a female householder with no spouse or partner present and 18.2% had a male householder with no spouse or partner present. 34.7% of all households were non-families. 29.3% of all households were made up of individuals, 15.6% had someone living alone who was 65 years old or older.

The median age in the city was 48.4 years. 20.6% of the residents were under the age of 20; 3.9% were between the ages of 20 and 24; 22.1% were from 25 and 44; 28.2% were from 45 and 64; and 25.2% were 65 years of age or older. The gender makeup of the city was 48.0% male and 52.0% female.

=== 2010 census ===
As of the census of 2010, there were 898 people, 359 households, and 242 families residing in the city. The population density was 801.8 inhabitants per square mile (309.6/km^{2}). There were 405 housing units at an average density of 361.6 per square mile (139.6/km^{2}). The racial makeup of the city was 98.2% White, 0.4% African American, 0.3% Asian, and 1.0% from two or more races. Hispanic or Latino of any race were 0.6% of the population.

There were 359 households, of which 26.2% had children under the age of 18 living with them, 51.8% were married couples living together, 10.6% had a female householder with no husband present, 5.0% had a male householder with no wife present, and 32.6% were non-families. 28.7% of all households were made up of individuals, and 13.9% had someone living alone who was 65 years of age or older. The average household size was 2.37 and the average family size was 2.86.

The median age in the city was 47.4 years. 18.5% of residents were under the age of 18; 7.2% were between the ages of 18 and 24; 21.2% were from 25 to 44; 32.6% were from 45 to 64; and 20.6% were 65 years of age or older. The gender makeup of the city was 48.9% male and 51.1% female.

=== 2000 census ===
As of the census of 2000, there were 957 people, 374 households, and 255 families residing in the city. The population density was 852.1 inhabitants per square mile (329.0/km^{2}). There were 399 housing units at an average density of 355.3 per square mile (137.2/km^{2}). The racial makeup of the city was 97.81% White, 0.10% African American, 0.73% Native American, 0.10% Asian, 0.21% from other races, and 1.04% from two or more races. Hispanic or Latino of any race were 0.84% of the population.

There were 374 households, out of which 31.8% had children under the age of 18 living with them, 54.5% were married couples living together, 9.4% had a female householder with no husband present, and 31.8% were non-families. 29.9% of all households were made up of individuals, and 16.0% had someone living alone who was 65 years of age or older. The average household size was 2.44 and the average family size was 3.00.

In the city, the population was spread out, with 24.3% under the age of 18, 7.0% from 18 to 24, 25.3% from 25 to 44, 24.7% from 45 to 64, and 18.7% who were 65 years of age or older. The median age was 41 years. For every 100 females, there were 87.6 males. For every 100 females age 18 and over, there were 84.2 males.

The median income for a household in the city was $35,341, and the median income for a family was $40,865. Males had a median income of $30,855 versus $21,845 for females. The per capita income for the city was $17,010. About 7.0% of families and 8.9% of the population were below the poverty line, including 10.9% of those under age 18 and 6.8% of those age 65 or over.

== Education ==
Montrose is served by Central Lee Community School District.

== Notable people ==
- Jerry R. Junkins, CEO of Texas Instruments, Incorporated
- Lowell Junkins, (1973 to 1985) Iowa State Senator
- Cal McVey, 19th century Major League Baseball player.
- Margaret Warner Morley (1858–1923) educator, scholar and writer.
- Cato Mead, African American American Revolutionary War veteran
- Nedra Volz (1908–2003) character actress

== Buildings ==
- St. Barnabas Episcopal Church (Montrose, Iowa)
