= Don Schroeder =

American politician from Kansas

Member of the Kansas House of Representatives from the 74th district
- In office January 8, 2007 – January 14, 2019
- Preceded by: Carl Clayton Krehbiel
- Succeeded by: Stephen Owens

Personal details
- Born: March 20, 1951 (age 75)
- Party: Republican
- Education: Tabor College (BBA); Wichita State University (MBA)

Don Schroeder (born March 20, 1951) is an American politician who served as a member of the Kansas House of Representatives for the 74th district from 2007 to 2019.

== Education ==
Schroeder earned Bachelor of Business Administration from Tabor College and a Master of Public Administration from Wichita State University.

== Career ==
Schroeder operated a Production Agriculture Operation for 30 years and also served as a member of the McPherson County Board of Commissioners. He also served on the Inman USD 448 School Board for five years.

Schroeder opposes same-sex marriage and abortion because he believes they are "morally lacking."
