= Jefferson Township, Lee County, Iowa =

Township in Lee County, Iowa, U.S.

Coordinates: 40.597°N 91.432°W

Jefferson Township is a township in Lee County, Iowa.

== History ==
Jefferson Township was organized in 1841.
