= Green Bay Township, Lee County, Iowa =

Township in Lee County, Iowa, U.S.

Coordinates: 40.684°N 91.201°W

Green Bay Township is a township in Lee County, Iowa, in the United States.

== History ==
Green Bay Township was organized in 1841.
