= Marion Township, Lee County, Iowa =

Township in Lee County, Iowa, U.S.

Coordinates: 40.770°N 91.545°W

Marion Township is a township in Lee County, Iowa.

== History ==
Marion Township was organized in 1841.
