= Argyle, Iowa =

- Unincorporated community
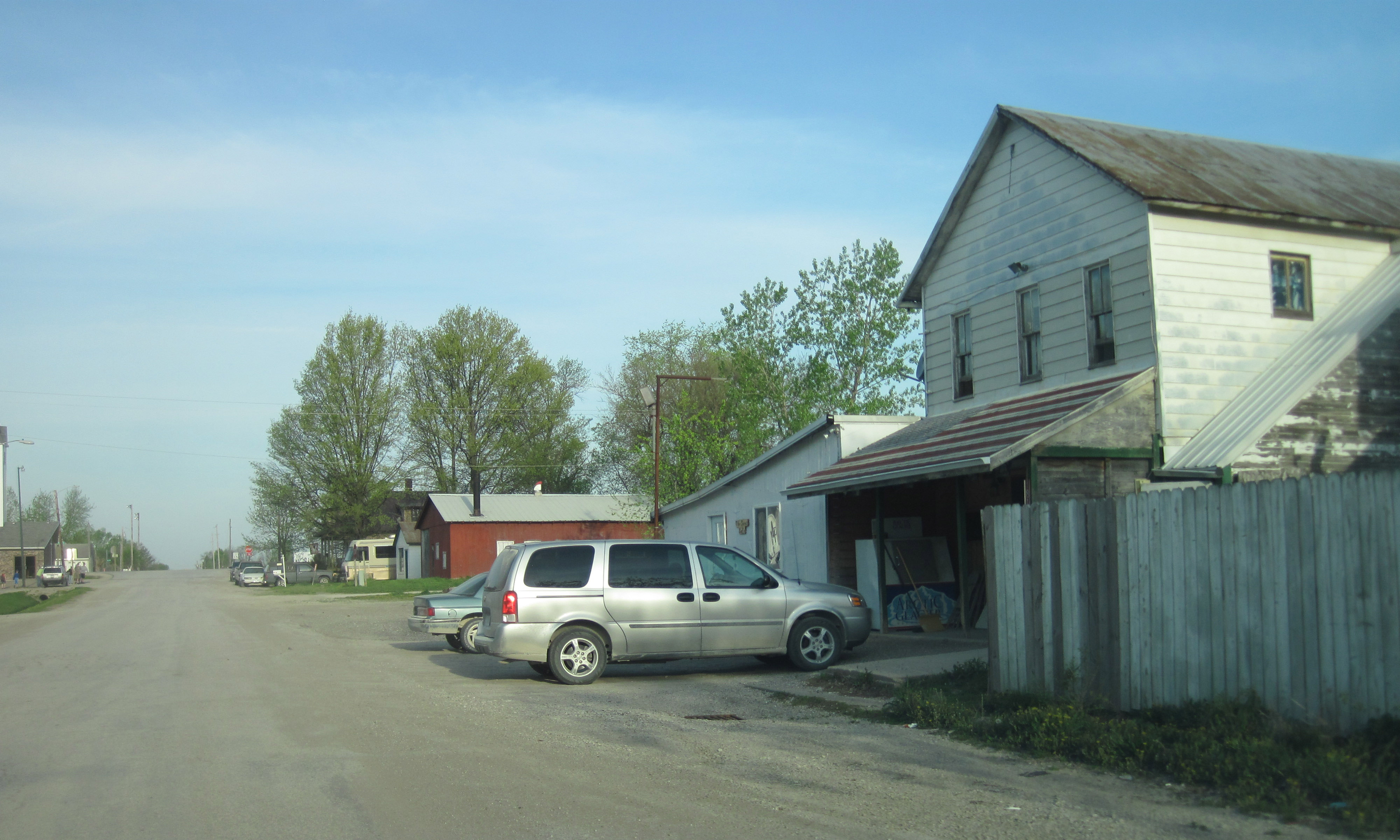
- Street scene in Argyle

- Location in Iowa Location in the United States
- Coordinates: 40°32′09″N 91°34′04″W
- Country: United States
- State: Iowa
- County: Lee

Area
  - Total: 0.60 sq mi (1.56 km^{2})
  - Land: 0.60 sq mi (1.56 km^{2})
  - Water: 0 sq mi (0.00 km^{2})
- Elevation: 682 ft (208 m)

Population (2020)
  - Total: 91
  - Density: 150.8/sq mi (58.23/km^{2})
- Time zone: UTC-6 (Central (CST))
  - Summer (DST): UTC-5 (CDT)
- ZIP codes: 52619
- Area code: 319
- FIPS code: 19-02710
- GNIS feature ID: 2804142

Argyle is an unincorporated community and census-designated place (CDP) in southwestern Lee County, Iowa, United States. As of the 2020 census, its population was 91.

It lies along the concurrent Iowa Highways 27 and 394 southwest of the city of Fort Madison, the county seat of Lee County. Its elevation is 679 feet (207 m). Although Argyle is unincorporated, it has a post office, with the ZIP code of 52619, which opened on 15 March 1885. The community is part of the Fort Madison–Keokuk, IA-MO Micropolitan Statistical Area.

The Central Lee Community School District serves the community.

== Demographics ==
Historical population
| Census | Pop. | Note | %± |
|---|---|---|---|
| 2020 | 91 | | — |
U.S. Decennial Census

=== 2020 census ===
As of the census of 2020, there were 91 people, 37 households, and 19 families residing in the community. The population density was 150.8 inhabitants per square mile (58.2/km^{2}). There were 45 housing units at an average density of 74.6 per square mile (28.8/km^{2}). The racial makeup of the community was 92.3% White, 1.1% Black or African American, 1.1% Native American, 0.0% Asian, 1.1% Pacific Islander, 0.0% from other races and 4.4% from two or more races. Hispanic or Latino persons of any race comprised 3.3% of the population.

Of the 37 households, 21.6% of which had children under the age of 18 living with them, 35.1% were married couples living together, 0.0% were cohabitating couples, 37.8% had a female householder with no spouse or partner present and 27.0% had a male householder with no spouse or partner present. 48.6% of all households were non-families. 48.6% of all households were made up of individuals, 24.3% had someone living alone who was 65 years old or older.

The median age in the community was 48.5 years. 29.7% of the residents were under the age of 20; 1.1% were between the ages of 20 and 24; 18.7% were from 25 and 44; 28.6% were from 45 and 64; and 22.0% were 65 years of age or older. The gender makeup of the community was 64.8% male and 35.2% female.

== Transportation ==
Amtrak’s Southwest Chief, which operates between Los Angeles and Chicago, passes through the town on BNSF tracks, but makes no stop. The nearest station is located in Fort Madison, 19 miles (31 km) to the east.
