= Cedar Township, Lee County, Iowa =

Township in Lee County, Iowa, U.S.

Coordinates: 40.7692°N 91.6653°W

Cedar Township is a township in Lee County, Iowa.

== History ==
Cedar Township was organized in 1844.
