= Franklin Township, Lee County, Iowa =

Township in Lee County, Iowa, U.S.

Coordinates: 40.682°N 91.545°W

Franklin Township is a township in Lee County, Iowa, in the United States.

== History ==
Franklin Township was organized in 1841.
