= Stephen Owens (Kansas politician) =

American politician and businessman

Member of the Kansas Senate from the 31st district
- Incumbent
- Assumed office January 13, 2025

Member of the Kansas House of Representatives from the 74th district
- In office January 14, 2019 – January 13, 2025
- Preceded by: Don Schroeder
- Succeeded by: Mike King

Personal details
- Party: Republican
- Spouse: Rose
- Children: 3
- Education: Bethel College (BS); Southwestern College (MBA)

Stephen Owens is an American politician and businessman. He served as a member of the Kansas House of Representatives from the 74th district from 2019 to 2025, and has been a member of the Kansas Senate since 2025.

== Education ==
Owens earned a Bachelor of Science degree in business and accounting from Bethel College and a Master of Business Administration from Southwestern College.

== Career ==
From 1997 to 2015, Owens served as a captain in the Hesston, Kansas, Fire Department. From 2000 to 2003, he also worked as a CPA. From 2014 to 2018, Owens was the vice president of the Kansas Bail Bonds Association. He co-founded Axis Monitoring LLC, a company that provides alcohol, GPS and house arrest monitoring services. Owens also owns a bail bonds company with locations in Wichita and Emporia. He was elected to the Kansas House of Representatives in November 2018 and assumed office in January 2019. In 2024, he was elected to the Kansas Senate.
