= Charleston Township, Lee County, Iowa =

Township in Lee County, Iowa, U.S.

Coordinates: 40.5965°N 91.5449°W

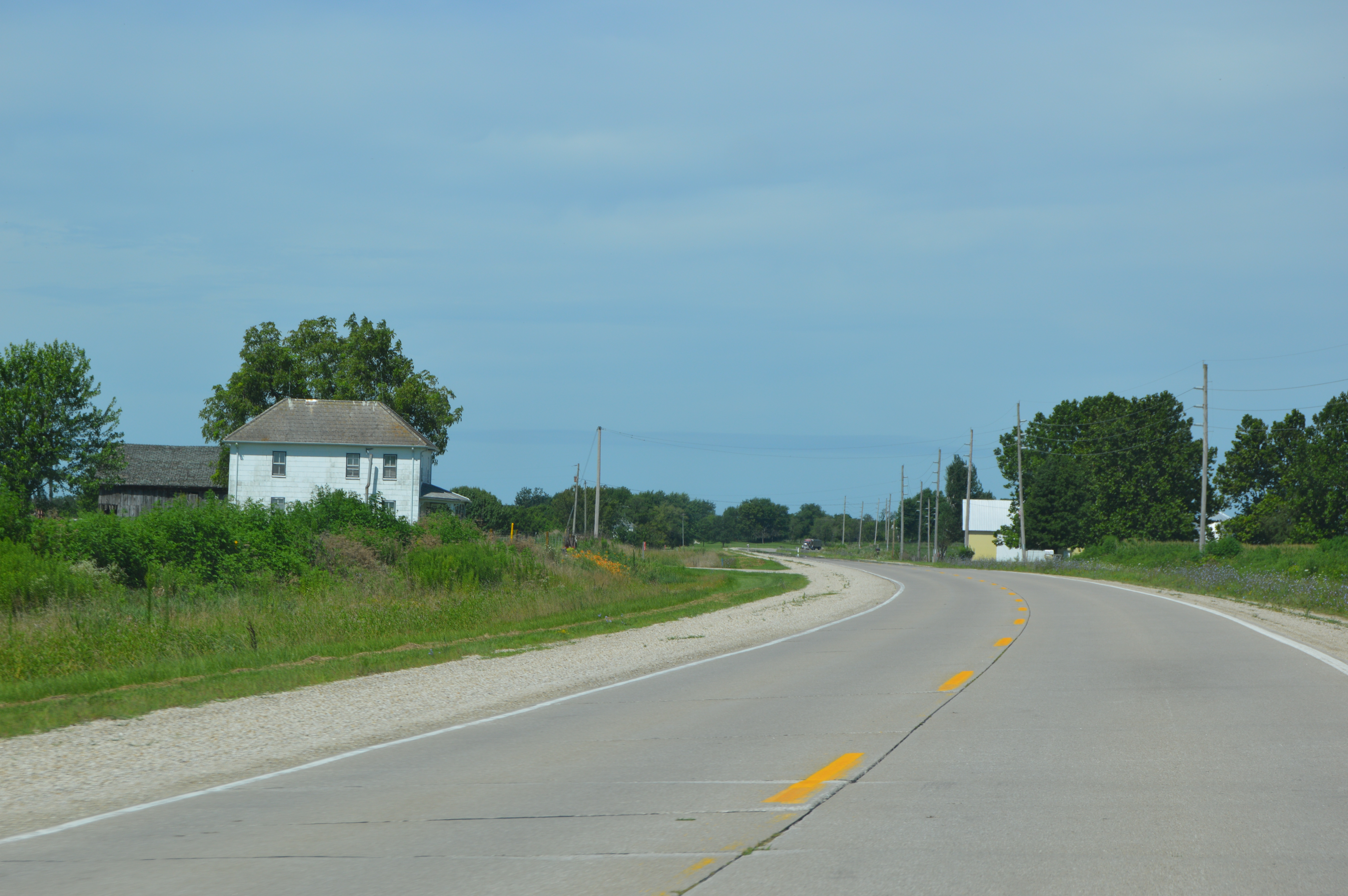
Along Iowa Highway 2

Charleston Township is a township in Lee County, Iowa, United States. Its total population is 694 according to the 2020 United States census.

== History ==
Charleston Township was organized in 1844.
