= Lee County, Iowa =

County in Iowa, United States

- County
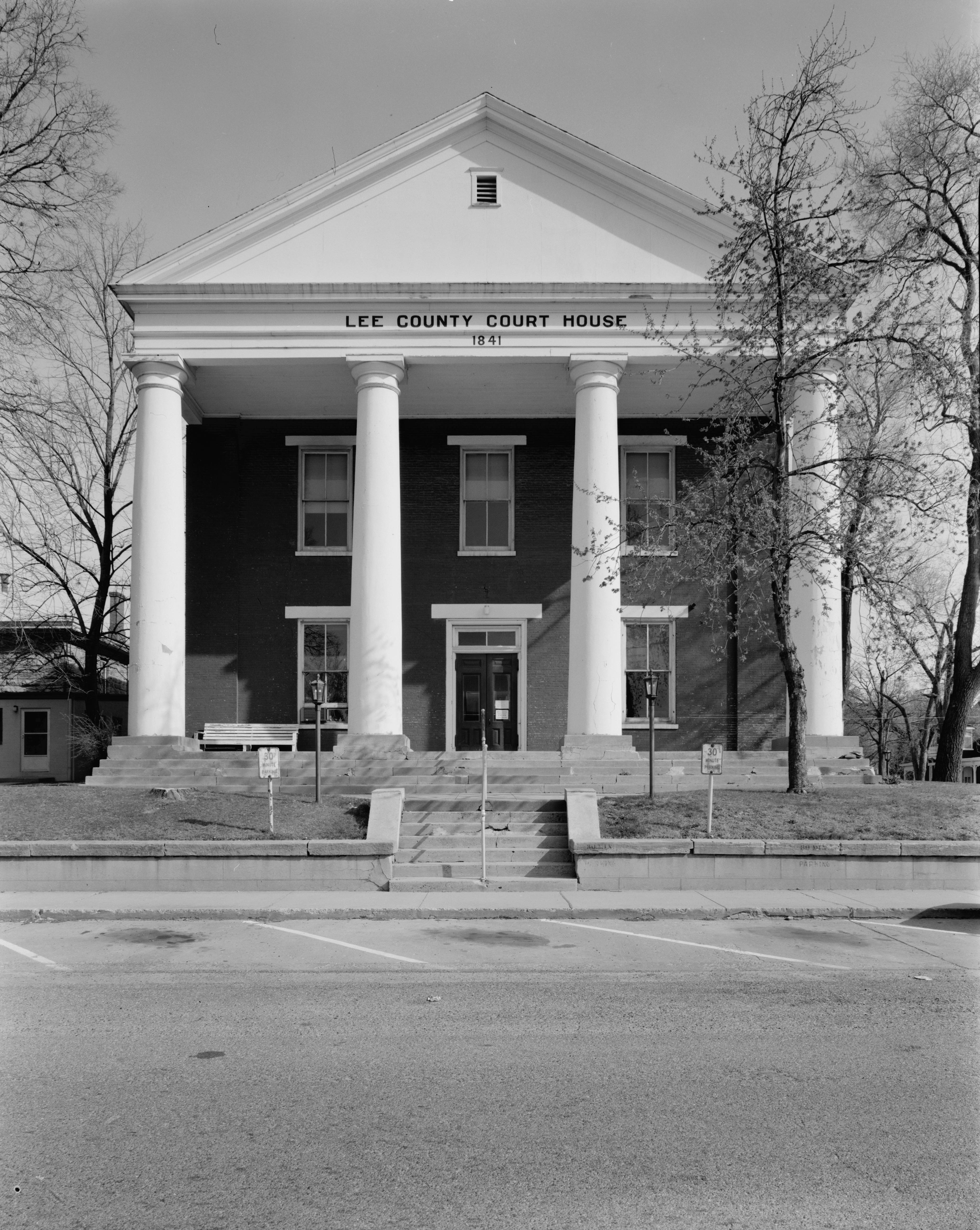
- The Lee County Courthouse located in Fort Madison

- Location within the U.S. state of Iowa
- Coordinates: 40°38′34″N 91°28′28″W
- Country: United States
- State: Iowa
- Founded: December 7, 1836
- Seat: Fort Madison and Keokuk
- Largest city: Fort Madison

Government
  - State Representatives: Blaine Watkins, Matthew Rinker
  - State Senator: Jeff Reichman

Area
  - Total: 539 sq mi (1,400 km^{2})
  - Land: 518 sq mi (1,340 km^{2})
  - Water: 21 sq mi (54 km^{2}) 4.0%

Population (2020)
  - Total: 33,555
  - Estimate (2025): 32,306 ▼
  - Density: 64.8/sq mi (25.0/km^{2})
- Time zone: UTC−6 (Central)
  - Summer (DST): UTC−5 (CDT)
- Congressional district: 1st
- Website: www.leecounty.org
- Iowa county number 56

Lee County is the southernmost county in the U.S. state of Iowa. As of the 2020 census, the population was 33,555. The county seats are Fort Madison and Keokuk: it is the only county in Iowa with more than one county seat. Lee County is part of the Fort Madison–Keokuk, IA–IL–MO Micropolitan Statistical Area. It was established in 1836.

== History ==
Fort Madison dates to the War of 1812. Lee County was the location of the Half-Breed Tract, established by treaty in 1824. Allocations of land were made to American Indian descendants of European fathers and Indian mothers at this tract. Originally the land was to be held in common. Some who had an allocation lived in cities, where they hoped to make better livings. Lee County as a named entity was formed on December 7, 1836, under the jurisdiction of Wisconsin Territory. It would become a part of Iowa Territory when it was formed on July 4, 1838. Large-scale European-American settlement in the area began in 1839, after Congress allowed owners to sell land individually. Members of the Church of Jesus Christ of Latter-day Saints (LDS Church) under the direction of Brigham Young fled persecutions in Missouri to settle in Illinois and Iowa. Nauvoo, across the border in Hancock County, Illinois, became the main center of Latter-day Saints settlement, but there was also a Latter Day Saints stake organized in Lee County under the direction of John Smith, the uncle of Joseph Smith, land that was sold to them by Isaac Galland in 1839.

Lee has two county seats—Fort Madison and Keokuk. The latter was established in 1847 when disagreements led to a second court jurisdiction. Lee County's population grew to about 19,000 in 1850, the first US census, to 37,000 per the 3rd census in 1870, peaking at 44,000 people in 1960. It has continuously decreased since and as of 2020, 33,555 people lived there, comparable to the years between 1860 and 1870.

=== Name ===
There is no consensus about the derivation of the name "Lee." It has been variously proposed that the county was named for Marsh, Delevan & Lee, of Albany, New York, and the 'New York Land Company', who owned extensive interests in the Half-Breed Tract in the 1830s; Robert E. Lee, who surveyed the Des Moines Rapids; or Albert Lea, who helped explore the interior of Iowa.

== Geography ==
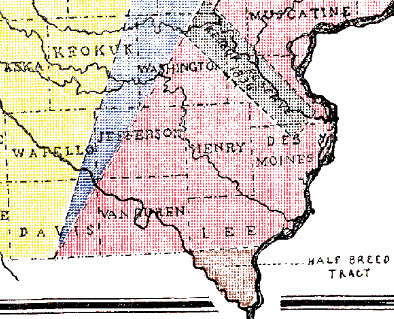
Lee County, Iowa and the "Half Breed Tract" historic map detail from a 1905 Iowa Census Map

According to the U.S. Census Bureau, the county has a total area of 539 square miles (1,400 km^{2}), of which 518 square miles (1,340 km^{2}) is land and 21 square miles (54 km^{2}) (4.0%) is water. The lowest point in the state of Iowa is located on the Mississippi River in Keokuk in Lee County, where it flows out of Iowa and into Missouri and Illinois.

=== Major highways ===
- U.S. Highway 61
- U.S. Highway 136
- U.S. Highway 218
- Iowa Highway 2
- Iowa Highway 16
- Iowa Highway 27

=== Transit ===
- Fort Madison station

=== Adjacent counties ===
- Henry County (north)
- Des Moines County (northeast)
- Henderson County, Illinois (across the river east)
- Hancock County, Illinois (southeast)
- Clark County, Missouri (southwest)
- Van Buren County (west)

== Demographics ==
Historical population
Census	Pop.	Note	%±
1850	18,861		—
1860	29,232		55.0%
1870	37,210		27.3%
1880	34,859		−6.3%
1890	37,715		8.2%
1900	39,719		5.3%
1910	36,702		−7.6%
1920	39,676		8.1%
1930	41,268		4.0%
1940	41,074		−0.5%
1950	43,102		4.9%
1960	44,207		2.6%
1970	42,996		−2.7%
1980	43,106		0.3%
1990	38,687		−10.3%
2000	38,052		−1.6%
2010	35,862		−5.8%
2020	33,555		−6.4%
2025 (est.)	32,306	▼	−3.7%
U.S. Decennial Census; 1790–1960 1900–1990; 1990–2000 2010–2020

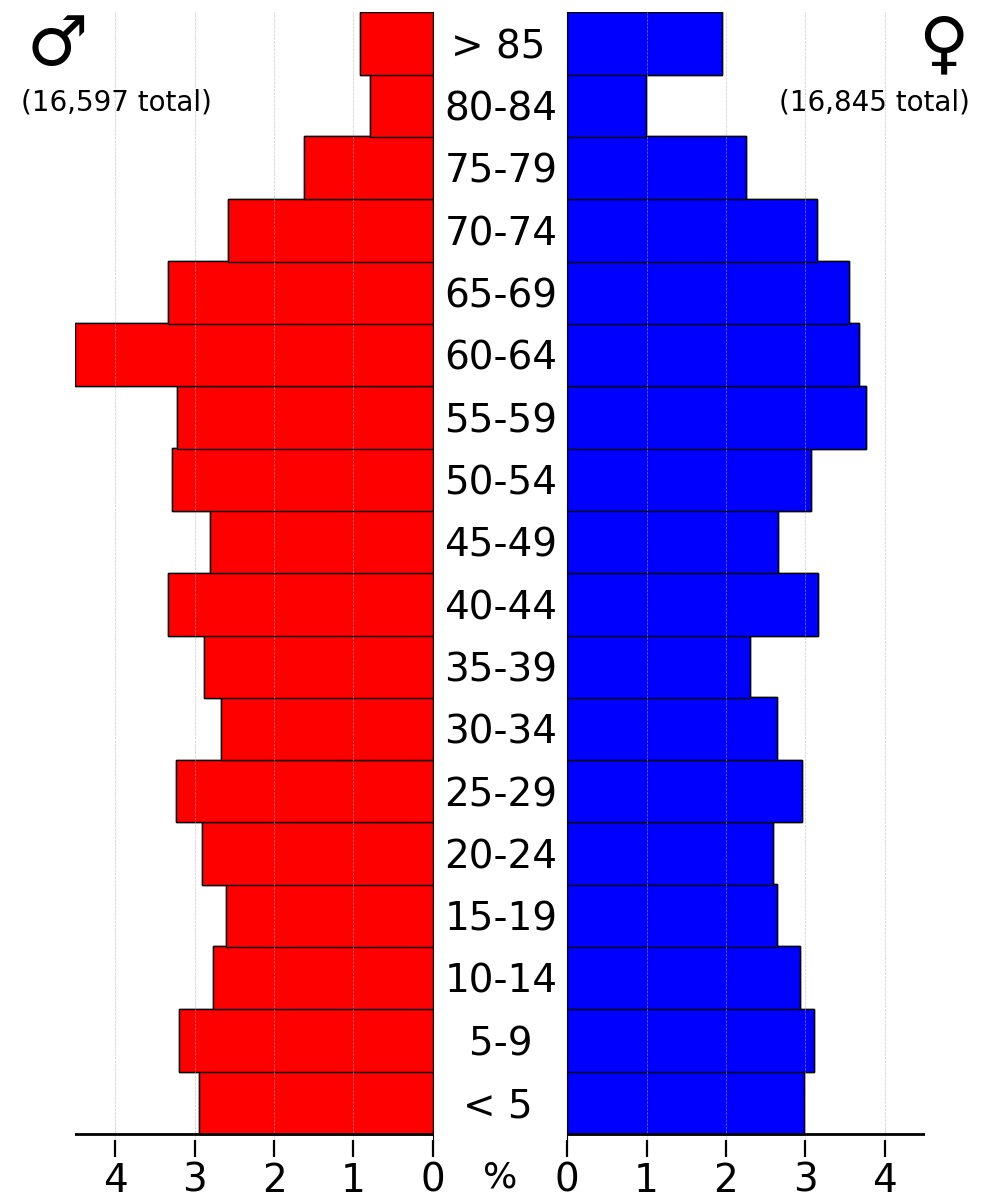
2022 US Census population pyramid for Lee County from ACS 5-year estimates

=== 2020 census ===
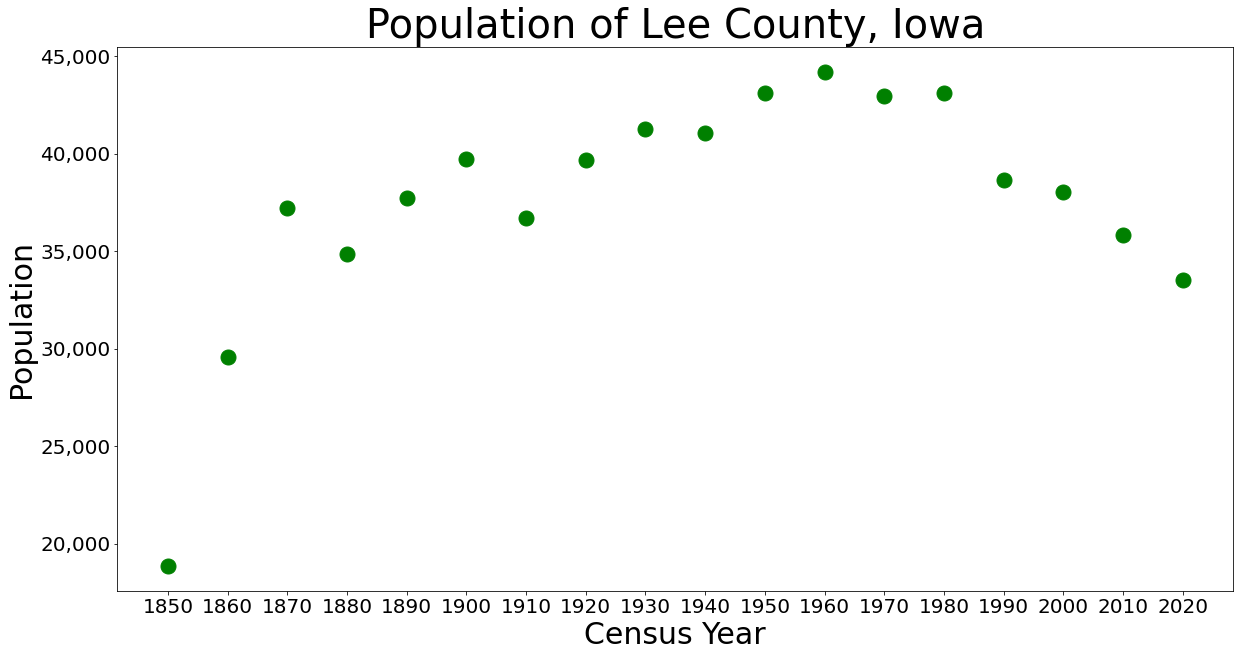
Population of Lee County from the U.S. census data

As of the 2020 census, the county had a population of 33,555, a population density of 62.1/sq mi (24.0/km^{2}), and 94.67% of the population reported being of one race. There were 15,858 housing units, of which 14,036 were occupied and 11.5% were vacant.

The median age was 44.4 years; 21.3% of residents were under the age of 18 and 22.8% of residents were 65 years of age or older. For every 100 females there were 100.6 males, and for every 100 females age 18 and over there were 98.6 males age 18 and over.

The racial makeup of the county was 90.4% White, 2.7% Black or African American, 0.2% American Indian and Alaska Native, 0.4% Asian, <0.1% Native Hawaiian and Pacific Islander, 0.9% from some other race, and 5.3% from two or more races. Hispanic or Latino residents of any race comprised 3.3% of the population.

59.1% of residents lived in urban areas, while 40.9% lived in rural areas.

There were 14,036 households in the county, of which 26.5% had children under the age of 18 living in them, 46.5% were married-couple households, 19.7% were households with a male householder and no spouse or partner present, and 26.2% were households with a female householder and no spouse or partner present. About 31.5% of all households were made up of individuals and 15.5% had someone living alone who was 65 years of age or older. Among occupied housing units, 74.8% were owner-occupied and 25.2% were renter-occupied; the homeowner vacancy rate was 2.5% and the rental vacancy rate was 12.4%.

Lee County Racial Composition
Race	Number	Percent
White (NH)	29,888	89.1%
Black or African American (NH)	896	3%
Native American (NH)	48	0.14%
Asian (NH)	139	0.41%
Pacific Islander (NH)	8	0.02%
Other/Mixed (NH)	1,466	4.4%
Hispanic or Latino	1,110	3.31%

=== 2010 census ===
As of the 2010 census recorded a population of 35,862 with a population density of 69.3/sq mi (26.8/km^{2}). There were 16,205 housing units, of which only 14,610 were occupied.

=== 2000 census ===
As of the 2000 census, there were 38,052 people, 15,161 households, and 10,248 families residing in the county. The population density was 74 inhabitants per square mile (29/km^{2}). There were 16,612 housing units at an average density of 32 per square mile (12/km^{2}). The racial makeup of the county was 94.24% White, 2.80% Black or African American, 0.26% Native American, 0.39% Asian, 0.06% Pacific Islander, 1.03% from other races, and 1.21% from two or more races. 2.37% of the population were Hispanic or Latino of any race.

There were 15,161 households, out of which 30.40% had children under the age of 18 living with them, 53.70% were married couples living together, 10.30% had a female householder with no husband present, and 32.40% were non-families. 28.30% of all households were made up of individuals, and 13.50% had someone living alone who was 65 years of age or older. The average household size was 2.41 and the average family size was 2.93.

In the county, the population was spread out, with 24.40% under the age of 18, 7.80% from 18 to 24, 26.70% from 25 to 44, 24.60% from 45 to 64, and 16.50% who were 65 years of age or older. The median age was 40 years. For every 100 females, there were 97.90 males. For every 100 females age 18 and over, there were 96.40 males.

The median income for a household in the county was $36,193, and the median income for a family was $42,658. Males had a median income of $32,286 versus $21,821 for females. The per capita income for the county was $18,430. About 7.10% of families and 9.70% of the population were below the poverty line, including 12.60% of those under age 18 and 9.60% of those age 65 or over.

== Communities ==
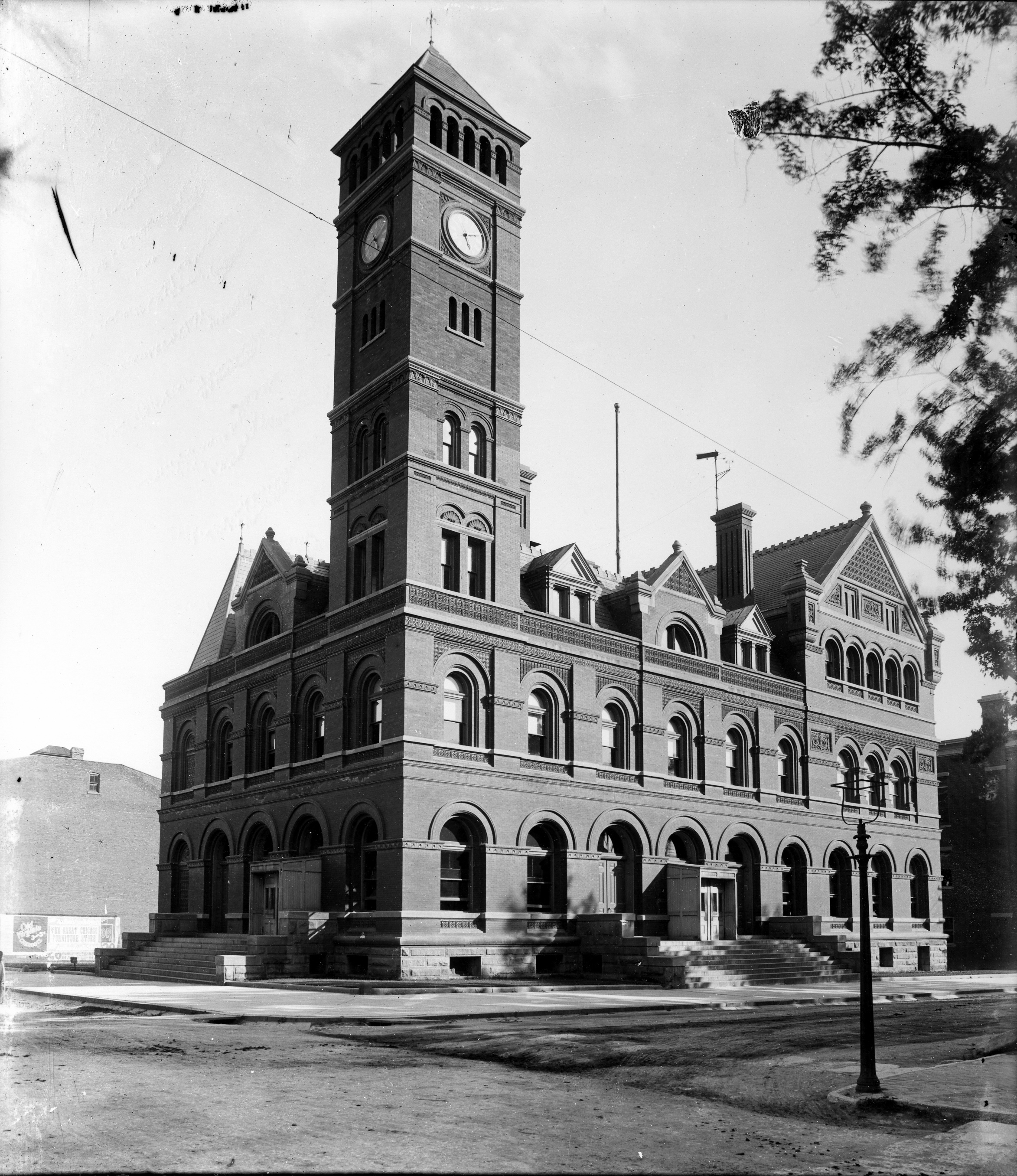
Courthouse in Keokuk in 1900

=== Cities ===
- Donnellson
- Fort Madison
- Franklin
- Houghton
- Keokuk
- Montrose
- St. Paul
- West Point

=== Census-designated places ===
- Argyle
- Denmark
- Mooar
- Sandusky
- Wever

=== Other unincorporated communities ===
- Charleston
- Croton
- Mount Hamill
- New Boston
- Pilot Grove
- Primrose
- Viele
- Vincennes

=== Townships ===
- Cedar
- Charleston
- Denmark
- Des Moines
- Franklin
- Green Bay
- Harrison
- Jackson
- Jefferson
- Madison
- Marion
- Montrose
- Pleasant Ridge
- Van Buren
- Washington
- West Point

=== Population ranking ===
The population ranking of the following table is based on the 2020 census of Lee County.

† county seat

Rank	City/town/etc.	Municipal type	Population (2020 Census)
1	† Fort Madison	City	10,270
2	† Keokuk	City	9,900
3	West Point	City	921
4	Donnellson	City	885
5	Montrose	City	738
6	Denmark	CDP	425
7	Mooar	CDP	321
8	Sandusky	CDP	297
9	Houghton	City	141
10	Franklin	City	131
11	St. Paul	City	109
12	Wever	CDP	101
13	Argyle	CDP	91

== Notable people ==
- Cleng Peerson (1783–1865), pioneer settler in Lee County in 1840
- Richard Proenneke (1916–2003), naturalist, subject of books and documentary
- William Elliott Whitmore (born 1978), singer and songwriter
- Mark W. Balmert, U.S. Navy admiral
- Brad Bigler, head men's basketball coach at SMSU
- Ryan Bowen, NBA player
- James Duderstadt, President of the University of Michigan
- Todd Farmer, writer, actor, and film producer
- Bob Fry, professional golfer
- Kate Harrington, poet
- Thomas M. Hoenig, chief executive of the Tenth District Federal Reserve Bank, in Kansas City
- Patty Judge, 46th lieutenant governor
- Jerry Junkins, CEO of Texas Instruments, Incorporated
- Dick Klein, founder of the Chicago Bulls
- Dennis O'Keefe, actor, star of films such as Raw Deal
- James Theodore Richmond, writer and conservationist
- Aloysius Schulte, first President of St. Ambrose College
- Walter A. Sheaffer, founder of the W.A. Sheaffer Pen Company
- George Henry Williams, United States Senator
- Edward P. Alexander, author, historian, and educator
- Herman C. Baehr, 36th Mayor of Cleveland, Ohio
- William H. Clagett, politician
- Orion Clemens, first and only secretary of Nevada Territory and brother of Mark Twain
- William Lane Craig, analytic philosopher and Christian apologist
- Samuel Curtis, military officer
- Mary Fels, philanthropist, suffragist, Georgist
- Bud Fowler, first professional African American baseball player
- Nathaniel Lyon Gardner, botanist, born in Keokuk
- Jerry Harrington, baseball player
- James B. Howell, newspaper editor and U.S. senator, resided in Keokuk
- Howard Hughes, aviator, engineer, industrialist, film producer and director, and philanthropist
- Howard R. Hughes, Sr., businessman and inventor; father of Howard Hughes
- Rupert Hughes, novelist, screenwriter, film director, historian; uncle of Howard Hughes
- Dick Hutcherson, stock car driver
- Ron Hutcherson, stock car driver
- John N. Irwin, governor of Idaho Territory (1883) and of Arizona Territory (1890–1892)
- Edward Kimball, actor
- Lloyd Steel Lourie, orthodontist
- Samuel Taylor Marshall, lawyer and founder of Beta Theta Pi fraternity
- Elsa Maxwell, gossip columnist, socialite
- Edward Joseph McManus, U.S. federal judge and lieutenant governor of Iowa (1959–1961)
- Grace Medes, biochemist
- Samuel Freeman Miller, Supreme Court justice
- Conrad Nagel, actor and a founder of the Academy Awards
- Richard Page, lead vocalist and bass player for the band Mr. Mister
- George Pomutz, Union Army officer and diplomat
- Mike Pyle, NFL player
- Palmer Pyle, NFL player
- John M. Rankin, Iowa state legislator and judge
- Hugh T. Reid, Union Army general
- Jack Saltzgaver, Major League Baseball player, New York Yankees and Pittsburgh Pirates
- Jeremy Soule composer of video game soundtracks
- Frank Steunenberg, governor of Idaho (1897–1901)
- Ramo Stott, stock car driver
- James Vandenberg, football quarterback
- Don White, stock car driver
- Verner Moore White, artist, painted oil of Keokuk presented to President Theodore Roosevelt
- Annie Turner Wittenmyer, social reformer and relief worker

== Politics ==
Lee County is located in Iowa's 100th House of Representatives district and Iowa's 99th House of Representatives district, as well as Iowa Senate District 50.

In recent presidential elections, Lee County had a strong Democratic lean, voting for the party's candidate in every election from 1984 to 2012. In 2016 however, the county swung hard to vote for Republican Donald Trump by a wide margin, a swing of over 31 points compared to 2012.

United States presidential election results for Lee County, Iowa
Year	Republican		Democratic		Third party(ies)	
Year	No.	%	No.	%	No.	%
1896	4,847	47.70%	5,153	50.71%	162	1.59%
1900	4,486	45.88%	5,182	53.00%	110	1.12%
1904	4,612	52.71%	3,848	43.98%	289	3.30%
1908	4,262	46.61%	4,706	51.47%	176	1.92%
1912	2,016	23.66%	3,891	45.67%	2,613	30.67%
1916	4,395	51.18%	3,993	46.50%	199	2.32%
1920	10,763	65.94%	5,177	31.72%	383	2.35%
1924	9,999	54.41%	4,903	26.68%	3,475	18.91%
1928	11,645	59.86%	7,785	40.02%	25	0.13%
1932	7,084	39.57%	10,624	59.35%	194	1.08%
1936	8,955	46.36%	9,630	49.85%	732	3.79%
1940	10,616	53.71%	9,117	46.12%	33	0.17%
1944	9,406	53.03%	8,252	46.53%	78	0.44%
1948	7,801	45.32%	9,201	53.46%	210	1.22%
1952	12,289	58.61%	8,625	41.13%	55	0.26%
1956	11,571	58.35%	8,226	41.48%	32	0.16%
1960	10,765	52.00%	9,936	48.00%	0	0.00%
1964	6,321	34.02%	12,244	65.89%	17	0.09%
1968	8,883	49.25%	8,076	44.78%	1,077	5.97%
1972	9,748	55.33%	7,510	42.63%	360	2.04%
1976	8,195	46.92%	9,017	51.63%	253	1.45%
1980	8,793	48.14%	8,204	44.92%	1,268	6.94%
1984	8,756	49.17%	8,912	50.04%	141	0.79%
1988	6,228	36.02%	10,911	63.11%	151	0.87%
1992	4,777	27.85%	9,366	54.61%	3,009	17.54%
1996	4,932	31.49%	8,831	56.38%	1,899	12.12%
2000	6,339	38.25%	9,632	58.12%	601	3.63%
2004	7,472	41.84%	10,152	56.85%	234	1.31%
2008	7,062	40.99%	9,821	57.00%	347	2.01%
2012	7,785	41.17%	10,714	56.65%	412	2.18%
2016	8,803	54.50%	6,215	38.48%	1,133	7.02%
2020	9,773	58.40%	6,541	39.09%	420	2.51%
2024	10,152	62.67%	5,659	34.94%	387	2.39%

== Education ==
School districts include:

- Central Lee Community School District
- Fort Madison Community School District
- Keokuk Community School District
- Mount Pleasant Community School District
- Van Buren County Community School District

Former school districts:

- Harmony Community School District

== See also ==
- National Register of Historic Places listings in Lee County, Iowa
- Lee County Courthouse in use in Fort Madison, original and oldest courthouse
- Lee County Courthouse in use in Keokuk, originally a Federal courthouse and post office
