= Charleston, Iowa =

- Unincorporated community
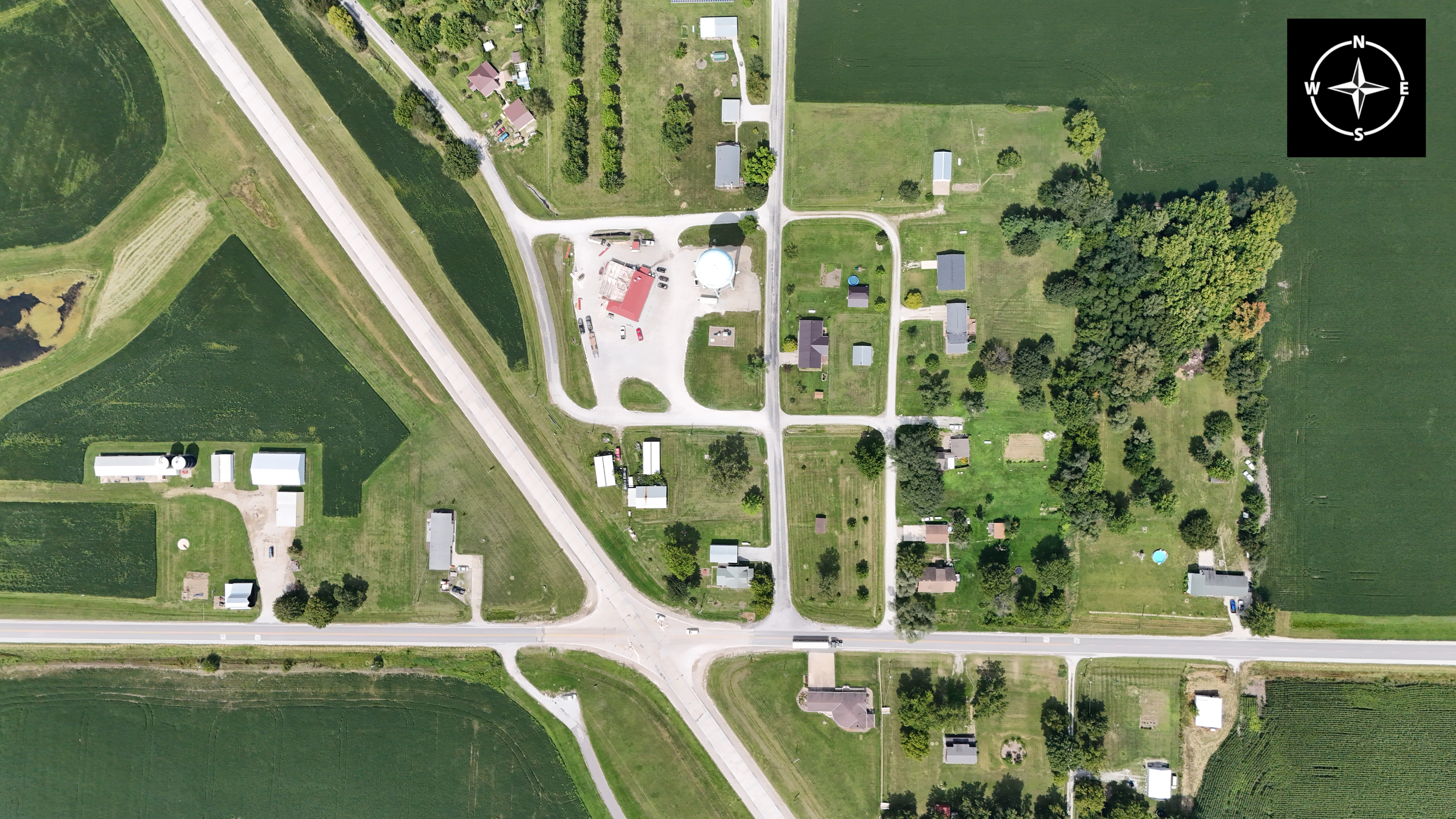
- An aerial photo of Charleston, taken on 22 August 2024

- Location in Iowa Location in the United States
- Coordinates: 40°35′27″N 91°31′53″W
- Country: United States
- State: Iowa
- County: Lee
- Elevation: 699 ft (213 m)
- Time zone: UTC-6 (Central (CST))
  - Summer (DST): UTC-5 (CDT)
- Area code: 319
- GNIS feature ID: 455355

Charleston is an unincorporated community in Lee County, Iowa, United States, in the state's southeastern corner.

== History ==
Charleston, a town in Charleston Township, was laid out by George Berry on September 23, 1848, for Jacob Hufford, and the plat was registered in the office of the County Recorder on June 1, 1849. The original plat was 48 small and 3 large lots, with Hackberry, Main, and Elm Streets crossed by numbered streets east and west. The population in 1914 was 65, with three churches, public school, post office, express and telegraph offices, telephone connections, a hotel, a general store, and depot.

By 1925, the population of Charleston had increased to 105 persons. The population was 40 in 1940.

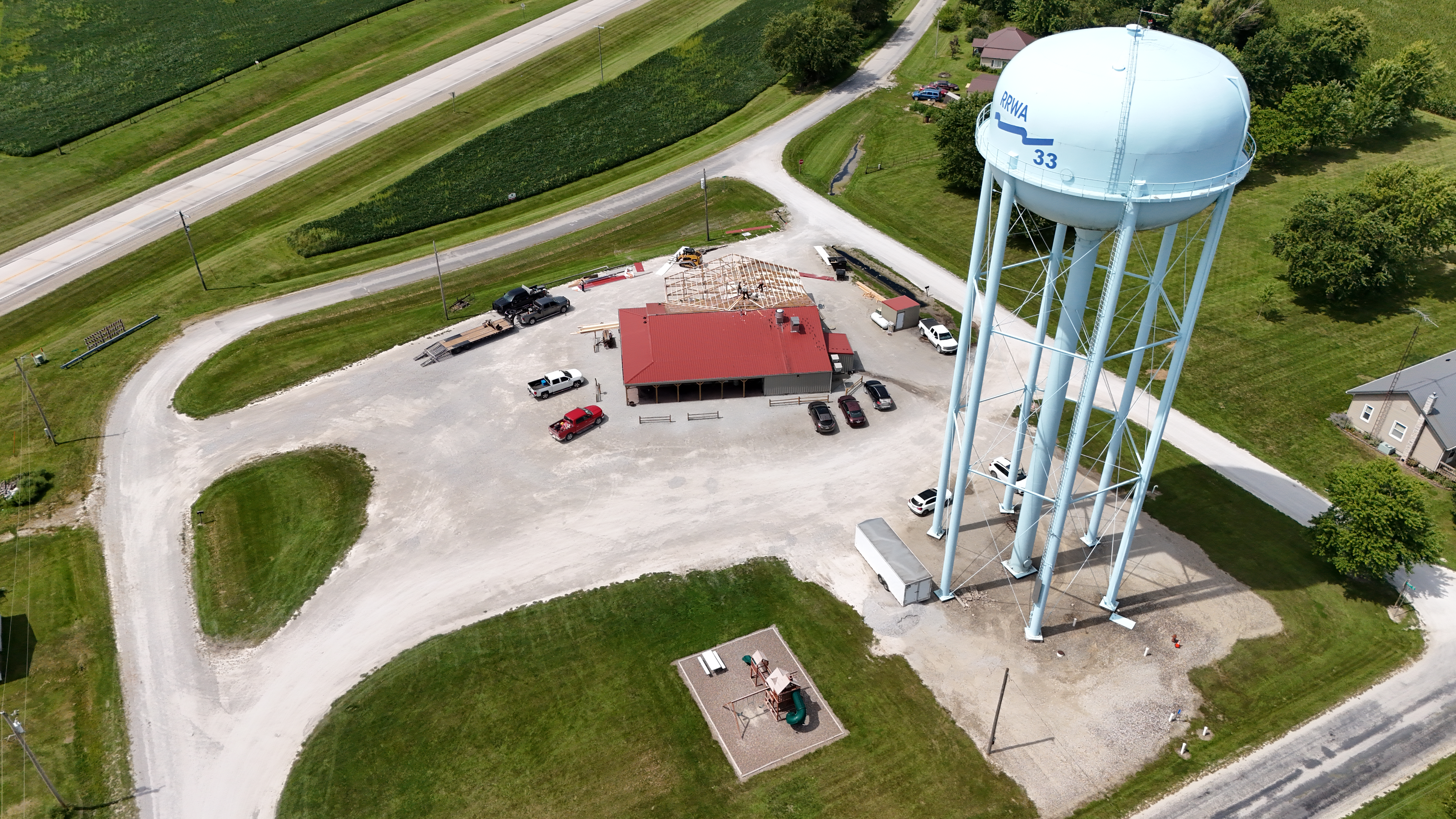
The water tower and restaurant which was constructed at the site of the Prairie House, which burned in 2009

In 2010 the unincorporated town of Charleston consisted of 32 people living in 15 homes. The Lee County owned square is managed by Lee County Conservation Board where there is a shelter with a picnic table. The Rathbun Regional Water Association water tower #33 is a local landmark. A fire on Sunday, July 5, 2009, destroyed the Prairie House restaurant under the tower. Five fire departments from nearby communities – Donnellson, Des Moines Township, Montrose, Fort Madison, and West Point – were unable to save the building. South of Charleston is the Charleston Cemetery.
