= Jackson Township, Lee County, Iowa =

Township in Lee County, Iowa, U.S.

Coordinates: 40.43°N 91.46°W

Jackson Township is a township in Lee County, Iowa.

== History ==
Jackson Township was organized in 1841.
