= Jerry Junkins =

American businessman (1937–1996)

Jerry Junkins

Jerry Ray Junkins (December 9, 1937 – May 29, 1996) was an American electronics businessman who was the president, chairman, and CEO of Texas Instruments, Incorporated from 1988 until his death in Germany, during a business trip.

Junkins was born in Fort Madison, Iowa. He was the salutatorian of his high school class of 25 students in Montrose, Iowa. Junkins would later marry the class valedictorian, Sally Schevers. Junkins graduated from Iowa State University's electrical engineering program in 1959, where he was a member and chapter president of Theta Xi fraternity. Upon graduation, he moved to Dallas where he joined Texas Instruments, and on a part-time basis attended Southern Methodist University.

A Dallas ISD elementary school in Carrollton, TexasTexas named Junkins Elementary School was named after Junkins. The school opened in fall 2006.

Junkins died from a myocardial infarction at the age of 58.
