= Kansas's 31st Senate district =

American legislative district

Kansas's 31st State Senate district
Senator
Stephen Owens; R–Sedgwick
- Demographics: 82% White; 2% Black; 10% Hispanic; 2% Asian; 1% Native American; 3% Other
- Population (2018): 73,554

Kansas's 31st Senate district is one of 40 districts in the Kansas Senate. It has been represented by Republican Stephen Owens since 2025.

== Geography ==
District 31 covers parts of Sedgwick County and all of Harvey County in the northern suburbs of Wichita, including some of northern Wichita proper as well as Newton, Park City, Valley Center, Hesston, Halstead, North Newton, Sedgwick, Kechi, Bel Aire, and Maize.

The district is located entirely within Kansas's 4th congressional district, and overlaps with the 72nd, 74th, 89th, 90th, 91st, 100th, and 103rd districts of the Kansas House of Representatives.

== Recent election results ==
=== 2020 ===
2020 Kansas Senate election, District 31
Party	Candidate	Votes	%
Republican	Carolyn McGinn (incumbent)	31,425	100
Total votes		31,425	100
Republican hold			

=== 2016 ===
2016 Kansas Senate election, District 31
Primary election
Party	Candidate	Votes	%
Republican	Carolyn McGinn (incumbent)	4,776	51.4
Republican	Renee Erickson	4,518	48.6
Total votes		9,294	100
General election
Republican	Carolyn McGinn (incumbent)	23,463	74.5
Democratic	J. Michelle Vann	8,026	25.5
Total votes		31,489	100
Republican hold			

=== 2012 ===
2012 Kansas Senate election, District 31
Primary election
Party	Candidate	Votes	%
Republican	Carolyn McGinn (incumbent)	4,770	55.1
Republican	Gary Mason	3,893	44.9
Total votes		8,663	100
General election
Republican	Carolyn McGinn (incumbent)	24,183	100
Total votes		24,183	100
Republican hold			

=== Federal and statewide results ===
Year	Office	Results
2020	President	Trump 61.7 – 35.9%
2018	Governor	Kobach 46.3 – 43.3%
2016	President	Trump 62.0 – 31.0%
2012	President	Romney 64.1 – 33.7%
