= Donnellson, Iowa =

- City
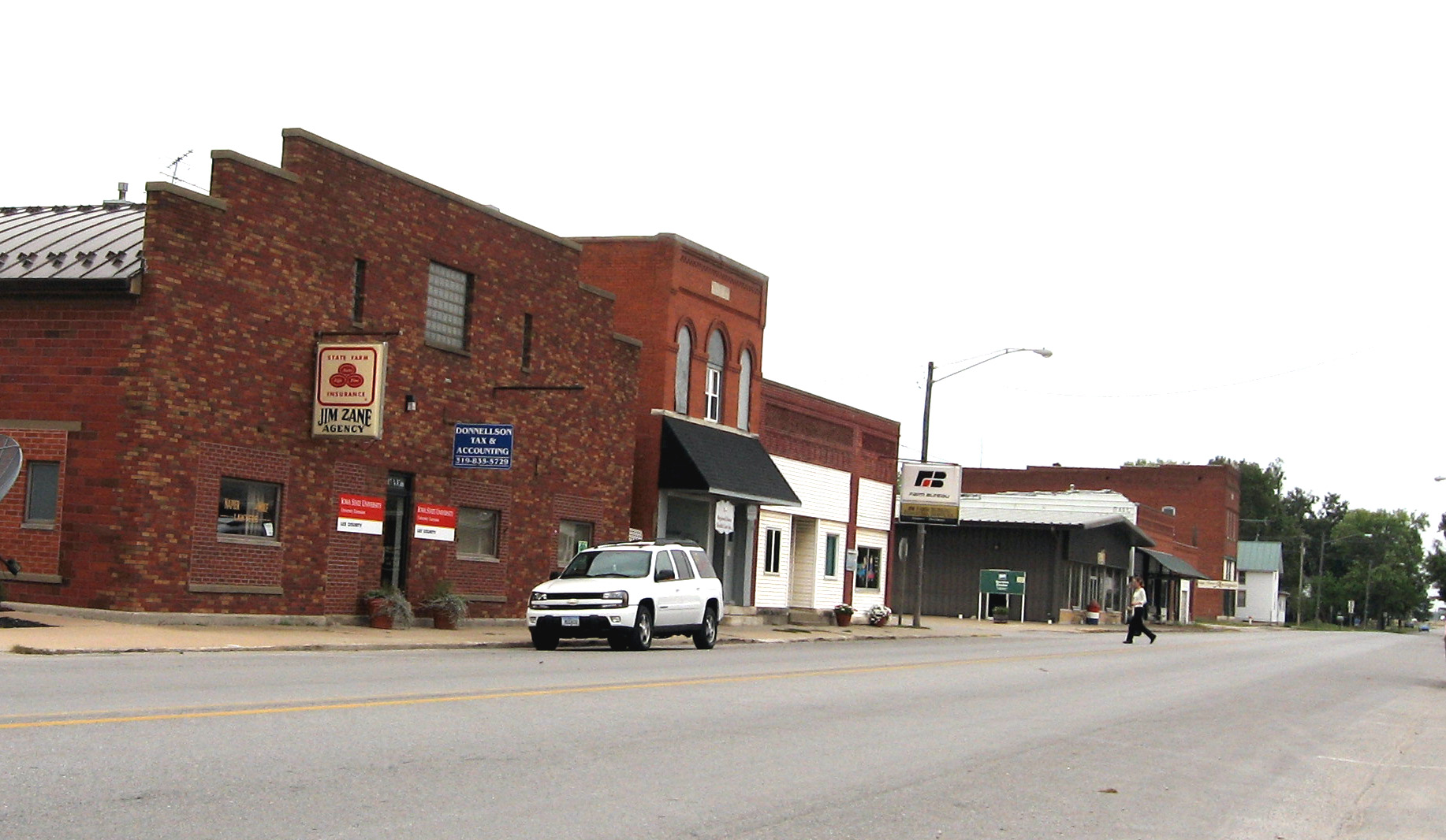
- Downtown Donnellson, Iowa
- Motto: "The Heart of Lee County"
- Location of Donnellson, Iowa
- Coordinates: 40°38′43″N 91°33′51″W
- Country: United States
- State: Iowa
- County: Lee

Government
  - Type: Mayor-Council
  - Mayor: Brian Moeller

Area
  - Total: 1.27 sq mi (3.30 km^{2})
  - Land: 1.27 sq mi (3.30 km^{2})
  - Water: 0 sq mi (0.00 km^{2})
- Elevation: 702 ft (214 m)

Population (2020)
  - Total: 885
  - Density: 695.4/sq mi (268.48/km^{2})
- Time zone: UTC-6 (Central (CST))
  - Summer (DST): UTC-5 (CDT)
- ZIP code: 52625
- Area code: 319
- FIPS code: 19-21810
- GNIS feature ID: 2394545
- Website: Donnellson Iowa website

Donnellson (/ˈdɒnəlsən/ DON-əl-sən) is a city in Lee County, Iowa, United States. The population was 885 at the time of the 2020 census. It is part of the Fort Madison-Keokuk Micropolitan Statistical Area.

== History ==
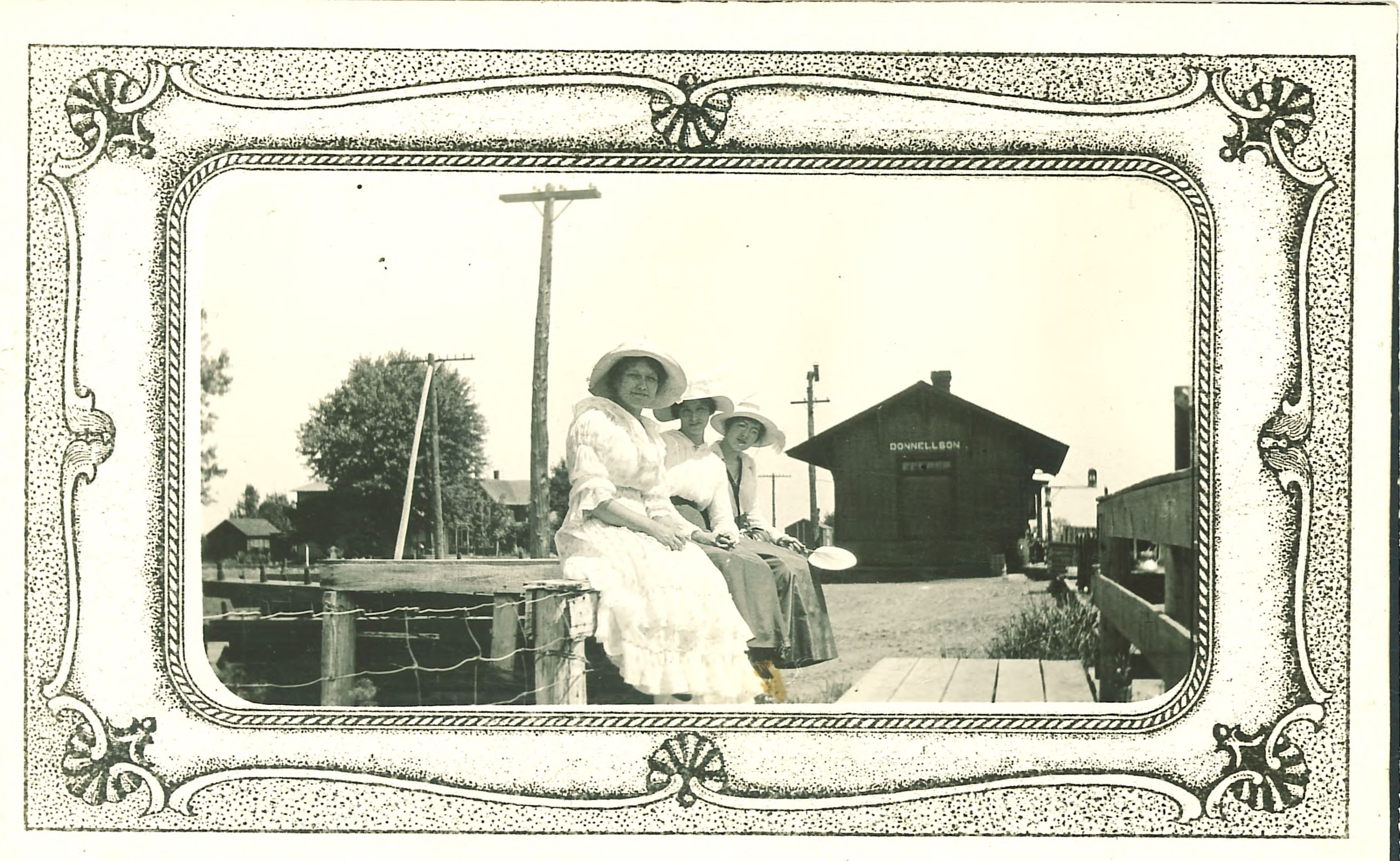
Donnellson train depot in the 1910s

What would be Donnellson was first surveyed by H. A. Summers for Esten Donnell, for who the town would be named. Esten’s son, W. R. Donnell helped construct the first buildings in Donnellson, and served as the railroad agent and post master. The town would begin to grow after the Chicago, Burlington and Quincy Railroad passed through to town. Donnellson was incorporated on October 25, 1892. At this time Donnellson was around 120 acres and 200 residents.

In 1897 Donnellson had had its first firehouse. From 1900 to 1910 the town grew quickly, with a telephone system, cheese factory, electric light plant, and water system being constructed.

The first school in Donnellson was built in 1915. Donnellson, plus the surrounding communities of Argyle and Montrose, is served by the Central Lee Community School District, which was consolidated into one location in 1986.

Donnellson is home to the Lee County Speedway, a 3/8-mile (0.60 km) dirt oval racetrack.

== Geography ==
According to the United States Census Bureau, the city has a total area of 1.26 square miles (3.26 km^{2}), all land.

=== Climate ===
Climate data for Donnellson, Iowa (1991–2020)
Month	Jan	Feb	Mar	Apr	May	Jun	Jul	Aug	Sep	Oct	Nov	Dec	Year
Mean daily maximum °F (°C)	32.8 (0.4)	37.9 (3.3)	50.5 (10.3)	63.3 (17.4)	73.2 (22.9)	83.1 (28.4)	86.4 (30.2)	85.2 (29.6)	78.6 (25.9)	65.4 (18.6)	50.6 (10.3)	37.7 (3.2)	62.1 (16.7)
Daily mean °F (°C)	24.0 (−4.4)	28.4 (−2.0)	40.0 (4.4)	51.7 (10.9)	62.6 (17.0)	72.4 (22.4)	75.8 (24.3)	74.2 (23.4)	66.4 (19.1)	54.2 (12.3)	40.8 (4.9)	29.3 (−1.5)	51.7 (10.9)
Mean daily minimum °F (°C)	15.3 (−9.3)	18.9 (−7.3)	29.4 (−1.4)	40.0 (4.4)	52.1 (11.2)	61.8 (16.6)	65.3 (18.5)	63.3 (17.4)	54.3 (12.4)	43.0 (6.1)	31.0 (−0.6)	20.9 (−6.2)	41.3 (5.1)
Average precipitation inches (mm)	1.48 (38)	1.89 (48)	2.56 (65)	3.72 (94)	5.01 (127)	4.98 (126)	4.24 (108)	3.88 (99)	3.92 (100)	3.09 (78)	2.50 (64)	1.96 (50)	39.23 (997)
Average snowfall inches (cm)	7.3 (19)	7.4 (19)	3.0 (7.6)	0.7 (1.8)	0.0 (0.0)	0.0 (0.0)	0.0 (0.0)	0.0 (0.0)	0.0 (0.0)	0.3 (0.76)	1.5 (3.8)	6.4 (16)	26.6 (67.96)
Source: NOAA

== Demographics ==
Historical populations
Year	Pop.	±%
1880	82	—
1900	270	+229.3%
1910	337	+24.8%
1920	456	+35.3%
1930	581	+27.4%
1940	515	−11.4%
1950	589	+14.4%
1960	709	+20.4%
1970	798	+12.6%
1980	972	+21.8%
1990	940	−3.3%
2000	963	+2.4%
2010	912	−5.3%
2020	885	−3.0%
Source:"U.S. Census website". United States Census Bureau. and Iowa Data Center; Source: U.S. Decennial Census

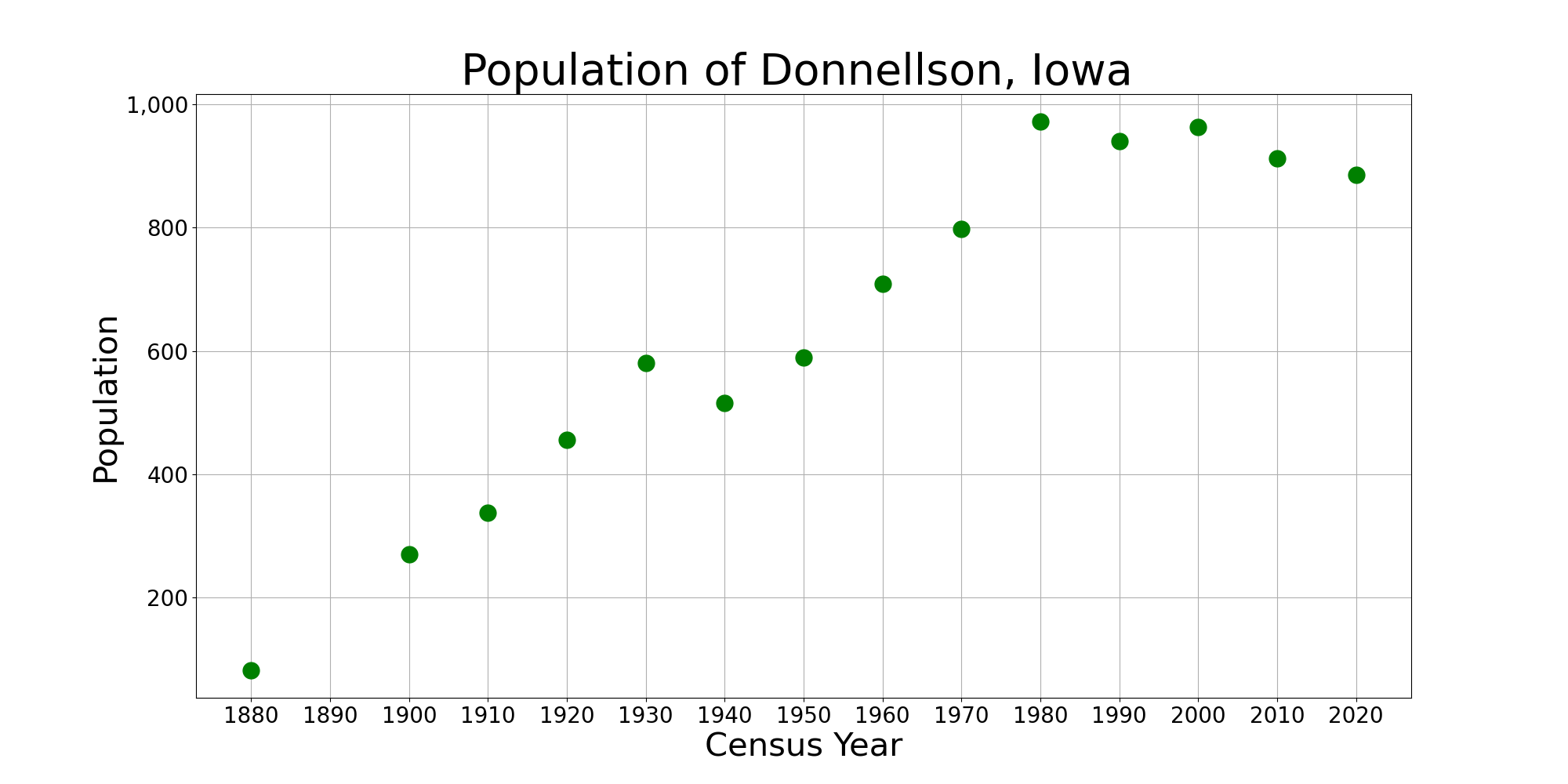
The population of Donnellson, Iowa from US census data

=== 2020 census ===
As of the census of 2020, there were 885 people, 363 households, and 222 families residing in the city. The population density was 695.3 inhabitants per square mile (268.5/km^{2}). There were 404 housing units at an average density of 317.4 per square mile (122.6/km^{2}). The racial makeup of the city was 97.5% White, 0.5% Black or African American, 0.0% Native American, 0.1% Asian, 0.0% Pacific Islander, 0.1% from other races and 1.8% from two or more races. Hispanic or Latino persons of any race comprised 1.6% of the population.

Of the 363 households, 32.8% of which had children under the age of 18 living with them, 45.5% were married couples living together, 6.1% were cohabitating couples, 30.3% had a female householder with no spouse or partner present and 18.2% had a male householder with no spouse or partner present. 38.8% of all households were non-families. 35.0% of all households were made up of individuals, 22.0% had someone living alone who was 65 years old or older.

The median age in the city was 41.5 years. 26.0% of the residents were under the age of 20; 4.2% were between the ages of 20 and 24; 22.5% were from 25 and 44; 24.4% were from 45 and 64; and 22.9% were 65 years of age or older. The gender makeup of the city was 47.3% male and 52.7% female.

=== 2010 census ===
As of the census of 2010, there were 912 people, 378 households, and 226 families living in the city. The population density was 723.8 inhabitants per square mile (279.5/km^{2}). There were 415 housing units at an average density of 329.4 per square mile (127.2/km^{2}). The racial makeup of the city was 99.0% White, 0.1% African American, 0.1% Native American, 0.2% Asian, and 0.5% from two or more races. Hispanic or Latino of any race were 0.4% of the population.

There were 378 households, of which 30.4% had children under the age of 18 living with them, 45.2% were married couples living together, 11.4% had a female householder with no husband present, 3.2% had a male householder with no wife present, and 40.2% were non-families. 35.4% of all households were made up of individuals, and 14.3% had someone living alone who was 65 years of age or older. The average household size was 2.29 and the average family size was 2.98.

The median age in the city was 41.1 years. 24.2% of residents were under 18; 7.9% were between 18 and 24; 22.6% were from 25 to 44; 25.1% were from 45 to 64, and 20.2% were 65 years of age or older. The gender makeup of the city was 48.1% male and 51.9% female.

=== 2000 census ===
As of the census of 2000, there were 963 people, 386 households, and 270 families living in the city. The population density was 1,208.8 inhabitants per square mile (466.7/km^{2}). There were 415 housing units at an average density of 520.9 per square mile (201.1/km^{2}). The racial makeup of the city was 98.65% White, 0.21% African American, 0.31% Asian, 0.31% from other races, and 0.52% from two or more races. Hispanic or Latino of any race were 0.93% of the population.

There were 386 households, out of which 31.3% had children under the age of 18 living with them, 57.8% were married couples living together, 9.8% had a female householder with no husband present, and 29.8% were non-families. 27.5% of all households were made up of individuals, and 14.8% had someone living alone who was 65 years of age or older. The average household size was 2.33 and the average family size was 2.83.

In the city, the population was spread out, with 23.5% under the age of 18, 7.1% from 18 to 24, 24.1% from 25 to 44, 19.8% from 45 to 64, and 25.5% who were 65 years of age or older. The median age was 42 years. For every 100 females, there were 78.3 males. For every 100 females age 18 and over, there were 78.5 males.

The median income for a household in the city was $36,316, and the median income for a family was $41,500. Males had a median income of $34,125 versus $24,688 for females. The per capita income for the city was $18,336. About 4.3% of families and 3.6% of the population were below the poverty line, including 1.7% of those under age 18 and 5.9% of those age 65 or over.
