= Montrose Township, Lee County, Iowa =

Township in Lee County, Iowa, U.S.

Coordinates: 40.506°N 91.433°W

Montrose Township is a township in Lee County, Iowa.

== History ==
Montrose Township was organized in 1841.
