= Illinois's 15th congressional district =

U.S. House district for Illinois

Coordinates: 38°54′19″N 88°26′32″W

- Interactive map of district boundaries since January 3, 2023
- Representative: Mary Miller; R–Oakland
- Area: 17,008.6 mi^{2} (44,052 km^{2})
- Distribution: 51.4% rural; 48.6% urban
- Population (2025): 751,936
- Median household income: $76,484
- Ethnicity: 89.7% White; 3.4% Two or more races; 2.9% Black; 2.8% Hispanic; 0.7% Asian; 0.5% other
- Cook PVI: R+20

Illinois' 15th congressional district is a U.S. congressional district located in the state of Illinois. Situated in central Illinois, the district is predominantly rural. It was located in eastern and southeastern Illinois until 2022. It has been represented by Republican Mary Miller since 2021.

With a Cook Partisan Voting Index rating of R+20, it is one of the most Republican-leaning districts in Illinois. In most of the district, there are no elected Democrats above the county level, and Donald Trump carried over 65% of the district's vote in all of his bids for president.

== History ==
=== 2011 redistricting ===
The congressional district covers parts of Bond, Champaign, Ford and Madison counties, and all of Clark, Clay, Clinton, Coles, Crawford, Cumberland, Douglas, Edgar, Edwards, Effingham, Fayette, Gallatin, Hamilton, Hardin, Jasper, Johnson, Lawrence, Madison, Marion, Massac, Moultrie, Pope, Richland, Saline, Shelby, Vermilion, Wabash, Washington, Wayne, and White counties. All or parts of Centralia, Charleston, Danville, Edwardsville, Effingham, Glen Carbon, Mattoon, and Rantoul are included. The representatives for these districts were elected in the 2012 primary and general elections, and the boundaries became effective on January 5, 2013.

== Composition ==
For the 118th and successive Congresses (based on redistricting following the 2020 census), the district contains all or portions of the following counties, townships, and municipalities:

Adams County (37)

All 37 townships and municipalities

Bond County (19)

All 19 townships and municipalities

Brown County (13)

All 13 townships and municipalities

Calhoun County (5)

All five municipalities

Cass County (16)

All 16 townships and municipalities

Champaign County (35)

Allerton (part, shared with Vermillion County), Ayers Township, Broadlands, Compromise Township, Condit Township, Crittenden Township, Fisher (part, also 2nd), Gifford, Hensley Township (part, also 13th), Homer, Longview, Mahomet, Mahomet Township, Newcomb Township, Ogden, Ogden Township, Pesotum, Pesotum Township, Philo, Philo Township, Rantoul Township (part, also 2nd), Raymond Township, Royal, Sadorus, Sadorus Township (part, also 13th), Sidney, Sidney Township, Somer Township (part, also 13th), South Homer Township, St. Joseph, St. Joseph Township, Stanton Township, Thomasboro, Tolono (part, also 13th), Tolono Township (part, also 13th)

Christian County (32)

All 32 townships and municipalities

Coles County (9)

Charleston (part, also 12th), Charleston Township (part, also 12th), Humboldt, Humboldt Township, Lafayette Township (part, also 12th), Mattoon (part, also 12th), Mattoon Township (part, also 12th), North Okaw Township, Seven Hickory Township

DeWitt County (20)

All 20 townships and municipalities

Douglas County (18)

All 18 townships and municipalities

Edgar County (23)

All 23 townships and municipalities

Fayette County (27)

All 27 townships and municipalities

Fulton County (16)

Astoria, Astoria Township, Bernadotte Township, Farmers Township, Isabel Township, Kerton Township, Lewistown, Lewistown Township, Liverpool, Liverpool Township, Pleasant Township, Table Grove, Vermont, Vermont Township, Waterford Township, Woodland Township

Greene County (22)

All 22 townships and municipalities

Hancock County (39)

All 39 townships and municipalities

Henderson County (20)

All 20 townships and municipalities

Jersey County (18)

All 18 townships and municipalities

Logan County (28)

All 28 townships and municipalities

Macon County (19)

Argenta, Austin Township, Blue Mound, Blue Mound Township, Decatur (part, also 13th), Friends Creek Township, Harristown (part, also 13th), Harristown Township (part, also 13th), Hickory Point Township (part, also 13th), Long Creek, Long Creek Township, Macon, Maroa, Maroa Township, Mount Zion, Mount Zion Township, Pleasant View Township, South Macon Township, South Wheatland Township

Madison County (32)

Alhambra, Alhambra Township, Alton (part, also 13th), Collinsville (part, also 13th), Collinsville Township (part, also 13th), Edwardsville (part, also 13th), Fort Russell Township (part, also 13th; includes part of Holiday Shores), Foster Township (part, also 13th), Glen Carbon (part, also 13th), Godfrey (part, also 13th), Hamel, Hamel Township, Helvetia Township, Highland, Jarvis Township, Leef Township, Livingston, Marine, Marine Township, Maryville (part, also 13th), Moro Township (part, also 13th; includes part of Holiday Shores), New Douglas, New Douglas Township, Olive Township, Omphghent Township, Pin Oak Township, Saline Township, St. Jacob, St. Jacob Township, Troy, Williamson, Worden

Mason County (22)

All 13 townships and municipalities

McDonough County (26)

Bethel Township, Blandinsville, Blandinsville Township, Bushnell, Bushnell Township, Chalmers Township, Colchester, Colchester Township, Eldorado Township, Emmet Township, Good Hope, Hire Township, Industry, Industry Township, Lamoine Township, Macomb (part, also 17th), Mound Township (part, also 17th), New Salem Township, Prairie City, Prairie City Township, Sciota, Sciota Township, Scotland Township, Tennessee, Tennessee Township, Walnut Grove Township

Menard County (5)

All five municipalities

Mercer County (14)

Abington Township, Aledo, Duncan Township, Eliza Township, Joy, Keithsburg, Keithsburg Township, Mercer Township, Millersburg Township, New Boston, New Boston Township, Ohio Grove Township, Seaton, Perryton Township

Montgomery County (38)

All 38 townships and municipalities

Morgan County (10)

All 10 townships and municipalities

Moultrie County (15)

All 15 townships and municipalities

Piatt County (10)

Atwood (part, shared with Douglas County), Blue Ridge Township, Cerro Gordo Township (part, also 13th; includes La Place), De Land, Goose Creek Township, Hammond, Mansfield, Monticello (part, also 13th), Sangamon Township, Unity Township

Pike County (42)

All 42 townships and municipalities

Sangamon County (25)

Berlin, Buffalo Hart Township, Cantrall, Cartwright Township, Clear Lake, Clear Lake Township, Curran, Curran Township, Fancy Creek Township, Gardner Township, Island Grove Township, Loami, Loami Township, Maxwell Township, New Berlin, New Berlin Township, Pleasant Plains, Riverton, Sherman, Spaulding, Springfield (part, also 13th), Springfield Township, Talkington Township, Williams Township, Williamsville

Schuyler County (17)

All 17 townships and municipalities

Scott County (7)

All seven municipalities

Shelby County (11)

All 11 townships and municipalities

Vermillion County (16)

Allerton (part, shared with Champaign County), Caitlin Township (part, also 2nd), Carroll Township, Danville Township (part, also 2nd), Elwood Township, Fairmount, Georgetown, Georgetown Township, Indianola, Jamaica Township, Love Township, McKendree Township, Ridge Farm, Sidell, Sidell Township, Vance Township

Warren County (14)

Berwick Township, Ellison Township, Floyd Township, Greenbush Township, Hale Township, Kirkwood, Lenox Township, Little York, Point Pleasant Township, Roseville, Roseville Township, Sumner Township, Swan Township, Tompkins Township

== Recent election results from statewide races ==
Year	Office	Results
2008	President	McCain 52% - 44%
2012	President	Romney 62% - 38%
2016	President	Trump 66% - 28%
2016	Senate	Kirk 60% - 35%
2016	Comptroller (Spec.)	Munger 63% - 31%
2018	Governor	Rauner 56% - 30%
2018	Attorney General	Harold 69% - 28%
2018	Secretary of State	White 50% - 47%
2018	Comptroller	Senger 59% - 37%
2018	Treasurer	Dodge 59% - 38%
2020	President	Trump 68% - 30%
2020	Senate	Curran 65% - 32%
2022	Senate	Salvi 66% - 32%
2022	Governor	Bailey 69% - 28%
2022	Attorney General	DeVore 70% - 28%
2022	Secretary of State	Brady 70% - 28%
2022	Comptroller	Teresi 65% - 33%
2022	Treasurer	Demmer 67% - 31%
2024	President	Trump 69% - 29%

== List of members representing the district ==
Representative	Party	Years	Cong ress	Electoral history	District location
District created March 4, 1873
John R. Eden (Sullivan)	Democratic	March 4, 1873 – March 3, 1879	43rd 44th 45th	Elected in 1872. Re-elected in 1874. Re-elected in 1876. Lost renomination.	
Albert P. Forsythe (Isabel)	Greenback	March 4, 1879 – March 3, 1881	46th	Elected in 1878. Lost re-election as a Republican.	
Samuel W. Moulton (Shelbyville)	Democratic	March 4, 1881 – March 3, 1883	47th	Elected in 1880. Redistricted to the 17th district.	
Joseph G. Cannon (Danville)	Republican	March 4, 1883 – March 3, 1891	48th 49th 50th 51st	Redistricted from the 14th district and re-elected in 1882. Re-elected in 1884. Re-elected in 1886. Re-elected in 1888. Lost re-election.	
Samuel T. Busey (Urbana)	Democratic	March 4, 1891 – March 3, 1893	52nd	Elected in 1890. Lost re-election.	
Joseph G. Cannon (Danville)	Republican	March 4, 1893 – March 3, 1895	53rd	Elected again in 1892. Redistricted to the 12th district.	
Benjamin F. Marsh (Warsaw)	Republican	March 4, 1895 – March 3, 1901	54th 55th 56th	Redistricted from the 11th district and re-elected in 1894. Re-elected in 1896. Re-elected in 1898. Lost re-election.	
J. Ross Mickey (Macomb)	Democratic	March 4, 1901 – March 3, 1903	57th	Elected in 1900. Retired.	
George W. Prince (Galesburg)	Republican	March 4, 1903 – March 3, 1913	58th 59th 60th 61st 62nd	Redistricted from the 10th district and re-elected in 1902. Re-elected in 1904. Re-elected in 1906. Re-elected in 1908. Re-elected in 1910. Lost re-election.	
Stephen A. Hoxworth (Rapatee)	Democratic	March 4, 1913 – March 3, 1915	63rd	Elected in 1912. Retired.	
Edward John King (Galesburg)	Republican	March 4, 1915 – February 17, 1929	64th 65th 66th 67th 68th 69th 70th	Elected in 1914. Re-elected in 1916. Re-elected in 1918. Re-elected in 1920. Re-elected in 1922. Re-elected in 1924. Re-elected in 1926. Re-elected in 1928. Died.	
Vacant		February 17, 1929 – November 4, 1930	70th 71st		
Burnett M. Chiperfield (Canton)	Republican	November 4, 1930 – March 3, 1933	71st 72nd	Elected to finish King's term. Re-elected in 1930. Lost re-election.	
J. Leroy Adair (Quincy)	Democratic	March 4, 1933 – January 3, 1937	73rd 74th	Elected in 1932. Re-elected in 1934. Retired.	
Lewis L. Boyer (Quincy)	Democratic	January 3, 1937 – January 3, 1939	75th	Elected in 1936. Lost re-election.	
Robert B. Chiperfield (Canton)	Republican	January 3, 1939 – January 3, 1949	76th 77th 78th 79th 80th	Elected in 1938. Re-elected in 1940. Re-elected in 1942. Re-elected in 1944. Re-elected in 1946. Redistricted to the 19th district.	
Noah M. Mason (Oglesby)	Republican	January 3, 1949 – January 3, 1963	81st 82nd 83rd 84th 85th 86th 87th	Redistricted from the 12th district and re-elected in 1948. Re-elected in 1950. Re-elected in 1952. Re-elected in 1954. Re-elected in 1956. Re-elected in 1958. Re-elected in 1960. Retired.	
Charlotte T. Reid (Aurora)	Republican	January 3, 1963 – October 7, 1971	88th 89th 90th 91st 92nd	Elected in 1962. Re-elected in 1964. Re-elected in 1966. Re-elected in 1968. Re-elected in 1970. Resigned to become member of the Federal Communications Commission.	
Vacant		October 7, 1971 – April 4, 1972	92nd		
Cliffard D. Carlson (Geneva)	Republican	April 4, 1972 – January 3, 1973	92nd	Elected to finish Reid's term. Retired.	
Leslie C. Arends (Melvin)	Republican	January 3, 1973 – December 31, 1974	93rd	Redistricted from the 17th district and re-elected in 1972. Retired and then resigned early.	
Vacant		December 31, 1974 - January 3, 1975			
Tim Lee Hall (Dwight)	Democratic	January 3, 1975 – January 3, 1977	94th	Elected in 1974. Lost re-election.	
Tom Corcoran (Ottawa)	Republican	January 3, 1977 – January 3, 1983	95th 96th 97th	Elected in 1976. Re-elected in 1978. Re-elected in 1980. Redistricted to the 14th district.	
Edward R. Madigan (Lincoln)	Republican	January 3, 1983 – March 8, 1991	98th 99th 100th 101st 102nd	Redistricted from the 21st district and re-elected in 1982. Re-elected in 1984. Re-elected in 1986. Re-elected in 1988. Re-elected in 1990. Resigned to become U.S. Secretary of Agriculture.	
Vacant		March 8, 1991 – July 2, 1991	102nd		
Thomas W. Ewing (Pontiac)	Republican	July 2, 1991 – January 3, 2001	102nd 103rd 104th 105th 106th	Elected to finish Madigan's term. Re-elected in 1992. Re-elected in 1994. Re-elected in 1996. Re-elected in 1998. Retired.	
Timothy V. Johnson (Urbana)	Republican	January 3, 2001 – January 3, 2013	107th 108th 109th 110th 111th 112th	Elected in 2000. Re-elected in 2002. Re-elected in 2004. Re-elected in 2006. Re-elected in 2008. Re-elected in 2010. Retired.	
Timothy V. Johnson (Urbana)	Republican	January 3, 2001 – January 3, 2013	107th 108th 109th 110th 111th 112th	Elected in 2000. Re-elected in 2002. Re-elected in 2004. Re-elected in 2006. Re-elected in 2008. Re-elected in 2010. Retired.	2003–2013 Included the cities of Charleston, Urbana, Danville, and Champaign, and all or parts of Livingston, Iroquois, Ford, McLean, DeWitt, Champaign, Vermillion, Macon, Piatt, Douglas, Edgar, Moultrie, Coles, Cumberland, Clark, Crawford, Lawrence, Wabash, Edwards, White, Saline, and Gallatin counties.
John Shimkus (Collinsville)	Republican	January 3, 2013 – January 3, 2021	113th 114th 115th 116th	Redistricted from the 19th district. Re-elected in 2012. Re-elected in 2014. Re-elected in 2016. Re-elected in 2018. Retired.	2013–2023
Mary Miller (Oakland)	Republican	January 3, 2021 – present	117th 118th 119th	Elected in 2020. Re-elected in 2022. Re-elected in 2024. Re-elected in 2026.	2013–2023
Mary Miller (Oakland)	Republican	January 3, 2021 – present	117th 118th 119th	Elected in 2020. Re-elected in 2022. Re-elected in 2024. Re-elected in 2026.	2023–present

== Recent election results ==
=== 2012 ===
The district covered much of the territory previously in the 19th district, and its incumbent, Republican John Shimkus, filed to run in the redrawn 15th. Angela Michael, a retired nurse and anti-abortion activist, ran on a single-issue anti-abortion Democratic ticket.

Illinois's 15th congressional district, 2012
Party	Candidate	Votes	%
Republican	John Shimkus (incumbent)	205,775	68.6
Democratic	Angela Michael	94,162	31.4
Total votes		299,937	100.0
Republican hold			

=== 2014 ===
Illinois's 15th congressional district, 2014
Party	Candidate	Votes	%
Republican	John Shimkus (incumbent)	166,274	74.9
Democratic	Eric Thorsland	55,652	25.1
Total votes		221,926	100.0
Republican hold			

=== 2016 ===
Shimkus faced no opposition in the general election, after facing a challenge in the Republican primary from Illinois State Senator Kyle McCarter, who had Tea Party backing and funding from the Club for Growth.

Illinois's 15th congressional district, 2016
Party	Candidate	Votes	%
Republican	John Shimkus (incumbent)	274,554	100.0
Total votes		274,554	100.0
Republican hold			

=== 2018 ===
Shimkus loomed large in the 15th, but finally faced credible (if not well-funded) Democratic opposition from a local teacher and former Obama campaign worker.

Illinois's 15th congressional district, 2018
Party	Candidate	Votes	%
Republican	John Shimkus (incumbent)	181,294	70.9
Democratic	Kevin Gaither	74,309	29.1
Independent	Tim E. Buckner (write-in)	5	0.0
Total votes		255,608	100.0
Republican hold			

=== 2020 ===
After John Shimkus announced that he would not seek reelection, Republican nominee Mary Miller and Democratic nominee Erika Weaver emerged as contenders for the open Congressional seat.

Illinois's 15th congressional district, 2020
Party	Candidate	Votes	%	±%
Republican	Mary Miller	244,947	73.45	+2.52%
Democratic	Erika Weaver	88,559	26.55	−2.52%
Total votes		333,506	100.0	
Republican hold				

=== 2022 ===
Illinois's 15th congressional district, 2022
Party	Candidate	Votes	%
Republican	Mary Miller (incumbent)	213,007	71.14
Democratic	Paul Lange	86,396	28.86
Total votes		299,403	100.0
Republican hold			

=== 2024 ===
Illinois's 15th congressional district, 2024
Party	Candidate	Votes	%
Republican	Mary Miller (incumbent)	308,825	99.55
Write-in		1,409	0.45
Total votes		310,234	100.0
Republican hold			

== See also ==
- Illinois's congressional districts
- List of United States congressional districts
