= Illinois Route 336 =

State highway in western Illinois, US

Illinois Route 336
- Thomas A. Oakley Memorial Highway; Chicago-Kansas City Expressway
- IL 336 highlighted in red

Route information
- Maintained by IDOT
- Length: 60.8 mi (97.8 km)
- Existed: 1979–present

Major junctions
- South end: I-172 / US 24 / IL 110 (CKC) in Bloomfield
- IL 61 in Mendon; IL 61 near Loraine; IL 94 near Bowen; US 136 / IL 94 in Carthage; IL 61 near Tennessee; US 136 in Tennessee
- North end: US 67 / IL 110 (CKC) in Macomb

Location
- Country: United States
- State: Illinois
- Counties: Adams, Hancock, McDonough

Highway system
- Illinois State Highway System; Interstate; US; State; Tollways; Scenic
← I-294 Toll	→ IL 351

Illinois Route 336 (IL 336, also known as the Thomas A. Oakley Memorial Highway) is a four-lane freeway/expressway combination that serves western Illinois. It is also used by the Illinois Department of Transportation (IDOT) as a part of Federal-Aid Primary Highway 315 (FAP315) to refer to a future project connecting the cities of Quincy and Peoria via underserved Macomb.

As of early 2018, the highway extends north from its starting point in Fowler (near Quincy) where U.S. Route 24 (US 24) and Interstate 172 (I-172) intersect, to US 67 just north of Macomb. IL 336 is 80 miles (129 km) long.

== Route description ==
For almost its entire length, IL 336 is a four-lane divided expressway without property access, but has many at-grade intersections with sideroads. The only interchanges currently built on IL 336 are with US 136/IL 94/Hancock County Road 1500 in Carthage, IL 61 at Mendon, and US 136 west of Macomb.

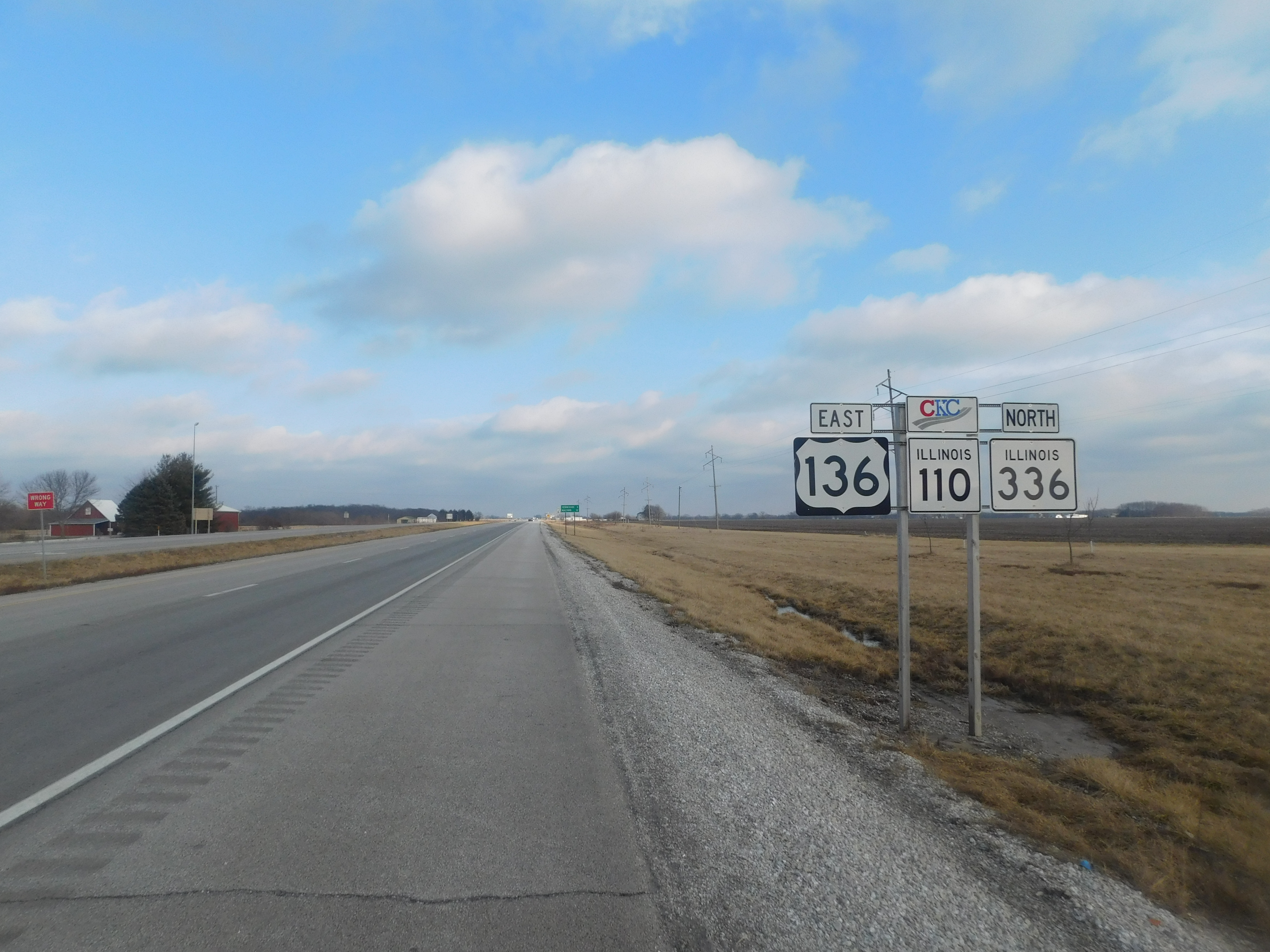
IL 336 heading east from IL 61 with US 136 and IL 110

IL 336 overlaps IL 61 from south of Mendon to south of Loraine. These two roads serve the Adams County Fairgrounds. Further north, IL 336 overlaps IL 94 about seven miles (11 km) past Loraine, and continues until IL 336 intersects with US 136 in Carthage. (IL 94 continues north to near the Quad Cities.)

IL 336 bypasses Carthage to the south and east, with a full interchange (US 136) east of Carthage. The highway turns east and overlaps US 136 east of Carthage toward Macomb. Highway bridges over two branches of the LaMoine River as well as an overpass for the BNSF Railway and IL 61 carry the highway east with new alignments south of both Tennessee and Colchester. IL 61 has an at-grade T-intersection with the highway at the same location as the alignment of US 136. The two highways are concurrent to the point west of BNSF Railway overpass, where US 136 splits off to its former alignment through Tennessee and Colchester. IL 336 continues east and turns north to Macomb. There is an underpass under BNSF Railway and a partial cloverleaf interchange connecting US 136. The expressway then downgrades to a super-two. The super-two continues as a northwest bypass of Macomb until it ends at US 67/IL 110.

== History ==
The Quincy inspired highway was vigorously opposed by State Representative Bill Edley, (D-Macomb). Edley considered the four-lane project a waste of taxpayer money compared to other west-central Illinois highway priorities, such as constructing a four-lane US 67 highway from the Quad-Cities through Macomb to Alton and St. Louis; connecting the Macomb region to Peoria, and maintaining the region’s farm-to-market highways.

Edley successfully placed an amendment on 1993 IDOT transportation funding legislation (HB1246) reducing to $1.00 Quincy project’s state funding, but funding was later restored.

“There is little benefit to Illinois taxpayers in spending $300 million for a four-lane highway connecting Macomb, a community of 20,000, to Quincy, a community of 40,000,” Edley said at the time. “Our region has been called “Forgottonia” because we don’t have modern highway connections to major markets, such as St. Louis, Peoria, and Quad-Cities. Connecting two small communities within our region only maintains our isolation.”

Earlier, Edley had been successful in funding the $100M Quad-City US67 four-lane link from Monmouth to Macomb. Illinois Democrats lost their House majority in the 1994 GOP landslide election, and Edley was defeated as well.

Twenty-two years later neither the Corridor US 67 to St. Louis, or access to the Peoria and Chicago markets have been built or funded.

In 1979, IL 336 first appeared between IL 96 and US 24 just east of Quincy. By 1983, it was extended to what used to be Illinois Route 79. Six years later, it was eventually extended again to IL 96 near Hull. By 1991, a freeway connection between IL 96 and IL 100 was finished; initially designated as part of US 36.

Since 1995, part of US 36, from Springfield to south of Quincy, was cosigned with I-72. As a result of this change, IL 336 from Fall Creek at the current junction with I-72, north to US 24 near Fowler, was redesignated from I-72/IL 336 to simply I-172. The upgrade of US 36 to Interstate standards provided Quincy with a much needed regional freeway. I-172 is a non-chargeable Interstate Highway, inasmuch it was built entirely with state funds designated as the original IL 336, until it received its I-172 designation. That same year, IL 336 was extended north to IL 61 at Mendon.

The completion of I-72 left only one other area in the state without regional freeway access—the area between Galesburg and Quincy. Specifically, Macomb and Western Illinois University are currently an hour and a half from the nearest Interstate Highways between the Illinois and Mississippi rivers in Illinois, I-74 to the north and I-72 to the south.

By 2004, IL 336 was extended north to IL 94 south of Denver, Illinois. By 2010, it was extended again to follow US 136 & IL 94, leave US 136 & IL 94 near Tennessee and Carthage respectively, and then end at US 136 west of Macomb. It was later entirely designated as part of the Chicago–Kansas City Expressway (IL 110). In 2018, the Macomb Bypass, signed as IL 110 and IL 336, opened to traffic as a 2-lane road between US 136 and US 67.

== Future ==
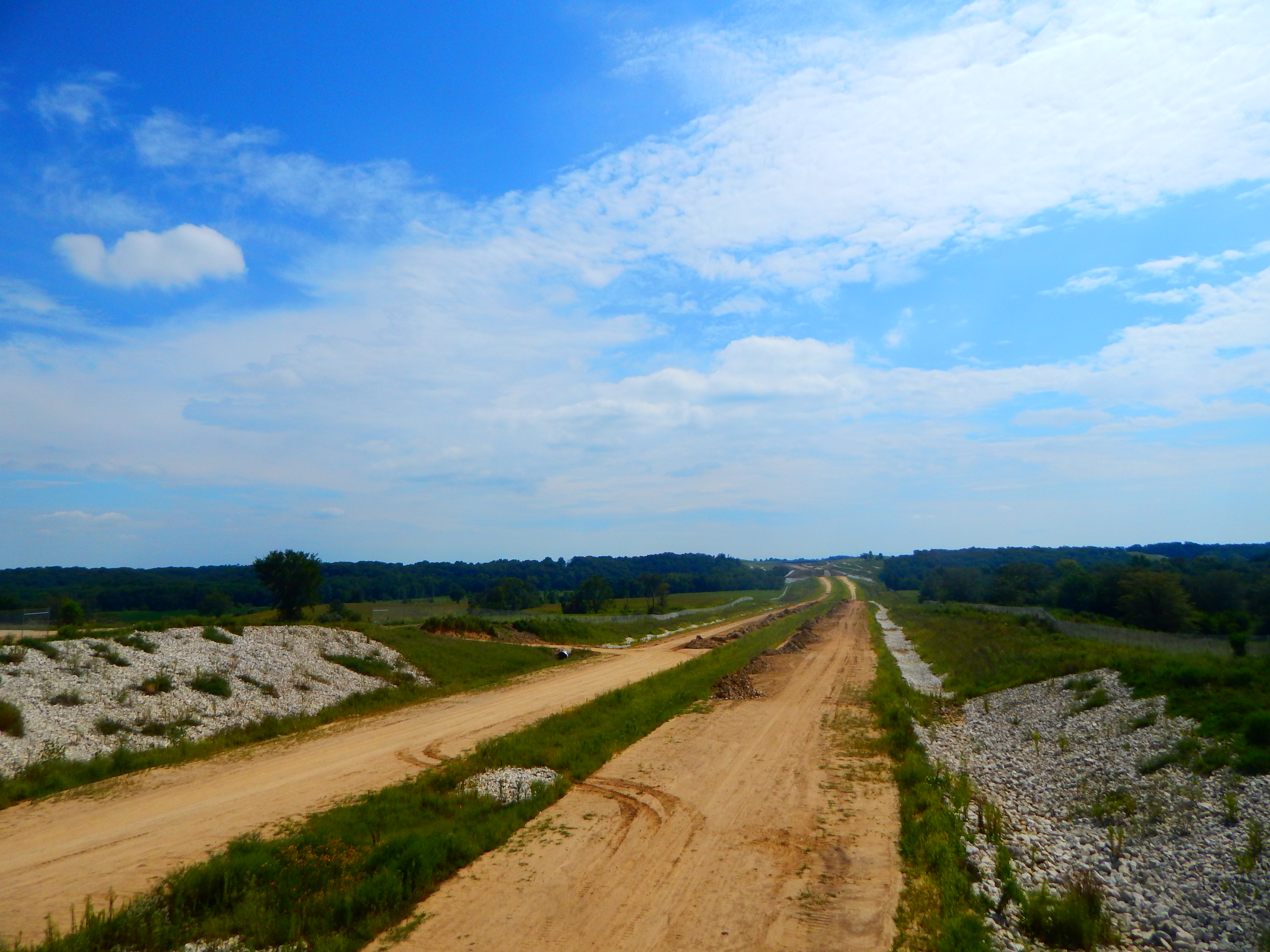
IL 336 construction of the Macomb Bypass in August 2015

IDOT launched a series of studies to help facilitate access to west central Illinois, colloquially named Forgottonia for the lack of highways through the region. Currently in progress are upgrades (to a four-lane expressway) of US 67 from US 34 in Monmouth (near Galesburg) south to Macomb, and US 67 from Macomb south to Alton, near St. Louis, Missouri. Also under way is a similar upgrade of IL 336 from Quincy to Macomb.

The Peoria-to-Macomb study involves an eastern link from Macomb to the Peoria area alongside existing US 136. The corridor being studied runs from US 67 east to I-474, and has been studied since the 1950s by Illinois and federal agencies as a potential link between Chicago and Kansas City, Missouri, the Chicago-Kansas City Expressway. As of May 2006, the corridor study had identified two alternatives for IL 336. The route would be a limited-access freeway for a few miles outside of Macomb to Bardolph, and again for a few miles outside of Peoria, east of Hanna City. For either alternative, IL 336 would be constructed as an expressway between Hanna City and Bardolph. In Illinois, an expressway allows partial access to the highway, with direct access to the expressway from private residences and fields, while retaining interchanges and frontage roads for businesses and arterial state routes.

The completion of IL 336 would also relieve congestion since there is currently no direct route between Peoria and Quincy. It would also allow Peoria-to-Quincy traffic to avoid the alternate route—I-155 south to I-55 through Springfield, to I-72 west. This combination of highways is currently the fastest route from Peoria to Quincy. IL 336 would shave at least 50 miles (80 km) and up to an hour off the trip. Currently, the I-155/I-55/I-72 route requires upwards of 3.25 hours of travel.

This route would also provide a faster route from Peoria to reach cities such as Kansas City and Denver. The bypass around Macomb will be up to Interstate standards.

== Major intersections ==
County	Location	mi	km	Destinations	Notes
Adams	Ellington Township	0.0	0.0	I-172 south / IL 110 (CKC) west – Hannibal, Springfield	Continuation beyond US 24; southern end of IL 110 concurrency
Adams	Ellington Township	0.0	0.0	US 24 – Mount Sterling, Quincy	Interchange
Adams	Mendon Township	6.6	10.6	IL 61 south – Mendon, Ursa	Interchange; southern end of IL 61 concurrency
Adams	Keene Township	11.0	17.7	IL 61 north	Northern end of IL 61 concurrency
Hancock	Chili Township	21.3	34.3	IL 94 south (400 North) – West Point, Bowen	Southern end of IL 94 concurrency
Hancock	Carthage Township	32.5	52.3	US 136 west / IL 94 north – Carthage, Keokuk, Macomb	Interchange; northern end of IL 94 concurrency
McDonough	Tennessee Township	44.7	71.9	IL 61 south	Northern terminus of IL 61
McDonough	Tennessee Township	46.5	74.8	US 136 east – Macomb	East end of US 136 overlap
McDonough	Chalmers Township	54.7	88.0	US 136 – Carthage, Adair	Interchange
McDonough	Emmet Township–Macomb Township line	60.8	97.8	US 67 / IL 110 (CKC) east – Chicago	Current northern terminus of IL 336; east end of IL 110 overlap
1.000 mi = 1.609 km; 1.000 km = 0.621 mi: Concurrency terminus
