= U.S. Route 136 in Illinois =

US Highway section within the state of Illinois

U.S. Route 136
- US 136 highlighted in red

Route information
- Maintained by IDOT
- Length: 225.5 mi (362.9 km)
- Existed: 1950–present

Major junctions
- West end: US 136 in Hamilton
- US 67 in Macomb; US 24 / IL 100 at Duncan Mills; I-155 near Emden; I-55 near McLean; US 51 in Heyworth; I-74 near Le Roy; US 150 near Le Roy; I-57 in Rantoul; US 45 in Rantoul; US 150 / IL 1 in Danville
- East end: US 136 near Danville

Location
- Country: United States
- State: Illinois
- Counties: Hancock, McDonough, Fulton, Mason, Logan, McLean, Champaign, Vermilion

Highway system
- United States Numbered Highway System; List; Special; Divided; Illinois State Highway System; Interstate; US; State; Tollways; Scenic
← IL 135	→ IL 136

U.S. Route 136 (US 136) runs east–west across central Illinois for 225.5 miles (362.9 km). US 136 enters the state from Iowa across the Keokuk–Hamilton Bridge over the Mississippi River between Keokuk, Iowa, and Hamilton, Illinois, and exits into Indiana east of Danville. The largest population centers along the route are Macomb, Rantoul, and Danville.

For nearly its entire route, US 136 is two-lane and rural, with the exception of portions in and around major towns and cities and its overlap with the Chicago–Kansas City Expressway. Despite the highway's rural routing, it has junctions into four Interstates: Interstate 155 (I-155), I-55, I-74, and I-57. Additionally, US 136 contains what is perhaps one of the longest straight stretches of a U.S. Highway east of the Mississippi River, running nearly 86 miles (138 km) without any deviations from north of Easton to just west of Rantoul.

== Route description ==
=== Hamilton to Havana ===
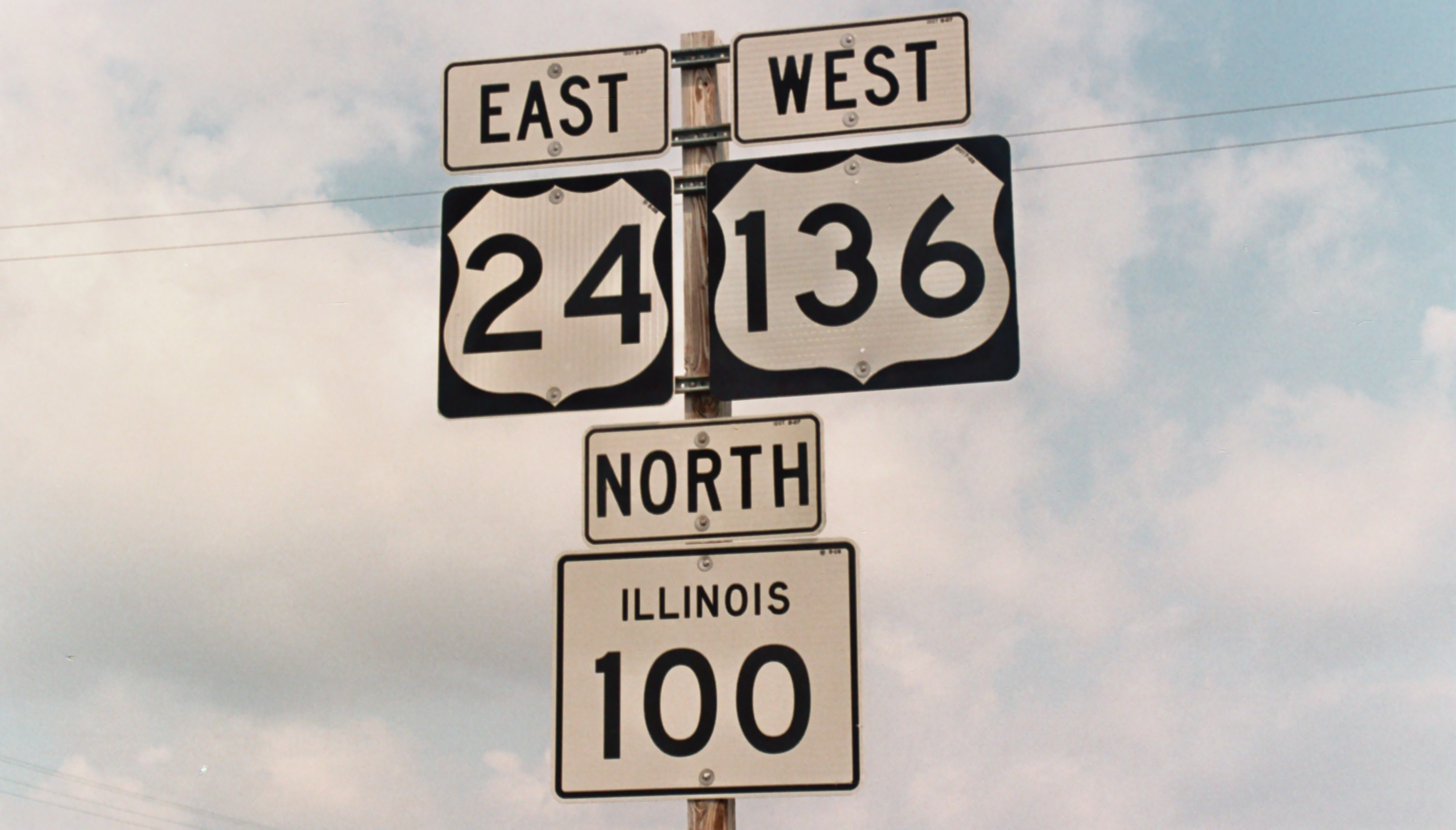
A wrong-way concurrency near Duncans Mill

From the Keokuk–Hamilton Bridge, US 136 exits Keokuk and enters Hamilton. US 136 then runs concurrently with Illinois Route 96 (IL 96) in Hamilton. It then bends slightly northwestward east of Elvaston as it is near Carthage. In Carthage, US 136 then runs concurrently with IL 94 until it reaches a diamond interchange east of the city. At that point, IL 94 leaves US 136 while it joins with IL 110 (CKC)/IL 336. US 136 then leaves the concurrency southwest of Tennessee. North of the McDonough County Courthouse in downtown Macomb, US 67 joins in from the north. US 67 then branches south from US 136 east of Macomb. It then turns southward as it intersects IL 41. Then, it turns southeast north of Adair and then south and then east at Table Grove. At Duncan Mills, US 136 then runs concurrently with US 24 and IL 100. US 24 then leaves as the other two routes bending eastward. IL 100 soon leaves US 136. Just west of the Scott W. Lucas Bridge, IL 78 and IL 97 join with US 136. After the crossing, IL 78 turns southward, leaving the concurrency.

=== Havana to Indiana state line ===
US 136 then turns northward and then eastward from IL 97. It then meets IL 29 from the south where it travels concurrently until it leaves northward near San Jose. Further east, US 136 reaches four diamond interchanges with I-155, I-55, US 51, and I-74 respectively. Furthermore, it also intersects US 150, IL 54, and IL 47. West of Rantoul, US 136 meets I-57 at a parclo interchange. In downtown Rantoul, it intersects US 45. At Armstrong, it turns south and then back east which overlaps IL 49. In the middle of Henning and Alvin, US 136 turns south which overlaps IL 1. The concurrency runs from the junction of US 136/IL 1/IL 119 to the junction of US 136/US 150/IL 1 in Danville. At that point, US 136 turns eastward all the way to Indiana.

== History ==
Initially, before the formation of US 136, parts of IL 9, IL 31, IL 43, IL 24, IL 1, and IL 10 followed what is now part of US 136. The rest of it wasn't built yet. Over time, new roads were being built. By 1929, IL 98, IL 122, and IL 119 were established. In 1935, IL 31 was superseded by US 24 while IL 43 was superseded by parts of IL 122 and IL 120. In 1939, a part of Illinois Route 10 (IL 10) moved its western terminus from Decatur to Keokuk, Iowa. This caused the relocation of IL 98 from Adair–Duncan Mills route to its present-day routing. This also caused IL 9 to relocate northward. Also, IL 119 finished extending to IL 10 east of Havana. Since 1950, most of IL 119, as well as some sections of IL 10, were removed in favor of US 136.

== Major intersections ==
County	Location	mi	km	Destinations	Notes
Mississippi River		0.0	0.0	US 136 west / Great River Road south	Continuation into Iowa
Mississippi River		0.0– 0.4	0.0– 0.64	Keokuk–Hamilton Bridge	
Hancock	Hamilton			Warsaw Road / Great River Road south – Warsaw	
Hancock	Hamilton	1.6– 1.7	2.6– 2.7	IL 96 north / Great River Road (National Route) north / Lincoln Heritage Trail (Western Branch) – Nauvoo	Eastern end of GRR overlap; western end of IL 96 overlap
Hancock	Hamilton	2.2	3.5	IL 96 south (14th Street) / Great River Road (National Route) south / Lincoln Heritage Trail (Western Branch) – Quincy	Eastern end of IL 96 overlap
Hancock	Carthage	13.3	21.4	IL 94 north (Madison Street) – La Harpe, Carl Sandburg College	Western end of IL 94 overlap
Hancock	Carthage	14.6– 15.0	23.5– 24.1	IL 94 / IL 110 (CKC) / IL 336 south – Quincy, Hannibal	Western end of IL 110 / 336 overlap; hospital signed eastbound only; interchange on IL 110 / 336
McDonough	Tennessee Township	26.9	43.3	IL 61 south – Augusta	Northern terminus of IL 61
McDonough	Tennessee Township	28.7	46.2	IL 110 (CKC) / IL 336 north – Macomb	Eastern end of IL 110 / 336 overlap
McDonough	Chalmers Township	35.3– 35.8	56.8– 57.6	IL 110 (CKC) / IL 336 – Quincy	Interchange
McDonough	Macomb	39.4	63.4	US 67 north (Lafayette Street) – Monmouth, WIU	Western end of US 67 overlap
McDonough	Scotland–Macomb township line	42.5	68.4	US 67 south – Industry	Eastern end of US 67 overlap
McDonough	Mound–New Salem township line	48.4	77.9	IL 41 north / County Road 1200 N – Bushnell	Southern terminus of IL 41
Fulton	Duncan Mills	69.8	112.3	US 24 east / IL 100 north – Lewistown	Western end of US 24 / IL 100 overlap
Fulton	Isabel Township	72.1	116.0	US 24 west / East Otto Road – Rushville	Eastern end of US 24 overlap
Fulton	Isabel Township	74.7– 74.8	120.2– 120.4	IL 100 south – Beardstown	Eastern end of IL 100 overlap
Fulton	Isabel Township	77.7– 77.9	125.0– 125.4	IL 78 north / IL 97 north (Illinois River Road) – Lewistown, Canton	Western end of IL 78 / 97 overlap
Illinois River		78.4– 78.8	126.2– 126.8	Scott Wike Lucas Bridge	
Mason	Havana	78.8	126.8	IL 78 south (Illinois River Road / South Water Street) / South Water Street – Virginia	Eastern end of IL 78 overlap
Mason	Havana	79.4	127.8	IL 97 south (East Dearborn Street) / South Promenade Street – Petersburg	Eastern end of IL 97 overlap
Mason	Sherman Township	90.5	145.6	IL 10 east – Easton, Mason City	Western terminus of IL 10; Mason City signed eastbound only
Mason	Allens Grove Township	98.7	158.8	IL 29 south / 3500E – Springfield	Western end of IL 29 overlap
Mason	Allens Grove Township	101.7	163.7	IL 29 north / CR 9 – Pekin	Eastern end of IL 29 overlap
Logan	Orvil Township	111.5– 111.7	179.4– 179.8	I-155 – Lincoln, Peoria	I-155 exit 10
Logan	Eminence Township			IL 136A Spur (Armington Road) – Armington, Minier	
McLean	McLean	126.7– 127.0	203.9– 204.4	I-55 – Springfield, Bloomington	I-55 exit 145
McLean	Heyworth	135.9– 136.1	218.7– 219.0	US 51 – Decatur, Bloomington, Normal	Interchange on US 51
McLean	Empire Township	149.7– 150.0	240.9– 241.4	I-74 – Champaign, Bloomington	I-74 exit 152
McLean	Empire Township	151.2	243.3	US 150 – Champaign, Bloomington	
McLean	Bellflower Township	158.4	254.9	IL 54 – Farmer City, Clinton, Gibson City	Farmer City signed eastbound, Clinton westbound
Champaign	Newcomb Township	167.9	270.2	IL 47 – Mahomet, Gibson City	
Champaign	Rantoul	178.2– 178.7	286.8– 287.6	I-57 – Champaign, Kankakee	I-57 exit 250
Champaign	Rantoul	180.0	289.7	US 45 (Century Boulevard) – Urbana, Paxton	
Vermilion	Middlefork Township	194.0	312.2	IL 49 north	Western end of IL 49 overlap
Vermilion	Middlefork Township	194.8	313.5	IL 49 south – Casey	Eastern end of IL 49 overlap
Vermilion	South Ross Township	207.3	333.6	IL 1 north / IL 119 east – Hoopeston, Alvin	Western end of IL 1 overlap; western terminus of IL 119
Vermilion	Danville	219.8	353.7	US 150 / IL 1 south (West Main Street / South Gilbert Street) – Urbana, Paris	Eastern end of IL 1 overlap
Vermilion	Danville Township	225.5	362.9	US 136 east – Covington	Continuation into Indiana
1.000 mi = 1.609 km; 1.000 km = 0.621 mi: Concurrency terminus

== See also ==
U.S. Route 136
Previous state: Iowa	Illinois	Next state: Indiana
