= Cannon Ball Route =

Auto trail in Missouri and Illinois, US

Major junctions
- West end: Kansas City, Missouri
- East end: Chicago, Illinois

Location
- Country: United States
- States: Illinois, Missouri, Iowa

Highway system
- Auto trails

The Cannon Ball Route was a historic auto trail that ran from Kansas City, Missouri, east-northeast to Chicago, Illinois, by way of Hannibal, Missouri, and Quincy, Illinois. A branch of the route connected the Missouri section of the highway to Des Moines, Iowa, by way of Leon, Iowa. The route was included in the 1917 Map of Marked Routes provided by the Illinois State Highway Department, a precursor to the modern-day Illinois Department of Transportation.

This highway routing closely parallels the Hannibal-Quincy to Chicago branch of the Chicago, Burlington & Quincy Railroad.

== Route description ==
The Missouri portion of the route ran from Kansas City to Quincy by way of Hannibal. The route also passed through La Belle, Edina, Kirksville, Milan, Harris, Liberty, Excelsior Springs, Richmond, Carrollton, Chillicothe, Trenton and Princeton.

In 1917, the Illinois section of the Cannon Ball Route was marked as running north from Quincy along modern-day Illinois Route 96 with the Rushville & Quincy Trail. It turned east at modern-day U.S. Route 24, before turning north at Camp Point. It eventually followed modern Illinois Route 61 to Bowen, where the route ran east. The route follows Illinois 61 to its terminus at U.S. Route 136 near Tennessee.

The route follows U.S. 136 east as the main road through Macomb to the 9-mile Y, SE of Bardolph, where the route diverts from U.S. 136, it turns north on modern-day Illinois Route 41. The Cannon Ball Route passes through Bushnell paralleling the CB&Q railroad north to Galesburg and ran largely on what is now U.S. 34 from Galesburg to Chicago, except for diversions to the city centers of Buda, Leland, and Bristol.

Near Yorkville, the route turns northeast onto Cannonball Trail to Bristol. The route then passed through downtown Montgomery and Aurora before running east-northeast to Naperville. Here, the Cannon Ball Route may have followed any of a number of streets before joining the Chicago-Kansas City-Gulf Highway in Maywood for the remainder of the journey into Chicago.

A branch of the route ran from Princeton, Missouri, to Des Moines, Iowa, via Leon, Iowa.

== History ==
The Cannon Ball Trail Association, which was based in Leon, Iowa, marked the Missouri and Iowa portions of the route in 1912. The Chicago Auto Club marked the Illinois segment of the highway in 1913. By 1915, the route was considered "one of the best-marked highways between Quincy... and Chicago", and an extension from Quincy to the St. Louis – Kansas City highway at Monroe City was posted.
