= Vishnu Springs, Illinois =

Vishnu Springs
- Ghost town, former resort
- Location within the state of Illinois
- Coordinates: 40°25′55.15″N 90°53′37.49″W
- Country: United States
- State: Illinois
- County: McDonough
- Founded: c. 1880
- Elevation: 594 ft (181 m)
- Time zone: UTC−6 (Central)
  - Summer (DST): UTC−5 (CDT)
- ZIP code: 62326
- Area codes: 217
- GNIS feature ID: 1721263
- Website: www.vishnusprings.org

Vishnu Springs is a ruined resort town located in a river valley in west-central McDonough County, Illinois. Not much of the town remains today; however, a few buildings still exist. The townsite is located in Tennessee Township.

== History ==
Throughout the 1880s, groups as large as 2,000 people gathered in a western Illinois river valley in what is now Vishnu Springs. According to legend, the natural spring water was said to have had medicinal properties capable of solving a variety of physical and psychological ailments. Some time in the 1880s, the land was named after the Hindu god Vishnu because of the supposed healing power of the water.

Near the start of the 20th century, a man named Darius Hicks took steps to start a town and health resort on the land around Vishnu Springs. He divided the land owned by his family into plots, and sold them for $30 each. The centerpiece of the town was a three-story hotel named the Capitol Hotel, which was built to attract people seeking the health and spiritual effects of the spring. The town featured two stores: a blacksmith shop and a restaurant. Transportation was provided by horse and buggy from the nearby town of Colchester, Illinois. Later, Hicks added parks, a fishing pond, a racetrack, and a schoolhouse.

In the summer of 1903, a supervisor was inspecting the horse that turned the gears of the resort's carousel. The supervisor was to ensure that the horse was walking at a steady pace while children were riding the carousel. Somehow, that supervisor's shirtsleeve was caught in the gears of the carousel, pulling him into them. Screams of terror interrupted the sound of the joyful children riding the carousel as the supervisor was crushed to his death. The carousel was stopped, and was never again ran.

Despite Hicks’ efforts, the town never prospered. Transportation was difficult due to the lack of rail lines or an easily navigable river. Hicks left the resort town in 1903, and indifferent management let the town decay. By the 1920s, most of the businesses had closed, large numbers of guests stopped visiting, and the town could be considered abandoned.

A man named Ira Post attempted to revive the resort in 1935. Post marketed the area as a vacation and picnic area that had limited success until the 1950s, when Post died. In 1968, a woman named Alfred White and two men named Albert Simmons and Irvin Minor tried to reopen the restaurant and country music attraction. In the 1970s, a group of students from Western Illinois University started a commune on the land. The commune sustained itself with farming, livestock, and occasional music festivals. The hotel was once again abandoned by 1982.

Most of the town is gone today, however the hotel still stands. Much of the hotel has been ruined by vandals and structural decay. The land was donated to Western Illinois University in 2003 as a wildlife refuge and a place for conservation and research.

== Ira & Reatha T. Post Wildlife Sanctuary ==
The property is now known as the Ira & Reatha T. Post Wildlife Sanctuary, and is operated by the Western Illinois University Foundation as a wildlife sanctuary and study area for the university's students.
