= Fandon, Illinois =

Fandon, Illinois Middletown
- Unincorporated community
- Location within Illinois Location within the United States
- Coordinates: 40.3684°N 90.7615°W
- Country: United States
- State: Illinois
- County: McDonough
- Elevation: 669 ft (204 m)
- Time zone: UTC-6 (Central (CST))
  - Summer (DST): UTC-5 (CDT)
- ZIP code: 62326
- Area code: 618
- GNIS feature ID: 408266

Fandon is an unincorporated community in Chalmers Township, McDonough County, Illinois, United States. The community is also known as Middletown. The nearest city to Fandon is Colchester. Fandon does not have its own post office and is part of Colchester's ZIP code. Formerly, it had Zip Code 62335.

== History ==
Fandon was established in 1837 by Major John Patrick and James Edmonston. It was originally called Middletown because it was the central point between Beardstown and Burlington. When citizens of McDonough County organized the Forgottonia secession movement in the 1970s, Fandon was named its capital.

== How the States Got Their Shapes (2011) ==
In 2011, The History Channel series How the States Got Their Shapes focused part of its second episode to the historic inequality given to the Illinois region known as Forgottonia, which was a region that considered seceding from the rest of Illinois and establishing its capital at Fandon. The governor of Forgottonia dedicated a home as his governor's mansion in rural Fandon, which was visited in the series. The area is so remote that the former governor himself forgot the zip code of Fandon.

== Education ==
Fandon is part of the West Prairie Community Unit School District 103. Students attend elementary school at South Elementary and then Middle School which are both located in Colchester. Students then go on to attend West Prairie High School in Sciota.
