= Argyle Lake =

Argyle Lake may refer to:

- Argyle Lake State Park, in Illinois, United States
- Argyle Lake, in Babylon Village, New York, United States
- Lake Argyle, in Australia
