= Duncan Mills =

Duncan Mills May refer to:

- Duncans Mills, California
- Duncan Mills, Illinois
