= Macomb Township =

Macomb Township may refer to the following places in the United States:

- Macomb Township, McDonough County, Illinois
- Macomb City Township, McDonough County, Illinois (contiguous with Macomb, Illinois)
- Macomb Township, Michigan
