= West Prairie High School =

West Prairie Jr/Sr High School

Location
- 600 S. Hun Street; Colchester, Illinois; USA; 40.41892°N 90.79146°W

Information
- Type: Public high school
- Principal: Megan Pittman
- Grades: 9–12
- Enrollment: 184 (2014-15)
- Campus: Rural
- Colors: Black; Silver
- Website: West Prairie High School

West Prairie Jr/Sr High School, is a public high school located at 600 S. Hun Street near Colchester, Illinois, a city in McDonough County, Illinois, within the Midwestern United States. It is part of West Prairie Community Unit School District 103, which serves the communities of Blandinsville, Colchester, Fandon, Good Hope, Sciota, and Tennessee; and includes West Prairie North Elementary School, and South Elementary School. West Prairie Jr/Sr High School used to be split between two buildings, with the current high school being used as the school district's middle school, with a high school building located in Sciota, however the locations were consolidated in August of 2023.

== Location ==
The campus is located in southern Colchester, 7 miles (11 km) southwest of Macomb, and serves a mixed village and rural residential community. The school is in the Macomb micropolitan statistical area.

== Controversy ==
In 2018, the school was involved in a lawsuit concerning limiting the free speech of the valedictorian speech of student Sam Bleckledge. According to Sam he wanted to mention Jesus Christ in his speech, but principal Scot Sullivan told him he could not mention Jesus and would have to change his speech or not speak.

The lawsuit brought by First Liberty Institute, a nonprofit law firm dedicated to defending religious freedom for all. demands an apology from the school system. The school district, through superintendent Carol Kever, denies wrongdoing and responded they did not deny the student free speech and freedom of religion, even though according to Judge Frank Easterbrook writing for the 7th U.S. Circuit Court of Appeals in the 1993 decision of Hedges v. Wauconda Community Unit School District, the school system can not censor student speech about religion.

West Prairie High School was formed by the consolidation of Colchester High School and Northwestern High School in 2003.

== Academics ==
West Prairie High School offers courses in the following academic departments:

- Agriculture
- Art
- Band and Chorus
- Business
- Drivers' Education
- English
- Health
- Home Economics
- Math
- Physical Education
- Science
- Social Studies
- Spanish
- Western Area Career System

== Athletics ==
West Prairie High School competes in the Prairieland Conference and is a member school in the Illinois High School Association. Its mascot is the Cyclone. The school has no state championships on record in team athletics and activities. It formed a cooperative agreement in 2009–2011 with nearby Macomb High School for boys' swimming and diving, and with Avon and Bushnell-Prairie City high schools for boys' and girls' track and field. In 2014, West Prairie formed a cooperative agreement with Bushnell-Prairie City to form BWP. Together, they do boys baseball, girls softball, football, and track. In 2016, the West Prairie High School volleyball team won the state championship game at Redbird Arena in Normal, Illinois.

== History ==
The history of West Prairie High School includes the history of its preceding component schools:

- Blandinsville High School
- Colchester High School
- Good Hope High School
- Northwestern High School
- Tennessee High School

=== Blandinsville High School ===
The first Blandinsville area school was begun in the late 1830s. The town was not actually platted until 1842 and began to develop from there. A school building was erected in 1868. Due to the growing population of school-aged children, a new school was built in 1905. An addition which included a gymnasium was built onto the stricture in 1924. Tragedy struck the town when the school building burned to the ground in 1934. Plans to build a new school were immediately begun and set in motion. The children went to class in several buildings around town as the new school was being erected. The building was completed in time for the Class of 1936's graduation ceremony.

The State of Illinois' consolidation movement of the late 1940s caught up to the towns of northwest McDonough County. In 1959 the towns of Blandinsville, Good Hope, and Sciota agreed to join forces to create one large school district, the Northwestern School District. The high school was located in Sciota. Blandinsville's school building continued to serve the Northwestern School District through 1975 as a grade school. A new building was built in Good Hope, allowing for the closing of the Blandinsville school. The building was given to the town of Blandinsville.

Shortly after the Blandinsville School building was given to the city, it was converted into an emergency fallout shelter; nuclear fallout shelter signs still hang outside.

The district that Blandinsville originally consolidated into (Northwestern) later consolidated again to include the towns of Colchester and Tennessee to create West Prairie, which held their spring plays in the Blandinsville gymnasium for several years.

In the 1990s the roof began to fail, and was replaced. The building was partially renovated with the intention of being transformed into a community center. Only a few years after the roof was re-done, it failed again, and the contractor who had done the job was nowhere to be found. With everyone discouraged and insufficient funds to fix the roof again, it was sold to a private citizen for $1.00. The private citizen currently rents a few of its rooms for storage. The roof still leaks and the gap constantly grows larger. Due to interior ceiling collapse, the southwest stairwell is for the most part impassable, as well as the classrooms on the southwest side on the third floor. The southwest corner of the gymnasium has begun to warp and buckle due to water damage. The doors and windows outside and inside remain mostly intact, and the large cast iron boiler in the basement still remains. There are still a few desks, chairs, and tables in the basement in what is left of the old boys' locker room (partially destroyed when the plans for renovating the school were still in play). The folding seats in the gymnasium remain, except for the balcony (upper deck area), in which the seating has been removed. All the lockers have been removed. All the fire, electrical, water, and plumbing systems have been disconnected.

2014 The building was torn down and now 2016 it is an open grass lot.

=== Colchester High School ===
Colchester traces its educational roots back to the late 19th century. The first graduating class from Colchester High School received their diplomas in 1891, or possibly 1892.

The original high school building closed in 1969. The new building graduated its first senior class in 1970.

Colchester High School reached enrollments as high as 230 students in the "baby-booming" mid-1970s. Enrollments in the 200 to 250 range were the norm for the late 1950s and 1960s, with Colchester High School's largest graduating class occurring in 1961. In the late 1940s, the students from nearby Tennessee High School joined the Colchester school system. Colchester built a new grade school building in 1955 and was joined by the students of Tennessee Grade School in 1956. The school system existed through the early 21st century, but consolidation talks began between Colchester and Sciota Northwestern High School during this time. The consolidation became a reality after the 2003 school year with the creation of the West Prairie School District.

The Colchester school building serves the West Prairie system, as there are two West Prairie Schools located in Colchester, a middle and an elementary school. The West Prairie Middle School served as Colchester High School from 1970 until its closing in 2003, along with the original high school building.

=== Good Hope High School ===
Good Hope residents supported having a school in their town for many years. A school system began there in the late 19th, or possibly early 20th century. The Good Hope High School joined a consolidation effort of several small towns, including its neighbors to the west, Sciota and Blandinsville, in 1959. The consolidated school district was known as the Northwestern School District, with the high school located in Sciota. Good Hope School remained open as host to the Northwestern School District Grade School. The Northwestern School District recently consolidated with Colchester to form the West Prairie School District. Sciota remained home of the high school and Good Hope now hosts a Grade School for the West Prairie School District.

=== Northwestern High School ===
In the late 1950s the towns of Blandinsville, Good Hope, and Sciota undertook a consolidation effort regarding the education of their children. The result was the creation of the Northwestern School District in 1959, with Marion E. Herzog as School board President. A building for the new district was located on Route 9 just south of Sciota. The Northwestern School District served the three communities and kids from farms in the surrounding area for about 44 years.

In 2003 the neighboring town of Colchester agreed to join forces with the Northwestern School District. This new effort created the West Prairie School District. The high school for the West Prairie School District remained located in the Northwestern High School building, south of Sciota.

=== Tennessee High School ===
Tennessee High School was established in the late 19th century. The school deactivated in the late 1940s. Tennessee continued to offer a grade school (grades 1–5) for the town and surrounding country kids. This closed in 1956 after Colchester built a new grade school. The students of Tennessee attended school as part of the Colchester school system after the Tennessee deactivation. The students of Tennessee now attend West Prairie High School in Sciota. The grammar school students attend school in Colchester.

=== Timeline ===
- 1868 - Blandinsville High School established
- Late 19th century - Colchester High School, Good Hope High School and Tennessee High School established
- 1948 (unverified) - Tennessee High School consolidated into Colchester High School
- 1959 - Blandinsville High School and Good Hope High School consolidated to form Northwestern High School in Sciota
- 2003 - Colchester High School and Northwestern High School consolidate to form West Prairie High School
- 2023 - West Prairie High School and West Prairie Middle School consolidate to form West Prairie Jr/Sr High School
