= Blandinsville, Illinois =

- Village
- Location in McDonough County, Illinois
- Coordinates: 40°33′16″N 90°52′25″W
- Country: United States
- State: Illinois
- County: McDonough
- Townships: Blandinsville, Hire

Area
  - Total: 0.88 sq mi (2.27 km^{2})
  - Land: 0.88 sq mi (2.27 km^{2})
  - Water: 0 sq mi (0.00 km^{2})
- Elevation: 722 ft (220 m)

Population (2020)
  - Total: 569
  - Density: 650.2/sq mi (251.03/km^{2})
- Time zone: UTC-6 (CST)
  - Summer (DST): UTC-5 (CDT)
- ZIP Code: 61420
- Area code: 309
- FIPS code: 17-06470
- GNIS feature ID: 2398132

Blandinsville is a village in McDonough County, Illinois, United States. The population was 569 at the 2020 census, down from 651 in 2010.

== History ==
The town is named for Joseph L. Blandin, owner of the first general store. In 1842, the town was platted on a tract known as Job's Settlement, named after early settlers William and Ira Job. A post office was established in 1843. The Frank Hicks House in Blandinsville was constructed by architect George Franklin Barber in 1895.

== Geography ==
Blandinsville is in northwestern McDonough County. Illinois Route 9 passes through the village as Washington Street, leading northwest 6 miles (10 km) to La Harpe and east 19 miles (31 km) to Bushnell. Macomb, the McDonough county seat, is 16 miles (26 km) to the southeast via IL-9 and U.S. Route 67.

According to the U.S. Census Bureau, Blandinsville has a total area of 0.88 square miles (2.28 km^{2}), all land. The village sits on a low ridge bordered by Little Creek to the north and Baptist Creek to the south. Both are west-flowing tributaries of La Harpe Creek, a tributary of the La Moine River and part of the Illinois River watershed.

== Demographics ==
Historical population
Census	Pop.	Note	%±
1860	455		—
1870	1,565		244.0%
1890	877		—
1900	995		13.5%
1910	987		−0.8%
1920	1,002		1.5%
1930	952		−5.0%
1940	914		−4.0%
1950	918		0.4%
1960	853		−7.1%
1970	922		8.1%
1980	886		−3.9%
1990	762		−14.0%
2000	777		2.0%
2010	651		−16.2%
2020	569		−12.6%
U.S. Decennial Census

As of the census of 2000, there were 777 people, 339 households, and 224 families residing in the village. The population density was 878.2 inhabitants per square mile (339.1/km^{2}). There were 353 housing units at an average density of 399.0 per square mile (154.1/km^{2}). The racial makeup of the village was 98.71% White, 0.13% Asian, 0.51% from other races, and 0.64% from two or more races. Hispanic or Latino of any race were 0.77% of the population.

There were 339 households, out of which 28.9% had children under the age of 18 living with them, 54.0% were married couples living together, 7.4% had a female householder with no husband present, and 33.9% were non-families. 29.8% of all households were made up of individuals, and 18.0% had someone living alone who was 65 years of age or older. The average household size was 2.29 and the average family size was 2.83.

In the village, the population was spread out, with 22.3% under the age of 18, 8.4% from 18 to 24, 26.5% from 25 to 44, 23.9% from 45 to 64, and 18.9% who were 65 years of age or older. The median age was 41 years. For every 100 females, there were 101.3 males. For every 100 females age 18 and over, there were 98.0 males.

The median income for a household in the village was $30,272, and the median income for a family was $39,028. Males had a median income of $30,625 versus $19,479 for females. The per capita income for the village was $15,203. About 6.8% of families and 8.8% of the population were below the poverty line, including 6.2% of those under age 18 and 7.2% of those age 65 or over.

== Education ==
Blandinsville is part of the West Prairie Community Unit School District 103. Students attend elementary school at North Elementary located in Good Hope and Middle School in Colchester. Students then go on to attend West Prairie High School in Sciota.
