= Bushnell Township =

Bushnell Township may refer to the following places in the United States:

- Bushnell Township, McDonough County, Illinois
- Bushnell Township, Michigan
