= Colmar, Illinois =

- Unincorporated community
- Location within Illinois Location within the United States
- Coordinates: 40°20′43″N 90°53′28″W
- Country: United States
- State: Illinois
- County: McDonough
- Elevation: 548 ft (167 m)
- Time zone: UTC-6 (Central (CST))
  - Summer (DST): UTC-5 (CDT)
- Area code: 309
- GNIS feature ID: 406391

Colmar is an unincorporated community in Lamoine Township, McDonough County, Illinois, United States. Colmar is located on Illinois Route 61, 4 miles (6.4 km) north-northeast of Plymouth. Colmar had a post office, which closed on July 18, 1992.
