= Argyle Lake State Park =

State park in Illinois

- Location within Illinois Location within the United States Location within North America
- Location: McDonough County, U.S.
- Nearest city: Colchester, Illinois
- Coordinates: 40°27′19″N 90°47′20″W
- Area: 1,700 acres (690 ha)
- Established: 1948
- Argyle Lake
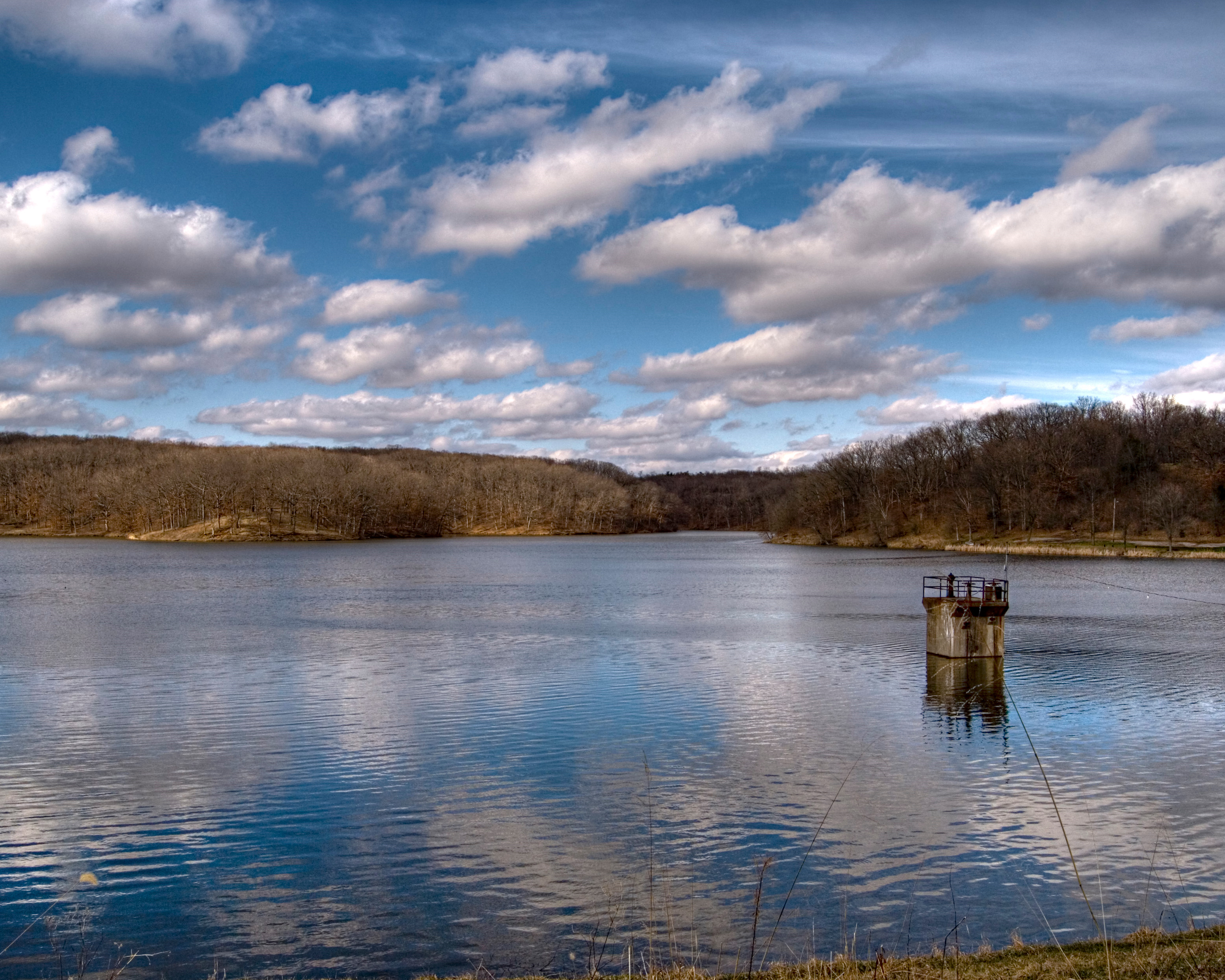

- Location within Illinois Location within the United States Location within North America
- Coordinates: 40.455960°N 90.793874°W
- Surface area: 93 acres (38 ha)
- Max. depth: 37 ft (11 m)
- Surface elevation: 611 ft (186 m)

Argyle Lake State Park is an Illinois state park located in Colchester, Illinois. The 1,700-acre (688 ha) park is home to the 93-acre (38 ha) Argyle Lake and 5 miles (8 km) of hiking trails and wooded campsites.

The land for the state park was purchased by the state in 1948 from local farmers. Argyle Lake, an artificial lake, was later created by damming a nearby water source. The area now occupied by the lake was once the home of "Argyle Hollow," part of the 19th century stagecoach route between Galena and Beardstown. The region was a source of coal, clay and limestone. While many of the brick works, clay and pottery operations have since closed, some limestone quarries in the area are still in operation today. There have been numerous Bigfoot sightings at the lake in recent years.
