= Prairie City, Illinois =

- Village
- Location in McDonough County, Illinois
- Coordinates: 40°37′25″N 90°27′54″W
- Country: United States
- State: Illinois
- County: McDonough
- Township: Prairie City

Area
  - Total: 1.01 sq mi (2.61 km^{2})
  - Land: 1.01 sq mi (2.61 km^{2})
  - Water: 0 sq mi (0.00 km^{2})
- Elevation: 666 ft (203 m)

Population (2020)
  - Total: 407
  - Density: 403.8/sq mi (155.92/km^{2})
- Time zone: UTC-6 (CST)
  - Summer (DST): UTC-5 (CDT)
- ZIP code: 61470
- Area code: 309
- FIPS code: 17-61548
- GNIS feature ID: 2399018

Prairie City is a village in McDonough County, Illinois, United States. The population was 407 at the 2020 census.

== Geography ==
Prairie City is located in the northeast corner of McDonough County. It is bordered to the north by Warren County. Illinois Route 41 passes through the village as East Main Street, leading northeast 8 miles (13 km) to St. Augustine and southwest 6 miles (10 km) to Bushnell. Macomb, the McDonough county seat, is 21 miles (34 km) to the southwest.

According to the U.S. Census Bureau, Prairie City has a total area of 1.01 square miles (2.62 km^{2}), all land. The village drains northeast toward Gallett Creek, a north-flowing tributary of Cedar Creek, part of the Spoon River watershed leading to the Illinois River.

== Demographics ==
Historical population
Census	Pop.	Note	%±
1860	770		—
1870	1,078		40.0%
1880	944		−12.4%
1890	812		−14.0%
1900	818		0.7%
1910	719		−12.1%
1920	638		−11.3%
1930	531		−16.8%
1940	574		8.1%
1950	500		−12.9%
1960	613		22.6%
1970	630		2.8%
1980	580		−7.9%
1990	497		−14.3%
2000	461		−7.2%
2010	379		−17.8%
2020	407		7.4%
U.S. Decennial Census

Per the 2010 US Census, Prairie City had 379 people. Among non-Hispanics this includes 371 White (97.9%), 5 Black (1.3%), 1 Asian (0.3%), & 1 from two or more races. The Hispanic or Latino population included 1 person (0.3%).

Of the 135 households 43 had children under the age of 18 living with them, 80 were married couples living together, 5 (3.7%) had a female householder with children and no husband present, and 34 were non-families. 25 households were one person and 37 had someone who was 65 or older. The average household size was 2.62 and the average family size was 2.92.

The age distribution was 78.1% over the age of 18 and 19.3% 65 or older. The median age was 43.5 years. The gender ratio was 50.1% male and 49.9% female. Among 135 occupied households, 121 were owner-occupied and 14 were renter-occupied.

At the 2000 census there were 461 people, 155 households, and 119 families in the town. The population density was 455.2 inhabitants per square mile (175.8/km^{2}). There were 171 housing units at an average density of 168.8 per square mile (65.2/km^{2}). The racial makeup of the town was 97.61% White, 1.08% Asian, and 1.30% from two or more races. Hispanic or Latino of any race were 0.87%.

Of the 155 households, 40.0% had children under the age of 18 living with them, 60.0% were married couples living together, 9.7% had a female householder with no husband present, and 22.6% were non-families. 19.4% of households were one person and 11.0% were one person aged 65 or older. The average household size was 2.76 and the average family size was 3.13.

The age distribution was 28.6% under the age of 18, 7.8% from 18 to 24, 25.4% from 25 to 44, 18.9% from 45 to 64, and 19.3% 65 or older. The median age was 36 years. For every 100 females, there were 92.1 males. For every 100 females age 18 and over, there were 81.8 males.

The median household income was $36,875, and the median family income was $40,313. Males had a median income of $27,143 versus $21,389 for females. The per capita income for the town was $12,269. About 21.2% of families and 22.6% of the population were below the poverty line, including 31.5% of those under age 18 and 8.0% of those age 65 or over.

== The Decker Press ==
From 1937 to 1950, Prairie City was home to the Decker Press, which in the mid-1940s was the largest publishing house in America devoted exclusively to putting out poetry. The business was not financially successful, and its founder, Prairie City native James A. Decker, sold it to a local lumber dealer, Harry M. Denman, who in turn sold it several months later to Ervin Tax, a poet from Chicago. Decker left town, but his sister, Dorothy, remained.

Tax tried to make the business more efficient and profitable—buying new presses and binding equipment and hiring an artist, sales promoter and other employees. But the Decker Press came to a tragic end in May 1950 when Dorothy, who had fallen in love with Tax in a one-side relationship, shot Tax in the head with a rifle and then killed herself.

== Education ==
Prairie City is part of the Bushnell-Prairie City Community Unit School District 170. Students attend Bushnell-Prairie City Elementary School, Bushnell-Prairie City Junior High School, and Bushnell-Prairie City High School which are all located in Bushnell.
