= Bardolph, Illinois =

- Village
- Location in McDonough County, Illinois
- Coordinates: 40°29′55″N 90°33′36″W
- Country: United States
- State: Illinois
- County: McDonough
- Townships: Macomb, Mound

Area
  - Total: 0.62 sq mi (1.60 km^{2})
  - Land: 0.62 sq mi (1.60 km^{2})
  - Water: 0 sq mi (0.00 km^{2})
- Elevation: 673 ft (205 m)

Population (2020)
  - Total: 210
  - Density: 340/sq mi (131.4/km^{2})
- Time zone: UTC-6 (CST)
  - Summer (DST): UTC-5 (CDT)
- ZIP code: 61416
- Area code: 309
- FIPS code: 17-03675
- GNIS feature ID: 2398032

Bardolph is a village in McDonough County, Illinois, United States. The population was 210 at the 2020 census, down from 251 in 2010.

== Geography ==
Bardolph is located in eastern McDonough County 8 miles (13 km) northeast of Macomb, the county seat.

According to the U.S. Census Bureau, Bardolph has a total area of 0.62 square miles (1.61 km^{2}), all land.

The principal street is Broadway, which runs parallel to the Burlington Northern Railroad. Melvin Kerr Tree Farm is on the west side of town.

== Demographics ==
Historical population
Census	Pop.	Note	%±
1880	409		—
1890	447		9.3%
1900	387		−13.4%
1910	285		−26.4%
1920	352		23.5%
1930	305		−13.4%
1940	275		−9.8%
1950	246		−10.5%
1960	266		8.1%
1970	331		24.4%
1980	294		−11.2%
1990	301		2.4%
2000	253		−15.9%
2010	251		−0.8%
2020	210		−16.3%
U.S. Decennial Census

As of the census of 2000, there were 253 people, 87 households, and 64 families residing in the village. The population density was 425.4 inhabitants per square mile (164.2/km^{2}). There were 102 housing units at an average density of 171.5 units per square mile (66.2 units/km^{2}). The racial makeup of the village was 100.00% White.

There were 87 households, out of which 47.1% had children under the age of 18 living with them, 52.9% were married couples living together, 18.4% had a female householder with no husband present, and 25.3% were non-families. 23.0% of all households were made up of individuals, and 10.3% had someone living alone who was 65 years of age or older. The average household size was 2.91 and the average family size was 3.34.

In the village, the population was spread out, with 34.4% under the age of 18, 12.6% from 18 to 24, 28.5% from 25 to 44, 16.6% from 45 to 64, and 7.9% who were 65 years of age or older. The median age was 27 years. For every 100 females, there were 83.3 males. For every 100 females age 18 and over, there were 93.0 males.

The median income for a household in the village was $25,833, and the median income for a family was $30,208. Males had a median income of $29,167 versus $17,083 for females. The per capita income for the village was $11,361. About 32.2% of families and 28.8% of the population were below the poverty line, including 46.8% of those under the age of eighteen and none of those 65 or over.

== Education ==
It is in the Macomb Community Unit School District 185. The comprehensive high school is Macomb High School.

== Notable person ==
- George W. Swink, businessman
