= Doddsville, Illinois =

- Unincorporated community
- Location within Illinois Location within the United States
- Coordinates: 40°16′42″N 90°39′06″W
- Country: United States
- State: Illinois
- County: McDonough
- Elevation: 682 ft (208 m)
- Time zone: UTC-6 (Central (CST))
  - Summer (DST): UTC-5 (CDT)
- Area code: 309
- GNIS feature ID: 422631

Doddsville is an unincorporated community in McDonough County, in the U.S. state of Illinois.

== History ==
Doddsville was laid out in the 1830s by Samuel Dodds, and named for him. A post office called Doddsville was established in 1839, and remained in operation until 1903.
