= Walnut Grove Township, McDonough County, Illinois =

Coordinates: 40°35′16″N 90°36′39″W

Walnut Grove Township
- Township
- Location in McDonough County

- McDonough County's location in Illinois
- Country: United States
- State: Illinois
- County: McDonough
- Established: November 4, 1856

Area
  - Total: 36.29 sq mi (94.0 km^{2})
  - Land: 36.29 sq mi (94.0 km^{2})
  - Water: 0 sq mi (0 km^{2}) 0%

Population (2010)
  - Estimate (2016): 447
  - Density: 12.9/sq mi (5.0/km^{2})
- Time zone: UTC-6 (CST)
  - Summer (DST): UTC-5 (CDT)
- FIPS code: 17-109-78591

Walnut Grove Township is located in McDonough County, Illinois. As of the 2010 census, its population was 469 and it contained 215 housing units.

== Geography ==
According to the 2010 census, the township has a total area of 36.29 square miles (94.0 km^{2}), all land.

== Demographics ==
Historical population
Census	Pop.	Note	%±
2016 (est.)	447
U.S. Decennial Census
