= Adair, Illinois =

Adair, Illinois Reedyville
- Census-designated place
- Location within Illinois Location within the United States
- Coordinates: 40°25′08″N 90°29′48″W
- Country: United States
- State: Illinois
- County: McDonough
- Township: New Salem

Area
  - Total: 0.43 sq mi (1.11 km^{2})
  - Land: 0.43 sq mi (1.11 km^{2})
  - Water: 0 sq mi (0.00 km^{2})
- Elevation: 646 ft (197 m)

Population (2020)
  - Total: 212
  - Density: 493.4/sq mi (190.51/km^{2})
- Time zone: UTC-6 (Central (CST))
  - Summer (DST): UTC-5 (CDT)
- ZIP code: 61411
- Area code: 309
- GNIS feature ID: 2628541

Adair is an unincorporated community and census-designated place (CDP) in McDonough County, Illinois, United States. It is part of New Salem Township. As of the 2020 census, Adair had a population of 212.

Adair was laid out in August 1870 under the name of "Reedyville"; though the name has never been officially changed, the location is known as Adair because that name was given to the post office.

Adair is in eastern McDonough County, along U.S. Route 136 (Main Street). US 136 leads northwest 11 miles (18 km) to Macomb, the county seat, and southeast 28 miles (45 km) to Havana. The Burlington Northern Santa Fe Railway runs through the east side of Adair.

== Demographics ==
Historical population
| Census | Pop. | Note | %± |
|---|---|---|---|
| 2010 | 210 | | — |
| 2020 | 212 | | 1.0% |
U.S. Decennial Census

== Education ==
It is in the Macomb Community Unit School District 185. The comprehensive high school is Macomb High School.
