= Eldorado Township, McDonough County, Illinois =

Coordinates: 40°19′19″N 90°30′19″W

Eldorado Township
- Township
- Location in McDonough County

- McDonough County's location in Illinois
- Country: United States
- State: Illinois
- County: McDonough
- Established: November 4, 1856

Area
  - Total: 36.53 sq mi (94.6 km^{2})
  - Land: 36.48 sq mi (94.5 km^{2})
  - Water: 0.05 sq mi (0.13 km^{2}) 0.14%

Population (2010)
  - Estimate (2016): 128
  - Density: 3.7/sq mi (1.4/km^{2})
- Time zone: UTC-6 (CST)
  - Summer (DST): UTC-5 (CDT)
- FIPS code: 17-109-22996

Eldorado Township is located in McDonough County, Illinois. As of the 2010 census, its population was 134 and it contained 85 housing units.

== Geography ==
According to the 2010 census, the township has a total area of 36.53 square miles (94.6 km^{2}), of which 36.48 square miles (94.5 km^{2}) (or 99.86%) is land and 0.05 square miles (0.13 km^{2}) (or 0.14%) is water.

Historical population
Census	Pop.	Note	%±
2016 (est.)	128
U.S. Decennial Census
