= Duncan Mills, Illinois =

- Unincorporated community
- Location within Illinois Location within the United States
- Coordinates: 40°20′24″N 90°11′27″W
- Country: United States
- State: Illinois
- County: Fulton
- Elevation: 479 ft (146 m)
- Time zone: UTC-6 (Central (CST))
  - Summer (DST): UTC-5 (CDT)
- Area code: 309
- GNIS feature ID: 407486

Duncan Mills is an unincorporated community in Fulton County, Illinois, United States. Duncan Mills is located at the junction of US 24, US 136, and IL 100 south of Lewistown.

== History ==
A post office called Duncans Mills was established in 1858, and remained in operation until 1905. The community was named for George Duncan, the owner of a local mill.
