= Tennessee, Illinois =

- Village
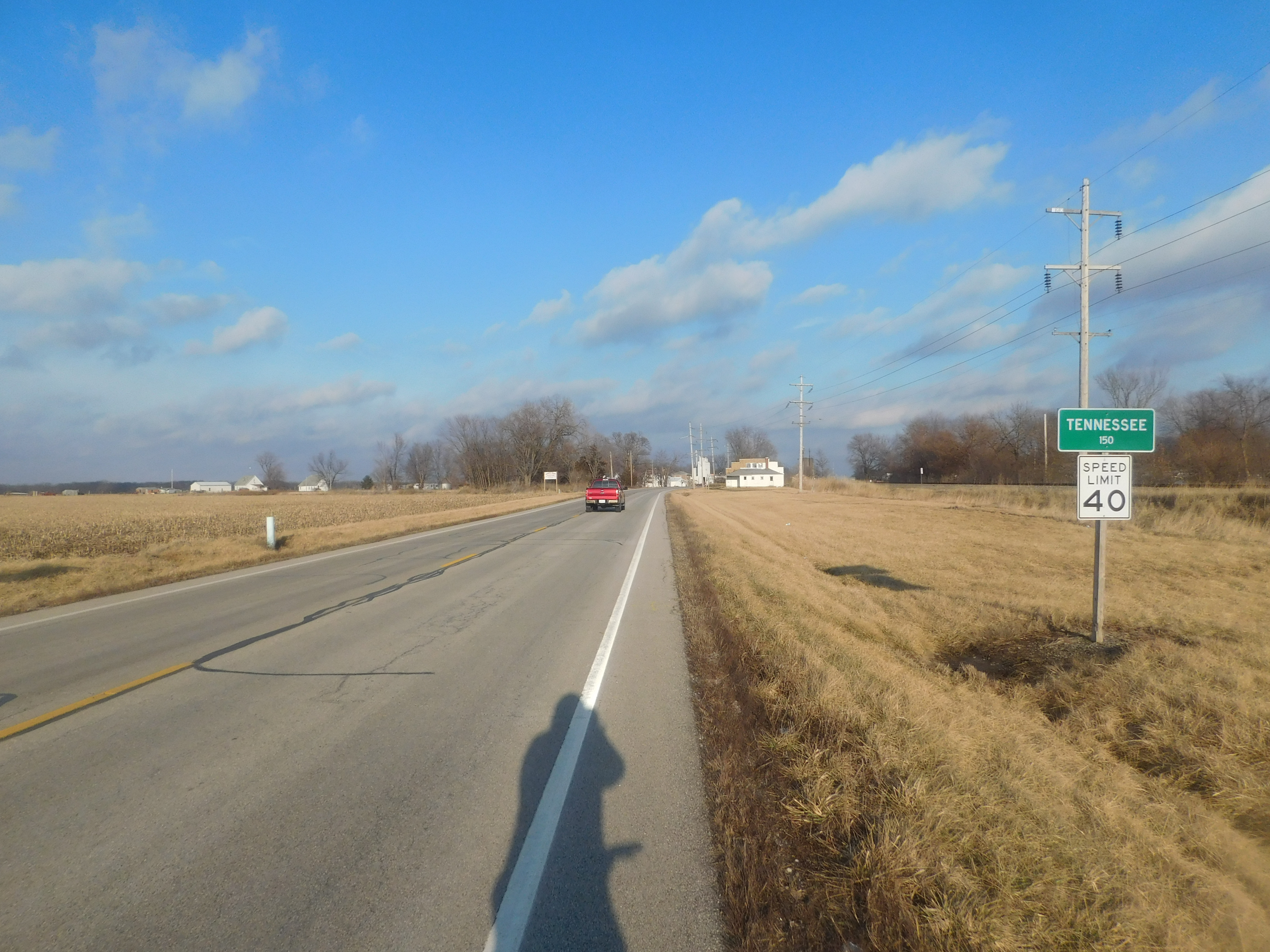
- U.S. Route 136 westbound approaching the village of Tennessee

- Location in McDonough County, Illinois
- Coordinates: 40°24′41″N 90°50′10″W
- Country: United States
- State: Illinois
- County: McDonough
- Township: Tennessee

Area
  - Total: 0.42 sq mi (1.10 km^{2})
  - Land: 0.42 sq mi (1.10 km^{2})
  - Water: 0 sq mi (0.00 km^{2})
- Elevation: 689 ft (210 m)

Population (2020)
  - Total: 101
  - Density: 237.4/sq mi (91.67/km^{2})
- Time zone: UTC-6 (CST)
  - Summer (DST): UTC-5 (CDT)
- ZIP code: 62374
- Area code: 309
- FIPS code: 17-74665
- GNIS feature ID: 2399960

Tennessee is a village in McDonough County, Illinois, United States. The population was 101 at the 2020 census.

== History ==
A post office called Tennessee has been in operation since 1856. The village was named after the state of Tennessee.

== Geography ==
Tennessee is located in western McDonough County. U.S. Route 136 passes through the village as Campbell Street, leading northeast 2.5 miles (4.0 km) to Colchester and 9 miles (14 km) to Macomb, the McDonough county seat. Carthage is 16 miles (26 km) to the west via US 136.

According to the U.S. Census Bureau, Tennessee has a total area of 0.43 square miles (1.11 km^{2}), all land.

== Demographics ==
Historical population
Census	Pop.	Note	%±
1880	262		—
1890	313		19.5%
1900	327		4.5%
1910	274		−16.2%
1920	252		−8.0%
1930	223		−11.5%
1940	243		9.0%
1950	249		2.5%
1960	206		−17.3%
1970	179		−13.1%
1980	175		−2.2%
1990	127		−27.4%
2000	144		13.4%
2010	115		−20.1%
2020	101		−12.2%
U.S. Decennial Census

As of the census of 2000, there were 144 people, 64 households, and 38 families residing in the village. The population density was 339.2 inhabitants per square mile (131.0/km^{2}). There were 70 housing units at an average density of 164.9 per square mile (63.7/km^{2}). The racial makeup of the village was 98.61% White, 0.69% Native American, and 0.69% from two or more races.

There were 64 households, out of which 25.0% had children under the age of 18 living with them, 50.0% were married couples living together, 7.8% had a female householder with no husband present, and 40.6% were non-families. 37.5% of all households were made up of individuals, and 20.3% had someone living alone who was 65 years of age or older. The average household size was 2.25 and the average family size was 2.95.

In the village, the population was spread out, with 22.2% under the age of 18, 6.9% from 18 to 24, 24.3% from 25 to 44, 27.1% from 45 to 64, and 19.4% who were 65 years of age or older. The median age was 41 years. For every 100 females, there were 94.6 males. For every 100 females age 18 and over, there were 89.8 males.

The median income for a household in the village was $27,188, and the median income for a family was $34,750. Males had a median income of $20,833 versus $23,000 for females. The per capita income for the village was $13,311. There were 9.8% of families and 22.3% of the population living below the poverty line, including 38.5% of under eighteens and none of those over 64.

== Education ==
Tennessee is part of the West Prairie Community Unit School District 103. Students attend elementary school at South Elementary and then Middle School which are both located in Colchester. Students then go on to attend West Prairie High School in Sciota.
