= McDonough County Courthouse =

Local government building in the United States

- U.S. National Register of Historic Places
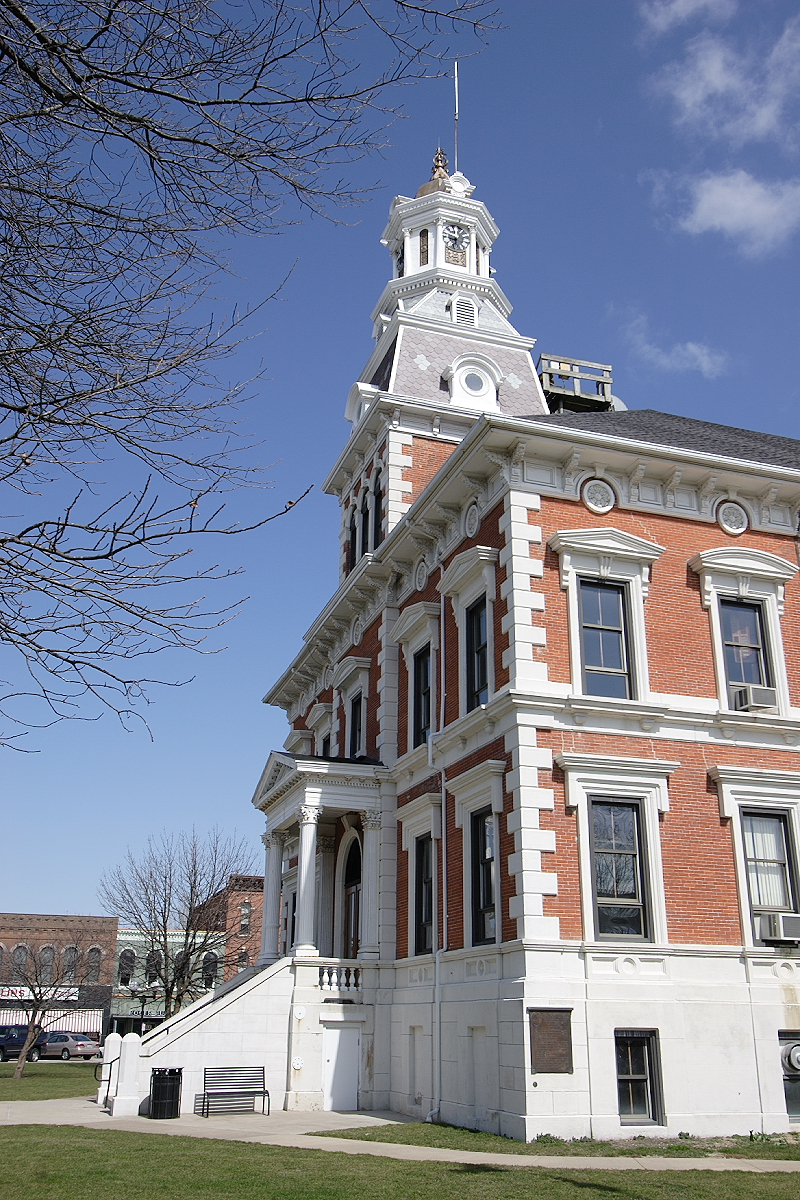
- The McDonough County Courthouse in Macomb, Illinois' public square.

- Location within Illinois Location within the United States
- Interactive map showing the location of McDonough County Courthouse
- Location: Public Sq., Macomb, Illinois
- Coordinates: 40°27′38″N 90°40′27″W
- Area: 2.6 acres (1.1 ha)
- Built: 1869
- Architect: Elijah E. Myers
- Architectural style: Second Empire
- NRHP reference No.: 72001448
- Added to NRHP: October 30, 1972

The McDonough County Courthouse is located in the McDonough County city of Macomb, in the U.S. state of Illinois. The courthouse was constructed in 1871. Architect Elijah E. Myers designed the building in the Second Empire style; the courthouse is one of the few remaining Second Empire buildings in the United States.

The courthouse was added to the National Register of Historic Places in 1972. In the late 1970s, the county rehabilitated the building to restore its original exterior.

The building houses the County Clerk, Treasurer and State's Attorney's Office among others.
