= Jarvis Township, Madison County, Illinois =

Jarvis Township
- Township

- Location of Illinois in the United States
- Coordinates: 38°42′27″N 89°52′14″W
- Country: United States
- State: Illinois
- County: Madison
- Settled: November 2, 1875

Area
  - Total: 35.84 sq mi (92.8 km^{2})
  - Land: 35.27 sq mi (91.3 km^{2})
  - Water: 0.56 sq mi (1.5 km^{2})
- Elevation: 541 ft (165 m)

Population (2010)
  - Estimate (2016): 14,390
  - Density: 403.5/sq mi (155.8/km^{2})
- Time zone: UTC-6 (CST)
  - Summer (DST): UTC-5 (CDT)
- FIPS code: 17-119-38245
- Website: jarvistownship.com

Jarvis Township is located in Madison County, Illinois, in the United States. As of the 2010 census, its population was 14,232 and it contained 5,540 housing units.

Jarvis Township was named in honor of John Jarvis, who made the first entry of land from the United States government on September 10, 1814 and died here on October 29, 1823. The township was first surveyed in 1806. The primary town when first started was known as Columbia and for some time its principal industry was the Jarvis grist mill, which supplied the milling needs for area farmers. In 1819, Columbia was expanded, platted, and its name was changed to Troy.

The first settlement within its present boundaries was made by Messrs. Moore and Gregg, who located near the present site of the Vandalia depot. In the spring of 1804 came Herman and Titus Gregg, natives of Kentucky, and Robert Seybold, a native of Virginia. Titus Gregg, in 1814, entered the north half and part of the south half, in all 520 acres, in section 4. Among those who settled soon after 1804 were: Wm. F. Purviance, John Jarvis, Robert McMahan, Jiesse Reniro, Wm. Hall, Sr., James Watt, Isham Vincent and others, all of whom settled here before the organization of the state in 1818.

Robert Seybold made an entry of 100 acres, part of the northwest quarter of section 1, in 1814. On May 1, 1815, Pierre Menard entered 160 acres in section I. The first burial in the township was that of John Grotts, who was interred in the spring of 1804. The first justice of the peace was Joseph Eberman, who was appointed soon after the War of 1812. The first supervisor elected in the township was prominent farmer Ignatius Riggin in 1876. The second military station in the county was established in Jarvis township a short distance from where Troy now stands.

In an address delivered by Dr. John S. Dewey at the United States centennial celebration in Troy on July 4, 1876, he stated that Jacob Gregg settled the old Baird place in 1804 and planted the old pear tree which up to that time was still standing, and in 1865 yielded a crop which was sold in Dubuque, Iowa, for $125. Philip Gregg settled the Julius A. Barnsback farm, Titus Gregg the place of Ignatius Riggin, John Gregg the place of James H. Taylor, and Herman Gregg on the present site of Troy. Robert Gregg made settlement in section 8, near John Gregg, and not far from the head of Cantine Creek.

== Geography ==
According to the 2010 census, the township has a total area of 35.84 square miles (92.8 km^{2}), of which 35.27 square miles (91.3 km^{2}) (or 98.41%) is land and 0.56 square miles (1.5 km^{2}) (or 1.56%) is water.

== Demographics ==
Historical population
Census	Pop.	Note	%±
2016 (est.)	14,390
U.S. Decennial Census
