= Bethel Township, McDonough County, Illinois =

Coordinates: 40°19′35″N 90°44′13″W

Bethel Township
- Township
- Location in McDonough County

- McDonough County's location in Illinois
- Country: United States
- State: Illinois
- County: McDonough
- Established: November 4, 1856

Area
  - Total: 36.64 sq mi (94.9 km^{2})
  - Land: 36.64 sq mi (94.9 km^{2})
  - Water: 0 sq mi (0 km^{2}) 0%

Population (2010)
  - Estimate (2016): 312
  - Density: 8.9/sq mi (3.4/km^{2})
- Time zone: UTC-6 (CST)
  - Summer (DST): UTC-5 (CDT)
- FIPS code: 17-109-05638

Bethel Township is located in McDonough County, Illinois. As of the 2010 census, its population was 327 and it contained 148 housing units.

== History ==
The first settler of Bethel Township was John Gibson, a native of the state of North Carolina, who settled in 1829, on section two. He built the first house within the limits of the present township near the village of Middletown.

Among other earliest settlers of Bethel township between 1829 and 1835 were: John Stoneking, Benjamin Matthews, James H. Dunsworth, Charles Dunsworth, James Edmonston, John Venard, William Venard, Malachi Monk, John Monk, Martin Fugate, John W. Fugate, James C. Archer, Thomas F. Shoopman, William I. Pace, Bowen Webb, Jesse C. Webb, John Matthews, Samuel T. Matthews, M. C. Foster, William Holton, George W. Provine, James L. Horrell, John McCormack, John Patrick, John E. Riggs, and Samuel Riggs.

Bethel township assumed official organization in 1856, at the time of the division of the county into townships. It was originally known as Eagle township, but was changed to its present cognomen at the first meeting of the board of supervisors in May, 1857. The first township election was held April 7, 1857, at which time William Twaddle and John Taylor were elected the first justices of the peace, and John Brundage, constable.

== Geography ==
According to the 2010 census, the township has a total area of 36.64 square miles (94.9 km^{2}), all land.

== Demographics ==
Historical population
Census	Pop.	Note	%±
2016 (est.)	312
U.S. Decennial Census
