= Isabel Township, Fulton County, Illinois =

Isabel Township
- Township
- Location in Fulton County

- Fulton County's location in Illinois
- Coordinates: 40°18′27″N 90°09′46″W
- Country: United States
- State: Illinois
- County: Fulton
- Established: November 6, 1849

Area
  - Total: 29.37 sq mi (76.1 km^{2})
  - Land: 29.23 sq mi (75.7 km^{2})
  - Water: 0.14 sq mi (0.36 km^{2}) 0.46%
- Elevation: 495 ft (151 m)

Population (2020)
  - Total: 175
  - Density: 5.99/sq mi (2.31/km^{2})
- Time zone: UTC-6 (CST)
  - Summer (DST): UTC-5 (CDT)
- ZIP codes: 61441, 61501, 61542 62644
- FIPS code: 17-057-37842

Isabel Township is one of twenty-six townships in Fulton County, Illinois, USA. At the 2020 census, its population was 175 and it contained 97 housing units.

== Administration history ==
Township Supervisors

Name	Year	Name	Year
Jeremiah Farris	1850-51	William Farris	1866-69
Robert Carter	1852-53	Josiah Hendee	1870
William Craig	1854-55	T.B. Duncan	1871
Alex Freeman	1856-57	John Lane	1872
Robert Carter	1858	Robert K. Walker	1873
Alex Freeman	1859	James M. Lane	1874-75
C.J. Dilworth	1860	Robert G. Mulica	1876
John Lane	1861-64	James Foutch	1877-79
William Craig	1865		

Town Clerks

- Jesse Benson..........1850 Robert G. Mulica..1872-73
- William Craig.....1860 Jesse Benson.........1874-77
- Jesse Benson......1861-69 Stephen J. Benson.1878
- Roland C. Benson..1870 Thomas Brown......1879
- Hugh Murrey... ......1871

== Local government ==
=== Township Supervisor ===
- Greg Juergens (2005–Present)
- Dennis Barr (2001-2005)
- Gary Crum (1989-2001) Appointed
- Larry Tarvin (?) Resigned
- Carl Gowdy (?)

=== Town Clerk ===
- Karen Hazzard (2018–Present) Appointed
- Janice Colglazier (2008-2018) Resigned moved out of the township
- Pat Robinson (1988-2008)

=== Road Commissioner ===
- David Howe (2018–Present) Appointed
- Robert Kessler (2017-2018) died August 25, 2018
- Gary Whitmore (2015-2017) Appointed
- Matt Stephens (2013-2015) Resigned
- Dennis Barr (2005-2013)
- Ed Weatherford (1997-2005)
- Carrol Weaver (1980-1997)

=== Trustees ===
- Monty Graham ( - Present)
- Craig Porter ( -Present)
- Tracy Tomm (2019–Present) Appointed
- Chase Evans (2017–Present)

=== Mailing Address ===
P.O. Box 168 Lewistown, IL. 61542

== Geography ==
According to the 2021 census gazetteer files, Isabel Township has a total area of 29.37 square miles (76.07 km^{2}), of which 29.23 square miles (75.71 km^{2}) (or 99.54%) is land and 0.14 square miles (0.36 km^{2}) (or 0.46%) is water.

=== Existing towns (unincorporated) ===
- Duncan Mills - Duncan's Mills is a small place of business with a post office on the Spoon River, deriving its name from the gris-tmill at the point formerly owned and operated by George Duncan, an early settler there, and a very highly respected citizen. From 1840 to 1855, perhaps for a greater length of time, his was the largest grist-mill within a radius of 15 to 20 miles.

=== Extinct towns ===
- Otto
- Spoon River village
- West Havana
- Point Isabel was an old shipping point on the Illinois River, at the mouth of the Spoon River and directly across from Havana, and was the southern terminus of the Fulton County Narrow Gauge railway connecting to Fairview and Galesburg.
- Bessler's Station (aka Barrett's Station) was a station on the Narrow Gauge Railroad until 1910.

=== Cemeteries ===
The township contains six cemeteries: Duncan, Farris, Foutch, Freeman, Kearney and Otto.

=== Major highways ===
- US Route 24
- US Route 136
- Illinois Route 78
- Illinois Route 100

== Demographics ==
As of the 2020 census there were 175 people, 99 households, and 99 families residing in the township. The population density was 5.96 inhabitants per square mile (2.30/km^{2}). There were 97 housing units at an average density of 3.30 per square mile (1.27/km^{2}). The racial makeup of the township was 97.71% White, 0.00% African American, 0.00% Native American, 0.00% Asian, 0.00% Pacific Islander, 1.14% from other races, and 1.14% from two or more races. Hispanic or Latino of any race were 0.57% of the population.

There were 99 households, out of which 31.30% had children under the age of 18 living with them, 100.00% were married couples living together, none had a female householder with no spouse present, and none were non-families. No households were made up of individuals. The average household size was 2.66 and the average family size was 2.66.

The township's age distribution consisted of 16.0% under the age of 18, 8.4% from 18 to 24, 6.1% from 25 to 44, 45.6% from 45 to 64, and 24.0% who were 65 years of age or older. The median age was 54.1 years. For every 100 females, there were 75.3 males. For every 100 females age 18 and over, there were 78.2 males.

The median income for a household in the township was $45,583, and the median income for a family was $45,583. Males had a median income of $26,146 versus $20,250 for females. The per capita income for the township was $23,640. None of the population was below the poverty line.

Historical population
Census	Pop.	Note	%±
2000	206		—
2010	192		−6.8%
2020	175		−8.9%
U.S. Decennial Census

== School districts ==
- Lewistown School District 97

== Political districts ==
- Illinois' 17th congressional district
- State House District 94
- State Senate District 47
