= Colchester Township, McDonough County, Illinois =

Coordinates: 40°24′48″N 90°47′24″W

Colchester Township
- Township
- Location in McDonough County

- McDonough County's location in Illinois
- Country: United States
- State: Illinois
- County: McDonough
- Established: November 4, 1856

Area
  - Total: 18.19 sq mi (47.1 km^{2})
  - Land: 18.07 sq mi (46.8 km^{2})
  - Water: 0.13 sq mi (0.34 km^{2}) 0.71%

Population (2010)
  - Estimate (2016): 1,742
  - Density: 101.7/sq mi (39.3/km^{2})
- Time zone: UTC-6 (CST)
  - Summer (DST): UTC-5 (CDT)
- FIPS code: 17-109-15391

Colchester Township is located in McDonough County, Illinois. As of the 2010 census, its population was 1,837 and it contained 896 housing units.

== Geography ==
According to the 2010 census, the township has a total area of 18.19 square miles (47.1 km^{2}), of which 18.07 square miles (46.8 km^{2}) (or 99.34%) is land and 0.13 square miles (0.34 km^{2}) (or 0.71%) is water.

== Demographics ==
Historical population
Census	Pop.	Note	%±
2016 (est.)	1,742
U.S. Decennial Census
