= Emmet Township, McDonough County, Illinois =

Coordinates: 40°29′52″N 90°44′10″W

Emmet Township
- Township
- Location in McDonough County

- McDonough County's location in Illinois
- Country: United States
- State: Illinois
- County: McDonough
- Established: November 4, 1856

Area
  - Total: 32.04 sq mi (83.0 km^{2})
  - Land: 32.03 sq mi (83.0 km^{2})
  - Water: 0 sq mi (0 km^{2}) 0%

Population (2010)
  - Estimate (2016): 1,224
  - Density: 40.2/sq mi (15.5/km^{2})
- Time zone: UTC-6 (CST)
  - Summer (DST): UTC-5 (CDT)
- FIPS code: 17-109-24101

Emmet Township is located in McDonough County, Illinois. As of the 2010 census, its population was 1,288 and it contained 584 housing units. It contains the census-designated place of Georgetown.

== Geography ==
According to the 2010 census, the township has a total area of 32.04 square miles (83.0 km^{2}), all land.

== Demographics ==
Historical population
Census	Pop.	Note	%±
2016 (est.)	1,224
U.S. Decennial Census
