= Hire Township, McDonough County, Illinois =

Coordinates: 40°30′11″N 90°50′45″W

Hire Township
- Township
- Location in McDonough County

- McDonough County's location in Illinois
- Country: United States
- State: Illinois
- County: McDonough
- Established: November 4, 1856

Area
  - Total: 37.83 sq mi (98.0 km^{2})
  - Land: 37.79 sq mi (97.9 km^{2})
  - Water: 0.04 sq mi (0.10 km^{2}) 0.11%

Population (2010)
  - Estimate (2016): 218
  - Density: 6.1/sq mi (2.4/km^{2})
- Time zone: UTC-6 (CST)
  - Summer (DST): UTC-5 (CDT)
- FIPS code: 17-109-35333

Hire Township is located in McDonough County, Illinois. As of the 2010 census, its population was 229 and it contained 117 housing units.

== Geography ==
According to the 2010 census, the township has a total area of 37.83 square miles (98.0 km^{2}), of which 37.79 square miles (97.9 km^{2}) (or 99.89%) is land and 0.04 square miles (0.10 km^{2}) (or 0.11%) is water.

== Demographics ==
Historical population
Census	Pop.	Note	%±
2016 (est.)	218
U.S. Decennial Census

== History ==
Hire was formerly known as Rock Creek Township. It was named Hire Township in 1857 after George Hire (1790-1881), who served in the Ohio Militia in the War of 1812, and was an Illinois State Legislator in 1856.
