= New Salem Township, McDonough County, Illinois =

Coordinates: 40°25′03″N 90°30′07″W

New Salem Township
- Township
- Location in McDonough County

- McDonough County's location in Illinois
- Country: United States
- State: Illinois
- County: McDonough
- Established: November 4, 1856

Area
  - Total: 36.23 sq mi (93.8 km^{2})
  - Land: 36.22 sq mi (93.8 km^{2})
  - Water: 0.02 sq mi (0.052 km^{2}) 0.06%

Population (2010)
  - Estimate (2016): 352
  - Density: 10.2/sq mi (3.9/km^{2})
- Time zone: UTC-6 (CST)
  - Summer (DST): UTC-5 (CDT)
- FIPS code: 17-109-52792

New Salem Township is located in McDonough County, Illinois. As of the 2010 census, its population was 369 and it contained 168 housing units. It is Township 5 North, Range 1 West of the Fourth Principal Meridian. It contains the census-designated place of Adair.

== Geography ==
According to the 2010 census, the township has a total area of 36.23 square miles (93.8 km^{2}), of which 36.22 square miles (93.8 km^{2}) (or 99.97%) is land and 0.02 square miles (0.052 km^{2}) (or 0.06%) is water.

== Demographics ==
Historical population
| Census | Pop. | Note | %± |
|---|---|---|---|
| 2016 (est.) | 352 |
U.S. Decennial Census
