= Bushnell Township, McDonough County, Illinois =

Coordinates: 40°33′45″N 90°30′17″W

Bushnell Township
- Township
- Location in McDonough County

- McDonough County's location in Illinois
- Country: United States
- State: Illinois
- County: McDonough
- Established: June 1866

Area
  - Total: 18.3 sq mi (47 km^{2})
  - Land: 18.29 sq mi (47.4 km^{2})
  - Water: 0.01 sq mi (0.026 km^{2}) 0.05%

Population (2010)
  - Estimate (2016): 3,091
  - Density: 178.9/sq mi (69.1/km^{2})
- Time zone: UTC-6 (CST)
  - Summer (DST): UTC-5 (CDT)
- FIPS code: 17-109-10123

Bushnell Township is located in McDonough County, Illinois. As of the 2010 census, its population was 3,272 and contained 1,511 housing units.

== Geography ==
According to the 2010 census, the township has a total area of 18.3 square miles (47 km^{2}), of which 18.29 square miles (47.4 km^{2}) (or 99.95%) is land and 0.01 square miles (0.026 km^{2}) (or 0.05%) is water.

== Demographics ==
Historical population
Census	Pop.	Note	%±
2016 (est.)	3,091
U.S. Decennial Census
