= Industry Township, McDonough County, Illinois =

Coordinates: 40°19′28″N 90°37′06″W

Industry Township
- Township
- Location in McDonough County

- McDonough County's location in Illinois
- Country: United States
- State: Illinois
- County: McDonough
- Established: November 4, 1856

Area
  - Total: 37.2 sq mi (96 km^{2})
  - Land: 37.19 sq mi (96.3 km^{2})
  - Water: 0.01 sq mi (0.026 km^{2}) 0.03%

Population (2010)
  - Estimate (2016): 697
  - Density: 19.7/sq mi (7.6/km^{2})
- Time zone: UTC-6 (CST)
  - Summer (DST): UTC-5 (CDT)
- FIPS code: 17-109-37452

Industry Township is located in McDonough County, Illinois. As of the 2010 census, its population was 733 and it contained 345 housing units.

== Geography ==
According to the 2010 census, the township has a total area of 37.2 square miles (96 km^{2}), of which 37.19 square miles (96.3 km^{2}) (or 99.97%) is land and 0.01 square miles (0.026 km^{2}) (or 0.03%) is water.

== Demographics ==
Historical population
Census	Pop.	Note	%±
2016 (est.)	697
U.S. Decennial Census
