= Colchester, Illinois =

- City
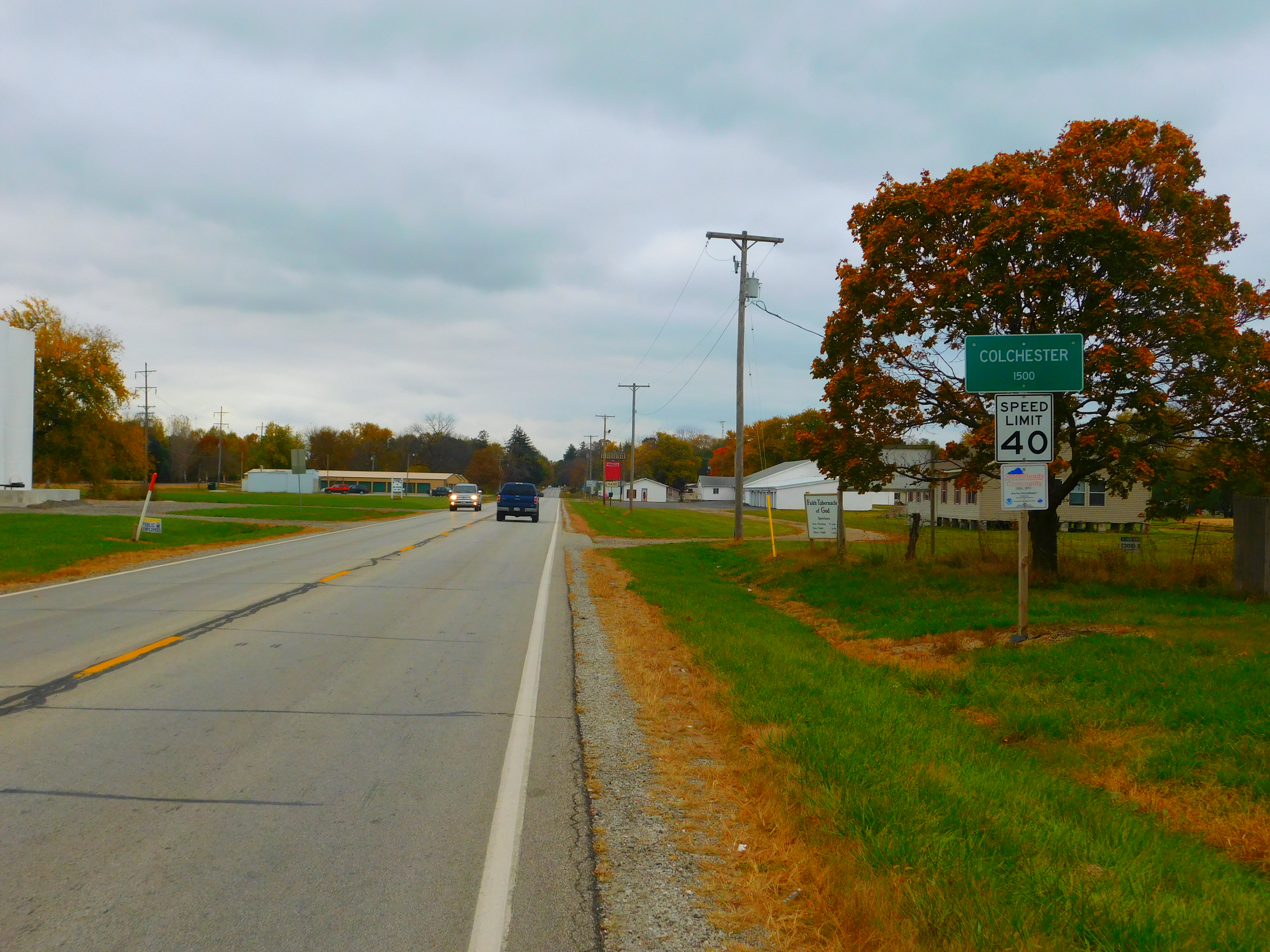
- U.S. Route 136 westbound entering Colchester

- Location in McDonough County, Illinois
- Coordinates: 40°25′32″N 90°47′32″W
- Country: United States
- State: Illinois
- County: McDonough
- Township: Colchester

Area
  - Total: 1.15 sq mi (2.98 km^{2})
  - Land: 1.15 sq mi (2.98 km^{2})
  - Water: 0 sq mi (0.00 km^{2})
- Elevation: 696 ft (212 m)

Population (2020)
  - Total: 1,108
  - Density: 963.2/sq mi (371.88/km^{2})
- Time zone: UTC-6 (CST)
  - Summer (DST): UTC-5 (CDT)
- ZIP code: 62326
- Area code: 309
- FIPS code: 17-15378
- GNIS feature ID: 2393589
- Website: cityofcolchesteril.gov

Colchester is a city in McDonough County, Illinois, United States. The population was 1,108 at the 2020 census, down from 1,401 in 2010. The city is named after the city of Colchester, England.

== History ==
Coal was discovered near Colchester in the 1850s.

According to the North American Stratigraphic Code, rock units were given names that included the geographic name of a location where the rock unit was first described. If the rock unit consisted of a dominant rock type, the rock type was included in the name. In this case, when coal was first discovered and described in Colchester, Illinois, the rock unit was named "Colchester Coal". When this particular coal unit was encountered in a different location, the coal was correctly identified as Colchester Coal.

The mines in Colchester attracted immigrants from Pennsylvania. At first these included the descendants of Irish Protestant refugees from the Irish Rebellion of 1798. Later they were joined by Irish Catholic refugees from the Great Famine.

During the 1920s, Colchester was the home of Henry "Kelly" Wagle, a bootlegger associated with Al Capone. Wagle was involved in the production of alcohol and its transportation between Chicago and Kansas City.

On September 11, 1921, members of the disgraced Chicago "Black Sox" baseball team played with the Colchester team in a game against nearby Macomb. Kelly Wagle paid to bring the players to Colchester.

== Geography ==
Colchester is located in western McDonough County. U.S. Route 136 passes through the center of town as Macomb Street and North Street, leading northeast 7 miles (11 km) to Macomb, the county seat, and west 19 miles (31 km) to Carthage. Illinois Route 110/336, a four-lane divided highway, bypasses Colchester to the south, joining US 136 3.5 miles (5.6 km) west of the city.

According to the U.S. Census Bureau, Colchester has a total area of 1.15 square miles (2.98 km^{2}), all land.

Argyle Lake State Park is 2 miles (3 km) north of Colchester.

== Demographics ==
Historical population
Census	Pop.	Note	%±
1880	1,067		—
1890	1,643		54.0%
1900	1,635		−0.5%
1910	1,445		−11.6%
1920	1,387		−4.0%
1930	1,342		−3.2%
1940	1,426		6.3%
1950	1,551		8.8%
1960	1,495		−3.6%
1970	1,747		16.9%
1980	1,729		−1.0%
1990	1,645		−4.9%
2000	1,493		−9.2%
2010	1,401		−6.2%
2020	1,108		−20.9%
U.S. Decennial Census

=== 2020 census ===
As of the 2020 census, Colchester had a population of 1,108. The median age was 47.2 years. 18.4% of residents were under the age of 18 and 22.7% of residents were 65 years of age or older. For every 100 females there were 97.5 males, and for every 100 females age 18 and over there were 94.0 males age 18 and over.

0.0% of residents lived in urban areas, while 100.0% lived in rural areas.

There were 534 households in Colchester, of which 20.0% had children under the age of 18 living in them. Of all households, 42.9% were married-couple households, 20.0% were households with a male householder and no spouse or partner present, and 29.6% were households with a female householder and no spouse or partner present. About 35.6% of all households were made up of individuals and 16.6% had someone living alone who was 65 years of age or older.

There were 607 housing units, of which 12.0% were vacant. The homeowner vacancy rate was 1.6% and the rental vacancy rate was 11.1%.

Racial composition as of the 2020 census
Race	Number	Percent
White	1,074	96.9%
Black or African American	0	0.0%
American Indian and Alaska Native	4	0.4%
Asian	1	0.1%
Native Hawaiian and Other Pacific Islander	0	0.0%
Some other race	2	0.2%
Two or more races	27	2.4%
Hispanic or Latino (of any race)	5	0.5%

=== 2000 census ===
At the 2000 census, there were 1,493 people, 634 households and 419 families residing in the city. The population density was 1,500.7 inhabitants per square mile (579.4/km^{2}). There were 694 housing units at an average density of 697.6 per square mile (269.3/km^{2}). The racial makeup of the city was 99.40% White, 0.07% Native American, 0.07% Asian, and 0.47% from two or more races. Hispanic or Latino of any race were 0.60% of the population.

There were 634 households, of which 29.8% had children under the age of 18 living with them, 50.8% were married couples living together, 12.1% had a female householder with no husband present, and 33.8% were non-families. 30.6% of all households were made up of individuals, and 13.2% had someone living alone who was 65 years of age or older. The average household size was 2.32 and the average family size was 2.89.

22.9% of the population were under the age of 18, 9.8% from 18 to 24, 27.6% from 25 to 44, 22.6% from 45 to 64, and 17.0% who were 65 years of age or older. The median age was 38 years. For every 100 females, there were 85.9 males. For every 100 females age 18 and over, there were 78.4 males.

The median household income was $31,283 and the median family income was $37,763. Males had a median income of $27,857 compared with $19,211 for females. The per capita income for the city was $15,354. About 5.0% of families and 7.3% of the population were below the poverty line, including 8.8% of those under age 18 and 5.9% of those age 65 or over.

== Education ==
Colchester is part of the West Prairie Community Unit School District 103. Students attend elementary school at South Elementary and then Middle School which are both located in Colchester. Students used to go on to attend West Prairie High School in Sciota but the middle school and highschool have merged into a 7th/12th grade school and the elementary is pre-k/6th.

== Notable people ==
- Lucy Smith Millikin (1821–1882), youngest sister of Mormon leader Joseph Smith; longtime resident of Colchester
