= Scotland Township, McDonough County, Illinois =

Coordinates: 40°24′41″N 90°36′51″W

Scotland Township
- Township
- Location in McDonough County

- McDonough County's location in Illinois
- Country: United States
- State: Illinois
- County: McDonough
- Established: November 4, 1856

Area
  - Total: 35.68 sq mi (92.4 km^{2})
  - Land: 35.63 sq mi (92.3 km^{2})
  - Water: 0.05 sq mi (0.13 km^{2}) 0.14%

Population (2010)
  - Estimate (2016): 427
  - Density: 12.6/sq mi (4.9/km^{2})
- Time zone: UTC-6 (CST)
  - Summer (DST): UTC-5 (CDT)
- FIPS code: 17-109-68250

Scotland Township is located in McDonough County, Illinois. As of the 2010 census, its population was 448 and it contained 192 housing units.

== Geography ==
According to the 2010 census, the township has a total area of 35.68 square miles (92.4 km^{2}), of which 35.63 square miles (92.3 km^{2}) (or 99.86%) is land and 0.05 square miles (0.13 km^{2}) (or 0.14%) is water.

== Demographics ==
Historical population
| Census | Pop. | Note | %± |
|---|---|---|---|
| 2016 (est.) | 427 |
U.S. Decennial Census
