= McDonough County, Illinois =

County in Illinois, United States

- County
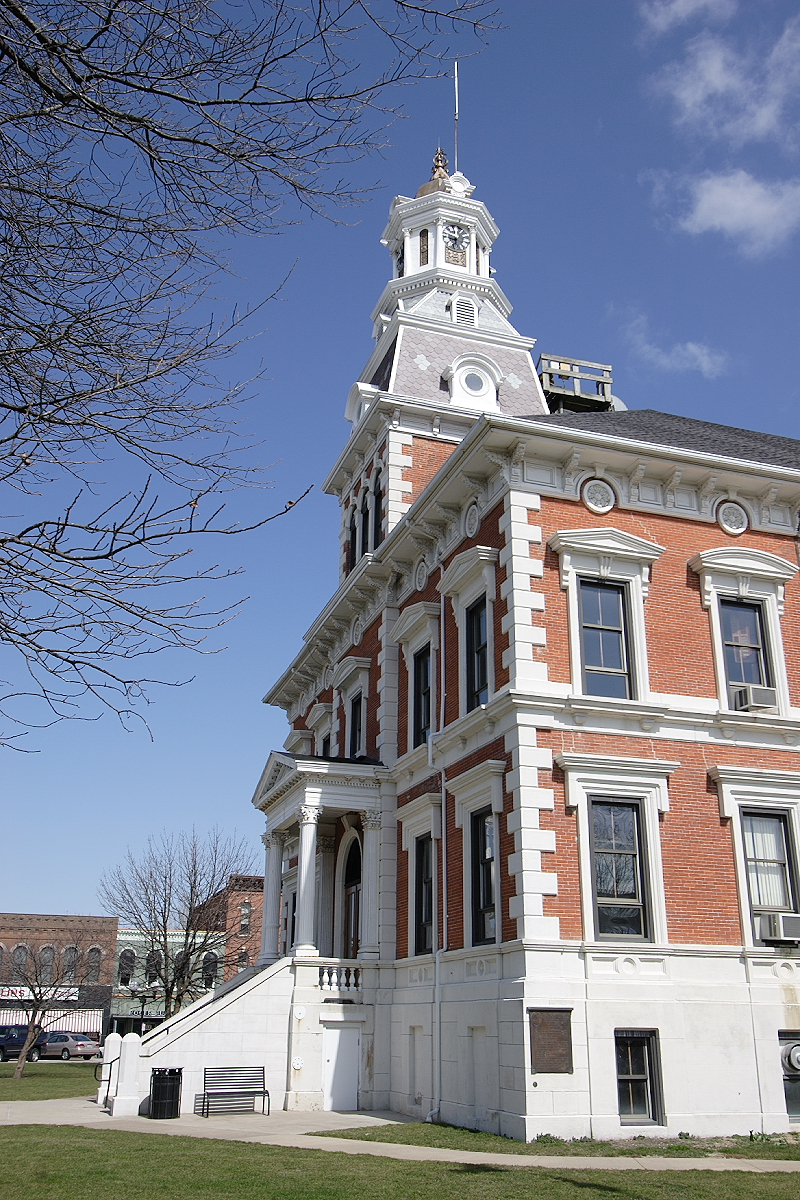
- McDonough County Courthouse, 2006

- Flag

- Location within the U.S. state of Illinois
- Coordinates: 40°28′N 90°41′W
- Country: United States
- State: Illinois
- Founded: January 25, 1826
- Named for: Thomas Macdonough
- Seat: Macomb
- Largest city: Macomb

Area
  - Total: 590 sq mi (1,500 km^{2})
  - Land: 589 sq mi (1,530 km^{2})
  - Water: 0.8 sq mi (2.1 km^{2}) 0.1%

Population (2020)
  - Total: 27,238
  - Estimate (2025): 25,916 ▼
  - Density: 46.2/sq mi (17.9/km^{2})
- Time zone: UTC−6 (Central)
  - Summer (DST): UTC−5 (CDT)
- Congressional districts: 15th, 17th
- Website: mcg.mcdonough.il.us

McDonough County is a county in the U.S. state of Illinois. According to the 2020 census, it had a population of 27,238. Its county seat is Macomb, which is also the home of Western Illinois University.

McDonough County is part of the Macomb, IL Micropolitan Statistical Area.

== History ==
McDonough County is named in honor of Thomas Macdonough who defeated a British squadron in the decisive naval Battle of Lake Champlain in the War of 1812. McDonough County was part of the "Military Tract" set aside by Congress for veterans of the War of 1812.

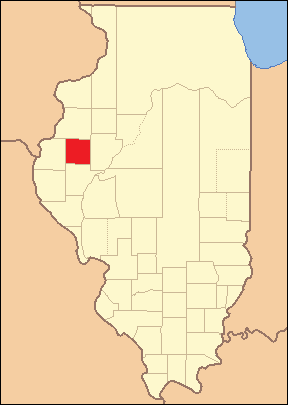
McDonough County at the time of its creation in 1826

== Geography ==
According to the U.S. Census Bureau, the county has a total area of 590 square miles (1,500 km^{2}), of which 589 square miles (1,530 km^{2}) is land and 0.8 square miles (2.1 km^{2}) (0.1%) is water.

The county has the unusual distinction of forming a perfect square by Mercator map projection. The county seat, Macomb, is in the center of the county, and the courthouse is almost precisely in the center of the county.

=== Climate and weather ===
Macomb, Illinois

Climate chart (precipitation, max. and min. temperature)
J	F	M	A	M	J	J	A	S	O	N	D
1.5 32 13	1.7 38 18	2.9 50 29	3.8 62 39	4.6 73 50	4.4 83 60	4.5 87 64	3.5 85 62	4 77 54	2.9 66 42	3.2 50 31	2.3 36 19
- █ Average max. and min. temperatures in °F
- █ Precipitation totals in inches
- Source: The Weather Channel
Metric conversion
J	F	M	A	M	J	J	A	S	O	N	D
37 0 −11	43 3 −8	73 10 −2	97 17 4	116 23 10	111 28 16	115 31 18	90 29 17	101 25 12	72 19 6	80 10 −1	58 2 −7
- █ Average max. and min. temperatures in °C
- █ Precipitation totals in mm

In recent years, average temperatures in the county seat of Macomb have ranged from a low of 13 °F (−11 °C) in January to a high of 87 °F (31 °C) in July, although a record low of −30 °F (−34 °C) was recorded in February 1905 and a record high of 113 °F (45 °C) was recorded in August 1934. Average monthly precipitation ranged from 1.47 inches (37 mm) in January to 4.58 inches (116 mm) in May.

=== Public transit ===
- Go West Transit
- Macomb Amtrak station

=== Major highways ===
- US 67
- US 136
- IL 9
- IL 41
- IL 61
- IL 95
- IL 110 (CKC)
- IL 336

=== Adjacent counties ===
- Henderson County - northwest
- Warren County - north
- Fulton County - east
- Schuyler County - south
- Hancock County - west

== Demographics ==
Historical population
Census	Pop.	Note	%±
1840	5,308		—
1850	7,616		43.5%
1860	20,069		163.5%
1870	26,509		32.1%
1880	27,970		5.5%
1890	27,467		−1.8%
1900	28,412		3.4%
1910	26,887		−5.4%
1920	27,074		0.7%
1930	27,329		0.9%
1940	26,944		−1.4%
1950	28,199		4.7%
1960	28,928		2.6%
1970	36,653		26.7%
1980	37,467		2.2%
1990	35,244		−5.9%
2000	32,913		−6.6%
2010	32,612		−0.9%
2020	27,238		−16.5%
2025 (est.)	25,916	▼	−4.9%
U.S. Decennial Census; 1790-1960 1900-1990; 1990-2000 2010

=== 2020 census ===
As of the 2020 census, the county had a population of 27,238 and a median age of 37.0 years; 18.2% of residents were under the age of 18 and 19.9% were 65 years of age or older. For every 100 females there were 94.4 males, and for every 100 females age 18 and over there were 91.7 males age 18 and over.

The racial makeup of the county was 85.7% White, 5.6% Black or African American, 0.2% American Indian and Alaska Native, 2.1% Asian, <0.1% Native Hawaiian and Pacific Islander, 1.6% from some other race, and 4.8% from two or more races. Hispanic or Latino residents of any race comprised 3.5% of the population.

57.5% of residents lived in urban areas, while 42.5% lived in rural areas.

There were 11,479 households in the county, of which 23.5% had children under the age of 18 living in them. Of all households, 40.4% were married-couple households, 22.4% were households with a male householder and no spouse or partner present, and 30.0% were households with a female householder and no spouse or partner present. About 37.1% of all households were made up of individuals and 15.5% had someone living alone who was 65 years of age or older.

There were 13,609 housing units, of which 15.7% were vacant. Among occupied housing units, 62.2% were owner-occupied and 37.8% were renter-occupied. The homeowner vacancy rate was 3.5% and the rental vacancy rate was 17.2%.

=== Racial and ethnic composition ===
McDonough County, Illinois – Racial and ethnic composition Note: the US Census treats Hispanic/Latino as an ethnic category. This table excludes Latinos from the racial categories and assigns them to a separate category. Hispanics/Latinos may be of any race.
Race / Ethnicity (NH = Non-Hispanic)	Pop 1980	Pop 1990	Pop 2000	Pop 2010	Pop 2020	% 1980	% 1990	% 2000	% 2010	% 2020
White alone (NH)	35,730	32,810	30,284	28,979	23,062	95.36%	93.09%	92.01%	88.86%	84.67%
Black or African American alone (NH)	968	1,226	1,126	1,594	1,498	2.58%	3.48%	3.42%	4.89%	5.50%
Native American or Alaska Native alone (NH)	30	53	39	52	47	0.08%	0.15%	0.12%	0.16%	0.17%
Asian alone (NH)	297	791	662	572	560	0.79%	2.24%	2.01%	1.75%	2.06%
Native Hawaiian or Pacific Islander alone (NH)	x	x	10	2	6	x	x	0.03%	0.01%	0.02%
Other race alone (NH)	150	6	12	27	73	0.40%	0.02%	0.04%	0.08%	0.27%
Mixed race or Multiracial (NH)	x	x	292	519	1,030	x	x	0.89%	1.59%	3.78%
Hispanic or Latino (any race)	292	358	488	867	962	0.78%	1.02%	1.48%	2.66%	3.53%
Total	37,467	35,244	32,913	32,612	27,238	100.00%	100.00%	100.00%	100.00%	100.00%

=== 2010 census ===
As of the 2010 United States census, there were 32,612 people, 13,057 households, and 6,724 families residing in the county. The population density was 55.3 inhabitants per square mile (21.4/km^{2}). There were 14,419 housing units at an average density of 24.5 per square mile (9.5/km^{2}). The racial makeup of the county was 90.4% white, 5.0% black or African American, 1.8% Asian, 0.2% American Indian, 0.7% from other races, and 1.8% from two or more races. Those of Hispanic or Latino origin made up 2.7% of the population. In terms of ancestry, 25.0% were German, 14.7% were American, 13.7% were Irish, 12.7% were English, and 5.1% were Italian.

Of the 13,057 households, 22.0% had children under the age of 18 living with them, 40.0% were married couples living together, 8.0% had a female householder with no husband present, 48.5% were non-families, and 33.9% of all households were made up of individuals. The average household size was 2.19 and the average family size was 2.80. The median age was 28.9 years.

The median income for a household in the county was $33,702 and the median income for a family was $52,390. Males had a median income of $42,297 versus $28,530 for females. The per capita income for the county was $18,344. About 12.8% of families and 23.7% of the population were below the poverty line, including 21.7% of those under age 18 and 9.4% of those age 65 or over.

== Communities ==
=== Cities ===
- Bushnell
- Colchester
- Macomb (seat)

=== Villages ===
- Bardolph
- Blandinsville
- Good Hope
- Industry
- Plymouth (partial)
- Prairie City
- Sciota
- Tennessee

=== Census-designated places ===
- Adair
- Georgetown

=== Other unincorporated place ===
- Colmar
- Doddsville
- Fandon
- Hills Grove
- New Philadelphia
- Scottsburg
- Vishnu Springs
- Walnut Grove

=== Townships ===
- Bethel Township
- Blandinsville Township
- Bushnell Township
- Chalmers Township
- Colchester Township
- Eldorado Township
- Emmet Township
- Hire Township
- Industry Township
- Lamoine Township
- Macomb Township
- Macomb City Township
- Mound Township
- New Salem Township
- Prairie City Township
- Sciota Township
- Scotland Township
- Tennessee Township
- Walnut Grove Township

== Education ==
The following K-12 school districts include parts of McDonough County:

McDonough County is served by three school districts and two colleges:

- West Prairie Community Unit School District 103
- Bushnell Prairie City Community Unit School District 170
- Macomb Community Unit School District 185
- Schuyler-Industry Community Unit School District 5
- Southeastern Community Unit School District 337
- V.I.T. Community Unit School District 2
- West Central Community Unit School District 235

There is also a portion of the county in the La Harpe Community School District 347 (elementary school district) and the Illini West High School District 307.

These two colleges are in the county:

- Spoon River College, Macomb campus
- Western Illinois University

== Politics ==
United States presidential election results for McDonough County, Illinois
Year	Republican		Democratic		Third party(ies)	
Year	No.	%	No.	%	No.	%
1892	3,319	46.73%	3,237	45.57%	547	7.70%
1896	4,036	51.16%	3,684	46.70%	169	2.14%
1900	4,076	52.71%	3,444	44.54%	213	2.75%
1904	4,041	55.36%	2,730	37.40%	528	7.23%
1908	3,733	51.05%	3,112	42.56%	467	6.39%
1912	1,876	26.90%	2,959	42.44%	2,138	30.66%
1916	7,192	53.08%	5,740	42.36%	617	4.55%
1920	7,221	63.18%	3,930	34.38%	279	2.44%
1924	7,505	60.99%	4,016	32.63%	785	6.38%
1928	8,953	68.15%	4,104	31.24%	81	0.62%
1932	6,329	44.87%	7,608	53.94%	168	1.19%
1936	8,723	54.48%	7,138	44.58%	151	0.94%
1940	10,326	63.67%	5,783	35.66%	108	0.67%
1944	9,028	66.30%	4,497	33.03%	91	0.67%
1948	8,058	65.13%	4,206	33.99%	109	0.88%
1952	10,126	72.06%	3,922	27.91%	5	0.04%
1956	9,725	71.48%	3,872	28.46%	8	0.06%
1960	9,363	67.39%	4,520	32.53%	10	0.07%
1964	6,907	52.92%	6,144	47.08%	0	0.00%
1968	8,496	65.74%	3,785	29.29%	643	4.98%
1972	10,573	67.18%	5,143	32.68%	22	0.14%
1976	9,683	62.33%	5,464	35.17%	387	2.49%
1980	8,995	61.66%	4,093	28.06%	1,501	10.29%
1984	9,383	67.02%	4,561	32.58%	57	0.41%
1988	7,173	57.42%	5,247	42.00%	73	0.58%
1992	5,297	38.05%	5,814	41.76%	2,811	20.19%
1996	5,049	41.95%	5,632	46.80%	1,354	11.25%
2000	6,465	49.68%	6,080	46.73%	467	3.59%
2004	7,656	51.28%	7,119	47.69%	154	1.03%
2008	6,055	46.32%	6,783	51.89%	234	1.79%
2012	6,147	49.36%	5,967	47.91%	340	2.73%
2016	6,795	51.70%	5,288	40.23%	1,061	8.07%
2020	7,027	57.00%	4,992	40.50%	308	2.50%
2024	6,987	58.10%	4,736	39.38%	302	2.51%

McDonough County is split between Illinois’ 15th Congressional District and Illinois' 17th Congressional District, with the majority of the county in the 15th. The Cities of Macomb and Bardolph are included in the 17th district, and the cities of Bushnell, Colchester, Prairie City, Good Hope, Sciota, Industry and Adair are in the 15th district. The 15th District is currently represented by Republican Mary Miller. The 17th District is currently represented by Democrat Eric Sorenson. For the Illinois House of Representatives, the county is yet again split between the 71st district and the 94th district. The Cities of Macomb, Bushnell, Bardolph, and Prairie City are represented by Republican Daniel Swanson of the 71st district. The cities of Colchester, Industry, Good Hope, Sciota, and Adair are currently represented by Republican Norine Hammond of the 94th district. The county is split along the same lines in the Illinois House as it is in the Illinois Senate, thus the 71st district of the house's lines are the same as the 36th district of the Illinois Senate. The 36th district of the Illinois Senate is represented by Democrat Michael Halpin. The 47th district of the Illinois Senate is represented by Republican Neil Anderson.

In presidential elections, McDonough County was once reliably Republican, voting for the Republican candidate in all but two elections (1912 & 1932) from 1892 to 1988. Since 1988, the county has become more competitive, with Democrats carrying the county three out of seven times and holding the Republican candidate's margin of victory to under four points three times. In 2020, however, McDonough County went for Trump by a margin of 16.5%, and in 2024 by nearly 19%.

== See also ==
- National Register of Historic Places listings in McDonough County, Illinois
