= Mound Township, McDonough County, Illinois =

Coordinates: 40°29′54″N 90°30′05″W

Mound Township
- Township
- Location in McDonough County

- McDonough County's location in Illinois
- Country: United States
- State: Illinois
- County: McDonough
- Established: November 4, 1856

Area
  - Total: 36.21 sq mi (93.8 km^{2})
  - Land: 36.21 sq mi (93.8 km^{2})
  - Water: 0 sq mi (0 km^{2}) 0%

Population (2010)
  - Estimate (2016): 270
  - Density: 7.8/sq mi (3.0/km^{2})
- Time zone: UTC-6 (CST)
  - Summer (DST): UTC-5 (CDT)
- FIPS code: 17-109-50738

Mound Township is located in McDonough County, Illinois. As of the 2010 census, its population was 283 and it contained 122 housing units.

== Geography ==
According to the 2010 census, the township has a total area of 36.21 square miles (93.8 km^{2}), all land.

== Demographics ==
Historical population
Census	Pop.	Note	%±
2016 (est.)	270
U.S. Decennial Census
