= Chalmers Township, McDonough County, Illinois =

Coordinates: 40°24′33″N 90°43′22″W

Chalmers Township
- Township
- Location in McDonough County

- McDonough County's location in Illinois
- Country: United States
- State: Illinois
- County: McDonough
- Established: November 4, 1856

Area
  - Total: 26.64 sq mi (69.0 km^{2})
  - Land: 26.63 sq mi (69.0 km^{2})
  - Water: 0.01 sq mi (0.026 km^{2}) 0.04%

Population (2010)
  - Estimate (2016): 644
  - Density: 25.8/sq mi (10.0/km^{2})
- Time zone: UTC-6 (CST)
  - Summer (DST): UTC-5 (CDT)
- FIPS code: 17-109-12333

Chalmers Township is located in McDonough County, Illinois. As of the 2010 census, its population was 686 and it contained 326 housing units.

== Geography ==
According to the 2010 census, the township has a total area of 26.64 square miles (69.0 km^{2}), of which 26.63 square miles (69.0 km^{2}) (or 99.96%) is land and 0.01 square miles (0.026 km^{2}) (or 0.04%) is water.

== Demographics ==
Historical population
Census	Pop.	Note	%±
2016 (est.)	644
U.S. Decennial Census
