= Macomb Township, McDonough County, Illinois =

Coordinates: 40°30′27″N 90°36′20″W

Macomb Township
- Township
- Location in McDonough County

- McDonough County's location in Illinois
- Country: United States
- State: Illinois
- County: McDonough
- Established: November 4, 1856

Area
  - Total: 32.63 sq mi (84.5 km^{2})
  - Land: 32.63 sq mi (84.5 km^{2})
  - Water: 0 sq mi (0 km^{2}) 0%

Population (2010)
  - Estimate (2016): 18,352
  - Density: 15.4/sq mi (5.9/km^{2})
- Time zone: UTC-6 (CST)
  - Summer (DST): UTC-5 (CDT)
- FIPS code: 17-109-45915

Macomb Township is located in McDonough County, Illinois. As of the 2010 census, its population was 502 and it contained 248 housing units.

== Geography ==
According to the 2010 census, the township has a total area of 32.63 square miles (84.5 km^{2}), all land.

== Demographics ==
Historical population
Census	Pop.	Note	%±
2016 (est.)	18,352
U.S. Decennial Census
