= Tennessee Township, McDonough County, Illinois =

Coordinates: 40.412°N 90.839°W

Tennessee Township
- Township
- Location in McDonough County

- McDonough County's location in Illinois
- Country: United States
- State: Illinois
- County: McDonough
- Established: November 4, 1856

Area
  - Total: 28.65 sq mi (74.2 km^{2})
  - Land: 28.64 sq mi (74.2 km^{2})
  - Water: 0.01 sq mi (0.026 km^{2}) 0.03%

Population (2010)
  - Estimate (2016): 321
  - Density: 11.7/sq mi (4.5/km^{2})
- Time zone: UTC-6 (CST)
  - Summer (DST): UTC-5 (CDT)
- FIPS code: 17-109-74678

Tennessee Township is located in McDonough County, Illinois. As of the 2010 census, its population was 336 and it contained 180 housing units.

== Geography ==
According to the 2010 census, the township has a total area of 28.65 square miles (74.2 km^{2}), of which 28.64 square miles (74.2 km^{2}) (or 99.97%) is land and 0.01 square miles (0.026 km^{2}) (or 0.03%) is water.

== Demographics ==
Historical population
Census	Pop.	Note	%±
2016 (est.)	321
U.S. Decennial Census
