= Kent Slater =

American politician

Kent Slater (born November 25, 1945) is a former American judge and politician.

Born in Hampton, Iowa, Slater served in the United States Army from 1969 to 1971 and was stationed in South Vietnam. He received his bachelor's degree in agriculture from the University of Illinois and then received his J.D. degree from John Marshall Law School. He then practiced law in Macomb, Illinois. From 1985 to 1988, Slater served in the Illinois House of Representatives and was a Republican.

In 1988, Slater chose to run for a judgeship on the Illinois Circuit Court in the Ninth Circuit. Slater won. For the Illinois House seat, Democratic candidate Bill Edley defeated former Senator Ken McMillan by approximately 2,000 votes. Slater resigned to take his judgeship and was succeeded by Leroy A. Ufkes for the period between Slater's resignation and Edley's inauguration.

From 1988 to 1990, Slater served as a judge from the Ninth Circuit. The Ninth Circuit is composed of Knox, Henderson, Warren, Hancock, McDonough, and Fulton counties. Then, from 1990 until 2006, Slater served on the Illinois Appellate Court from the Third District. At the end of his tenure, he was the Presiding Judge for the Third District.

On October 28, 2019, Governor J. B. Pritzker appointed Slater to the Illinois Health Facilities and Services Review Board for a term starting August 5, 2019 and ending July 1, 2020. The Board, through its certificate of need program aimed at containing health care costs, approves or disapproves applicationsfor construction or expansion of health care facilities to avoid unnecessary duplication of such facilities and promotes development of facilities in areas where needed. On February 22, 2022, Pritzker appointed Stacy Grundy to succeed Kent Slater. She was confirmed February 22, 2022.
