= Phil Hare =

American politician (born 1949)

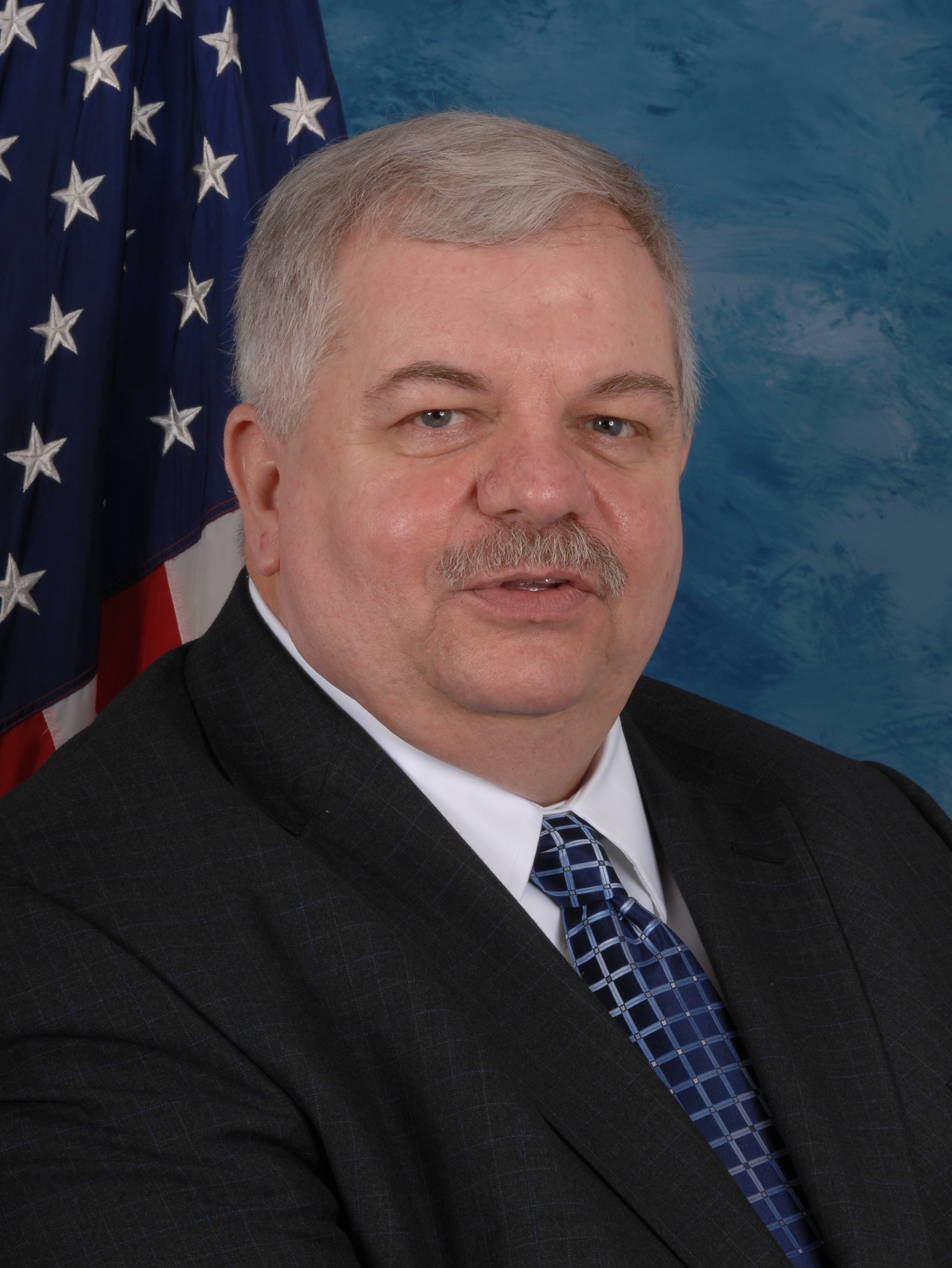
- Official portrait, 2007

Member of the U.S. House of Representatives from Illinois's 17th district
- In office January 3, 2007 – January 3, 2011
- Preceded by: Lane Evans
- Succeeded by: Bobby Schilling

Personal details
- Born: Philip Gary Hare; February 21, 1949 (age 77) Galesburg, Illinois, U.S.
- Party: Democratic
- Spouse: Rebecca Hare
- Children: 2
- Education: Black Hawk College

Military service
- Branch/service: United States Army
- Years of service: 1969–1975
- Unit: United States Army Reserves

Philip Gary Hare (born February 21, 1949) is an American politician who was U.S. Representative for Illinois's 17th congressional district, serving from 2007 until 2011. He is a member of the Democratic Party. The district was based in Illinois's share of the Quad Cities area and included Rock Island, Moline, Quincy, Decatur, Galesburg and part of Springfield.

== Early life, education, and early political career ==
Hare was born in Galesburg but grew up in Rock Island. He graduated from Alleman High School in 1967. The son of a machinist, Hare went to work at Seaford Clothing Factory in Rock Island, where he stayed for 13 years. He received his A.A. degree at Black Hawk College in Moline, Illinois. While working there Hare served as a union leader and was President of HERE Local 617. He served in the U.S. Army Reserves from 1969 to 1975.

Hare began his political career in 1980 when he ran as an alternate delegate to the Democratic National Convention in support of the presidential candidacy of Senator Edward Kennedy of Massachusetts. He was one of six candidates running for alternate delegate but the three Kennedy delegates were defeated by the three candidates supporting President Jimmy Carter.

== Working for Lane Evans ==
In 1982 Hare left his union position to help his friend Lane Evans, who was running for the U.S. House of Representatives in an attempt to unseat 16-year incumbent Republican Tom Railsback. (Hare had first met Evans in 1976 when the two were volunteers in U.S. Senator Fred R. Harris's campaign for president.) Railsback was upset by conservative State Senator Kenneth McMillan in the Republican primary; Evans defeated McMillan in November, and appointed Hare as district director.

For the next 24 years, Hare worked as an aide to Evans, assisting the congressman primarily on constituent issues and labor problems. In the last few years of Evans's time in Congress, Hare attended several speaking engagements and even debated Evans's opponents in 2002 and 2004 because of the congressman's Parkinson's disease, which often prevented Evans from participating.

== U.S. House of Representatives ==
=== Elections ===
2006

Evans decided to retire in March 2006 and Hare announced his candidacy shortly afterward. In a special Democratic caucus of precinct committee members from across the 17th Congressional District, Hare received his former boss's endorsement and prevailed over the four other candidates to replace Evans as the Democratic nominee. In the November election, Hare defeated his Republican opponent, Andrea Zinga, with 57% of the vote.

2008

Hare ran unopposed in 2008.

2010

Hare was challenged by Republican nominee Bobby Schilling and Green Party nominee Roger K. Davis. The race was rated a tossup by the Cook Political Report, CQ Politics, and the New York Times. By October, RealClearPolitics rated it "Leans Republican".

In the November 2 election, Schilling defeated Hare 53%-42%. Hare lost his home county, the normally solidly Democratic Rock Island County, by 9 percentage points.

=== Tenure ===
Hare's voting record was generally liberal, mirroring that of his former boss, Evans. Hare is also a founding member of the LGBT Equality Caucus and was a member of the Congressional Progressive Caucus, of which Evans was a founding member.

Health care

Hare has been an advocate for health-care reform since becoming a congressman on Memorial Day, May 29, 2006. During the summer of 2009, Hare took a hard-line stance on a public health insurance option, saying, "I will not support any plan that does not contain a robust public option because a plan without a public option is sort of like a car without a motor. It may look good on the outside, but in the end it will get you nowhere." After many local health care town halls and public polling, Hare backed off of his support of the public option. Hare has said he ultimately supports a public option but that it [the public option] "is not a deal-breaker".

Labor

Hare is a supporter of organized labor, including the living wage and the Employee Free Choice Act. In 2010, he introduced the Jobs Through Procurement Act, which opposed government acquisition of goods produced through sweatshop labor.

Abortion

Hare has consistently supported access to and funding for contraception, as well as keeping most methods of abortion legal. He has received the endorsement of NARAL Pro-Choice America.

Controversies

Phil Hare has been accused of distorting his military service. Hare served in the Army Reserves in the United States during the Vietnam War with 160 days of active duty, 20 days short of meeting the federal government's definition of "veteran". Hare said: "... all of the people who served in the National Guard and Reserves when I did that got a honorable discharge are indeed veterans."

In June 2010, Ken Moffett, a Vietnam veteran and supporter of Hare's Republican challenger Bobby Schilling, called Hare a "draft dodger" during a Memorial Day ceremony in East Moline, Illinois. The mayor of East Moline said that Moffett "accosted" Hare during a "solemn day and ceremony". Moffett accused Hare of ordering a staffer to follow Moffett to his car and get Moffett's license plate number; Hare described the encounter as: "I teased him by saying if he didn't want to tell me his name I'd just go get it off his plate."

At an April 2010 town hall meeting, Hare stated on camera, "I don't worry about the Constitution on this to be honest," in relation to Congressional health-care reform efforts. The cameraman, who was affiliated with the St. Louis Tea Party, was heard to say "jackpot, brother!" after Hare said this, to which Hare responded, "Oh, please." Hare's communications director, Tim Schlittner, later explained that Hare's quote was "taken out of context" and he meant that "he is not worried about this health care law being ruled unconstitutional." However, in the same interview, Hare said, "I believe it (the Constitution) says 'life, liberty and the pursuit of happiness.'" When it was pointed out to him that was actually from the Declaration of Independence, Hare said, "It doesn't matter to me."

=== Committee assignments ===
- Committee on Education and Labor
  - Subcommittee on Health, Employment, Labor, and Pensions
  - Subcommittee on Workforce Protections
- Committee on Transportation and Infrastructure
  - Subcommittee on Highways and Transit
  - Subcommittee on Water Resources and Environment

== Election history ==
- Nomination of precinct committeepersons U.S. House 2006
  - Phil Hare — 17,011 — 64%
  - John M. Sullivan — 7,530 — 28%
  - Mark Schwiebert — 1,370 — 5%
  - Michael Boland — 612 — 2%
  - Rob Mellon — 98 — 0%
- Election of November 7, 2006 for U.S. House Dist. 17
  - Phil Hare (D) — 114,638 — 57%
  - Andrea Zinga (R) — 85,734 — 43%
- Election of November 4, 2008 for U.S. House Dist. 17
  - Phil Hare (D) — 220,961 — 99.77%
  - Mark E. Lioen — 517 — 0.23%
- Election of November 2, 2010 for U.S. House Dist. 17
  - Bobby Schilling (R) — 104,583 — 52.6%
  - Phil Hare (D) — 85,454 — 43%
  - Roger K. Davis (G) — 8,861 — 4.5%

== Personal life ==
Hare and his wife Beckie currently live in Rock Island and have two grown children, Amy and Louis.

Hare appeared on the March 15, 2007 episode of The Colbert Report in the show's "Better Know a District" series.

U.S. House of Representatives
Preceded by Lane Evans	Member of the U.S. House of Representatives from Illinois's 17th congressional district 2007–2011	Succeeded by Bobby Schilling
U.S. order of precedence (ceremonial)
Preceded by David D. Phelps as Former U.S. Representative	Order of precedence of the United States as Former U.S. Representative	Succeeded by Robert Dold as Former U.S. Representative
