= Bobby Schilling =

American politician (1964–2021)

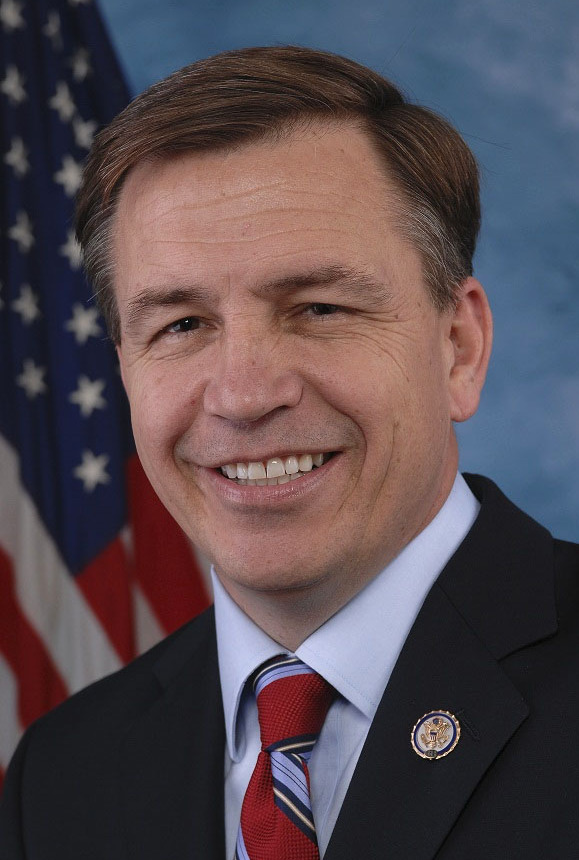
- Official portrait, 2011

Member of the U.S. House of Representatives from Illinois's 17th district
- In office January 3, 2011 – January 3, 2013
- Preceded by: Phil Hare
- Succeeded by: Cheri Bustos

Personal details
- Born: Robert Todd Schilling; January 23, 1964 Rock Island, Illinois, U.S.
- Died: April 6, 2021 (aged 57) LeClaire, Iowa, U.S.
- Party: Republican
- Other political affiliations: Democratic (formerly)
- Spouse: Christie Schilling
- Children: 10
- Education: Black Hawk College

Robert Todd Schilling (January 23, 1964 – April 6, 2021) was an American businessman and politician who served as a U.S. representative for Illinois's 17th congressional district from 2011 to 2013. Schilling was a member of the Republican Party. Schilling challenged incumbent Democrat Phil Hare in the 2010 election and defeated him by ten points. In the 2012 election, he was defeated by Democrat Cheri Bustos. In 2014, he ran for his former seat but lost again to Bustos.

After relocating from Illinois to Iowa, he again ran for public office in 2020 for Iowa's 2nd congressional district. He lost the Republican primary to state senator Mariannette Miller-Meeks; this was the last election he competed in prior to his death.

== Early life, education, and business career ==
Schilling was born and raised in Rock Island, Illinois. He graduated from Alleman Catholic High School and attended Black Hawk College.

Schilling worked at Container Corporation of America between 1983 and 1987 and was a union steward for the local chapter of the United Paper Workers International Union. He then worked as an insurance agent for Prudential Insurance Company between 1987 and 1995, where he was ranked in the top 5% of all Prudential agents during his last year. He was also the treasurer for the United Food and Commercial Workers Union for four of those years.

In 1996, Schilling and his wife opened Saint Giuseppe's Heavenly Pizza in Moline, Illinois. Schilling ran the restaurant until he became a member of Congress, when he left his son in charge. According to public personal financial disclosures, Schilling's restaurant dropped in value in the early 2010s from a range of $100,000 to $250,000 down to between $50,000–$100,000. Schilling's son and campaign manager Terry Schilling said, "The real estate market has really taken a hit in East Moline. It just goes to show that Bobby Schilling has a real stake in this economy."

== U.S. House of Representatives ==
=== Elections ===
==== 2010 ====
Schilling grew up as a Democrat, but became more conservative over the years and characterized himself as a "Reagan Republican." He was also influenced by radio and television personality Glenn Beck. Schilling was one of the 9–12 Candidates, a group led by Beck, and signed the 9–12 contract of principles and values. Schilling has said he was inspired to run for office because he was preparing to franchise his restaurant, but cancelled his plans when he saw then-Presidential candidate Barack Obama telling Joe the Plumber that the government needed to "spread the wealth around." Schilling announced his candidacy in April 2009 and officially filed for the Republican nomination in October 2009. Schilling was unopposed in the primary election.

Schilling vowed not to participate in the congressional pension program, to keep his private health insurance instead of the congressional plan, to donate any pay raises he received, to limit himself to no more than eight years in Congress, and not to vote for any bill he had not read. "I'm not going to make a career out of this," he said.

Early in Schilling's campaign, political websites rated the 17th District race "safe Democratic." However, by Election Day the race was rated "leans Republican" by RealClearPolitics, Cook Political Report, CQ Politics, and The New York Times. The race was profiled on CNN as one of the country's top 100 House races. CNN reported, "Schilling trails in the overall money race, but he's raised enough to get his message out and give the incumbent something to worry about." In September 2010, Schilling was named to the National Republican Congressional Committee's "Young Guns" program.

Schilling's Democratic opponent, incumbent Phil Hare, criticized Schilling for living 0.99 miles outside the 17th District, though the Constitution only requires members of Congress to live within the state they wish to represent. Schilling's wife noted that the family's restaurant was located in the district, and that it employed people and paid taxes there. She asserted that gerrymandering had caused the family's home to fall outside district lines.

Schilling was endorsed by the Quincy Tea Party group; John Deere PAC; the United States Chamber of Commerce. U.S. Representative Aaron Schock (R-IL); and former Governor of Massachusetts Mitt Romney.

Newspapers were evenly divided in endorsing Schilling over Hare, with the Chicago Tribune and the Sauk Valley News among those supporting Schilling. In October 2010, Schilling was endorsed by the Chicago Tribune.

In the general election, Schilling won by an unexpectedly large margin, taking 53 percent of the vote to Hare's 43 percent. Notably, he carried Hare's home county, Rock Island County—a normally heavily Democratic county that is home to the district's two largest cities, Moline and Rock Island—by nine points.

Schilling's campaign set an off-year fundraising record for a challenger in the 17th district, amassing about $89,000 in 2009. Schilling's campaign fundraising relied largely on individual donors, who accounted for about 80 percent of the $1 million raised by his campaign. Hare depended more heavily on political action committees, who contributed about two-thirds of his campaigns $1.3 million total. Following his election, Schilling relied more on political action committees to help retire his campaign debt, with the bulk of his December 2010 fundraising coming from PACs, including Wal-Mart, the American Medical Association, Caterpillar Inc. and Archer Daniels Midland Co. Schilling ended the campaign with a total of $1,095,167 raised and $1,078,911 spent.

After the election, Schilling hired as his chief of staff Mike Roman, a political consultant known for posting a video showing alleged voter intimidation during the 2008 presidential election. Roman, along with policy director Scott Tranter, resigned from Schilling's office in April 2011.

==== 2012 ====
Schilling ran for re-election in 2012 and faced Democrat and former East Moline City Council Alderwoman Cheri Bustos in the general election. He has been added to the National Republican Congressional Committee's Patriot Program, which is designed to defend incumbent Republicans. Bustos received a significant assist from the 2010 round of redistricting. The 17th already had a modest Democratic lean, but the Democratic-controlled legislature redrew the district to make it even more Democratic. Notably, Quincy, Decatur and the district's share of Springfield were cut out, replaced by the more Democratic portions of Peoria and Rockford. National Journal's Cook Political Report named Schilling one of the top 10 Republicans most vulnerable to redistricting in 2012.

Schilling has raised $1.4 million and had $950,000 cash on hand as of June 30, 2011.

While initially rated as a "lean-Democrat" race by major sites, in September 2012, Roll Call, the Cook Political Report, and the Rothenburg Political Report upgraded the race to "toss-up", with Cook saying Schilling had an advantage.

Schilling was endorsed by the Chicago Tribune, the Rockford Register Star, former Congressman Tom Railsback, the National Federation of Independent Business, and the Galesburg Register-Mail, among other endorsements.

In the November 2012 elections, Bustos defeated Schilling by a 53.3% to 46.7% margin. According to the Seattle Post Intelligencer, Schilling was "looking forward to focusing again on his pizza business after losing a second term."

==== 2014 ====
It was widely expected by political analysts that Schilling would challenge Bustos to reclaim the seat in 2014. On July 8, 2013, he officially announced his candidacy for his former seat in the 2014 election. In his announcement, he said Bustos has been failing the middle class, and criticized her for not supporting any budget plans in the legislature.

According to The Hill, Schilling "historically has not been a strong fundraiser but is known as a skilled grassroots campaigner." During 2013, Bustos raised approximately $1.1 million and Schilling raised approximately $297,000.

Schilling was endorsed by the Chicago Tribune.

Schilling was defeated in the November 4 general election by Bustos, 55.5% to 44.5%.

==== 2020 ====
Schilling announced he would run as a Republican for Iowa's 2nd District after incumbent representative Dave Loebsack, a Democrat who was first elected in 2006, announced he would retire. He lost the Republican primary to Mariannette Miller-Meeks, a state senator and the Republican nominee in 2008, 2010, and 2014.

=== Tenure ===
Schilling's wife and 10 children attended the congressional swearing-in on January 5, 2011, attracting some notice and an interview with Diane Sawyer. His early actions as a congressman included joining 25 other freshman Republicans in voting against extending the USA PATRIOT Act, claiming that the 45 minutes allotted for floor debate was inadequate to discuss these concerns.

In February 2011, Schilling joined 130 House Republicans in voting against a $450 million budget cut for an extra F-35 fighter-jet engine—a project that the U.S. Department of Defense had repeatedly tried to kill, and that Defense Secretary Robert Gates called "a waste of nearly 3 billion." Schilling voted for a package of cuts that included a $230 million federal grant to build an Amtrak line from Chicago to Iowa City, though he had supported the project during his campaign, calling it "critically important to both the economy and the environment of the Midwest." The planned rail line was a celebrated project by many in his district, including local mayors. Schilling defended his vote, arguing it was a question of prioritizing, separating wants from needs, and when he looked at the big picture, the rail service did not make the cut. He also stated that his constituents elected him to address national debt and deficit problems in Washington, not to take a business-as-usual approach.

In June 2011, Schilling introduced a bill to prevent members of Congress from receiving their congressional pension before they reach the Social Security retirement age.

During the 2011 debt ceiling crisis, Schilling voted to raise the debt ceiling.

In October 2011, a California resident issued a death threat promising a reward to anyone who assassinated Schilling. The threat is being investigated by the FBI and the United States Capitol Police. Schilling said he was advised by authorities to "lay low" while they investigated the threat and a spokeswoman for Schilling said the Schilling family was taking the "recommended precautions". According to The Hill, the person behind the threat may be the one behind similar threats against George W. Bush, several high-ranking current and former security and defense officials, and Rep. Mike Coffman of Colorado. Schilling said, "It's a general threat to all members of Congress, but they specifically called my name out in the threat. You just don't know what people are thinking...It's something we're not going to take lightly."

Schilling gave the Republican response to the President's weekly radio address on October 29, 2011.

In September 2012, Schilling was given the "Friend of Agriculture Award" by the Stephenson County Farm Bureau. In October 2012, he was given the "No Labels Problem Solvers Seal".

=== Political positions ===
Schilling was considered to be a Tea Party candidate in the 2010 election. He held the following positions:

- He was pro-life, and spoke at the 2011 March for Life.
- He said the federal government should stop regulating education and that local schools should be under local control.
- He supported repealing the Democrats' version of health care reform, believing it unconstitutional. He supported tort reform and legalizing the purchase of insurance across state lines.
- He was fiscally conservative and believed in small government.
- He supported term limits for members of Congress.
- He supported lowering the corporate tax rate.
- He supported a troop surge in the War in Afghanistan, and he opposed bringing Guantanamo Bay detainees to Thomson, Illinois; instead he supported bringing the detainees to trial before military courts rather than the U.S. civilian, federal courts.

=== Committee assignments ===
- Committee on Agriculture
  - Subcommittee on General Farm Commodities and Risk Management
  - Subcommittee on Rural Development, Research, Biotechnology, and Foreign Agriculture
- Committee on Armed Services
  - Subcommittee on Readiness
  - Subcommittee on Emerging Threats and Capabilities
- Committee on Small Business

== Electoral history ==
2010 General Election, 17th Congressional District, Illinois
Party	Candidate	Votes	%
Republican	Bobby Schilling	104,583	52.58
Democratic	Phil Hare	85,454	42.96
Green	Roger K. Davis	8,861	4.46
Total votes		198,898	100

2012 General Election, 17th Congressional District, Illinois
Party	Candidate	Votes	%
Democratic	Cheri Bustos	153,519	53.28
Republican	Bobby Schilling	134,623	46.72
Independent	Write-in candidates	19	0.007
Total votes		288,161	100

Illinois's 17th Congressional District, 2014
Party	Candidate	Votes	%
Democratic	Cheri Bustos (Incumbent)	110,560	55.46
Republican	Bobby Schilling	88,785	44.53
Independent	Bill Fawell	16	0.01
Total votes		199,361	100
Democratic hold			

2020 Republican Primary Election, 2nd Congressional District, Iowa
Party	Candidate	Votes	%
Republican	Mariannette Miller-Meeks	23,052	47.6
Republican	Bobby Schilling	17,582	36.3
Republican	Steven Everly	2,806	5.8
Republican	Rick Phillips	2,444	5.1
Republican	Tim Borchardt	2,370	4.9
Write-in		161	0.3
Total votes		48,415	100.0

== Personal life ==
Schilling was married to Christie Schilling. He had ten children, the youngest of whom was born in February 2010, and several grandchildren.

Schilling died from cancer on April 6, 2021, having been initially diagnosed in May 2020. He was a resident of LeClaire, Iowa, at the time of his death.

U.S. House of Representatives
Preceded by Phil Hare	Member of the U.S. House of Representatives from Illinois's 17th congressional district 2011–2013	Succeeded by Cheri Bustos
