= Leroy A. Ufkes =

American lawyer and politician

Leroy Arthur Ufkes (September 8, 1923 – October 18, 2011) was an American lawyer and politician.

Born in Bear Creek Township, Hancock County, Illinois, Ufkes graduated from Carthage High School, Carthage, Illinois, in 1940. Ufkes served in the United States Army during World War II and was honorably discharged with the rank of first lieutenant. He received his bachelor's degree from Carthage College. Ufkes also went to Texas Tech University and Louisiana State University to study engineering. In 1950, Ufkes received his law degree from the University of Iowa College of Law. Ufkes practiced law in Carthage, Illinois and also served as an Illinois special state assistant attorney general. Ufkes was a longtime activist with the Republican Party.

When Kent Slater resigned from the Illinois House of Representatives, Ufkes was appointed by the Republican county party chairs from Fulton, Hancock, Henderson, McDonough and Schuyler by a weighted vote to complete Slater's term. He served in the 85th General Assembly for two days, from January 9 to January 11, 1989. During his two-day tenure, he voted to extend a program to help individuals in poverty pay their utility bills. The measure passed unanimously. Bill Edley, who defeated Kenneth G. McMillan in the 1988 election, succeeded Ufkes.

Ufkes died at a hospital in Carthage, Illinois on October 18, 2011.

== Notes ==
Preceded by Kent Slater	Member of the Illinois House of Representatives from the 95th district January 9, 1989 to January 11, 1989	Succeeded by Bill Edley
