= 2010 Illinois's 17th congressional district election =

- November 2, 2010
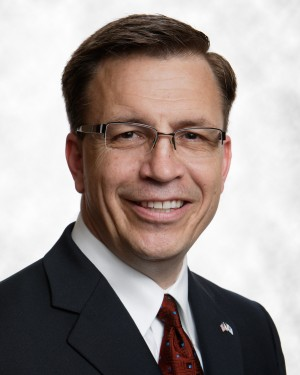

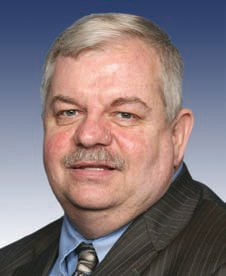
Candidate	Bobby Schilling	Phil Hare
Party	Republican	Democratic
Popular vote	104,583	85,454
Percentage	52.5%	42.9%
- County results Shilling: 40–50% 50–60% 60–70% 70–80% Hare: 40–50% 50–60%
Representative before election
Phil Hare
Democratic
Elected Representative
Bobby Schilling
Republican

The 2010 Illinois's 17th congressional district election was held on November 2, 2010 to determine who would represent Illinois's 17th District in the 112th United States Congress. The seat contested was located in western and parts of central Illinois. Democratic incumbent Phil Hare had held the seat since 2006 and was running for re-election. The Republican nominee was Bobby Schilling. The Green Party nominee was Roger K. Davis.

Schilling won the election in an upset with almost 53% of the vote.

== Race ==
=== Background ===
Hare was elected in 2006 with 57% of the vote and was unopposed in United States elections, 2008. Schilling is a restaurateur and owns Saint Giuseppe's Heavenly Pizza in East Moline, Illinois, which he started in 1997. Both were unopposed in their respective primaries.

Once thought to be safe by political analysts, Hare's seat was in trouble in the summer of 2010 as Schilling made his challenge. The New York Times's final rating was "Tossup", as was that of CQ Politics. RealClearPolitics's final rating was "Leans Democrat". FiveThirtyEight gave Schilling a 63% chance of winning. Politico rated it #5 on its list of "hottest House races in the country".

Though both were unopposed in their respective primaries, primary elections were still held as voters went to the polls to vote in other races. Out of 64,141 total votes cast in each party for the February 2nd Illinois primary, Hare took 32,496 votes (50.66%) to Schilling's 31,645 (49.34%). "After the results of yesterday’s election, one thing is clear: voters are ready for a clean break from the failed ideas of the past," Schilling said after the primary. "Voter turnout shows that my Democrat opponent and I nearly had identical votes." Because of the close results, National Review said the race is "worth keeping an eye on."

=== General election campaign ===
National organizations were heavily involved in the race, with the National Republican Congressional Committee injecting $350,000 into the race and the conservative American Future Fund buying $500,000 worth of ads in the district, both on behalf of Schilling. The Republican National Committee funded the opening of a "Victory Center" similar to that used for the campaign of Sen. Scott Brown in 2010. On Hare's side, the Democratic Congressional Campaign Committee bought $90,000 worth of airtime and SEIU bought $317,000 for similar commercials alleging Schilling wants to send jobs overseas, which the Schilling campaign denies.

Schilling's campaign outraised Hare's by $51,000 in Q3 2010 and had more cash on hand than Hare as of September 30.

All three candidates participated in one televised debate on October 26, which covered topics ranging from social security, taxes, and job creation to abortion and stem cell research.

=== Endorsements ===
Schilling received the endorsements of the Illinois Federation for the Right to Life PAC, the Republican National Coalition for Life PAC, the Quincy Tea Party, Congressman Aaron Schock, Congressman John Shimkus, Sgt. John F. Baker, Jr., recipient of the Medal of Honor, Rep. Michele Bachmann, CatholicVote PAC, former Governor of Massachusetts Mitt Romney, John Deere PAC, the Chicago Tribune, and the United States Chamber of Commerce.

Hare was endorsed by the Sierra Club and Veterans of Foreign Wars.

=== Fundraising ===
Figures are final as of December 31, 2010.

Candidate (Party)	Receipts	Disbursements	Cash On Hand	Debt
Phil Hare (D)	$1,364,578	$1,759,078	$1,837	$11,487
Bobby Schilling (R)	$1,127,490	$1,117,731	$9,759	$54,039
Roger K. Davis (G)	$0	$0	$0	$0
Source: Federal Election Commission

== Polling ==
Poll Source	Dates Administered	Phil Hare (D)	Bobby Schilling (R)	Roger K. Davis (G)	Undecided
The Hill	October 12–14, 2010	38%	45%	-	14%
NRCC internal poll via Washington Post	Unavailable	41%	44%	Unavailable	Unavailable
Public Opinion Strategies	September 26–27, 2010	38%	37%	--	--
Tarrance Group via National Journal	September 23–25, 2010	43%	44%	--	--
We Ask America	September 8, 2010	38%	41%	--	17%
Magellan Strategies via NRO	July 12, 2010	32%	45%	--	23%
Public Opinion Strategies via NRO	Unavailable	33%	31%	7%	30%
We Ask America	February 18, 2010	39%	32%	4%	26%

== General election results ==
Illinois's 17th district general election, November 2, 2010
Party	Candidate	Votes	%
Republican	Bobby Schilling	104,583	52.58
Democratic	Phil Hare	85,454	42.96
Green	Roger K. Davis	8,861	4.46
Total votes		198,898	100
