= Gale Schisler =

American politician (1933–2020)

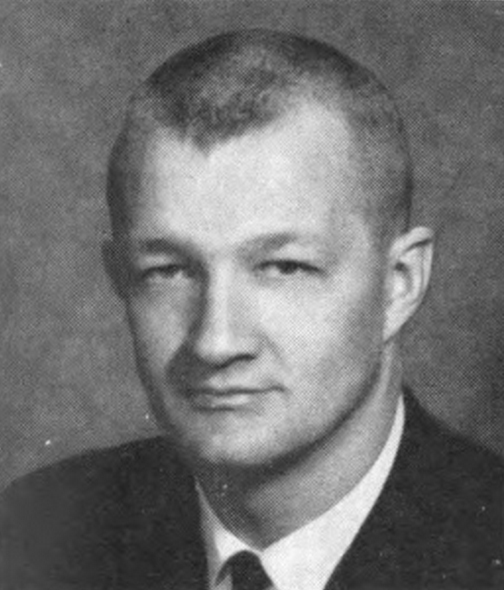

Member of the U.S. House of Representatives from Illinois's 19th district
- In office January 3, 1965 – January 3, 1967
- Preceded by: Robert T. McLoskey
- Succeeded by: Tom Railsback

Member of the Illinois House of Representatives
- In office 1969–1981
- Preceded by: George Saal
- Succeeded by: Jeff Mays
- Constituency: 46th district (1969–1971); 48th district (1971-1981)

Personal details
- Born: Darwin Gale Schisler; March 2, 1933 Knox County, Illinois, U.S.
- Died: February 2, 2020 (aged 86) Farmington, Illinois, U.S.
- Party: Democratic
- Spouse(s): Carolyn (m. 1957-1977); Gloria (m. 1980-2020)
- Children: Three
- Education: Western Illinois University; Northeast Missouri State College
- Profession: Educator

Military service
- Allegiance: United States
- Branch/service: United States Air Force
- Years of service: 1952–1955

Darwin Gale Schisler (March 2, 1933 – February 2, 2020) was an American politician who served as a member of the United States House of Representatives from Illinois's 19th congressional district and a member of the Illinois House of Representatives from the 46th district and later the 48th district.

== Early life and career ==
Darwin Gale Schisler was born March 2, 1933, on a farm in Indian Point Township, Knox County, Illinois. He attended public schools culminating in graduating from Abingdon High School in 1951. In 1952, he enlisted in the United States Air Force serving for forty five months including ten months overseas in France. After his honorable discharge, Schisler began attending Western Illinois University. While attending Western Illinois University, he was a letter winning football player and married Carolyn Cochran with whom he had three children. In 1959, he graduated with a Bachelor of Science in education and took a job teaching at London Mills Junior High School. One year later, he became the school's principal. In 1962, he earned a Master of Arts in school administration from Northeast Missouri State Teachers College.

== United States House of Representatives ==
In 1964, the Democrats in Illinois' 19th Congressional District had no candidate in the primary for U.S. representative. Friends of Schisler started a write-in campaign that successfully placed Schisler on the November ballot.

In a surprising upset, he defeated incumbent Robert T. McLoskey in the predominantly Republican district which included Fulton, Henderson, Henry, Knox, Mercer, Rock Island and Warren counties in Western Illinois.

Upon being sworn in, he was assigned to the House Science and Astronautics Committee.

While in Congress, he was a supporter of President Johnson's agenda voting in favor of his Great Society legislation including the Voting Rights Act of 1965, the creation of Medicare and Medicaid, and the Higher Education Act of 1965. He was in favor of home-rule for Washington, D.C. and signed a discharge petition to get President Johnson's preferred bill out of committee. He voted against B.F. Sisk's compromise bill that provided home rule, but only with numerous delays and stipulations. He was a supporter of repealing the "right to work" provisions in Taft Hartley.

In 1965, court order reapportionment of congressional districts moved Whiteside County into the 19th district bringing thousands of Republican voters into the already heavily Republican district. Shortly after, State Representative Tom Railsback of Moline announced his intention to stand against Schisler in the 1966 general election. Schisler was unable to overcome the partisan tilt of the new district and lost to Railsback in November. Schisler's cause was further hurt by the widespread belief that the White House was apathetic to his reelection bid.

After his loss, he was appointed as an assistant to Governor Otto Kerner Jr. leading the newly created Office of Intergovernmental Cooperation. The office was designed to coordinate state, federal and local programs and projects. He was also the staff liaison for the General Assembly's Intergovernmental Cooperation Commission. When Kerner resigned, he continued this role under Samuel H. Shapiro.

== Illinois House of Representatives ==
After briefly mulling a rematch against Railsback, Schisler chose to run for one of the three spots in the Illinois House of Representatives' 46th district which included Fulton and Tazewell counties along with the southern portion of Peoria County, Illinois. He and incumbent George Saal ran as the Democratic candidates against Republican incumbents Wilbur H. Lauterbach and J. Norman Shade. Despite hopes that a joint Schisler-Saal slate would allow Democrats to take a majority of the 46th district's seats, only Schisler was elected. He was appointed to the Education Committee and Higher Education Committee.

The decennial reapportionment process in 1971 moved him to the 48th district. The 48th included Fulton County and portions of Peoria and Tazewell counties from the 46th district. However, it also added new territory in Adams, Brown, Cass, Mason and Schuyler counties.

When the Democratic Party took a majority in the Illinois House of Representatives after the 1974 election, Schisler was appointed chair of the Agriculture Committee. He was also a member of the Illinois-Mississippi Canal and Sinnissippi Lake Commission, the Energy Resource and Recreation Council.

Five months into the Iran–United States hostage crisis, Schisler sponsored a nonbinding resolution urging Illinois’ public and private universities not to re-enroll current or new Iranian students for the upcoming school year. Later that year, he voted against the ratification of the Equal Rights Amendment and accused pro-ERA advocates of attempting to bribe him prior to the ratification vote.

He was defeated in the 1980 general election, finishing fourth of four candidates for three seats in the 48th district, by Republican candidate Jeff Mays who grabbed the third spot.

== Death ==
Schisler died on February 2, 2020, in Farmington, Illinois.

U.S. House of Representatives
Preceded by Robert T. McLoskey	Member of the U.S. House of Representatives from Illinois's 19th congressional district 1965–1967	Succeeded by Tom Railsback
