= Mike McIntyre =

American politician (born 1956)

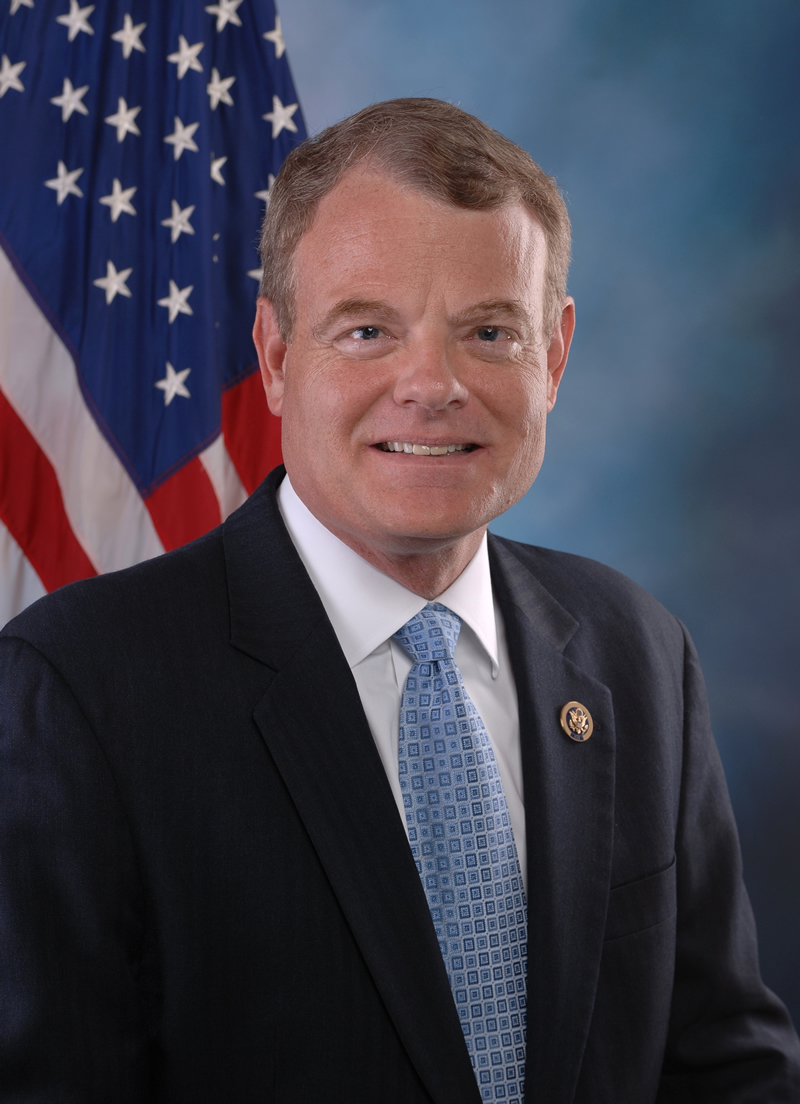

Member of the U.S. House of Representatives from North Carolina's 7th district
- In office January 3, 1997 – January 3, 2015
- Preceded by: Charlie Rose
- Succeeded by: David Rouzer

Personal details
- Born: Douglas Carmichael McIntyre II; August 6, 1956 (age 70) Lumberton, North Carolina, U.S.
- Party: Democratic
- Spouse: Dee Strickland
- Children: 2
- Education: University of North Carolina, Chapel Hill (BA, JD)

Douglas Carmichael "Mike" McIntyre II (MAC-in-tire; born August 6, 1956) is an American attorney and politician who was first elected to represent North Carolina's 7th congressional district in the U.S. House of Representatives in 1996. He served for 18 years from 1997 to 2015. McIntyre is a Democrat and, during his tenure in the House of Representatives, was a member of the Blue Dog Coalition.

== Personal life ==
Born August 6, 1956, McIntyre attended public schools in his hometown of Lumberton, North Carolina. He demonstrated an interest in leadership through public service at a young age by serving as Student Body Treasurer and later Student Body President of Lumberton High School. During this time, his interest in politics also formed through his services as a page for the North Carolina Senate in 1971 and his selection to attend Boys State in 1973, where he was elected Mayor of his city. He also participated in the Washington Workshops Congressional Seminar in the summer of 1973 and the advanced seminar in 1974. McIntyre graduated from high school in 1974.

A Morehead Scholar at the University of North Carolina, he graduated Phi Beta Kappa as a political science major in 1978 and received his Juris Doctor in 1981. During his senior year of college, the chancellor presented him the Algernon Sydney Sullivan Award for best exemplifying "unselfish interest in the welfare of his fellow man" during his collegiate career. While a law student, McIntyre served as one of North Carolina's youngest delegates at the 1980 Democratic National Convention in support of Jimmy Carter.

In 1987, McIntyre was chosen as one of the state's Five Outstanding Young North Carolinians of the Year by the North Carolina Jaycees. As a strong advocate of issues that impact the family, he was a charter member of both the North Carolina Commission on Children & Youth and the North Carolina Commission on the Family. In 1989, McIntyre earned the Governor's Award for Outstanding Volunteer Service for his longtime commitment and work with children and educators as a volunteer in the public school system. Until his election to Congress, McIntyre practiced law in his native Robeson County.

Active in community, church, civic, and professional activities, McIntyre served as a leader in the Lumberton Area Chamber of Commerce, coached three All-American Drug-Free Sports Teams, and has been active in Rotary Club, Boy Scouts, the Parent-Teacher Association, and Young Life. Additionally, he has been a lay leader in the First Presbyterian Church of Lumberton with service as an Elder, Deacon, Sunday school teacher and Chairman of the Weekday School and Day Care Committee. McIntyre married Dee Strickland in June 1982. The couple has two sons, Joshua and Stephen, who both won scholarships to the University of North Carolina at Chapel Hill and are now attorneys.

== Congressional career ==
=== Committee assignments ===
- Committee on Agriculture (Vice-Ranking Member)
  - Subcommittee on Conservation, Energy, and Forestry
  - Subcommittee on General Farm Commodities, Livestock and Horticulture
  - Subcommittee on Rural Development, Biotechnology, Specialty Crops, and Foreign Agriculture (Chairman)
  - Subcommittee on Livestock, Rural Development and Credit
  - Subcommittee on Conservation, Credit, Energy and Research
- Committee on Armed Services
  - Subcommittee on Seapower and Projection Forces (Ranking Member)
  - Subcommittee on Tactical Air and Land Forces
  - Subcommittee on Terrorism, Unconventional Threats and Capabilities
  - Special Oversight Panel on Terrorism (Vice-Chair)
- Commission on Security and Cooperation in Europe

=== Congressional caucuses ===
At one time, McIntyre was said to have been a member of the most congressional caucuses in the House of Representatives. Additionally, he was founder and/or co-chairman of the following caucuses:

- Adopt a Country Caucus (Co-Chairman and Co-Founder)
- Air Force Caucus (Co-Chairman)
- Congressional Boating Caucus (Co-Chairman)
- Congressional Caucus on Youth Sports (Chairman and Founder)
- Congressional Prayer Caucus (Co-Chairman)
- Congressional United Kingdom Caucus (Co-Chairman)
- Congressional Waterways Caucus (Co-Chairman and Co-Founder)
- Friends of Scotland Caucus (Co-Chairman and Co-Founder)
- National Task Force on Fatherhood (Co-Chairman)
- Rural Caucus (Co-Chairman)
- Rural Healthcare Coalition (Co-Chairman)
- Special Operations Forces Caucus (Co-Chairman and Co-Founder)
- Congressional Constitution Caucus

=== Agriculture and economic development ===
Largely composed of rural communities and farm families, support and representation for farmers and rural economic development is imperative for many constituents in the 7th district. When elected to Congress in 1996, McIntyre obtained a seat on the U.S. House Committee on Agriculture and by retirement was the second highest-ranking member. In 2009, McIntyre was elected Chairman of the Subcommittee on Rural Development, Biotechnology, Specialty Crops, and Foreign Agriculture. Through the years, he also served on the following subcommittees: General Commodities, Livestock and Horticulture; Conservation, Energy and Forestry; Livestock, Rural Development and Credit; Conservation, Credit, Energy and Research. McIntyre additionally served as Chairman of the Rural Caucus Task Force on Jobs, Economic Development and Transportation and later became Co-Chairman of the entire Rural Caucus.

Notably, McIntyre co-authored and co-sponsored legislation with Rep. Bill Jenkins (TN) titled, The Fair and Equitable Tobacco Reform Act, otherwise known as the "tobacco buyout." This legislation was the result of many years of work in an effort to relieve suffering tobacco farmers and after a long debate, this landmark legislation was signed into law as part of the American Jobs Creation Act in 2004. The tobacco buyout eliminated the quota and price support system that was in place and provided $10.1 billion in payments made over ten years to tobacco quota owners and growers for the elimination of their government created quotas. These payments, known as the Tobacco Transition Payment Program, allowed farmers to reduce debt and diversify or expand operations in tobacco and other farm enterprises such as vineyards. The last payment was made in January 2014.

Business and economic development was always at the forefront of McIntyre's agenda and his work has focused on promoting jobs, workforce development and business opportunities. As Chairman of the House Subcommittee on Rural Development, McIntyre supported the Microenterprise Business and Rural Entrepreneur Program to help businesses which employ less than 10 people. He worked closely with USDA Rural Development throughout his years in Congress to bring funding for town halls, public works facilities, day care centers, fire and rescue stations, police departments, courthouses, small businesses, housing assistance, health care facilities, hospitals and other public needs to southeastern North Carolina.

McIntyre also worked on legislation to establish the Southeast Crescent Regional Commission which was signed into law as part of the 2008 Farm Bill. The purpose of the commission is to alleviate poverty and promote economic growth in the most distressed areas of the southeastern United States. The commission awards grants to areas in need to fund projects that meet the criteria for community betterment, including infrastructure, education and training, entrepreneurship, and leadership development.

McIntyre was well known for his coordination of the annual North Carolina Business and Economic Summit in Washington, initially called "The Washington Perspective" and later called "Taking Care of Business", which attracted approximately 250 business, Chamber of Commerce and civic leaders annually in September. These events were co-hosted by two other congressmen originally and currently has almost the entire congressional delegation continuing this popular tradition.

McIntyre has received significant recognition for his work in the agriculture and economic development arenas. He was named as the first recipient ever of an international award in public policy by the International Association of Personnel in Employment Security for his efforts to produce job opportunities and increase worker training. The National Association of Development Organizations honored him for his leadership in regional economic development, and the Southern Economic Development Council has chosen him five times for its Legislative Honor Roll. In 2002, he won the North Carolina Employment Security Advancing Workforce Development Award. McIntyre's service to agriculture has been recognized by numerous agricultural organizations including the American Farm Bureau Federation, the National Farmers Union, and the AgFirst Farm Credit Bank. In 2007, he was named National Legislator of the Year by the National Farm Service Agency Employees Association. He had received the Distinguished Service to Agriculture Award from the Robeson County Crop Promotion Association in 1998 and subsequently received the North Carolina Distinguished Service to Agriculture Award from the N.C. Farm Bureau in 2014.

=== Coastal communities ===
As the U.S. representative of many coastal communities, McIntyre was instrumental in securing over half a billion dollars in funding to ensure the beaches, waterways, inlets and ports of North Carolina's 7th district were adequately maintained. He was founder and co-chairman of the Congressional Waterways Caucus, was co-chairman of the Congressional Boating Caucus, and was a member of the House Coastal Caucus and House Oceans Caucus. For his work on beach and waterway issues, McIntyre was named Coastal Advocate of the Year by the American Shore and Beach Preservation Association; received the Admiral's Circle Award from the National Marine Manufacturers Association; received the Conservationist Award from the NC Coastal Land Trust; received the J.W. Pate Award from the Cape Fear River Assembly; and was named Beach Preservationist of the Year by the Oak Island Beach Preservation Society.

=== Constituent services ===
Constituent service was a top priority for McIntyre. Through both the Washington and district offices, McIntyre and his staff worked to help veterans obtain medals earned during their service, assist senior citizens with their social security or Medicare benefits, aid citizens in obtaining a passport for travel, or personally welcome constituents to the nation's capital.

McIntyre placed a sign in the entry area of his office that stated: "This Office Belongs to the People of the Seventh Congressional District."

=== Healthcare ===
McIntyre voted against both the initial House version of the Affordable Care Act (ACA) and the final Senate-approved version. After Republicans took control of the House of Representatives following the 2010 midterm elections, McIntyre was one of three Democrats who voted to repeal the ACA in 2011. He did so again in 2013, standing as one of only two Democrats to vote for the law's repeal.

During his time in office, McIntyre was a member and former co-chairman of the House Rural Health Care Coalition which advocates for advancing rural priorities in health care. Additionally, he was a member of several Congressional caucuses that worked to prevent disease and secure research funding including the Congressional Community Pharmacy Caucus, Congressional Diabetes Caucus, the House Cancer Caucus, the House Vision Caucus, and the Youth Sports Caucus.

For his work on rural health care initiatives, McIntyre has been named a "Super Hero" six times by the National Association of Community Health Centers. He was also presented with the National Rural Health Association's Legislative award in 2000 (as one of five Representatives) and in 2003 (as the only Representative) for demonstrating great dedication to the health of rural Americans.

=== Immigration ===
Throughout his tenure, McIntyre consistently held a conservative anti-immigration stance that often aligned more with Republicans than with his own Democratic Party. Leading up to the 2012 general election, McIntyre was endorsed by the Americans for Legal Immigration PAC (ALIPAC), a political action committee frequently promoted by white supremacists and anti-Semites. ALIPAC chose to endorse McIntyre over his Republican opponent, noting that McIntyre "co-sponsored legislation to reject all forms of amnesty for illegal immigrants, opposes President Barack Obama's 'deferred action' amnesty, attends anti-illegal immigration events and has made border security a top campaign issue." In response to the endorsement, McIntyre sent out a press release approving it.

=== Military and veterans' affairs ===
Working on legislation to support the nation's armed forces was of particular importance to McIntyre, who represented a district that initially was home to four major military bases, Camp Lejeune, New River Air Station, Fort Bragg, and Pope Air Force Base, as well as Military Ocean Terminal Sunny Point, three Coast Guard stations and several National Guard armories. McIntyre served on the House Armed Services Committee for the duration of his time in office and was the third highest-ranking member by retirement. He was Vice-Chairman of the Special Oversight Panel on Terrorism, the top Ranking Member of the Subcommittee on Seapower and Projection Forces, and a member of the Subcommittee on Tactical Air and Land Forces.

McIntyre was co-Founder and co-Chairman of the Special Operations Forces Caucus, which was started in an effort to recognize the role that Special Operations Forces and the U.S. Special Operations Command have in national security missions. For his work, McIntyre has been recognized by the Air Force Association, American Legion, Association of the U.S. Army, Disabled American Veterans, Navy League, Special Forces Charitable Trust, and the VFW. He received the Charles Dick Medal of Merit Award from the North Carolina National Guard in the year 2000 for his strong support of the National Guard and national defense. He has also been inducted as an Honorary Member of the Fleet Reserve Command, made an Honorary Life Member of the N.C. Chapter of the Military Officers Association of America, and presented the Distinguished Public Service Award from the U.S. Secretary of the Navy, its highest civilian honor.

During his tenure in Congress, McIntyre helped secure funds for several new Veterans Affairs clinics, including a dialysis center in Fayetteville, N.C. He successfully advocated for the establishment of two additional veterans' health clinics in Robeson and Brunswick counties, as well as the building of a new veterans regional health center in Wilmington. McIntyre was awarded National Legislator of the Year in 2008 and the All-American Hero Award in 2009 and 2013 for work advocating on behalf of veterans, including support of an annual Military Construction and VA Appropriations bill that adequately meets the needs of veterans. He supported the authorization for the construction nationally of five new polytrauma centers and three Centers of Excellence in Mental Health, and was also an original co-sponsor of the Joshua Omvig Veterans Suicide Prevention Act, which was passed by the U.S. House and provides outreach, education, and training to VA staff to ensure that veterans are receiving adequate mental health care.

=== NASA ===
McIntyre has been a supporter of NASA and the space program, stating the following: "Not only does space exploration inspire and excite, but it also has numerous practical benefits to people everywhere: from GPS to pacemakers; from microwave ovens to highly advanced computing systems; from water purification to search and rescue missions; from cancer therapy to robotics; from lightweight, durable metals to power generation of energy and telecommunications; from solar cells and batteries to recycling and waste management. Technological improvements affecting weather predictions, storm monitoring, agricultural production and global transportation have greatly affected our lives and helped our environment on earth. Fascination with the vastness of God's creation and the make-up of the universe is a never-ending discovery that always inspires us and advances our ingenuity and imagination and increases greatly our education in so many fields of learning and human endeavor. Indeed, there are no limits to space exploration and the discoveries made by the human spirit."

=== Senior citizens ===
McIntyre was recognized with a pair of boxing gloves from the National Committee to Preserve Social Security and Medicare because of his advocacy work on behalf of senior citizens. He also received the M.V.P. Award for the entire Congress from the TREA Senior Citizens League in 2004 and later received the Seniors Advocate Award for his legislative leadership on behalf of seniors in 2012.

=== Youth sports ===
Advocacy for youth sports was a priority during McIntyre's congressional career. He coached youth sports in Robeson County for several years in T-ball, baseball, football, and basketball, including three All-American Drug-Free teams. McIntyre was the first volunteer coach in the county to be certified by the National Youth Sports Coaches Association and the first to qualify his teams for the All-American Drug-Free Team based on character development and drug education and awareness. He was a charter member of, and helped to incorporate, the Lumberton Youth Baseball Association, which has subsequently spawned several championship teams on the regional, state, and national levels.

Congressman McIntyre is the Founder and Chairman of the Congressional Caucus on Youth Sports. Through cooperative efforts with the Citizenship through Sports Alliance, McIntyre and former NBA star Clark Kellogg, now a CBS Sports analyst and commentator, presented a National Report Card on the State of Youth Sports in 2005 at the National Press Club in Washington. Their goal was to draw attention to the need for greater respect, cooperation, discipline, and commitment to youth sports. Having introduced a Youth Sports Legislative Agenda, McIntyre has also hosted three regional youth sports conferences and has worked with the NFL, NBA, NHL, PGA, NCAA, U.S. Soccer, U.S. Tennis and the U.S. Olympic Committee in promoting youth sports, fitness, and recreation nationally.

Congressman McIntyre has received several honors and recognitions in the area of youth sports. He was honored with the National Congressional Award in 2006 by the National Recreation and Park Association for his leadership in promoting youth sports and recreational programs. He was also recognized by the Positive Coaching Alliance for his promotion of teamwork, commitment, persistence, empathy, and leadership among young athletes. In 2008, he was named an International Sports Ethics Fellow by the Institute for International Sport in recognition of his leadership through positive example. His selection placed him among a unique group of sports celebrities such as Grant Hill, David Robinson, Mia Hamm, and Jeff Gordon.

Congressman McIntyre also played sports throughout his years in Congress. He played second base on the Congressional Baseball Team for a number of years, participated in Congressional Basketball and Football Games, as well as tennis, soccer and golf matches. These charitable events benefitted organizations such as the Boys and Girls Clubs, the Literary Council, and efforts to fight breast cancer, prostate cancer, and homelessness. In 2012, he earned his black belt in Taekwondo from Grand Master Jhoon Rhee, an instructor of boxing champion Muhammad Ali and martial arts star Bruce Lee. Additionally, he earned the Presidential Champion Gold Award given under a tiered system designed to encourage physical activity and sponsored by the President's Council on Physical Fitness and Sports.

=== Notable achievements ===
==== Black history celebrations and recognitions ====
Congressman McIntyre had a strong relationship with the African-American community, and he was one of only two congressmen known to both host and sponsor his own event in recognition of Black History Month. Each year he would honor African-American elected officials from all levels of government throughout his district, and he would invite a colleague from the Congressional Black Caucus as his special guest of honor to come to southeastern North Carolina for the celebration, which regularly drew hundreds of attendees over the years. McIntyre also obtained appropriations for expansion of the African-American cultural center in Robeson County, where many of the celebrations were held. He was honored for his work by several African-American churches and communities through the years.

==== Lumbee recognition bills ====
McIntyre was a well-known champion of the fight for federal recognition of the Lumbee Tribe, which has its tribal headquarters in his home county of Robeson and is the largest tribe east of the Mississippi River. Twice McIntyre successfully shepherded federal recognition bills through Congress, putting together a coalition of Democrats, Republicans, liberals, moderates and conservatives, after he personally lobbied his colleagues one-by-one. McIntyre argued that recognition for them was a matter of dignity and respect and would help the tribe with funding for education, health care and economic development. The House passed the bill he introduced in 2007 by a veto-proof margin (despite the Bush administration's opposition) of two-thirds of the House. The bill passed again in 2009 and was supported by the Obama administration. Both times, however, the Senate failed to bring the measure in that chamber to the floor for a vote.

==== Prayer caucus leadership ====
McIntyre was Co-Chairman of the Congressional Prayer Breakfast, which had over 100 members. The caucus met regularly on the first night of each week that Congress was in session—just across the hall from the House chamber to pray for wisdom for decisions to be made that week and to pray for constituents' needs in their communities back home.

McIntyre also had the opportunity to serve as Co-Chairman of the Congressional Prayer Breakfast, which is for current and former Members of Congress. In this capacity, McIntyre has also spoken briefly at the National Prayer Breakfast, which has occurred every year with every President since Eisenhower. Nearly 3000 lay leaders, clergy, business leaders and other citizens join various world leaders, the Joint Chiefs of Staff from the Pentagon, senators, members of Congress and other persons from the three branches of government, gathered in Washington for this event on the first Thursday in February.

At the National Day of Prayer Ceremony on Capitol Hill, which occurs on the first Thursday in May in conjunction with the national celebration, McIntyre was invited twice to speak on behalf of the Legislative Branch of Government.

In 2006, the Center for Christian Statesmanship selected him as the Distinguished Christian Statesman of the Year for "his character, leadership, integrity and faithfulness in public service."

==== Scottish-American relations ====
North Carolina's 7th district includes the largest number of Scottish-American descendants in the United States. McIntyre co-founded and co-chaired the Friends of Scotland caucus and was the original sponsor of the unanimously passed H.Res. 41 "Expressing the sense of the House of Representatives that a day should be established as 'National Tartan Day' to recognize the outstanding achievements and contributions made by Scottish-Americans to the United States."

In 2008, McIntyre came to the rescue for Scottish literature and poetry when it was discovered that the Library of Congress had made changes to its classification system, removing 40 headings and subheadings for Scottish writing and moving the body of work under the "English" classification heading. This move garnered concerns and protests from academics, writers, government ministers and many others. First Minister Alex Salmond discussed the matter with McIntyre while he was en route to Scotland on Armed Services business. The Washington Post noted that Linda Fabiani, the Minister of Culture in Edinburgh also lobbied McIntyre while he was visiting the country to see what he could do. Within the scope of a few phone calls, the changes were reversed by the Library of Congress and the Librarian of Congress, James H. Billington, issued a letter to the National Library of Scotland.

As a token of gratitude for McIntyre's leadership during his Congressional career, the Scottish Parliament passed a motion (S4M-10778) on December 8, 2014, at the First Minister's request, recognizing McIntyre's contributions to Scotland's relationship with the United States and congratulating him on his retirement from Congress.

==== Youth initiatives and volunteering in schools ====
McIntyre organized and hosted the Seventh Congressional District Annual Youth Leadership Summit and invited all public and private schools in his district to send an outstanding junior to a one-day seminar to discuss issues that affected their communities and also to propose ways in which to resolve them, encouraging the students to have a direct impact on their local communities.

In addition, McIntyre was well known for his school volunteer work, which started when he first began his law career in 1981 when he organized the Robeson County Bar Association's Citizenship Education Committee. He continued throughout his congressional career to volunteer in the schools and has done so for over 35 years. From the Washington Workshops Foundation to the John C. Stennis Program for Congressional Interns on Capitol Hill, from elementary schools to graduate & professional schools, from hosting students in his office, to being invited as a freshman his first year in office to the Presidents' Summit for America's Future because of his long history of involvement in helping young people, McIntyre's work with youth and his inspirational speeches to school assemblies, in the classrooms and at events on Capitol Hill have reached thousands of students for more than three decades. He was recognized for his work with educators and youth prior to serving in Congress in 1989 with the Governor's Award for Outstanding Volunteer Service and during his congressional career with the North Carolina Parent – Teachers' Association (PTA) bestowing upon him an honorary life membership.

== Electoral history ==
2012 U.S. House election in North Carolina: district 7
Party	Candidate	Votes	%	±%
Democratic	Mike McIntyre (incumbent)	168,695	50.10	−3.58
Republican	David Rouzer	168,041	49.90	+3.58

2010 U.S. House election in North Carolina: district 7
Party	Candidate	Votes	%	±%
Democratic	Mike McIntyre (incumbent)	113,957	53.68	−15.16
Republican	Ilario Gregory Pantano	98,328	46.32	+15.16

2008 U.S. House election in North Carolina: district 7
Party	Candidate	Votes	%	±%
Democratic	Mike McIntyre (incumbent)	215,383	68.84	−3.96
Republican	Will Breazeale	97,472	31.16	+3.96

2006 U.S. House election in North Carolina: district 7
Party	Candidate	Votes	%	±%
Democratic	Mike McIntyre (incumbent)	101,787	72.8	−0.39
Republican	Shirley Davis	38,033	27.2	+0.39

2004 U.S. House election in North Carolina: district 7
Party	Candidate	Votes	%	±%
Democratic	Mike McIntyre (incumbent)	180,382	73.19	+2.26
Republican	Ken Plonk	66,084	26.81	−0.51

2002 U.S. House election in North Carolina: district 7
Party	Candidate	Votes	%	±%
Democratic	Mike McIntyre (incumbent)	118,543	71.13	+1.38
Republican	James R. Adams	45,537	27.32	−2.62
Libertarian	David Michael Brooks	2,574	1.54	+0.23

2000 U.S. House election in North Carolina: district 7
Party	Candidate	Votes	%	±%
Democratic	Mike McIntyre (incumbent)	160,185	69.75	−21.5
Republican	James R. Adams	66,463	28.94	+28.94
Libertarian	Bob Burns	3,018	1.31	−7.44

1998 U.S. House election in North Carolina: district 7
Party	Candidate	Votes	%	±%
Democratic	Mike McIntyre (incumbent)	124,366	91.25	+38.37
Libertarian	Paul Meadows	11,924	8.75	+7.8

1996 U.S. House election in North Carolina: district 7
Party	Candidate	Votes	%	±%
Democratic	Mike McIntyre	87,487	52.88	
Republican	Bill Caster	75,811	45.82	
Libertarian	Chris Nubel	1,573	0.95	
Natural Law	Garrison King Frantz	569	0.34	

== Post-congressional activity ==
Upon his retirement from Congress, McIntyre joined Poyner Spruill law firm in Raleigh, North Carolina, as Senior Advisor and Director of Government Relations, concentrating on business and economic development, as well as working with a variety of clients on various government relations matters on the federal, state, regional, and local levels.

In 2017, McIntyre worked with the North Carolina Bar Association to develop the Youth Leadership Challenge program which provides opportunities for civic engagement and community leadership to high school students. An earmarked contribution from McIntyre's congressional campaign fund for the North Carolina Bar Foundation Endowment made this initiative possible.

Additionally, McIntyre assisted in establishing a new mentoring program through the UNC Christian Legal Society called, The McIntyre-Whichard Legal Fellows Program. Named in honor of McIntyre and former North Carolina Supreme Court Justice Willis Whichard, the program pairs UNC law students with legal professionals in the community for a year-long mentorship which focuses on professional and spiritual growth. The inaugural class of McIntyre-Whichard Legal Fellows commenced during the 2016–17 academic year.

In June 2018, McIntyre was the recipient of The Chief Justice I. Beverly Lake Jr. Public Service Award given by the North Carolina Bar Association, honoring his commitment to public service throughout his life. The award recognizes an outstanding lawyer in North Carolina who has performed exemplary public service and is "reserved for those persons, families or organizations whose contributions are significant, whose conduct is consonant with the NCBA's and NCBF's stated mission and who are highly regarded by the legal community and the public."

For McIntyre's accomplishments and contributions to enhance UNC's School of Law and the profession more broadly, the UNC Law Alumni Association presented him with the Distinguished Alumni Award in 2019. The award "recognizes members of the UNC School of Law community who embody the law school’s mission to serve the legal profession, the people and institutions of North Carolina, the nation and the world with ethics and dedication to the cause of justice."

During the spring semester of 2019, McIntyre served as a Fellow with the UNC Institute of Politics (IOP). The program allows fellows to independently lead a series of non-credit seminars on relevant issues of national importance. The seminars are open to all UNC students. McIntyre's syllabus included topics such as leadership, civic engagement in the community, and public service through political involvement with an emphasis on recognizing the importance of the community in which one serves.

McIntyre was also named an honoree for North Carolina Lawyers Weekly's 2019 "Leaders In Law" award and named "Lawyer of the Year" during the award ceremony held on October 25. The Leaders in Law program recognizes practicing legal professionals in the state of North Carolina who go above and beyond in their profession and community. Honorees are selected by a panel of independent legal professionals based on professional and personal accomplishment as well as community involvement. The Lawyer of the Year is presented to the honoree with the highest overall score from the judges.

In 2020, McIntyre was selected to receive the Liberty Bell Award by the Young Lawyers Division of the North Carolina Bar Association for his "commitment to strengthening democracy and promoting civic engagement." The award is given annually as part of Law Day to an "individual who has strengthened the American system of freedom under the law." The North Carolina Bar Association celebrates Law Day on the first Friday in May, however events in 2020 were cancelled or postponed due to the COVID-19 crisis. Previous recipients of the Liberty Bell Award include twelve judges, five chief justices, a U.S. senator and two governors.

On September 21, 2020, it was announced that McIntyre would join the Ward and Smith law firm as Senior Advisor for Government Relations and Economic Development. He is based in the firm's Raleigh office and works on behalf of clients across North Carolina and in Washington, D.C.

The North Carolina State Bar Council awarded McIntyre the John B. McMillan Distinguished Service Award in January 2021 in recognition for his efforts to enhance and strengthen legal education, to further the public's understanding of and confidence in the rule of law and the justice system, and to encourage professionalism among Bar members. McIntyre was additionally commended for his significant contributions to assuring equal access to the judicial system and improving the quality of services rendered by the law profession.

In 2021, the UNC Chapter of Pi Sigma Alpha (the national political science honor society) invited McIntyre to become an Honorary Member in recognition of his support of and engagement with the UNC Department of Political Science. In addition to being an alumnus of the department and a graduate of the UNC School of Law, McIntyre has become increasingly involved in the education of undergraduate and graduate students at the university through semester long seminars and the establishment of a mentorship program as noted above. For this service to the university, his work while serving in Congress, and his dedication to improving the state of North Carolina, McIntyre was also one of that year's inductees into UNC's Order of the Golden Fleece, its oldest and highest honorary society.

In 2023, McIntyre was awarded an honorary Doctor of Laws degree by his alma mater, University of North Carolina at Chapel Hill. The announcement of this recognition included praise for his community and public service, as well as the positive impact his work had, both internationally and in North Carolina.

McIntyre was recently selected as the 2024 awardee of the H. Brent McKnight Renaissance Lawyer Award by the North Carolina Bar Association at its Annual Meeting in Charlotte. The award recognizes practicing North Carolina attorneys who demonstrate the "Renaissance Lawyer" qualities embodied by Judge McKnight including "trustworthiness, respectful and courteous treatment of all people, enthusiasm for intellectual achievement and commitment to excellence in work, and service to the profession and community during a multi-faceted, accomplished life." The breadth of McIntyre's contributions through community, church, civic, and professional service were emphasized in remarks made by Gill Beck, Chair of the NCBA Professionalism Committee, who presented the award.

During the 2024 Annual Fall Conference of the North Carolina Beach, Inlet, and Waterway Association, McIntyre was presented with the organization's Hero of the Coast Award. This award "recognizes individuals or organizations who exemplify determination, leadership, and passion in advancing the mission of protecting North Carolina's coastline." As one of only three recipients ever of this award, McIntyre was recognized for his dedication to ensuring long-term coastal preservation in North Carolina communities throughout his congressional and post-congressional career.

U.S. House of Representatives
Preceded by Charlie Rose	Member of the U.S. House of Representatives from North Carolina's 7th congressional district 1997–2015	Succeeded by David Rouzer
U.S. order of precedence (ceremonial)
Preceded by Sue Myrick as Former U.S. Representative	Order of precedence of the United States as Former U.S. Representative	Succeeded by G. K. Butterfield as Former U.S. Representative
