= Robert T. McLoskey =

American politician

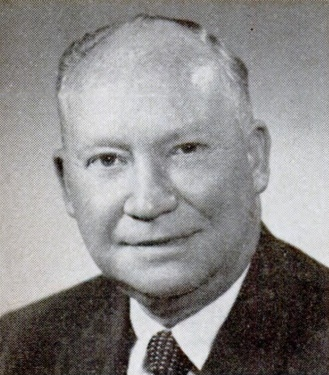

Member of the U.S. House of Representatives from Illinois's 19th district
- In office January 3, 1963 – January 3, 1965
- Preceded by: Robert B. Chiperfield
- Succeeded by: Gale Schisler

Member of the Illinois House of Representatives
- In office 1951-1962

Personal details
- Born: Robert Thaddeus McLoskey; June 26, 1907 Monmouth, Illinois
- Died: November 2, 1990 (aged 83) Monmouth, Illinois
- Party: Republican

Robert Thaddeus McLoskey (June 26, 1907 – November 2, 1990) was a U.S. representative from Illinois.

Born in Monmouth, Illinois, McLoskey graduated from Monmouth High School in Monmouth, Illinois in 1924. He earned a B.A. from Monmouth College, Monmouth, Illinois in 1928 and a certificate in mortuary science from Worsham College in Chicago, Illinois in 1932. He served as a funeral director and later as tax supervisor for Warren County, Illinois from 1935 to 1939 then as a field supervisor for the Illinois Department of Public Health's Bureau of Vital Statistics from 1940 to 1950.

He was a member of the Illinois House of Representatives from 1951 to 1962. He also worked as a farm operator and manager.

McLoskey was elected as a Republican in Illinois's 19th District to the Eighty-eighth Congress (January 3, 1963 – January 3, 1965).

He was an unsuccessful candidate for reelection to the Eighty-ninth Congress in 1964. He served as chairman of the Warren County, Illinois, planning commission from 1969 to 1972.

He died on November 2, 1990, in Monmouth, Illinois. His remains were cremated.

U.S. House of Representatives
Preceded by Robert B. Chiperfield	Member of the U.S. House of Representatives from Illinois's 19th congressional district 1963–1965	Succeeded by Gale Schisler
