= Richard P. Myers =

American politician (1947–2010)

Member of the Illinois House of Representatives from the 94th district
- In office January 1995 – December 2010
- Preceded by: Bill Edley
- Succeeded by: Norine Hammond

Personal details
- Born: December 27, 1947 McDonough County, Illinois, U.S.
- Died: December 1, 2010 (aged 62) Colchester, Illinois, U.S.
- Party: Republican
- Spouse: Christine

Richard P. "Rich" Myers (December 27, 1947 – December 1, 2010) was a Republican member of the Illinois House of Representatives, having represented the 94th district from 1995 until his death in 2010. Representative Myers was a conservative Republican, who valued the importance of fiscal responsibility.

== Early life and career ==
He graduated from Colchester High School in 1966 and received a bachelor's degree from Western Illinois University in Macomb in 1973. He spent six years in the U.S. Army Reserves.

== Legislative career ==
In the 1994 general election, Myers defeated Democratic incumbent Bill Edley to represent the 95th district.

During his last term, Myers was minority spokesman on the House Appropriations-Higher Education Committee and also served on the Agriculture and Conservation, State Government Administration, and Elections and Campaign Reform committees. Representative Myers had expected to survive in acceptable health long enough to serve another term despite his struggle with ill health, but he died December 1, 2010, after a long battle with prostate cancer. He was lauded on his death for his contributions to the district, to its schools, and to Western Illinois University. The Republican Representative Committee of the 94th Representative District appointed Norine Hammond, the Emmett Township Supervisor and a longtime aide to Myers, to fill the vacancy created by his death until the next regularly scheduled election.

== Other political involvement ==
During the 2008 Republican Party presidential primaries, Myers worked on behalf of the presidential campaign of former U.S. Senator Fred Thompson serving as a congressional district chair for Illinois's 17th congressional district.
