= Walnut Grove, McDonough County, Illinois =

Walnut Grove, Illinois
- Unincorporated community
- Location within Illinois Location within the United States
- Coordinates: 40°36′58″N 90°33′33″W
- Country: United States
- State: Illinois
- County: McDonough
- Elevation: 709 ft (216 m)
- Time zone: UTC-6 (Central (CST))
  - Summer (DST): UTC-5 (CDT)
- Area code: 309
- GNIS feature ID: 423283

Walnut Grove is an unincorporated community in McDonough County, Illinois, United States. Walnut Grove Township was first settled in 1830. The town of Walnut Grove was laid out in 1870. It was originally created on a railroad line that passed through the area that no longer exists.

== Notable person ==
- Kenneth G. McMillan, Illinois State Senator and educator, grew up near Walnut Grove, on a farm.
