= Norine Hammond =

American politician

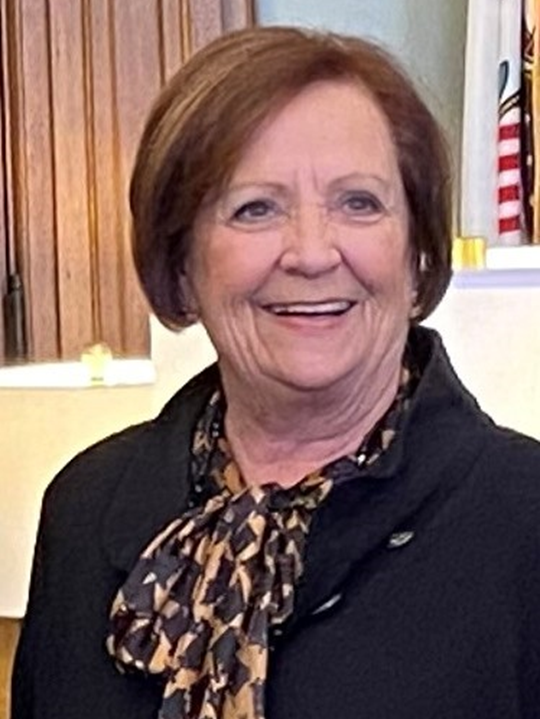
- Hammond in 2023

Member of the Illinois House of Representatives
- Incumbent
- Assumed office December 14, 2010
- Preceded by: Richard P. Myers
- Constituency: 94th district (2023-present); 93rd district (2013-2023); 94th district (2010-2013)

Personal details
- Party: Republican
- Spouse: Leonard Hammond
- Children: 1
- Education: Western Illinois University
- Profession: Politician

Norine K. Hammond is a Republican member of the Illinois House of Representatives. She has served since her appointment in December 2010 to replace the late Rich Myers. Hammond represents the 94th district, located in western Illinois, which contains all or parts of Fulton, Hancock, Henderson, McDonough, Mercer, and Warren counties.

== Early life and career ==
In 1999, she became a legislative aide to Richard P. Myers and would serve in that capacity until his death. She was a trustee for Emmet Township from 2004 to 2006 and was township supervisor from 2006 until her appointment to the Illinois House. She also served for a time on the Macomb Planning Commission.

== Illinois House of Representatives ==
On December 1, 2010, Republican incumbent Rich Myers died from prostate cancer creating a vacancy in the Illinois House. The Republican Representative Committee of the 94th Representative District appointed Hammond to the subsequent vacancy for the remainder of the 96th General Assembly. Hammond was sworn into office on December 14, 2010. In her first term, she was assigned to the following House committees: Aging; Agriculture & Conservation; Appropriations—Higher Education; Consumer Protection; Higher Education; and Human Services.

In the 2011 decennial reapportionment, Hammond was drawn into the 93rd district which included all or parts of Galesburg, Macomb, Mount Sterling, Rushville, Havana and Abingdon. In the 2022 Illinois House of Representatives election, Hammond was elected in the 94th district. Due to redistricting, the 93rd district was won by Travis Weaver.

In 2026, Josh Higgins, a school board member from Henderson County and endorsee of the Illinois House Freedom Caucus, defeated Hammond in the Republican primary.

=== Committee assignments ===
As of December 8, 2025, Representative Hammond is a member of the following Illinois House committees:

- Consumer Protection Committee (HCON)
- Cybersecurity, Data Analytics, & IT Committee (HDCA)
- Executive Committee (HEXC)
- Gun Violence Prevention Committee (HGVP)
- Human Services Committee (HHSV) (Republican Spokesperson)
  - Budget Impact Subcommittee (HCON-HBUD)
- Public Utilities Committee (HPUB)
  - Natural Gas Subcommittee (HPUB-HNAT)
- Rules Committee (HRUL) (Republican Spokesperson)
