= Lane Evans =

American politician (1951–2014)

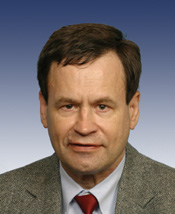

Member of the U.S. House of Representatives from Illinois's 17th district
- In office January 3, 1983 – January 3, 2007
- Preceded by: George M. O'Brien
- Succeeded by: Phil Hare

Personal details
- Born: Lane Allen Evans; August 4, 1951 Rock Island, Illinois, U.S.
- Died: November 5, 2014 (aged 63) East Moline, Illinois, U.S.
- Party: Democratic
- Education: Augustana College, Georgetown University
- Occupation: Attorney
- Lane Evans's voice Evans speaks on authorizing veterans' benefits to WW2 merchant mariners Recorded September 9, 1992

Lane Allen Evans (August 4, 1951 – November 5, 2014) was an American attorney and politician who served as a Democratic member of the United States House of Representatives from 1983 until 2007, representing the 17th district of Illinois. Evans announced that he would not seek reelection in November 2006 and retired at the end of the 109th Congress, due to the increasingly debilitating effects of Parkinson's disease.

== Background ==
Evans was born in 1951 in Rock Island, Illinois, and attended Alleman High School and Augustana College there. He served in the United States Marine Corps during the Vietnam War, stationed in Okinawa. After leaving the Marines in 1971, Evans enrolled at Augustana College in Rock Island, graduating in 1974. He earned a Juris Doctor degree from Georgetown University in 1977 and he started his legal career as an attorney with the Quad Cities Legal Clinic [Mid America Law Offices, Ltd.] in Moline.

In 1982, Evans ran for and won the Democratic nomination for Illinois's 17th congressional district, which included most of Illinois' share of the Quad Cities area. It had been renumbered from the 19th District since Illinois lost two districts after the 1980 census. The district had been in Republican hands for all but two years since 1939. However, the brand of Republicanism that prevailed in the district had traditionally been a moderate one. Evans got a significant boost when 16-year incumbent Tom Railsback was defeated for renomination by a more conservative Republican, State Senator Kenneth McMillan. Taking advantage of hardships from that year's recession, Evans won by around 5 percentage points. Evans earned the highest opposition (90%) to President Reagan's agenda of any congress member during his first congressional session and then handily defeated McMillan in a 1984 rematch. Despite Ronald Reagan's landslide victory that year, Evans pulled in 57% to Reagan's 54% -besting the president by more than 5,000 votes in the 17th Congressional District. This was one of the few congressional districts where Reagan's percentage in the two-way was lower than the three-way in 1980.

Evans faced opposition in his next four campaigns and beat his 1990 Republican opponent, Dan Lee, by more than 50,000 votes with 67% of the vote. In 1994, Republicans retook the House, yet Evans held his seat and won by 9 points over a little-known Republican, Jim Anderson, who spent almost no money. This emboldened the Republicans for 1996, when Evans faced Mark Baker, an anchor at WGEM-TV in Quincy (the third-largest city in the district). Presidential candidate Bill Clinton carried the district by a healthy 30,000 votes, and Evans defeated Baker by 11,000 votes. A 1998 rematch was closer, with Evans only winning by 6,000 votes. A third run by Baker in 2000 saw Evans win by 10 points. Redistricting after the 2000 census made Evans safer. Decatur and part of Springfield were added while some more rural areas were taken out. The redistricting process, guided by House Speaker and 14th District Congressman Dennis Hastert and 3rd District Congressman Bill Lipinski, solidified the holdings of many Illinois incumbents. Evans was re-elected in 2002 and 2004.

Evans is credited with passage of the Agent Orange Act of 1991 which he sponsored. In 1995 he was awarded the Silver Helmet award from American Veterans Group (AMVETS). Evans was also instrumental in the election of Barack Obama during the 2004 United States Senate election in Illinois.

Beginning in 1995, Evans battled Parkinson's disease. While his previous opponents did not make an issue of it, his 2004 opponent, Andrea Zinga (a former anchorwoman at KWQC-TV and WQAD-TV in the Quad Cities) claimed he was not able to fully represent the people of his district due to his health concerns. However, this tactic backfired, and Evans won handily. During his tenure, Evans was one of the most liberal members of the House, and probably Illinois' most liberal congressman from outside Chicago. A founding member of the Congressional Progressive Caucus, and the House Populist Caucus he had a near-perfect lifetime rating from Americans for Democratic Action, while the American Conservative Union gave him its lowest rating of any Illinois congressman outside Chicago.

Evans was one of 31 Democrats in the House of Representatives to vote to reject Ohio's 20 electoral votes in the 2004 presidential election, despite Republican President George W. Bush winning the state by 118,457 votes.

In 2019 his biography Guts: The Lane Evans Story, authored by Devin Hansen, was published by Strong Arm Press.

== FEC actions ==
On June 27, 2005, Evans' campaign committee agreed to pay $185,000 to settle an investigation by the Federal Election Commission. The inquiry stemmed from allegations of illegal coordination between the 17th District Victory Fund, the Rock Island Democratic Central Committee and the congressman's campaign during the 1998 and 2000 election cycles. According to the FEC press release:

The FEC contended that the Evans Committee created the Victory Fund during the 1998 election cycle in order to assist with the Congressman's reelection campaign. The Evans Committee then largely directed the Victory Fund's operations during the 1998 and 2000 election cycles. During this period the Victory Fund raised and spent more than $500,000. Congressman Evans and his staff raised a majority of the money contributed to the Victory Fund, including more than $200,000 in labor union treasury funds, which are prohibited in federal campaigns. The Victory Fund spent at least $330,000 on voter identification and get-out-the-vote activities promoting Congressman Evans. The FEC found that these campaign focused activities were so closely coordinated with the campaign that they represented contributions from the Victory Fund to Evans. The contributions exceeded federal limits and included funds from prohibited sources, in violation of FECA.

The Rock Island Democratic Central Committee, for its part, agreed to a civil penalty of $30,000.

== Retirement and death ==
Evans won the Democratic primary in 2006 and was poised for a rematch against Zinga. On March 28, 2006, however, Evans announced that he would not stand for a 13th term that November. He made a brief return to Washington in June 2006. His withdrawal from the general election left local Democrats with the task of finding a replacement candidate. Their choice was Congressman Evans' district director, Phil Hare, who was elected. On November 5, 2014, Evans died at the age of 63 in a nursing home in East Moline, Illinois, from complications brought on by Parkinson's disease.

== Electoral history ==
Illinois's 17th congressional district election, 1982
Party	Candidate	Votes	%
Democratic	Lane Evans (incumbent)	94,483	52.84
Republican	Kenneth McMillan	84,347	47.16
Total votes		178,830	100.00
Democratic hold			

Illinois's 17th congressional district election, 1984
Party	Candidate	Votes	%
Democratic	Lane Evans (incumbent)	128,273	56.67
Republican	Kenneth McMillan	98,069	43.33
Total votes		226,342	100.00
Democratic hold			

Illinois's 17th congressional district election, 1986
Party	Candidate	Votes	%
Democratic	Lane Evans (incumbent)	85,442	55.65
Republican	Sam McHard	68,101	44.35
Total votes		153,543	100.00
Democratic hold			

*

Illinois's 17th congressional district election, 1988
Party	Candidate	Votes	%
Democratic	Lane Evans (incumbent)	132,130	64.87
Republican	William E. Stewart	71,560	35.13
Total votes		203,690	100.00
Democratic hold			

Illinois's 17th congressional district election, 1992
Party	Candidate	Votes	%
Democratic	Lane Evans (incumbent)	102,062	66.52
Republican	Dan Lee	51,380	33.48
Total votes		153,442	100.00
Democratic hold			

Illinois's 17th congressional district election, 1992
Party	Candidate	Votes	%
Democratic	Lane Evans (incumbent)	156,233	60.10
Republican	Kenneth Schloemer	103,719	39.90
Total votes		259,952	100.00
Democratic hold			

Illinois's 17th congressional district election, 1994
Party	Candidate	Votes	%
Democratic	Lane Evans (incumbent)	95,312	54.53
Republican	Jim Anderson	79,471	45.47
Total votes		174,783	100.00
Democratic hold			

Illinois's 17th congressional district election, 1996
Party	Candidate	Votes	%
Democratic	Lane Evans (incumbent)	120,008	51.913
Republican	Mark W. Bakerr	109,240	47.254
Libertarian	William J. Herrman	1,925	0.833
Total votes		231,173	100.00
Democratic hold			

Illinois's 17th congressional district election, 1998
Party	Candidate	Votes	%
Democratic	Lane Evans (incumbent)	100,128	51.56
Republican	Mark W. Bakerr	94,072	48.44
Total votes		194,200	100.00
Democratic hold			

=== 2000 ===
Illinois's 17th congressional district election, 2000
Party	Candidate	Votes	%
Democratic	Lane Evans (incumbent)	132,494	54.90
Republican	R. Mark W. Baker	108,853	45.10
Total votes		241,347	100.00
Democratic hold			

Illinois's 17th congressional district election, 2000
Party	Candidate	Votes	%
Democratic	Lane Evans (incumbent)	132,494	54.90
Republican	Mark W. Baker	108,853	45.10
Total votes		241,347	100.00
Democratic hold			

Illinois's 17th congressional district election, 2002
Party	Candidate	Votes	%
Democratic	Lane Evans (incumbent)	127,093	62.42
Republican	Peter Calderone	76,519	37.58
Total votes		203,612	100.00
Democratic hold			

Illinois's 17th congressional district election, 2004
Party	Candidate	Votes	%
Democratic	Lane Evans (incumbent)	172,320	60.68
Republican	Andrea Zingas	111,680	39.32
Total votes		284,000	100.00
Democratic hold			

== See also ==
- 21st Century Democrats — political party organization co-founded by Evans

U.S. House of Representatives
Preceded by George M. O'Brien	Member of the U.S. House of Representatives from Illinois's 17th congressional district 1983–2007	Succeeded by Phil Hare
Preceded by Sonny Montgomery	Ranking Member of the House Veterans' Affairs Committee; 1997–2007	Succeeded by Steve Buyer
