= Bill Edley =

American politician

Member of the Western Illinois University Board of Trustees
- In office January 2005 – August 2005
- Preceded by: Ted Brunsvold
- Succeeded by: Robert Cook

Member of the Illinois House of Representatives from the 95th district
- In office January 1989 – January 1995
- Preceded by: Leroy A. Ufkes
- Succeeded by: Richard P. Myers

Personal details
- Born: March 16, 1948 (age 78) Canton, Illinois, U.S.
- Party: Democratic
- Spouse: Kathryn Woodworth Edley
- Children: 2
- Education: University of Illinois (BS); London School of Economics (MEc)
- Profession: Business owner Public administrator

Bill Edley (born March 16, 1948) is an American businessman and Democratic politician from Illinois.

== Early life ==
Bill Edley was born March 16, 1948, in Canton, Illinois. He attended Spoon River College and received his bachelor's degree in investment finance from University of Illinois at Urbana–Champaign. While at the University of Illinois, he was the President of the Young Republicans and affiliated with the Republican Party until Richard Nixon and the Watergate scandal shifted his political leanings. From 1974 to 1989 he was owner and president of Automotive Wholesale, an auto parts store in Macomb and Monmouth. In 1985 he became president of the Macomb Area Chamber of Commerce. The next year he managed the race of Democrat George Lipper in the 95th district against Republican incumbent Kent Slater. Lipper, who received no outside help, lost. Edley was a delegate pledged to Paul Simon at the 1988 Democratic National Convention.

== Illinois House of Representatives ==
Slater then vacated the seat to run for a judgeship. In response to the candidacy of former State Senator and Republican Ken McMillan, Edley chose to run as the Democratic candidate. In an upset, Edley won the historically Republican 95th district by 2,000 votes. At that time, the 95th included all or parts of Fulton, Hancock, Henderson, McDonough and Schuyler counties. Slater resigned to take his judgeship and was succeeded by Leroy A. Ufkes for the period between Slater's resignation and Edley's inauguration.

During his tenure, he was a staunch critic of Jim Edgar. Edley, with fellow Democrat Thomas J. Homer, was an opponent of the decision to rebury the unearthed remains of Native Americans found at Dickson Mounds unburied. In 1994, he led a group of rural Democrats in support of a measure to end an increase in benefits for individuals on welfare who had more children after the effective date of the legislation. He lost reelection in 1994 to farmer Richard P. Myers.

== Post-legislative life ==
After his terms in the Illinois House, he became a financial consultant for Merrill Lynch, and a portfolio manager for Smith Barney. Edley, by then a resident of Peoria, ran as a delegate for the presidential campaign of Bill Bradley.

In 2004, Ted Brunsvold, the son of Joel Brunsvold, resigned from the Western Illinois University Board of Trustees. On December 16, 2004, Edley was appointed to complete this vacated term until January 2005 and then to serve a full term from January 2005 until January 2011. In August 2005, Edley resigned from the board to take employment with the Illinois Department of Corrections. Rod Blagojevich appointed Robert Cook to the vacancy.

In 2008, Edley explored a run for Congress from Illinois's 18th congressional district in the race to succeed Ray LaHood. When presumptive nominee Dick Versace dropped out of the race, he reiterated this interest. Ultimately, the Democratic county chairmen of the district chose Colleen Callahan who lost to Republican Aaron Schock.

In the 2010 Democratic primary, now a resident of Springfield, he ran for central committeeman from Illinois's 18th congressional district against incumbent James Polk of Peoria. The position of central committeeman serves as one of a congressional district's two representatives to the Democratic Party of Illinois; the other is a central committeewoman. Edley lost. As of 2014, Edley was still a resident of Springfield. As of 2017, he writes as a guest columnist for various newspapers including The State Journal-Register and the Quad-City Times. He has earned a Master's in Economic History from the London School of Economics.
