= 2002 United States House of Representatives elections in North Carolina =

- November 5, 2002

All 13 North Carolina seats in the United States House of Representatives
	Majority party	Minority party
Party	Republican	Democratic
Last election	7	5
Seats won	7	6
Seat change	Steady	▲1
Popular vote	1,209,033	970,716
Percentage	53.87%	43.26%
Swing	▼0.65%	▲0.29%

Republican
40–50%
50–60%
60–70%
70–80%
80–90%
90–100%
Democratic
40–50%
50–60%
60–70%
70–80%
80–90%

The United States House of Representative elections of 2002 in North Carolina were held on November 5, 2002, as part of the biennial elections to the United States House of Representatives. All thirteen seats in North Carolina, and 435 nationwide, were elected.

The election saw the number of represented elected from North Carolina increase by one after the 2000 census. The Republicans won seven seats, as in 2000, while the Democrats gained one to put them at six.

This election should not be confused with the 2002 North Carolina House of Representatives election, which was held on the same day.

== Summary ==
2002 United States House of Representative elections in North Carolina – Summary
Party	Seats	Gains	Losses	Net gain/loss	Seats %	Votes %	Votes	+/−
Republican	7	0	0	±0	53.85	53.87	1,209,033	–0.65
Democratic	6	1	0	±1	46.15	43.26	970,716	+0.29
Libertarian	0	0	0	±0	0	2.87	64,400	+0.37

== District 1 ==
2002 North Carolina's 1st congressional district election
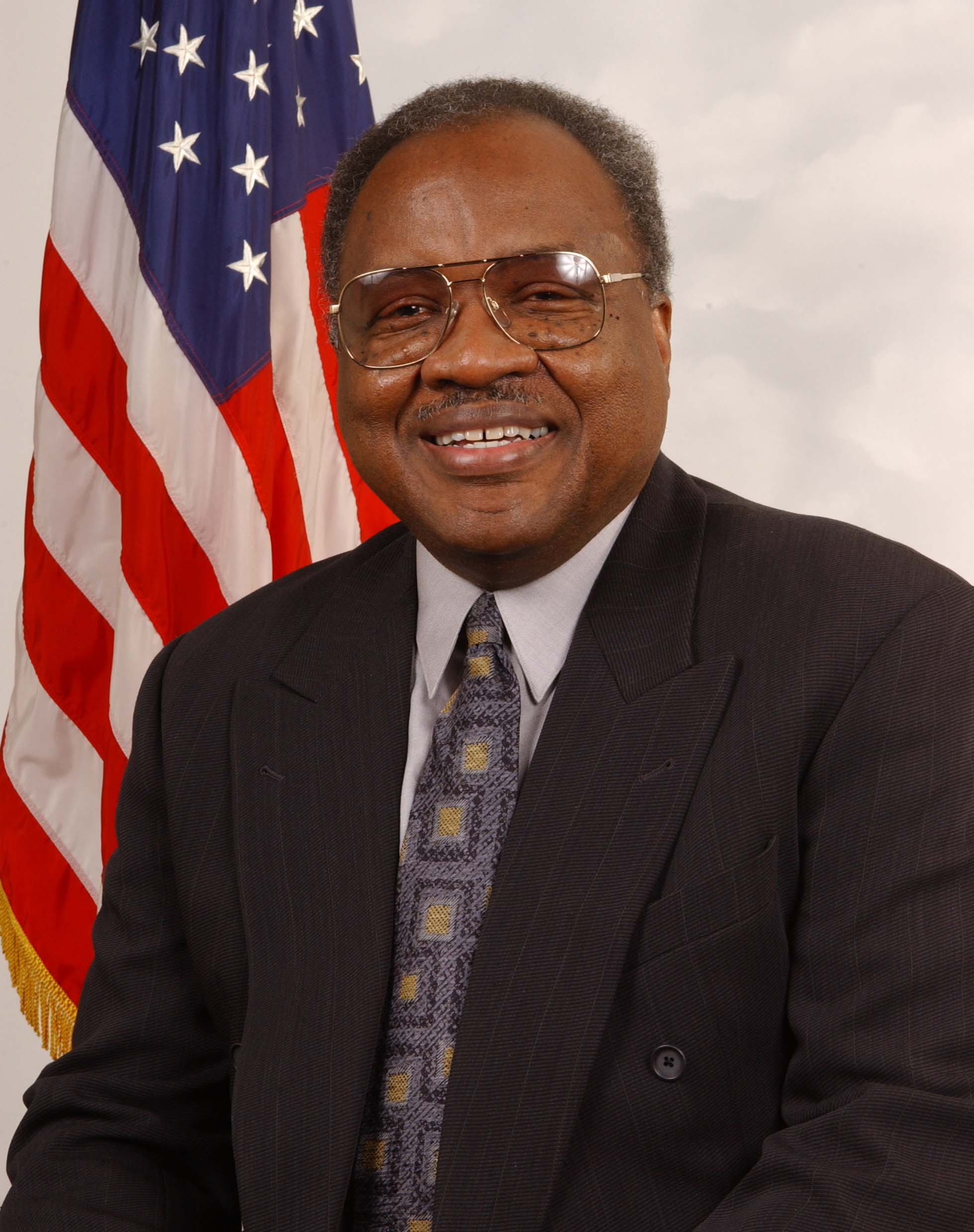

Nominee	Frank Ballance	Greg Dority
Party	Democratic	Republican
Popular vote	93,157	50,907
Percentage	63.7%	34.8%
- County results Frank W. Ballance: 50–60% 60–70% 70–80%
U.S. Representative before election
Eva Clayton
Democratic
Elected U.S. Representative
Frank Ballance
Democratic

=== Predictions ===
Source	Ranking	As of
Sabato's Crystal Ball	Safe D	November 4, 2002
New York Times	Safe D	October 14, 2002

2002 United States House of Representatives North Carolina 1st District election
Party	Candidate	Votes	%	±%
Democratic	Frank Ballance	93,157	63.74	
Republican	Greg Dority	50,907	34.83	
Libertarian	Mike Ruff	2,093	1.43	
Turnout		146,157		

== District 2 ==
2002 North Carolina's 2nd congressional district election
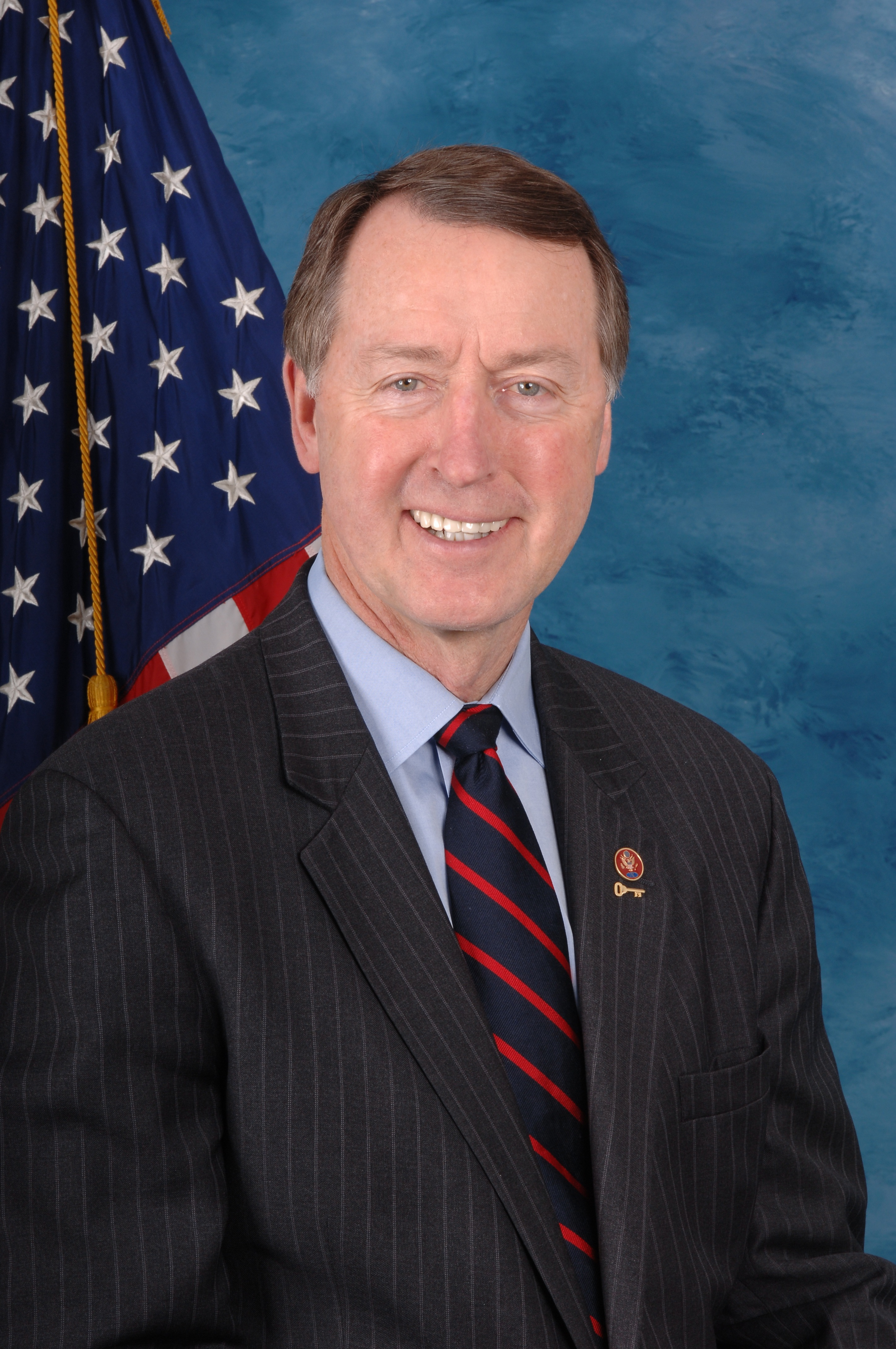

Nominee	Bob Etheridge	Joseph L. Ellen
Party	Democratic	Republican
Popular vote	100,121	50,965
Percentage	65.4%	33.3%
- County results Etheridge: 50–60% 60–70% 70–80%
U.S. Representative before election
Bob Etheridge
Democratic
Elected U.S. Representative
Bob Etheridge
Democratic

=== Predictions ===
Source	Ranking	As of
Sabato's Crystal Ball	Safe D	November 4, 2002
New York Times	Safe D	October 14, 2002

2002 United States House of Representatives North Carolina 2nd District election
Party	Candidate	Votes	%	±%
Democratic	Bob Etheridge (incumbent)	100,121	65.36	
Republican	Joseph L. Ellen	50,965	33.27	
Libertarian	Gary Minter	2,098	1.37	
Turnout		153,184		

== District 3 ==
2002 North Carolina's 3rd congressional district election
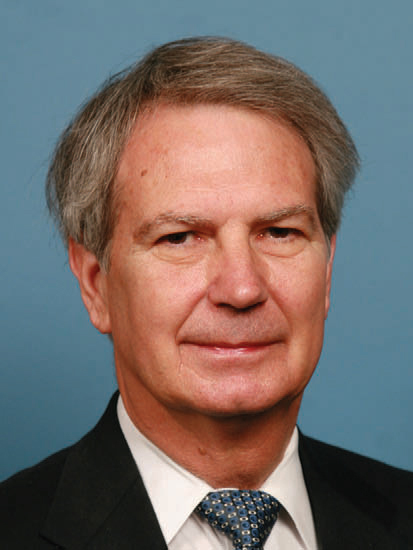

Nominee	Walter B. Jones Jr.	Gary Goodson
Party	Republican	Libertarian
Popular vote	131,448	13,486
Percentage	90.7%	9.3%
- County results Jones: 80–90% 90–100%
U.S. Representative before election
Walter B. Jones Jr.
Republican
Elected U.S. Representative
Walter B. Jones Jr.
Republican

=== Predictions ===
Source	Ranking	As of
Sabato's Crystal Ball	Safe R	November 4, 2002
New York Times	Safe R	October 14, 2002

2002 United States House of Representatives North Carolina 3rd District election
Party	Candidate	Votes	%	±%
Republican	Walter B. Jones Jr. (incumbent)	131,448	90.70	
Libertarian	Gary Goodson	13,486	9.30	
Turnout		144,934		

== District 4 ==
2002 North Carolina's 4th congressional district election
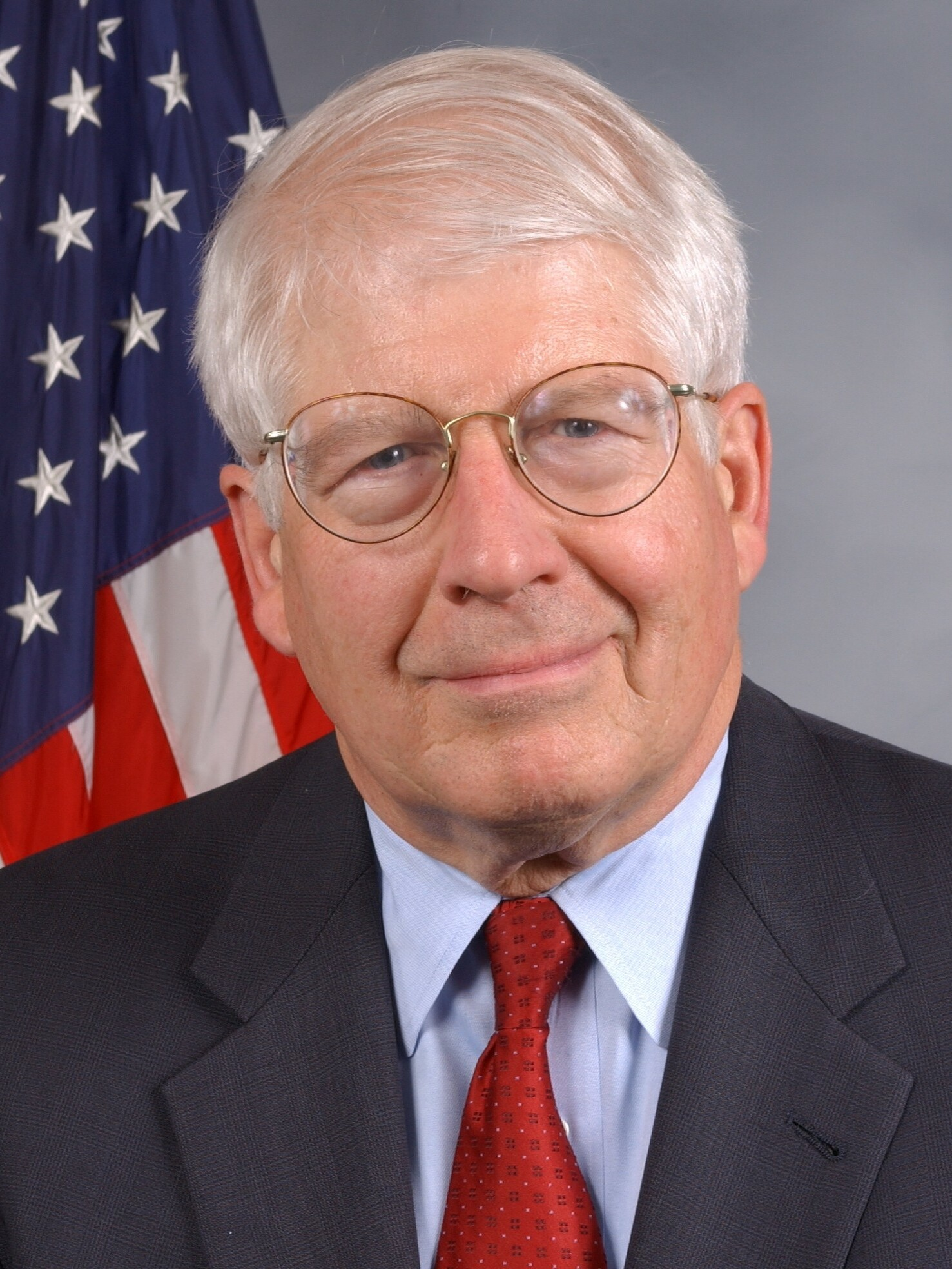

Nominee	David Price	Tuan A. Nguyen
Party	Democratic	Republican
Popular vote	132,185	78,095
Percentage	61.2%	36.1%
- County results Price: 40–50% 60–70% 70–80%
U.S. Representative before election
David Price
Democratic
Elected U.S. Representative
David Price
Democratic

=== Predictions ===
Source	Ranking	As of
Sabato's Crystal Ball	Safe D	November 4, 2002
New York Times	Safe D	October 14, 2002

2002 United States House of Representatives North Carolina 4th District election
Party	Candidate	Votes	%	±%
Democratic	David Price (incumbent)	132,185	61.18	
Republican	Tuan A. Nguyen	78,095	36.15	
Libertarian	Ken Nelson	5,766	2.67	
Turnout		216,046		

== District 5 ==
2002 North Carolina's 5th congressional district election
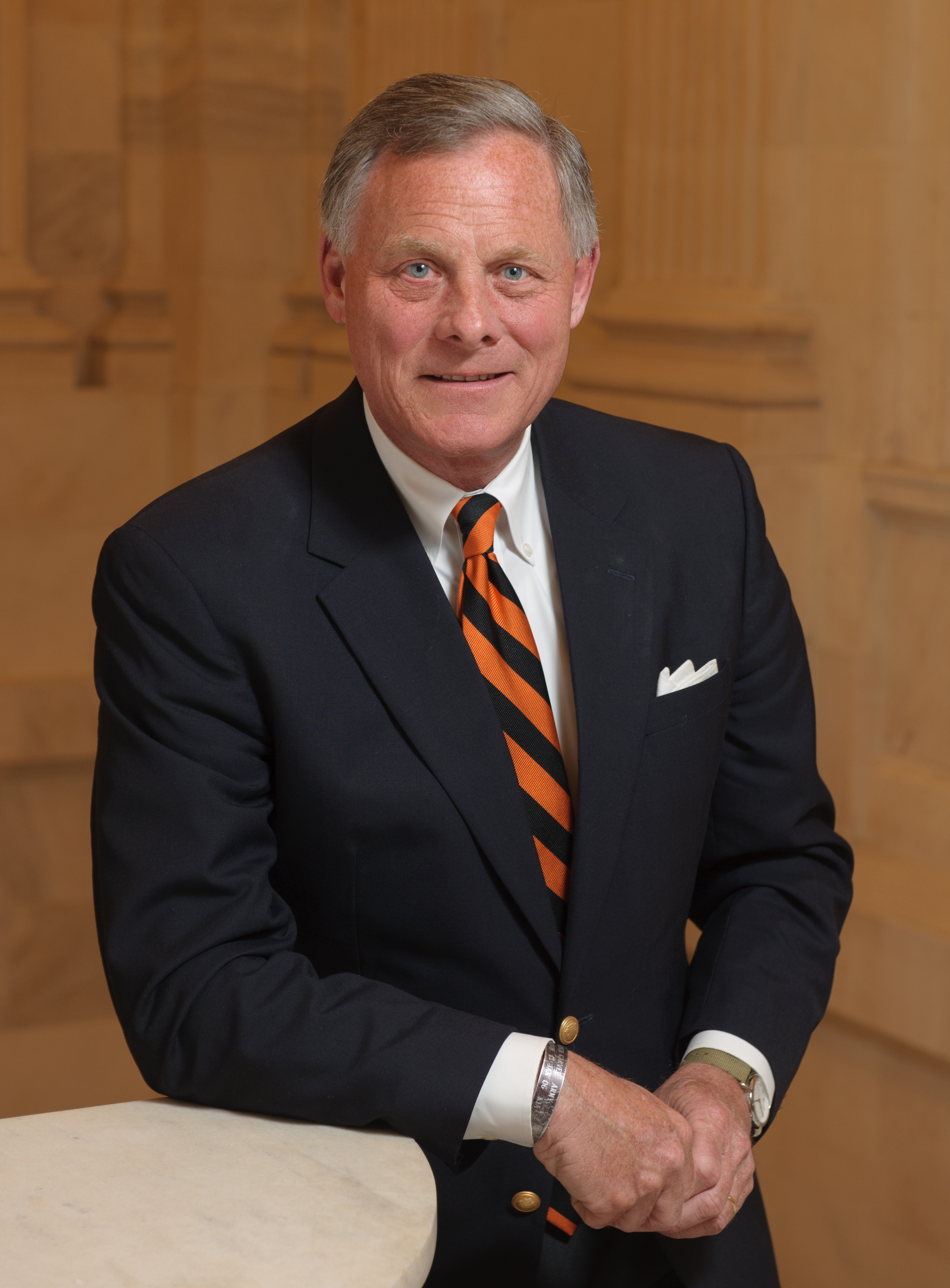

Nominee	Richard Burr	David Crawford
Party	Republican	Democratic
Popular vote	137,879	58,558
Percentage	70.2%	29.8%
- County results Burr: 50–60% 60–70% 70–80% 80–90%
U.S. Representative before election
Richard Burr
Republican
Elected U.S. Representative
Richard Burr
Republican

=== Predictions ===
Source	Ranking	As of
Sabato's Crystal Ball	Safe R	November 4, 2002
New York Times	Safe R	October 14, 2002

2002 United States House of Representatives North Carolina 5th District election
Party	Candidate	Votes	%	±%
Republican	Richard Burr (incumbent)	137,879	70.19	
Democratic	David Crawford	58,558	29.81	
Turnout		196,437		

== District 6 ==
2002 North Carolina's 6th congressional district election
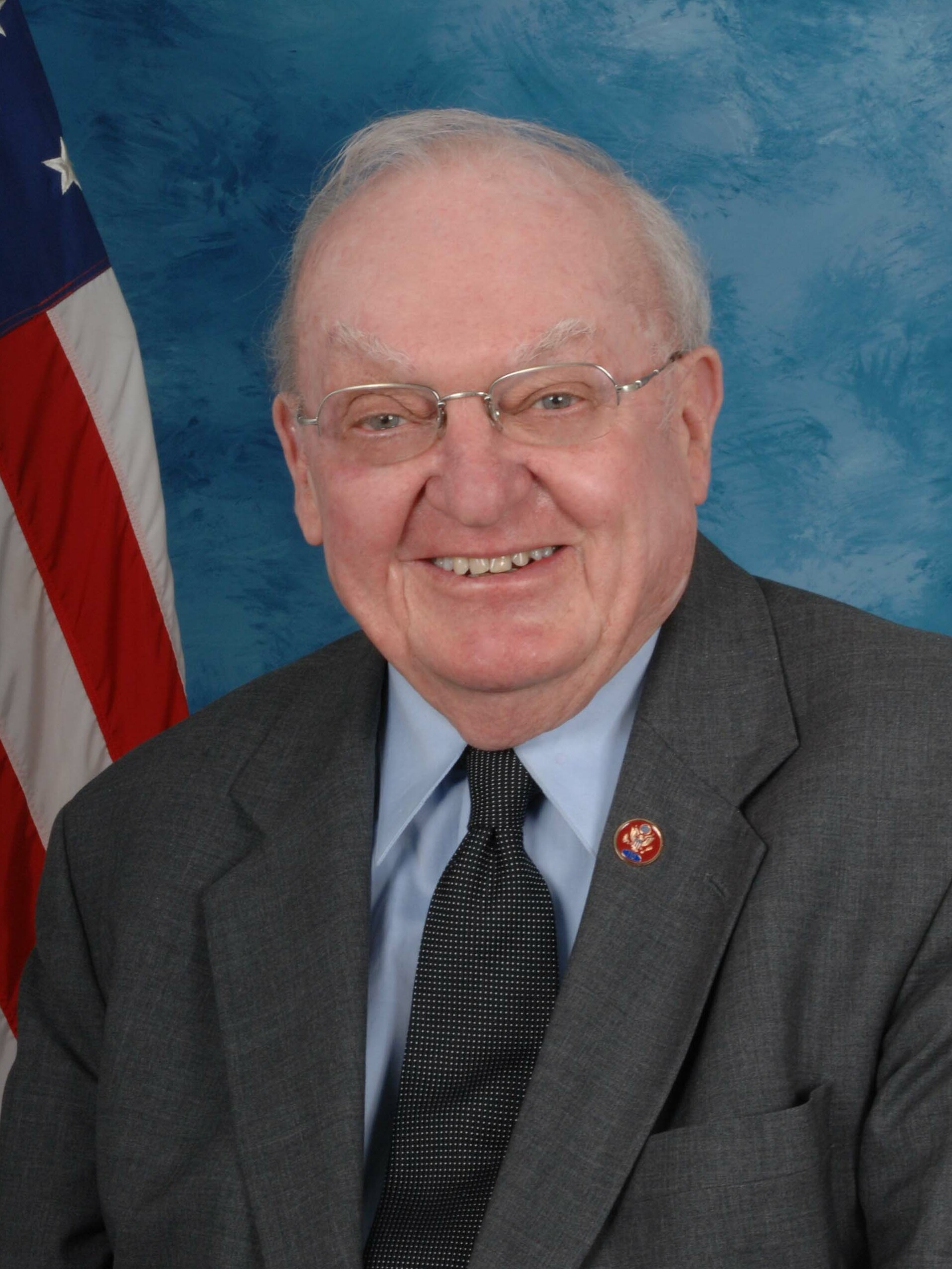

Nominee	Howard Coble	Tara Grubb
Party	Republican	Libertarian
Popular vote	151,430	16,067
Percentage	90.4%	9.6%
- County results Coble: 80–90% 90–100%
U.S. Representative before election
Howard Coble
Republican
Elected U.S. Representative
Howard Coble
Republican

=== Predictions ===
Source	Ranking	As of
Sabato's Crystal Ball	Safe R	November 4, 2002
New York Times	Safe R	October 14, 2002

2002 United States House of Representatives North Carolina 6th District election
Party	Candidate	Votes	%	±%
Republican	Howard Coble (incumbent)	151,430	90.41	
Libertarian	Tara Grubb	16,067	9.59	
Turnout		167,497		

== District 7 ==
2002 North Carolina's 7th congressional district election
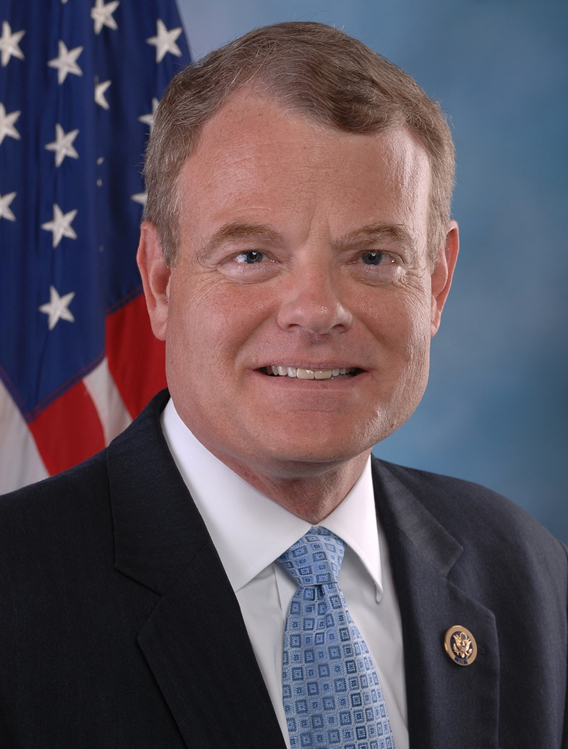

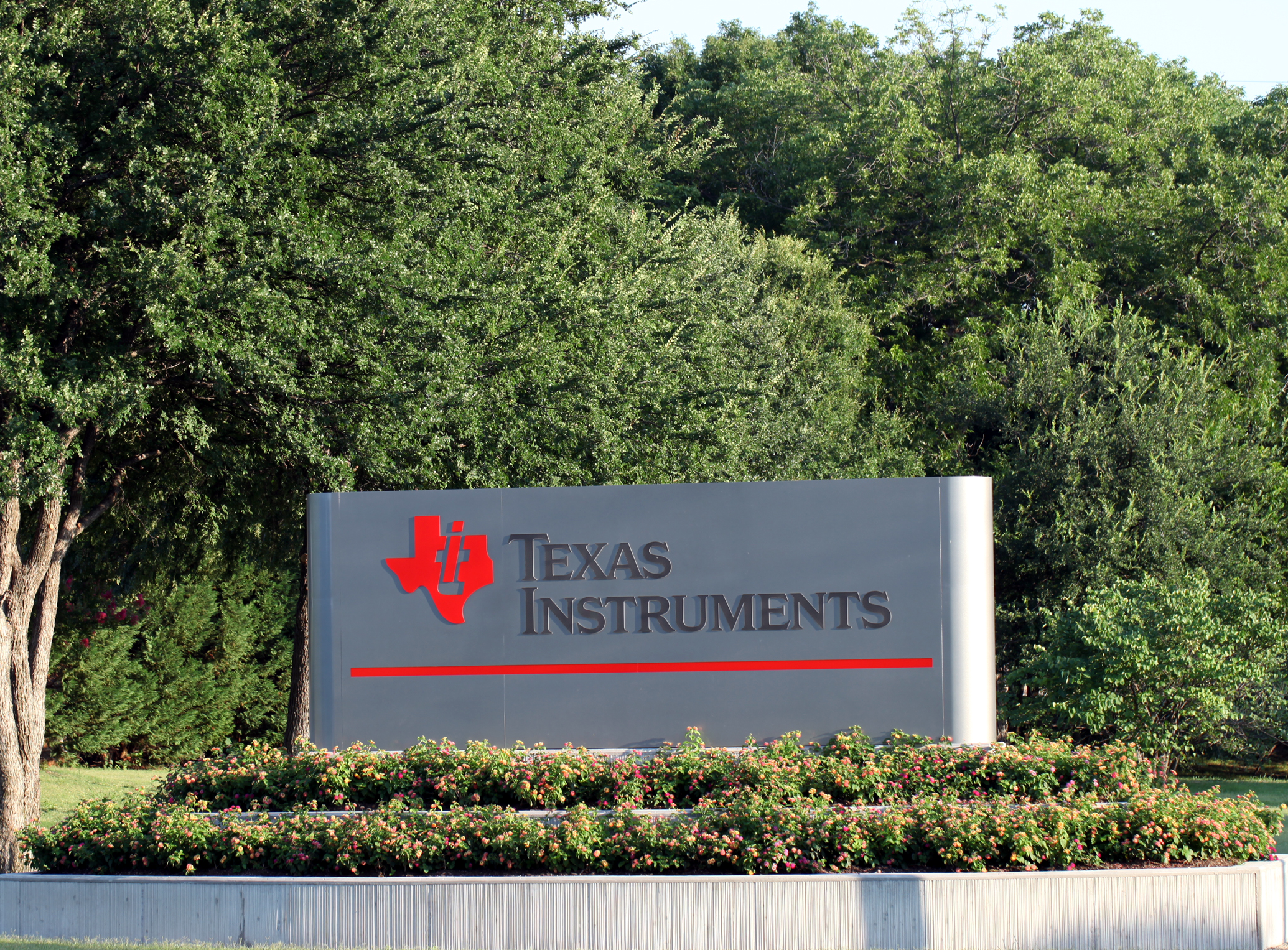
Nominee	Mike McIntyre	James R. Adams
Party	Democratic	Republican
Popular vote	118,543	45,537
Percentage	71.1%	27.3%
- County results Mcintyre: 60–70% 70–80% 80–90% Adams: 50–60%
U.S. Representative before election
Mike McIntyre
Democratic
Elected U.S. Representative
Mike McIntyre
Democratic

=== Predictions ===
Source	Ranking	As of
Sabato's Crystal Ball	Safe D	November 4, 2002
New York Times	Safe D	October 14, 2002

2002 United States House of Representatives North Carolina 7th District election
Party	Candidate	Votes	%	±%
Democratic	Mike McIntyre (incumbent)	118,543	71.13	
Republican	James R. Adams	45,537	27.32	
Libertarian	David Michael Brooks	2,574	1.54	
Turnout		166,654		

== District 8 ==
2002 North Carolina's 8th congressional district election
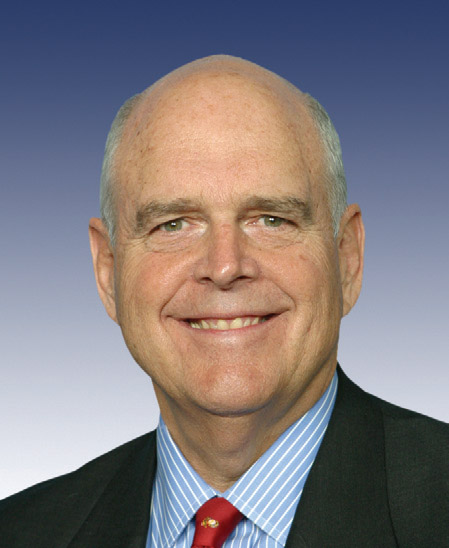

Nominee	Robin Hayes	Chris Kouri
Party	Republican	Democratic
Popular vote	80,298	66,819
Percentage	53.6%	44.6%
- County results Hayes: 50–60% 60–70% Kouri: 50–60% 60–70%
U.S. Representative before election
Robin Hayes
Republican
Elected U.S. Representative
Robin Hayes
Republican

=== Predictions ===
Source	Ranking	As of
Sabato's Crystal Ball	Lean R	November 4, 2002
New York Times	Lean R	October 14, 2002

2002 United States House of Representatives North Carolina 8th District election
Party	Candidate	Votes	%	±%
Republican	Robin Hayes (incumbent)	80,298	53.63	
Democratic	Chris Kouri	66,819	44.62	
Libertarian	Mark Andrew Johnson	2,619	1.75	
Turnout		149,736		

== District 9 ==
2002 North Carolina's 9th congressional district election
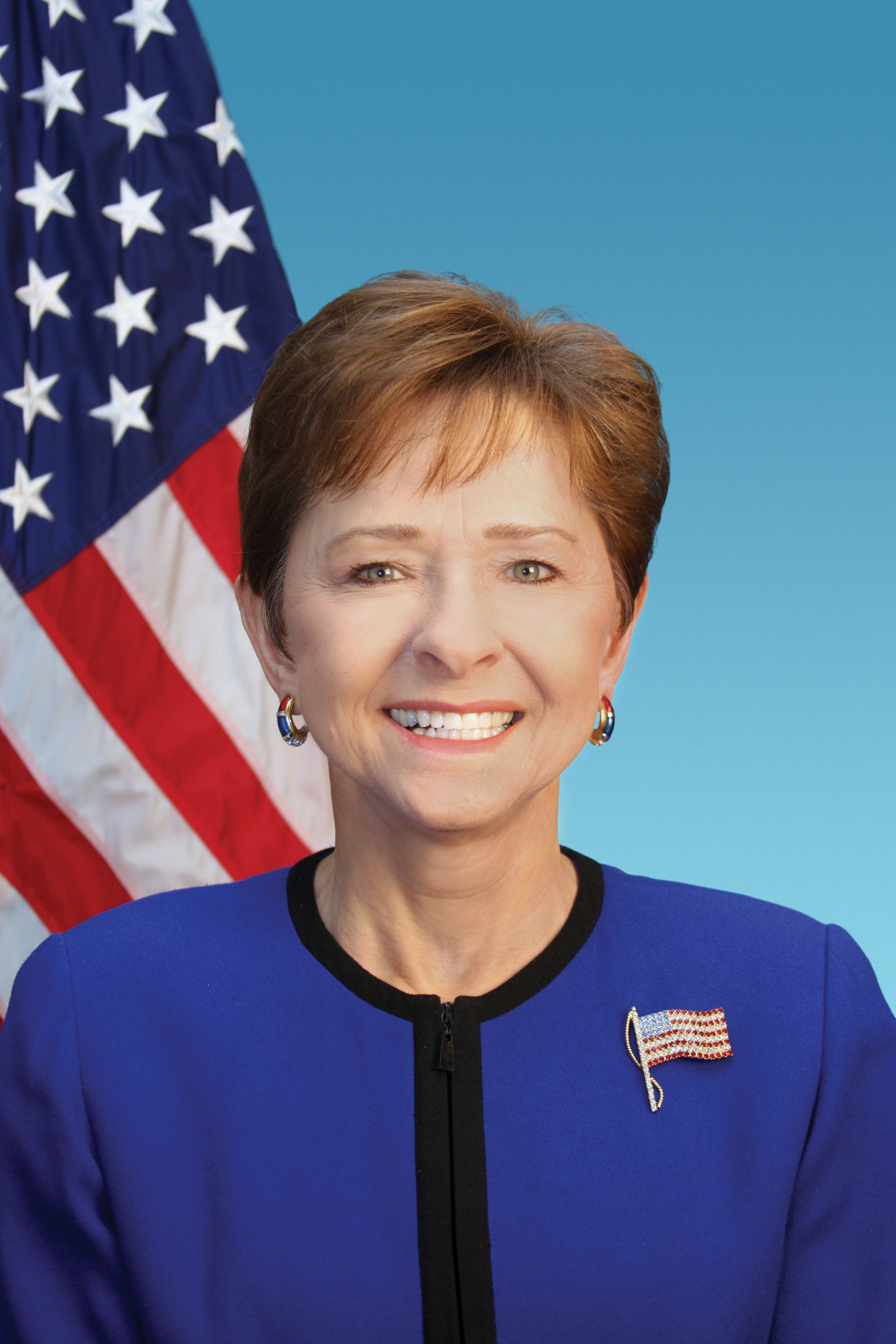

Nominee	Sue Wilkins Myrick	Ed McGuire
Party	Republican	Democratic
Popular vote	140,095	49,974
Percentage	72.4%	25.8%
- County results Myrick: 70–80%
U.S. Representative before election
Sue Wilkins Myrick
Republican
Elected U.S. Representative
Sue Wilkins Myrick
Republican

=== Predictions ===
Source	Ranking	As of
Sabato's Crystal Ball	Safe R	November 4, 2002
New York Times	Safe R	October 14, 2002

2002 United States House of Representatives North Carolina 9th District election
Party	Candidate	Votes	%	±%
Republican	Sue Wilkins Myrick (incumbent)	140,095	72.42	
Democratic	Ed McGuire	49,974	25.83	
Libertarian	Chris Cole	3,374	1.74	
Turnout		193,443		

== District 10 ==
2002 North Carolina's 10th congressional district election
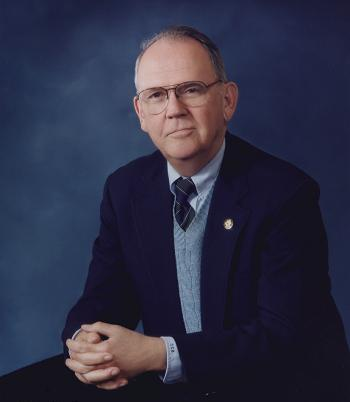

Nominee	Cass Ballenger	Ron Daugherty
Party	Republican	Democratic
Popular vote	102,768	65,587
Percentage	59.3%	37.9%
- County results Ballenger: 50–60% 60–70% 70–80%
U.S. Representative before election
Cass Ballenger
Republican
Elected U.S. Representative
Cass Ballenger
Republican

=== Predictions ===
Source	Ranking	As of
Sabato's Crystal Ball	Safe R	November 4, 2002
New York Times	Safe R	October 14, 2002

2002 United States House of Representatives North Carolina 10th District election
Party	Candidate	Votes	%	±%
Republican	Cass Ballenger (incumbent)	102,768	59.30	
Democratic	Ron Daugherty	65,587	37.85	
Libertarian	Christopher M. Hill	4,937	2.85	
Turnout		173,292		

== District 11 ==
2002 North Carolina's 11th congressional district election
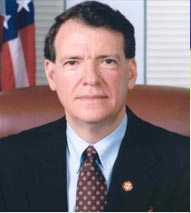

Nominee	Charles H. Taylor	Sam Neill
Party	Republican	Democratic
Popular vote	112,335	86,664
Percentage	55.5%	42.9%
- County results Taylor: 40–50% 50–60% 60–70% Neill: 50–60%
U.S. Representative before election
Charles H. Taylor
Republican
Elected U.S. Representative
Charles H. Taylor
Republican

=== Predictions ===
Source	Ranking	As of
Sabato's Crystal Ball	Safe R	November 4, 2002
New York Times	Safe R	October 14, 2002

2002 United States House of Representatives North Carolina 11th District election
Party	Candidate	Votes	%	±%
Republican	Charles H. Taylor (incumbent)	112,335	55.54	
Democratic	Sam Neill	86,664	42.85	
Libertarian	Eric Henry	3,261	1.61	
Turnout		202,260		

== District 12 ==
2002 North Carolina's 12th congressional district election
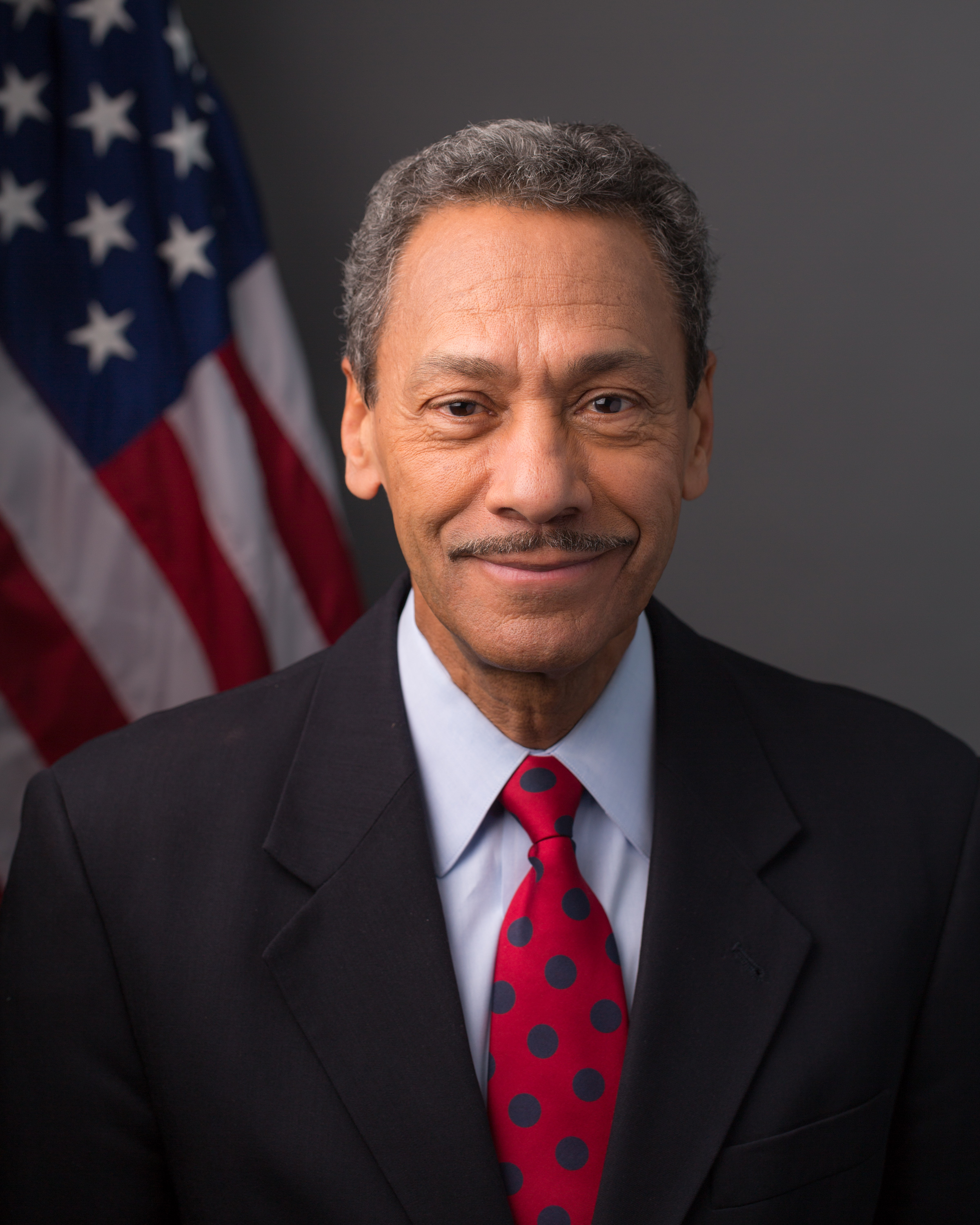

Nominee	Mel Watt	Jeff Kish
Party	Democratic	Republican
Popular vote	98,821	49,588
Percentage	65.3%	32.8%
- County results Watt: 50–60% 60–70% 70–80% Kish: 50–60% 60–70%
U.S. Representative before election
Mel Watt
Democratic
Elected U.S. Representative
Mel Watt
Democratic

=== Predictions ===
Source	Ranking	As of
Sabato's Crystal Ball	Safe D	November 4, 2002
New York Times	Safe D	October 14, 2002

2002 United States House of Representatives North Carolina 12th District election
Party	Candidate	Votes	%	±%
Democratic	Mel Watt (incumbent)	98,821	65.34	
Republican	Jeff Kish	49,588	32.79	
Libertarian	Carey Head	2,830	1.87	
Turnout		151,239		

== District 13 ==
2002 North Carolina's 13th congressional district election
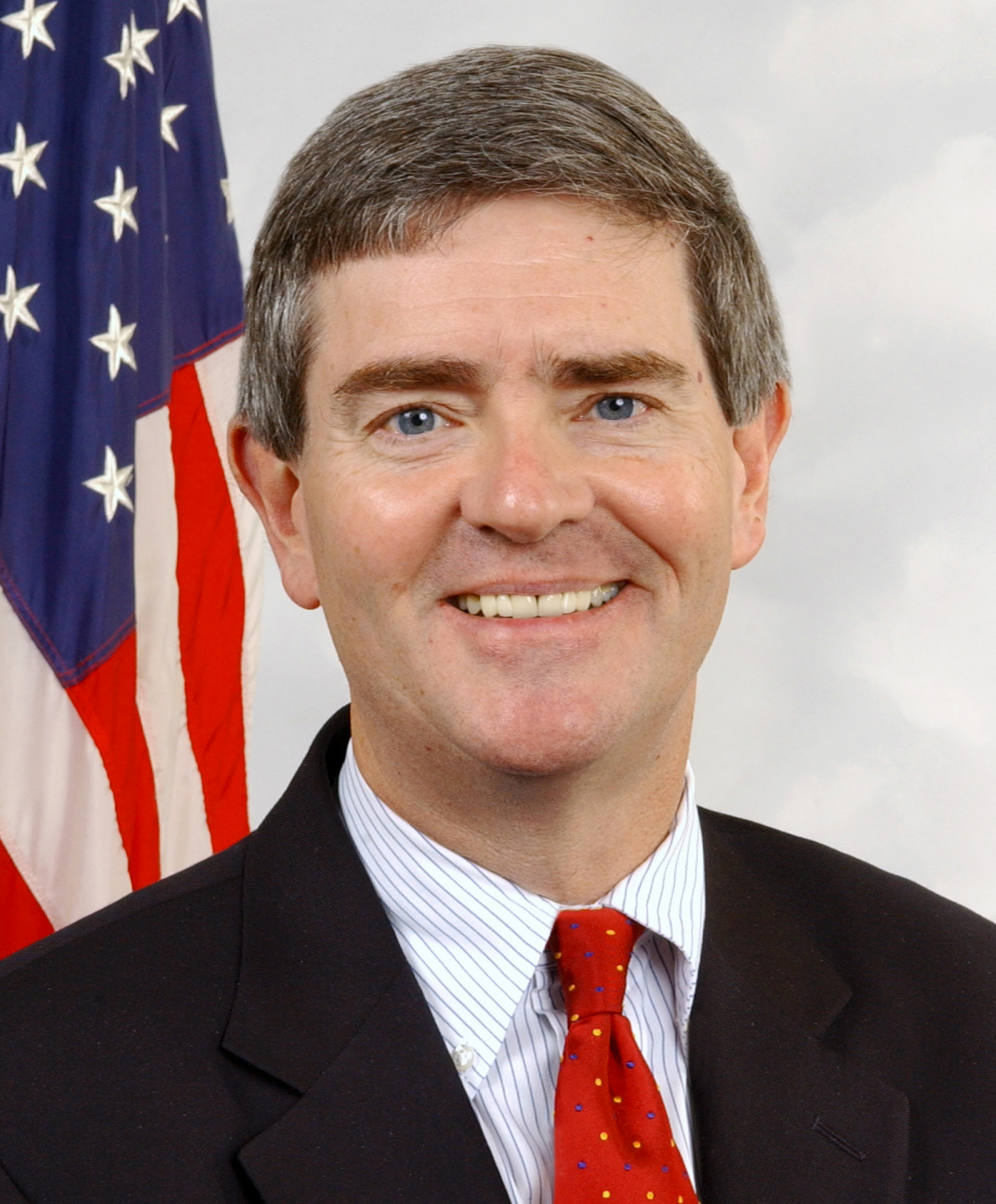

Nominee	Brad Miller	Carolyn W. Grant
Party	Democratic	Republican
Popular vote	100,287	77,688
Percentage	54.7%	42.4%
- County results Miller: 50–60% 60–70%
U.S. Representative before election
(None)
New district
Elected U.S. Representative
Brad Miller
Democratic

=== Predictions ===
Source	Ranking	As of
Sabato's Crystal Ball	Safe D (flip)	November 4, 2002
New York Times	Safe D (flip)	October 14, 2002

2002 United States House of Representatives North Carolina 13th District election
Party	Candidate	Votes	%	±%
Democratic	Brad Miller	100,287	54.72	
Republican	Carolyn W. Grant	77,688	42.39	
Libertarian	Alex MacDonald	5,295	2.89	
Turnout		183,270		
