= George Saal =

American politician and businessman

George L. Saal

Illinois House of Representatives
- In office 1954–1968

Tazewell County Board
- In office 1946–1950

Tazewell County Sheriff
- In office 1950–1962

Personal details
- Born: December 2, 1918 Pekin, Illinois, US
- Died: July 21, 1996 (aged 77) Peoria, Illinois, US
- Party: Democrat
- Military career
- Branch: Marine Corps
- Service years: World War II

George L. Saal (December 2, 1918 – July 21, 1996) was an American politician and businessman.

Saal was born in Pekin, Illinois. He served in the United States Marine Corps during World War II. Saal was involved in the insurance business in Pekin, Illinois. Saal served on the Tazewell County Board from 1946 to 1950. He served as sheriff of Tazewell County from 1950 to 1954 and from 1958 to 1962. Saal was a Democrat. Saal served in the Illinois House of Representatives from 1954 to 1958, from 1962 to 1964, and from 1966 to 1968. Saal also worked for the Illinois Comptroller. Saal died at the Methodist Medical Center in Peoria, Illinois.
