= United States House Agriculture Subcommittee on Rural Development, Research, Biotechnology, and Foreign Agriculture =

Congressional subcommittee

The House Subcommittee on Rural Development, Research, Biotechnology, and Foreign Agriculture is a subcommittee within the House Agriculture Committee. Its jurisdiction includes rural development, farm security and family farming matters, foreign agricultural assistance, and trade promotion programs.

The subcommittee was previously known as the Subcommittee on Specialty Crops and Foreign Agriculture, but rural development was added to the subcommittee's portfolio at the start of the 110th Congress. During the 112th Congress, it acquired jurisdiction over research and biotechnology from the former Subcommittee on Conservation, Credit, Energy, and Research.

== Members, 112th Congress ==
Majority	Minority
Timothy V. Johnson, Illinois, Chairman; Glenn Thompson, Pennsylvania; Marlin Stutzman, Indiana; Austin Scott, Georgia; Randy Hultgren, Illinois; Vicky Hartzler, Missouri; Bobby Schilling, Illinois	Jim Costa, California, Ranking Member; Henry Cuellar, Texas; Peter Welch, Vermont; Terri Sewell, Alabama; Larry Kissell, North Carolina
Ex officio
Frank Lucas, Oklahoma	Collin Peterson, Minnesota
