= Kenneth G. McMillan =

American politician

- Born: September 7, 1942 (age 84); Macomb, Illinois
- Occupations: Illinois State Senator and college Professor

Academic background
- Education: University of Illinois

Academic work
- Discipline: Economist
- Institutions: Monmouth College (1989–2019)

Kenneth G. McMillan (born September 7, 1942) is an American politician and educator.

== Early life and career ==
Kenneth G. McMillan was born September 7, 1942 in Macomb, Illinois and raised on a farm near Walnut Grove, Illinois. He attended the University of Illinois Urbana-Champaign and earned a bachelor of science in agriculture and a master of science in agricultural economics. He served as the assistant director of legislation and the assistant to the president of the Illinois Agricultural Association. He later joined the staff of Congressman Leslie C. Arends and served as a confidential assistant and chief speechwriter for Secretary Earl Butz. At the time of his election to the Illinois Senate he was Ph.D. candidate at the University of Illinois and producer of purebred Suffolk sheep.

== Politics ==
In the 1976 general election, McMillan defeated chairman of the Mercer County Board of Supervisors and Democratic candidate Walter E. "Red" Medhurst. In 1978, McMillan was reelected, defeating activist and Democratic candidate Kathryn Harris.

The 47th district at the time included all of Hancock, Henderson, Warren, McDonough, Mercer, and portions of Henry and Knox. McMillan served as a Republican member of the Illinois State Senate from 1977 to 1983. During the 80th Illinois General Assembly, he was a member of the Committees on Appropriations II; Elections and Reapportionment; and Agriculture, Conservation and Energy. He also served as a member of the Illinois Economic and Fiscal Commission.

McMillan ran for U.S. Congress in 1982 on a conservative platform and defeated moderate Republican incumbent Tom Railsback. At the time, his state senate district covered much of the western portion of the congressional district. McMillan however lost in the general election to Democratic challenger Lane Evans by 6%.

== Post-Senate career ==
McMillan again ran against Evans in 1984 but lost by 14%. In 1988, McMillan then attempted a political comeback by running for an open seat in the Illinois House of Representatives, but was defeated by Democratic candidate Bill Edley in the Republican leaning district.

McMillan joined the faculty of Monmouth College in 1989, and by 1994, McMillan was a professor of economics at Monmouth College. In 2005, he was appointed to the Board of Directors of Western Illinois Economic Development Authority by the Warren County Board. In 2019, McMillan retired from teaching.
