= U.S. Route 67 in Illinois =

Section of United States Numbered Highway in Illinois, United States

U.S. Route 67
- US 67 highlighted in red

Route information
- Maintained by IDOT
- Length: 214.0 mi (344.4 km)
- Existed: 1931–present

Major junctions
- South end: US 67 in Alton
- I-72 / US 36 in Jacksonville; US 24 in Rushville; US 136 in Macomb; US 34 / IL 110 (CKC) in Monmouth
- North end: US 67 in Rock Island

Location
- Country: United States
- State: Illinois
- Counties: Madison, Jersey, Greene, Scott, Morgan, Cass, Schuyler, McDonough, Warren, Mercer, Rock Island

Highway system
- United States Numbered Highway System; List; Special; Divided; Illinois State Highway System; Interstate; US; State; Tollways; Scenic
← US 66	→ IL 68

U.S. Route 67 (US 67) is a component of the United States Numbered Highway System that connects Presidio, Texas, to Sabula, Iowa. In Illinois, it serves the western region of the state known as Forgottonia, named for the lack of regional transportation and infrastructure projects. The highway begins its path through the state by crossing the Clark Bridge over the Mississippi River from Missouri at Alton and heads northward through Jerseyville and Jacksonville before it crosses the Illinois River at Beardstown. The northern half of the route serves Macomb and Monmouth before it enters the Quad Cities. It leaves the state at Rock Island by crossing the Rock Island Centennial Bridge over the Mississippi River into Davenport, Iowa.

The roads that would become US 67 were once a part of the Burlington Way and Alton–Jacksonville Air Line auto trails from the 1910s through the end of the 1920s. In 1918, Illinois voters approved a 48-route state highway system. Among the new routes was Route 3, which connected Morrison and Chester by way of the Quad Cities, Monmouth, Beardstown, Jacksonville, Alton, and East St. Louis. US 67 was created in 1926, but it did not extend into Illinois until 1931. That year, US 67 signs were applied to Route 3 from Alton to Rock Island. In 1952, the highway was rerouted between Medora and Murrayville; an alternate route was applied to the former routing until 1964, when the alternate was renumbered Illinois Route 267 (IL 267). Since the 1980s, a group called Corridor 67 has taken up the cause of advocating the widening of US 67 to a four-lane highway for the majority of its length. Widening the highway has been a popular project among politicians stumping in western Illinois. Although some piecemeal projects have taken place, a large percentage of the highway has not seen any upgrades despite there being other projects.

== Route description ==
US 67 enters Illinois at Alton on the Clark Bridge over the Mississippi River. Upon landing, the highway has a T intersection with IL 143; US 67 turns to the northwest to follow the river upstream. The roadway and adjacent railway separate Alton's downtown area from its riverfront. It turns north, roughly perpendicular to the river and intersects IL 100. As the highway curves out of Alton and into Godfrey, it passes beneath IL 3 and IL 111, but there is no direct connection between the two roadways. A short while later, IL 111 joins US 67 and the two routes run together for several miles. IL 111 splits away and joins IL 267 while US 67 continues northward and takes over the four-lane roadway as IL 255 ends. It runs generally to the northwest on a divided highway until Delhi, where it reduces down to two lanes. It passes through the heart of Jerseyville and intersects both IL 109 and IL 16. It continues north-northwest through flat, rolling farmland until it reaches Carrollton.

In Carrollton, US 67 meets IL 108 at the northeastern corner of the block on which the Greene County Courthouse sits. It then continues north and passes through Belltown and White Hall, in the latter of which, IL 106 splits off at a Y intersection and US 67 curves to the northeast. It then goes through Roodhouse and Manchester. A connection to Murrayville, aptly named Murrayville Road, provides a reminder of the former alignment of IL 267. The road then curves to the north and heads toward Jacksonville. There, three interchanges provide connections to differing parts of the city as US 67 does not enter the city limits. The first, with I-72 and US 36, connect South Jacksonville and eastern Jacksonville as well as Quincy and the state capital Springfield. The second, with Morton Avenue, a former alignment of US 36 and current Interstate business loop, provides access to central Jacksonville. The last, with IL 104, connects to northern and central Jacksonville. Past Jacksonville, US 67 is joined by IL 104.

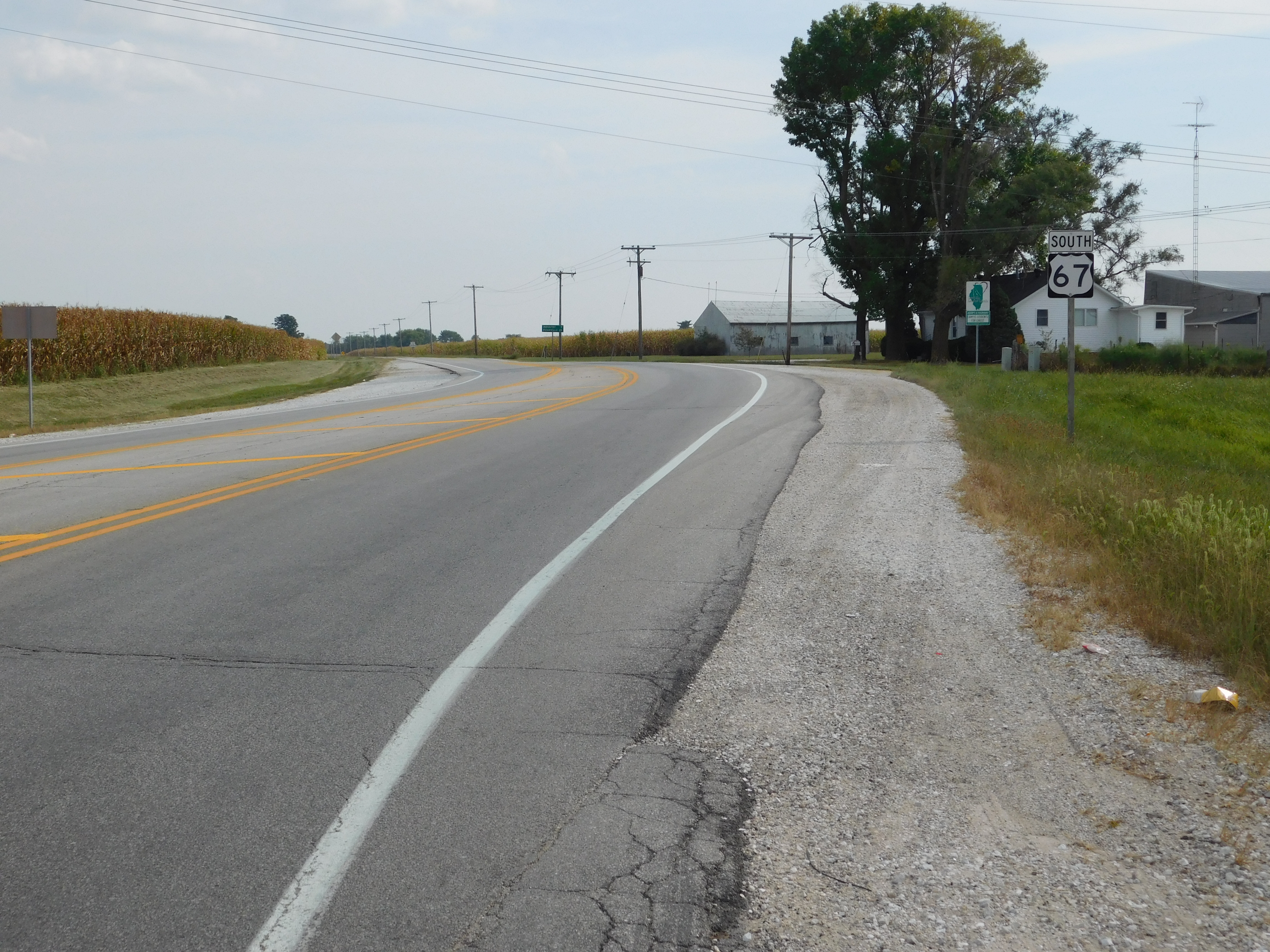
US 67 in McDonough County

US 67 and IL 104 head to the west-northwest though Chapin and Bethel. Shortly thereafter, the four-lane highway reduces down to two lanes once again. The highways are then joined by IL 100 right before IL 104 splits away to the west. US 67 and IL 100 head north, roughly parallel to the Illinois River until they reach Beardstown. There, they intersect IL 125 and then turn to the northwest to cross the river. On the other side, IL 100 splits off to the northeast, IL 103 heads west, and US 67 continues to the northwest through eastern Forgottonia. It meets US 24 in Rushville and IL 101 east of Littleton. It goes through Industry and connects with US 136 east of Macomb. These two routes head west into Macomb and split in the downtown area near Macomb station. From there, US 67 heads north past the campus of Western Illinois University and then becomes a four-lane highway before crossing the La Moine River. Farther north, it meets the present end of IL 336, at which the Chicago–Kansas City Expressway, signed IL 110, joins US 67.

Still heading north, US 67 and IL 110 intersect IL 9 at Good Hope. They pass the small town of Swan Creek to the west and curve around Roseville. There, a business route passes through the downtown area; both the mainline and business route intersect IL 116. As the highway approaches Monmouth, the two routes are joined by US 34 from the west. The three routes head north along the western edge of Monmouth and they meet IL 164, which also joins. Carrying four routes, the highway curves to the east to run along the northern limits. There, US 67 splits away from the other three routes. Now on its own, US 67 heads north on a two-lane road. At the Warren–Mercer county line, there is a Y intersection with IL 135. The two routes head east along the county line until US 67 curves north and IL 135 splits off to the east toward Alexis. At Viola, it meets IL 17. The highway passes Matherville to the east and through Preemption on its way toward the Quad Cities.

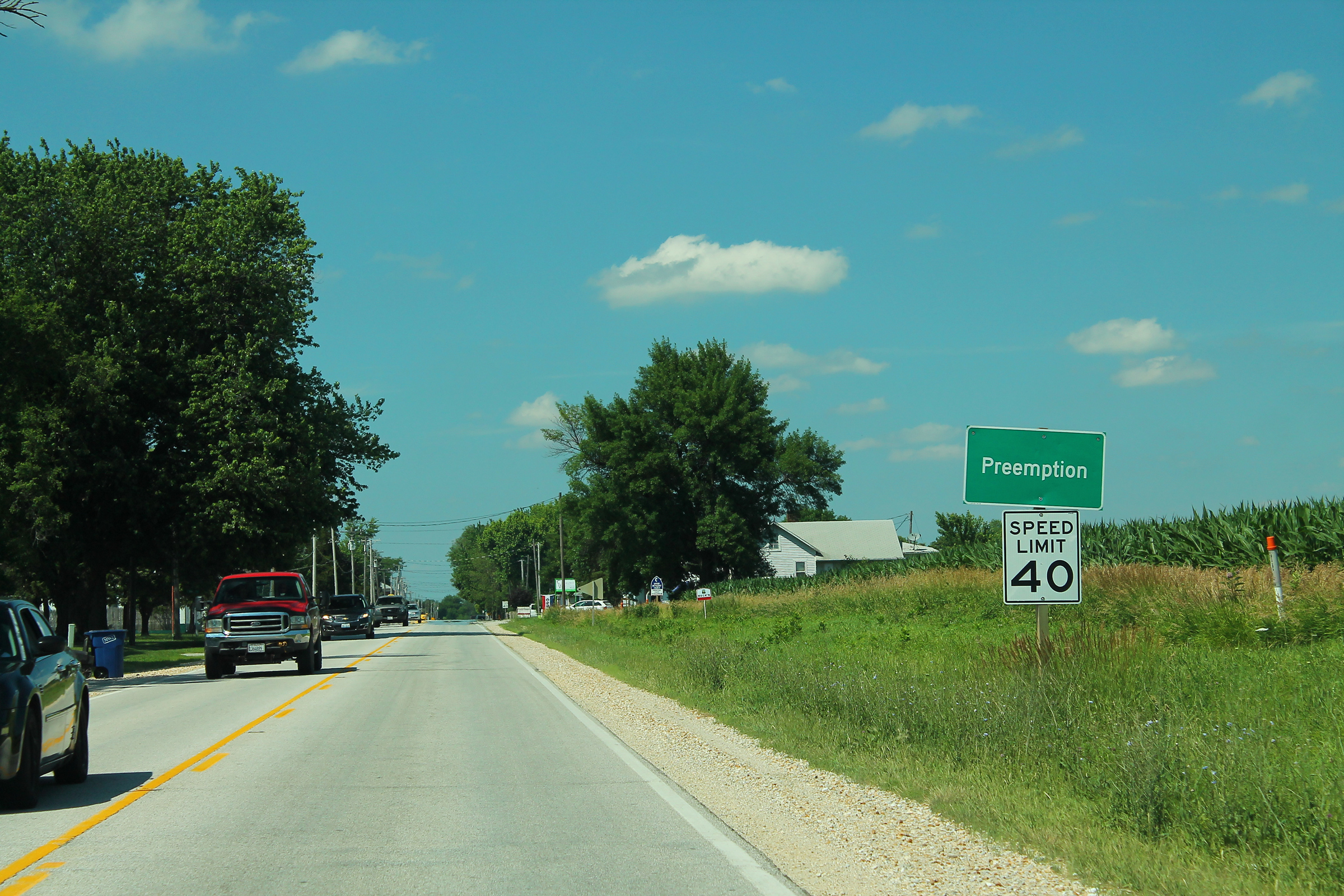
US 67 as it enters Preemption

South of Oak Grove, it meets IL 94, which is signed as a shortcut to Muscatine, Iowa, via IL 192. As it enters Milan, US 67 meets the Milan Beltway, a short expressway that connects to John Deere Road in Moline. It later passes beneath I-280, but there are no connecting ramps. Access to the Interstate is provided by Airport Road. After briefly entering downtown Milan, the road turns to the northwest and crosses the Hennepin Canal and two channels of the Rock River separated by Vandruff Island. On the other side of the river is Rock Island and the western end of IL 5. It travels north through the city on 11th Street. At 5th Avenue, US 67 becomes a one-way couplet with 4th Avenue while continuing on 11th Street provides a connection to IL 92. The one-way streets continue through downtown Rock Island, but US 67 turns north-northwest onto 15th Street. At the foot of the Rock Island Centennial Bridge, IL 92 passes beneath the highway. There is no direct access to IL 92 from northbound US 67 or from westbound IL 92 to southbound US 67. The roadway crosses the Mississippi River into Davenport, Iowa.

== History ==
US 67 is an original U.S. Highway that was designated in 1926, though its northern end was at U.S. Route 61 at Fredericktown, Missouri. The road that would become US 67 was first improved as an auto trail called The Burlington Way, later the Mississippi Valley Highway. In 1918, Illinois voters approved a bond package that created a 48-route highway system. Most of the Mississippi Valley Highway became Route 3. US 67 replaced Route 3 north of Alton in 1926.

=== Auto trails ===
Prior to the numbered highway system in Illinois, the state was served by auto trails that were individually maintained by associations made up of people who solicited donations from people who lived along the routes. The northern half of the route that would become US 67 was served by the Burlington Way, which was renamed the Mississippi Valley Highway in 1919. The Burlington Way had two branches in Illinois — one from Springfield to Gulfport, where it crossed into Iowa at Burlington, and one from Peoria to the Quad Cities. The two branches met near Monmouth. From Virginia to Alton, it followed the Great White Way and from Alton to East St. Louis, it followed the Alton Way. In later years, the Alton–Jacksonville Air Line also connected Jacksonville and Alton, but farther to the east.

=== State bond routes ===
Illinois Route 3
- Location: Morrison to Chester
- Existed: 1918–present
- History: Route north of East St. Louis became US 67 in 1930

In 1918, Illinois voters were given the opportunity to vote on a $60 million bond package (equivalent to $850 million in 2023) for the creation of a 48-route state highway system. Route 3 was planned from Morrison to Chester by way of the Quad Cities, Monmouth, Beardstown, Jacksonville, Alton, and East St. Louis. Early returns saw the measure pass 3-to-1 in favor in the Chicago area and nearly 6-to-1 in favor outside of Chicago. Officials said that surveying work could begin immediately and work on 4,800 miles (7,700 km) of paved highways could be finished in five or six years. Residents of Woodson got together with members of the Mississippi Valley Highway association in late 1920 to petition the state to have Route 3 pass through their community rather than one-half mile (800 m) to the west. By 1924, work on the initial system was nearly complete. Another $100 million bond package (equivalent to $1.41 billion in 2023) was floated to voters that November and passed by a large majority. The last sections of Route 3 to be paved were near Virginia in Cass County and between Ashland and Alexander in Morgan County.

=== U.S. Highway origins ===
The American Association of State Highway Officials (AASHO, now AASHTO) communicated to the director of the Illinois Department of Public Works and Buildings in early 1930 that they were going to extend US 67 north from Fredericktown to Davenport by way of Alton and most of Route 3 north of East St. Louis. The extended highway was to be slightly straighter than Route 3. Between Jacksonville and Virginia, Route 78 was a shorter route. The same could be said for Route 85 from Alexis to Rock Island. However, these short cuts were not paved upon US 67's designation, so Temporary US 67 signage was erected along Route 3 in those areas.

Not long after it was designated, people began to call for changes to the routing between Alton and Jerseyville. There were numerous accidents caused by the hills and curves along Route 3. It was suggested that the highway be rerouted through Godfrey and Delhi. The Jerseyville city council adopted a resolution proclaiming this in 1935 and sent a copy to President Franklin D. Roosevelt. It would not be until 1940 when the Delhi road was paved and US 67 shifted onto it. The new road was immediately successful as it was drawing heavy truck traffic by the end of 1940.

Flooding and ice floes on the Rock River in March 1937 wrought havoc on the two crossings at Vandruff Island between Milan and Rock Island. Men were standing at the feet of the closed bridges with poles trying to force chunks of ice underneath. Traffic was rerouted over the US 150 high bridge in Moline while the bridges were closed. The bridges were reopened after the waters receded and the ice could pass beneath them. On March 23, damage from the flood and ice became evident when the southern pier on the southern bridge began to fail. The bridge did not give way, but it did lean noticeably. The local highway supervisor noted that the pier rested on bedrock, so simply jacking up the bridge back into position would make it suitable for vehicular traffic. The bridge reopened at 7:30 pm on April 3, but closed an hour later when it began to sag once again. It reopened a few days later after the bridges beams were underpinned. A $1.5-million project (equivalent to $15.2 million in 2023) to replace the four bridges that connected Rock Island and Milan was completed in November 1949.

The highway was programmed to enter Illinois at Alton, but since it was AASHO policy then that no U.S. Highways crossed toll bridges, as the Clark Bridge was at the time, another temporary route was created so it would enter Illinois via the Free Bridge with US 66 and then north via Route 3 toward Alton. In March 1939, the Illinois Division of Highways announced some changes to the routing of US 67. The U.S. Highway would finally enter Illinois at Alton. The temporary routing from downtown St. Louis was to become US 67 Alternate. A few months later, on the eleventh anniversary of the opening of the Lewis Bridge and Clark Bridge, officials from St. Louis County, Missouri, announced that $450,000 of bonds (equivalent to $7.74 million in 2023) had been paid off and only a small amount of debt remained before the bridges would become a toll-free crossing.

=== Routing changes ===
Another US 67 Alternate was created in 1952 as a result of the construction of a 32-mile-long (51 km), straighter, and modern highway being built between Medora and Murrayville. State highway officials appealed to AASHO to reroute US 67 along IL 111 between the Y intersection at Godfrey to Medora and thence on the new highway to Murrayville. They wanted to reduce through traffic in Jerseyville, Carrollton, and White Hall and the new highway only went through the downtown area of Greenfield. The U.S. Route Numbering Committee approved both the new route and the alternate route on July 17. More route straightening occurred between Beardstown and Rushville. A new high bridge was opened in 1955 that replaced a 67-year-old wagon swing bridge. A contract to pave a direct route between the two cities was let in 1959. The new routing replaced a longer meandering route through Frederick, Pleasant View, and downtown Rushville. It was approved by AASHO by the end of 1960. In downtown Jacksonville, the mayor wanted to reduce the number of heavy trucks, especially those hauling gasoline or liquid propane, driving through the central business district. In the state's application to AASHO, they wanted to completely reroute the highway between Beardstown and Jacksonville. Instead of heading north through Virginia, the highway would then travel west along West Morton Road, which carried US 36 and US 54, then to the northwest over IL 104, and then IL 100 north to Beardstown. The application was approved and the state placed the new routing in effect on December 13, 1967.

The two alternate routes of US 67 in Illinois would not last through the mid-1960s. Citing improvements to US 67 and US 67 Bypass in the St. Louis area, Illinois highway officials felt the alternate route utilizing the MacArthur Bridge simply was no longer necessary. They would remumber the alternate route IL 3 upon approval. This change was approved by AASHO on June 19, 1963. The next year, officials sought to remove the other alternate route north of Godfrey because it was causing confusion among motorists. Instead, they wanted to number the western route IL 267. This change received assent from AASHO on December 6, 1964. Signage on the former alternate route was changed around April 1, 1965.

=== Clark Bridge ===
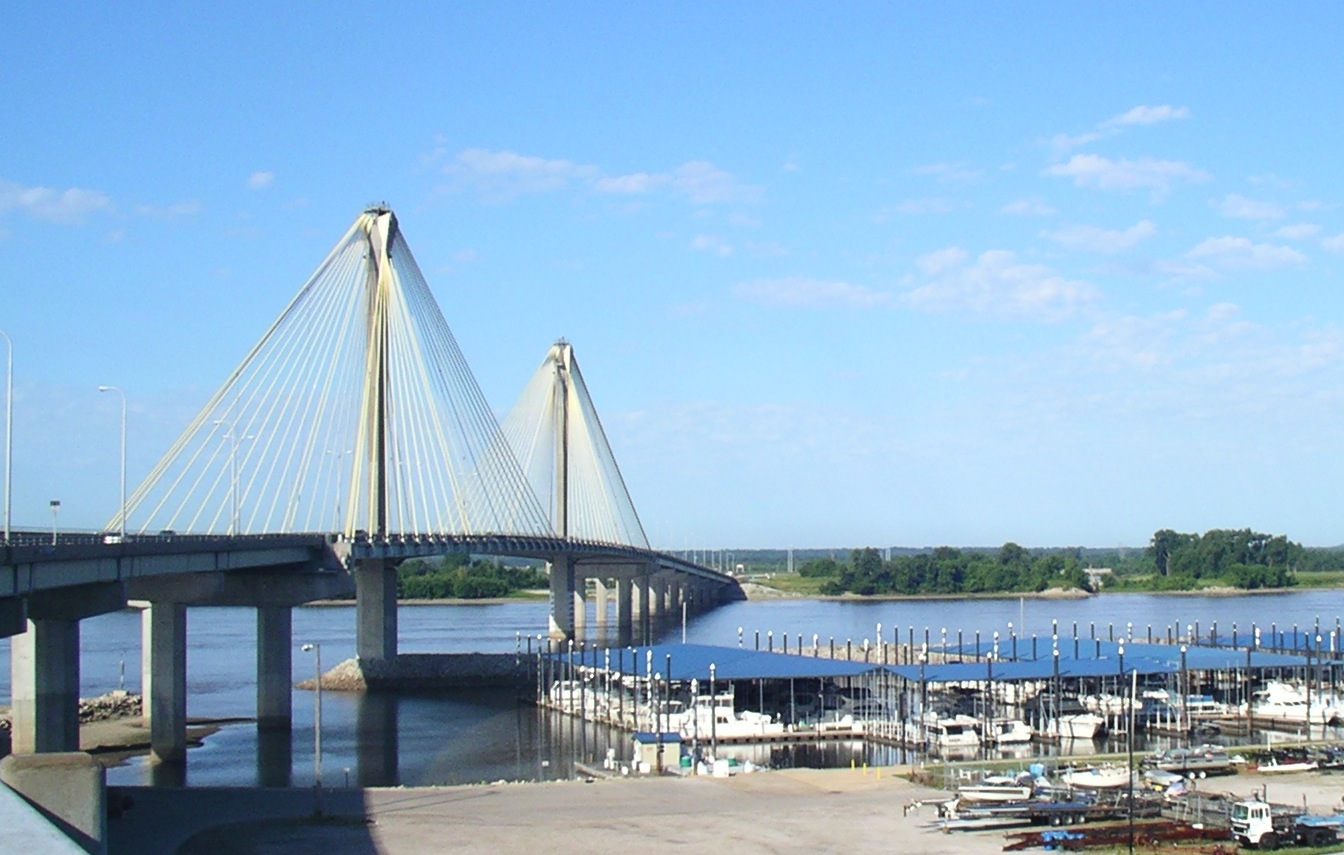
The Clark Bridge as seen from the Alton marina

Calls to replace the Clark Bridge at Alton began in the 1960s. The mayor of Alton spoke to the state highway study commission and asked them to pursue a new bridge as the old bridge created traffic bottlenecks in his city. The mayor also showed frustration in the lack of progress with the state, especially after an Illinois River bridge in Calhoun County was approved. At the time, the population of Calhoun County was lower than the daily number of vehicles using the Clark Bridge. The bridge was closed for extensive repairs during the latter half of 1975. Approximately 1,500 feet (460 m) of the bridge's deck was replaced. IDOT announced in November 1980 that engineering work would soon begin on the new bridge. A report in 1982 listed four locations, all of which were within 6,500 feet (2,000 m) of the original bridge, for consideration by the Illinois and Missouri departments of transportation. In April 1984, two semi trucks became wedged on the narrow bridge when they tried to pass by one another. Deteriorating steel floor beams led to an embargo on heavy truck traffic and a reduction of weight limits from 40 to 20 short tons (36 to 18 long tons; 36,000 to 18,000 kg) for semi trucks and 15 short tons (13 long tons; 14,000 kg) for dump trucks in late 1990.

Design work on the new bridge began in 1985. In November 1989, the federal government released $26.4 million of discretionary funds for the construction of a $92-million, four-lane replacement (equivalent to $56 million and $197 million, respectively, in 2023). By the end of 1991, the federal government had contributed $70 million to the project (equivalent to $140 million in 2023). Engineers from IDOT decided on a cable-stayed bridge to replace the old truss bridge; the first of its kind in Greater St. Louis. Construction on the piers began in 1991 and progressed without incident. The last piece of framing was installed on May 7, 1993. Crews anticipated that the bridge would open around December 1, 1993. The Great Flood of 1993 did not damage the bridge and construction was only delayed for two months when the U.S. Army Corps of Engineers closed the river to barge traffic. The new Clark Bridge opened on January 6, 1994.

=== Corridor 67 ===
Beginning in 1989, a group of citizens from the western Illinois counties that comprise Forgottonia organized a group to advocate expanding US 67 to become a limited-access highway from Alton to the Quad Cities. The Corridor 67 committee expected the cost of the project to be $700 million (equivalent to $1.5 billion in 2023) At the time, the state secretary of transportation noted it was unlikely there would be any funds for that highway in the upcoming five-year plan as federal highway dollars were already stretched. Illinois Secretary of State, and later governor, Jim Edgar expressed support for the Corridor 67 group's aspirations and hoped the route would be selected for the Avenue of the Saints highway. In order to sweeten their proposal to attract the Avenue of the Saints, IDOT officials offered to increase their share of construction costs from 20 to 30 percent.

Among politicians, the Avenue of the Saints project was popular. Both major political party candidates in the 1992 U.S. Senate election for Illinois supported funding the project. The Democratic Party candidate and eventual winner, Carol Moseley Braun, even received reassurance from Senator Daniel Patrick Moynihan of New York, who at the time was the chair of the senate committee that oversees federal highway funding. Ultimately, the Avenue of the Saints highway was not routed through Illinois, but leaders from the Corridor 67 group hoped there could be a second Saints route through the state. By 1994, Corridor 67 formed a political action committee, PAC 67, with the express intent of bringing attention to their project. The highway received some renewed interest during the 1998 election cycle. Gubernatorial candidate and eventual winner George Ryan suggested moving fuel taxes back into the transportation budget in order to fund the US 67 project.

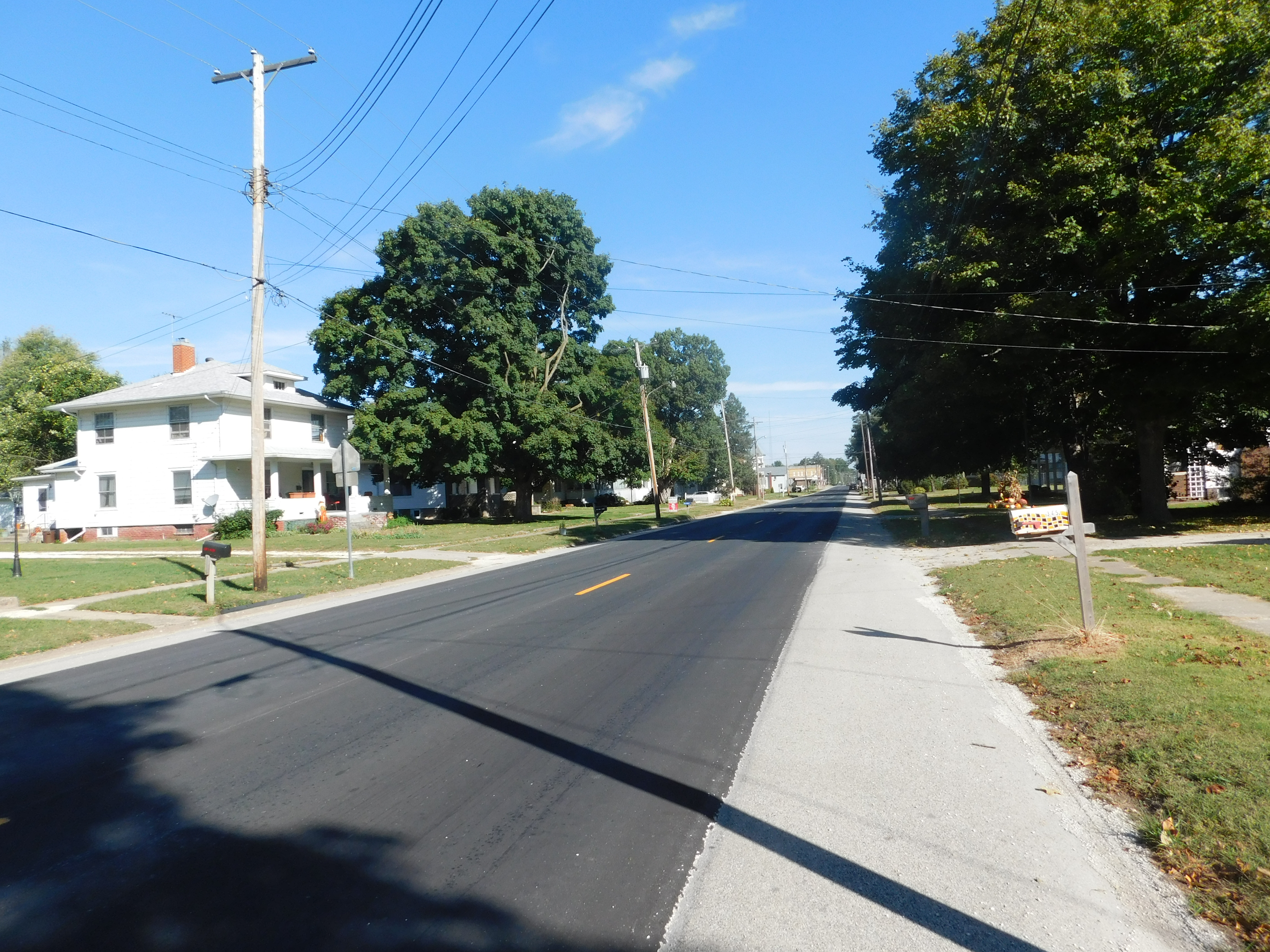
The former routing of US 67 through Roseville

Despite, in their opinion, there never seeming to be any available funds to widen US 67 to four lanes, members of the Corridor 67 group remained optimistic. Engineers chose their preferred alignment, along IL 267 from Alton to Jacksonville, and then along the present alignment of US 67 north to the Quad Cities. Some work was completed by the end of the 1990s: widening between Monmouth and Macomb and a western bypass of Jacksonville. On July 5, 2001, IDOT announced that crews would swap route markers on US 67 and IL 267 beginning July 9. The change was made to apply the US 67 designation to the entire Corridor 67 route before major projects began rather than after. The renumbering came to the surprise of residents and business owners along both routes who felt they were not given enough notice of the change. IDOT officials disagreed and said that due diligence was done.

Throughout the 2000s decade, US 67 was widened further. A bypass was built around Roseville, which completed the four-lane highway between Macomb and Monmouth. A new section from the former IL 267 highway near Murrayville connected to the western bypass of Jacksonville. While working south of Jerseyville in July 2010, remains of a 1400-year-old Native American village was discovered. Archeologists unearthed storage pits and floors made of flagstone. Artifact excavation was completed about a month later.

The Corridor 67 project is ongoing and is being completed as funds are available. In 2003, the FHWA and IDOT signed off on plans to widen US 67 between Jacksonville and Macomb. Those plans included a new $62-million crossing of the Illinois River at Beardstown (equivalent to $98 million in 2023) as well as the construction of interchanges at IL 104 near Meredosia, 6th Street in Beardstown, IL 100/IL 103 across the river from Beardstown, and US 24 at Rushville. Construction on the new bridge is scheduled to begin in 2023 and be completed in 2026.

== Major intersections ==
County	Location	mi	km	Exit	Destinations	Notes
Mississippi River		0.0	0.0		US 67 south – St. Louis	Continuation into Missouri
Mississippi River		0.0	0.0		Clark Bridge; Missouri–Illinois state line	
Madison	Alton	0.6	0.97		IL 143 east / Great River Road south / Meeting of the Great Rivers south to IL 140 – Wood River	Southern end of Great River Road and Meeting of the Great Rivers overlaps
Madison	Alton	1.4	2.3		IL 100 north (Broadway) / Great River Road north / Meeting of the Great Rivers north – Grafton, Pere Marquette State Park	Northern end of Great River Road and Meeting of the Great Rivers overlaps
Madison	Godfrey	5.0	8.0		IL 111 south to IL 3 – Alton, Bethalto	Southern end of IL 111 overlap
Madison	Godfrey	7.4	11.9		IL 111 north / IL 267 north (Lars Hoffmann Crossing) to IL 255 – Brighton	Northern end of IL 111 overlap
Madison	Godfrey	7.9	12.7	—	IL 255 south to I-270	Southbound exit and northbound entrance only
Jersey	Jerseyville	20.0	32.2		IL 109 south – Grafton	
Jersey	Jerseyville	20.2	32.5		IL 16 (Carpenter Street)	
Greene	Carrollton	34.0	54.7		IL 108 (Main Street)	
Greene	White Hall	44.0	70.8		IL 106 north – Winchester	
Scott	No major junctions					
Morgan	Murrayville Precinct				Murrayville Road – Murrayville	Former IL 267
Morgan	Lynnville Precinct	62.4	100.4	—	I-72 / US 36 – Springfield, Quincy I-72 BL begins	Southern end of I-72 BL overlap
Morgan	Jacksonville	65.1	104.8	—	I-72 BL east (Morton Avenue)	Northern end of I-72 BL overlap
Morgan	Jacksonville	67.1	108.0	—	IL 104 east to IL 78 north – Jacksonville	Southern end of IL 104 overlap
Morgan	Chapin Precinct	71.5	115.1	—	Concord, Arenzville (CR 7)	
Morgan	Meredosia Precinct	79.8	128.4		IL 100 south / Illinois River Road south – Bluffs	Southern end of IL 100 and Illinois River Road overlaps
Morgan	Meredosia Precinct	80.7	129.9		IL 104 west – Meredosia, Quincy	Northern end of IL 104 overlap; future interchange
Cass	Beardstown	94.1	151.4		IL 125 east – Virginia	
Cass	Beardstown				6th Street	Future interchange
Illinois River		95.0	152.9		Beardstown Bridge	
Schuyler	Bainbridge Township	96.1	154.7		IL 100 north / Illinois River Road north – Havana IL 103 west – Mount Sterling	Northern end of IL 100 and Illinois River Road overlaps; future interchange
Schuyler	Rushville	105.0	169.0		US 24 (Clinton Street) – Rushville, Mount Sterling	Future interchange
Schuyler	Littleton Township	113.3	182.3		IL 101 west – Littleton, Augusta	
McDonough	Scotland Township	129.4	208.2		US 136 east – Adair	Southern end of US 136 overlap
McDonough	Macomb	132.4	213.1		US 136 west – Carthage	Northern end of US 136 overlap
McDonough	Emmet–Macomb township line				IL 110 (CKC) west / IL 336 south – Carthage	Southern end of IL 110 (CKC) overlap
McDonough	Good Hope	138.6	223.1		IL 9 – Bushnell, LaHarpe	
Warren	Point Pleasant–Swan township line	149.9	241.2		US 67 Bus. north – Roseville	
Warren	Ellison Township	151.4	243.7		IL 116 – Roseville, Media	
Warren	Roseville Township	153.8	247.5		US 67 Bus. south – Roseville	
Warren	Lenox–Monmouth township line	162.8	262.0		US 34 east / S. Main Street – Burlington	Southern end of US 34 overlap
Warren	Monmouth	164.3	264.4		IL 164 west (Broadway) – Oquawka	Southern end of IL 164 overlap
Warren	Monmouth	165.8	266.8		US 34 east / IL 110 (CKC) east / IL 164 east – Galesburg	Northern end of US 34, IL 110 (CKC), and IL 164 overlaps
Warren–Mercer county line	Spring Grove–Suez township line	175.8	282.9		IL 135 west – Little York	Southern end of IL 135 overlap
Warren–Mercer county line	Spring Grove–Suez township line	177.5	285.7		IL 135 east – Alexis	Northern end of IL 135 overlap
Mercer	Viola	187.0	300.9		IL 17 – New Windsor, Aledo	
Rock Island	Bowling Township	200.3	322.4		IL 94 west to IL 192 – Taylor Ridge, Muscatine, Iowa	
Rock Island	Milan				Milan Beltway (CR 78) / 92nd Ave W.	
Rock Island	Milan	204.6	329.3		Airport Road to I-280 – Quad City Airport	
Rock Island	Rock Island	206.0	331.5		IL 5 east (46th Avenue) – Black Hawk State Historic Site	
Rock Island	Rock Island				11th Street to IL 92	
Rock Island	Rock Island	213.8	344.1	—	To IL 92 (Centennial Expressway) / 2nd Avenue	Southbound exit and northbound entrance only
Mississippi River		214.0	344.4	Rock Island Centennial Bridge; Illinois–Iowa state line		
Mississippi River		214.0	344.4		US 67 north – Davenport	Continuation into Iowa
1.000 mi = 1.609 km; 1.000 km = 0.621 mi: Concurrency terminus; Incomplete access; Unopened

== Related routes ==
- U.S. Route 67 Business (Roseville, Illinois)
- U.S. Route 67 Alternate (St. Louis, Missouri–Alton, Illinois)
- U.S. Route 67 Alternate (Godfrey–Murrayville, Illinois)

U.S. Route 67
Previous state: Missouri	Illinois	Next state: Iowa
