= Illinois Route 135 =

State highway in Warren and Mercer Counties, Illinois, US

Illinois Route 135
- IL 135 highlighted in red

Route information
- Maintained by IDOT
- Length: 20.31 mi (32.69 km)
- Existed: March 1937–present

Major junctions
- CCW end: IL 164 in Kirkwood
- US 67 in Alexis
- CW end: Main Street in Alexis

Location
- Country: United States
- State: Illinois
- Counties: Warren, Mercer

Highway system
- Illinois State Highway System; Interstate; US; State; Tollways; Scenic
← IL 134	→ US 136

Illinois Route 135 (IL 135) is a 20.31-mile (32.69 km), L-shaped state road in Warren County, Illinois, United States, that runs from IL 164 west of Monmouth to Main Street in Alexis, at the base of the town's water tower.

== Route description ==
IL 135 is an undivided two-lane surface road for its entire length. It runs concurrently with IL 94 for a few miles north of Little York, and with U.S. Route 67 (US 67) for a few miles west of Alexis. IL 135 is signed in all four directions and changes directions at the turnoff from IL 94.

== History ==
SBI Route 135 originally ran from IL 1 to State Road 154 (SR 154) near Hutsonville via a bridge over the Wabash River. This was removed in 1935; the bridge is now unnumbered. In 1937 it was applied on what was IL 94B, the current routing.

== Major intersections ==
County	Location	mi	km	Destinations	Notes
Warren		0.00	0.00	IL 164 – Monmouth, Oquawka	Southern terminus; road continues south as 20th Street
Warren		7.6	12.2	IL 94 south – Biggsville	Southern end of IL 94 concurrency
Warren–Mercer county line		10.6	17.1	IL 94 north – Aledo	Northern end of IL 94 concurrency
Warren–Mercer county line		16.8	27.0	US 67 south – Monmouth	Western end of US 67 concurrency
Mercer		18.6	29.9	US 67 north – Viola	Eastern end of US 67 concurrency
Mercer–Warren county line	Alexis	20.31	32.69	Main Street	Northern terminus; road continues east as Hunt Avenue
1.000 mi = 1.609 km; 1.000 km = 0.621 mi: Concurrency terminus
