= Youngstown, Illinois =

- Unincorporated community
- Location within Illinois Location within the United States
- Coordinates: 40°39′38″N 90°37′02″W
- Country: United States
- State: Illinois
- County: Warren
- Elevation: 758 ft (231 m)
- Time zone: UTC-6 (Central (CST))
  - Summer (DST): UTC-5 (CDT)
- Area code: 309
- GNIS feature ID: 421606

Youngstown is an unincorporated community in Warren County, Illinois, United States. Youngstown is 5.5 miles (8.9 km) south-southeast of Roseville.
