= Kelly Township =

Kelly Township may refer to the following townships in the United States:

- Kelly Township, Union County, Pennsylvania
- Kelly Township, Cooper County, Missouri
- Kelly Township, Warren County, Illinois
