= Smithshire, Illinois =

- Unincorporated community
- Location within Illinois Location within the United States
- Coordinates: 40°47′34″N 90°46′47″W
- Country: United States
- State: Illinois
- County: Warren
- Elevation: 735 ft (224 m)
- Time zone: UTC-6 (Central (CST))
  - Summer (DST): UTC-5 (CDT)
- ZIP code: 61478
- Area code: 309
- GNIS feature ID: 418654

Smithshire is an unincorporated community in Warren County, Illinois, United States. Smithshire is located along the BNSF Railway line, 40 miles (64 km) northeast of Fort Madison, Iowa. Smithshire is 30 miles (48 km) southwest of Galesburg. Smithshire has a post office with ZIP code 61478.

== History ==
Smithshire came into being with the building of the Atchison, Topeka and Santa Fe Railway line through the area in 1888. It is the only population center in Ellison Township. The abandoned town of Ellison was two miles (3 km) from Smithshire. Ellison began in the 1830s, but suffered from a catastrophic tornado in 1858, damping its growth. The remaining community moved to Smithshire with the coming of the railroad.

Smithshire is the location of the corporate offices of Twomey Company Twomey Company. Twomey Company was a family owned agribusiness corporation, beginning in 1945. Consolidated Grain and Barge purchased the Twomey Company in 2012. Twomey Co had storage capacity for 51 million bushels when it was sold. Twomey Company operated in several western Illinois locations, including a barge loading facility on the Mississippi River.

Smithshire has a population of approximately 100. Smithshire has one church, the Smithshire United Methodist Church United Methodist Church. Smithshire is a part of the West Central High School, district 235.

== Transportation ==
Amtrak’s Southwest Chief, which operates between Los Angeles and Chicago, passes through the town on BNSF tracks, but makes no stop. The nearest station is located in Galesburg, 31 miles (50 km) to the northeast.
