= Ormonde, Illinois =

- Unincorporated community
- Location within Illinois Location within the United States
- Coordinates: 40°51′18″N 90°36′47″W
- Country: United States
- State: Illinois
- County: Warren
- Elevation: 771 ft (235 m)
- Time zone: UTC-6 (Central (CST))
  - Summer (DST): UTC-5 (CDT)
- Area code: 309
- GNIS feature ID: 415182

Ormonde is an unincorporated community in Warren County, Illinois, United States. Ormonde is 4.5 miles (7.2 km) south-southeast of Monmouth.

== Transportation ==
While there is no fixed-route transit service in Ormonde, intercity bus service is provided by Burlington Trailways in nearby Monmouth.

Amtrak’s Southwest Chief, which operates between Los Angeles and Chicago, passes through the town on BNSF tracks, but makes no stop. The nearest station is located in Galesburg, 19 miles (31 km) to the northeast.
