= Larchland, Illinois =

- Unincorporated community
- Location within Illinois Location within the United States
- Coordinates: 40°49′12″N 90°39′10″W
- Country: United States
- State: Illinois
- County: Warren
- Elevation: 732 ft (223 m)
- Time zone: UTC-6 (Central (CST))
  - Summer (DST): UTC-5 (CDT)
- Area code: 309
- GNIS feature ID: 411831

Larchland is an unincorporated community in Warren County, Illinois, United States. Larchland is located along U.S. Route 67, 6.5 miles (10.5 km) south of Monmouth.

== Transportation ==
While there is no fixed-route transit service in Larchland, intercity bus service is provided by Burlington Trailways in nearby Monmouth.
