= Eleanor, Illinois =

- Unincorporated community
- Location within Illinois Location within the United States
- Coordinates: 40°58′58″N 90°41′42″W
- Country: United States
- State: Illinois
- County: Warren
- Elevation: 686 ft (209 m)
- Time zone: UTC-6 (Central (CST))
  - Summer (DST): UTC-5 (CDT)
- Area code: 309
- GNIS feature ID: 407855

Eleanor is an unincorporated community in Warren County, Illinois, United States. Eleanor is 5.5 miles (8.9 km) north-northwest of Monmouth.

== Transportation ==
While there is no fixed-route transit service in Eleanor, intercity bus service is provided by Burlington Trailways in nearby Monmouth.
