= Ponemah =

Ponemah may refer to:

- Ponemah, Illinois
- Ponemah, Minnesota
- Ponemah, a complete physiologic data acquisition and analysis software platform used by physiologists, from Data Sciences International
- Ponemah Bog, a wildlife refuge in Amherst, New Hampshire
