= Greenbush, Illinois =

- Unincorporated community
- Location within Illinois Location within the United States
- Coordinates: 40°42′43″N 90°32′07″W
- Country: United States
- State: Illinois
- County: Warren
- Elevation: 686 ft (209 m)
- Time zone: UTC-6 (Central (CST))
  - Summer (DST): UTC-5 (CDT)
- Area code: 309
- GNIS feature ID: 409419

Greenbush is an unincorporated community in Warren County, Illinois, United States. Greenbush is 7 miles (11 km) east-southeast of Roseville.
