= Coldbrook =

Coldbrook may refer to:

- Coldbrook, Nova Scotia, a Canadian suburban community
- Coldbrook, Illinois, also known as Cold Brook, an unincorporated community in Illinois
- Coldbrook Park, Llanover, Monmouthshire, Wales
