= Good Hope, Illinois =

- Village
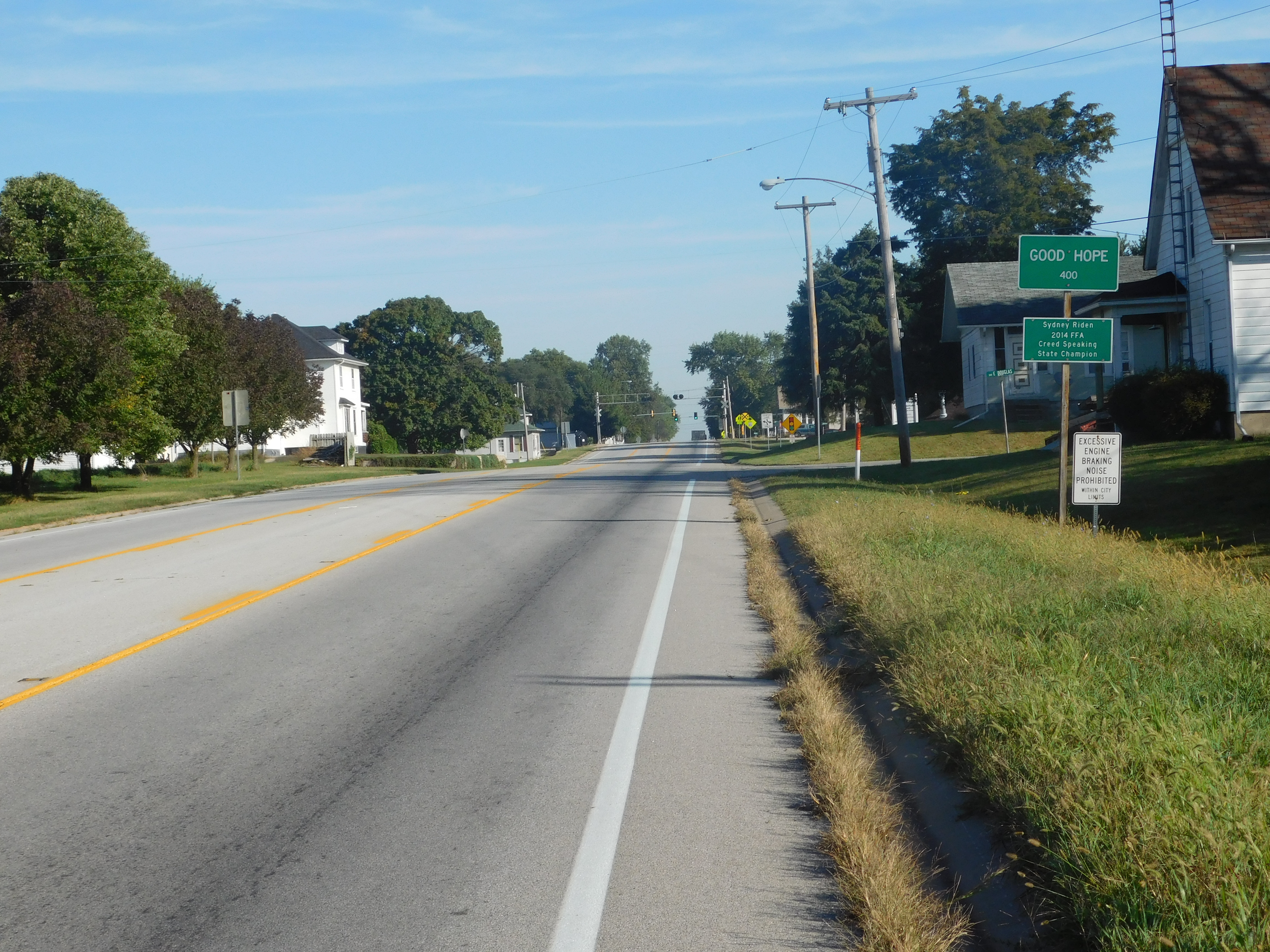
- US 67 northbound entering Good Hope

- Location in McDonough County, Illinois
- Coordinates: 40°33′27″N 90°40′31″W
- Country: United States
- State: Illinois
- County: McDonough
- Townships: Sciota, Walnut Grove

Area
  - Total: 0.30 sq mi (0.78 km^{2})
  - Land: 0.30 sq mi (0.78 km^{2})
  - Water: 0 sq mi (0.00 km^{2})
- Elevation: 712 ft (217 m)

Population (2020)
  - Total: 363
  - Density: 1,209/sq mi (466.9/km^{2})
- Time zone: UTC-6 (CST)
  - Summer (DST): UTC-5 (CDT)
- ZIP code: 61438
- Area code: 309
- FIPS code: 17-30458
- GNIS feature ID: 2398175

Good Hope is a village in McDonough County, Illinois, United States. Its population was 363 at the 2020 census.

== History ==
Early in its history the town was also at times spelled "Goodhope". It was settled by 1840.

== Geography ==
Good Hope is located in northern McDonough County. U.S. Route 67 passes through the village as Monmouth Street, leading south 7 miles (11 km) to Macomb, the county seat, and north 12 miles (19 km) to Roseville.

According to the U.S. Census Bureau, Good Hope has a total area of 0.30 square miles (0.78 km^{2}), all land. The village is drained to the south by tributaries of Town Fork, an east-flowing tributary of Farm Fork, the La Moine River, and eventually the Illinois River.

== Demographics ==
Historical population
Census	Pop.	Note	%±
1880	325		—
1890	368		13.2%
1900	430		16.8%
1910	361		−16.0%
1920	353		−2.2%
1930	369		4.5%
1940	366		−0.8%
1950	392		7.1%
1960	394		0.5%
1970	477		21.1%
1980	457		−4.2%
1990	416		−9.0%
2000	415		−0.2%
2010	396		−4.6%
2020	363		−8.3%
U.S. Decennial Census

As of the census of 2000, there were 415 people, 175 households, and 120 families residing in the village. The population density was 1,408.0 inhabitants per square mile (543.6/km^{2}). There were 181 housing units at an average density of 614.1 per square mile (237.1/km^{2}). The racial makeup of the village was 99.28% White, 0.24% Native American, 0.24% from other races, and 0.24% from two or more races. Hispanic or Latino of any race were 0.48% of the population.

There were 175 households, out of which 27.4% had children under the age of 18 living with them, 61.7% were married couples living together, 5.1% had a female householder with no husband present, and 30.9% were non-families. 28.0% of all households were made up of individuals, and 10.3% had someone living alone who was 65 years of age or older. The average household size was 2.37 and the average family size was 2.93.

In the village, the population was spread out, with 26.0% under the age of 18, 5.3% from 18 to 24, 28.7% from 25 to 44, 23.4% from 45 to 64, and 16.6% who were 65 years of age or older. The median age was 39 years. For every 100 females, there were 101.5 males. For every 100 females age 18 and over, there were 99.4 males.

The median income for a household in the village was $37,386, and the median income for a family was $41,964. Males had a median income of $31,250 versus $21,000 for females. The per capita income for the village was $14,555. About 7.2% of families and 9.8% of the population were below the poverty line, including 10.2% of those under age 18 and 7.7% of those age 65 or over.

== Education ==
Good Hope is part of the West Prairie Community Unit School District 103. Students attend elementary school at North Elementary located in Good Hope and Middle School in Colchester. Students then go on to attend West Prairie High School in Colchester.
