= Shanghai City, Illinois =

- Unincorporated community
- Location within Illinois Location within the United States
- Coordinates: 41°03′03″N 90°29′48″W
- Country: United States
- State: Illinois
- County: Warren
- Elevation: 725 ft (221 m)
- Time zone: UTC-6 (Central (CST))
  - Summer (DST): UTC-5 (CDT)
- Area code: 309
- GNIS feature ID: 421689

Shanghai City is an unincorporated community in Warren County, Illinois, United States. Shanghai City is 3 miles (4.8 km) east-southeast of Alexis.

The community was originally named Ionia. Its present name comes from the Shanghai rooster, an aggressive rooster once commonly used in cockfighting. At its peak in the 1850s, Shanghai City had roughly 250 residents and several businesses, including a wagon factory. Its population steadily declined in the twentieth century, and after a 1968 tornado it was reduced to six homes and a school building.
