= Cold Brook Township, Warren County, Illinois =

Cold Brook Township
- Township
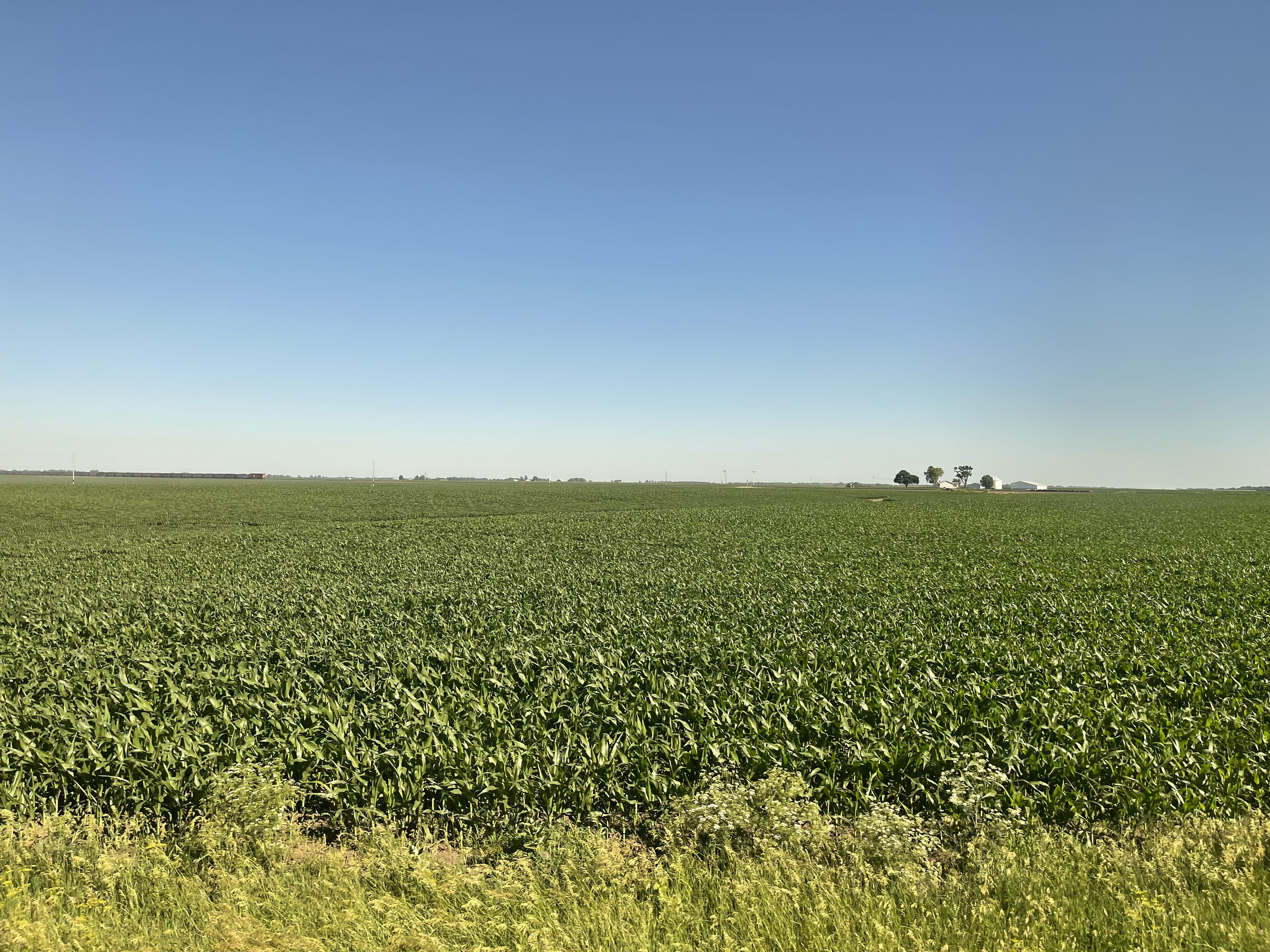
- A corn field in Cold Brook Township seen from the California Zephyr in 2022.

- Location in Warren County
- Coordinates: 40°55′58″N 90°29′51″W
- Country: United States
- State: Illinois
- County: Warren
- Established: November 8, 1853

Area
  - Total: 35.64 sq mi (92.3 km^{2})
  - Land: 35.64 sq mi (92.3 km^{2})
  - Water: 0 sq mi (0 km^{2}) 0%
- Elevation: 761 ft (232 m)

Population (2010)
  - Estimate (2016): 465
  - Density: 13.1/sq mi (5.1/km^{2})
- Time zone: UTC-6 (CST)
  - Summer (DST): UTC-5 (CDT)
- FIPS code: 17-187-15404

Cold Brook Township is located in Warren County, Illinois, United States. As of the 2010 census, its population was 467 and it contained 196 housing units.

== Geography ==
According to the 2010 census, the township has a total area of 35.64 square miles (92.3 km^{2}), all land.

== Demographics ==
Historical population
Census	Pop.	Note	%±
2016 (est.)	465
U.S. Decennial Census
