= Ponemah, Illinois =

- Unincorporated community
- Location within Illinois Location within the United States
- Coordinates: 40°49′14″N 90°42′20″W
- Country: United States
- State: Illinois
- County: Warren
- Elevation: 722 ft (220 m)
- Time zone: UTC-6 (Central (CST))
  - Summer (DST): UTC-5 (CDT)
- Area code: 309
- GNIS feature ID: 416006

Ponemah is an unincorporated community in Warren County, Illinois, United States. Ponemah is 4 miles (6.4 km) southeast of Kirkwood.

== Transportation ==
While there is no fixed-route transit service in Ponemah, intercity bus service is provided by Burlington Trailways in nearby Monmouth.
