= Hale Township, Warren County, Illinois =

Coordinates: 40°56′22″N 90°43′48″W

Hale Township
- Township
- Location in Warren County
- Country: United States
- State: Illinois
- County: Warren
- Established: November 8, 1853

Area
  - Total: 36.54 sq mi (94.6 km^{2})
  - Land: 36.53 sq mi (94.6 km^{2})
  - Water: 0 sq mi (0 km^{2}) 0%

Population (2010)
  - Estimate (2016): 341
  - Density: 9.4/sq mi (3.6/km^{2})
- Time zone: UTC-6 (CST)
  - Summer (DST): UTC-5 (CDT)
- FIPS code: 17-187-32226

Hale Township is located in Warren County, Illinois, United States. As of the 2010 census, its population was 344 and it contained 136 housing units.

== Geography ==
According to the 2010 census, the township has a total area of 36.54 square miles (94.6 km^{2}), all land.

== Demographics ==
Historical population
| Census | Pop. | Note | %± |
|---|---|---|---|
| 2016 (est.) | 341 |
U.S. Decennial Census
