= Sumner Township, Warren County, Illinois =

Coordinates: 41°01′26″N 90°43′34″W

Sumner Township
- Township
- Location in Warren County
- Country: United States
- State: Illinois
- County: Warren
- Established: November 8, 1853

Area
  - Total: 37.07 sq mi (96.0 km^{2})
  - Land: 37.07 sq mi (96.0 km^{2})
  - Water: 0 sq mi (0 km^{2}) 0%

Population (2010)
  - Estimate (2016): 567
  - Density: 15.4/sq mi (5.9/km^{2})
- Time zone: UTC-6 (CST)
  - Summer (DST): UTC-5 (CDT)
- FIPS code: 17-187-73716

Sumner Township is located in Warren County, Illinois, United States. The village of Little York is located in this township.

== Geography ==
According to the 2010 census, the township has a total area of 37.07 square miles (96.0 km^{2}), all land.

== Demographics ==
As of the 2010 census, its population was 572 and it contained 262 housing units.

Historical population
Census	Pop.	Note	%±
2016 (est.)	567
U.S. Decennial Census
