= Utah, Illinois =

- Unincorporated community
- Location within Illinois Location within the United States
- Coordinates: 40°59′03″N 90°29′16″W
- Country: United States
- State: Illinois
- County: Warren
- Elevation: 738 ft (225 m)
- Time zone: UTC-6 (Central (CST))
  - Summer (DST): UTC-5 (CDT)
- Area code: 309
- GNIS feature ID: 423270

Utah is an unincorporated community in Warren County, in the U.S. state of Illinois.

== History ==
A post office called Utah was established in 1850, and remained in operation until 1906. The community was named after the Utah Territory.
