= Floyd Township, Warren County, Illinois =

Coordinates: 40°50′43″N 90°29′59″W

Floyd Township
- Township
- Location in Warren County
- Country: United States
- State: Illinois
- County: Warren
- Established: November 8, 1853

Area
  - Total: 35.72 sq mi (92.5 km^{2})
  - Land: 35.72 sq mi (92.5 km^{2})
  - Water: 0 sq mi (0 km^{2}) 0%

Population (2010)
  - Estimate (2016): 470
  - Density: 13.2/sq mi (5.1/km^{2})
- Time zone: UTC-6 (CST)
  - Summer (DST): UTC-5 (CDT)
- FIPS code: 17-187-26610

Floyd Township is located in Warren County, Illinois, United States. As of the 2010 census, its population was 472 and it contained 207 housing units.

== Geography ==
According to the 2010 census, the township has a total area of 35.72 square miles (92.5 km^{2}), all land.

== Demographics ==
Historical population
| Census | Pop. | Note | %± |
|---|---|---|---|
| 2016 (est.) | 470 |
U.S. Decennial Census
