= Warren County Courthouse (Illinois) =

Coordinates: 40°54′45″N 90°38′57″W

The Warren County Courthouse is the governmental center and courthouse of Warren County, Illinois. Its court sessions hear cases in the 9th circuit of Illinois judicial district 4. The county courthouse is located at 100 West Broadway in the county seat of Monmouth.

== History ==
The current Warren County structure, built in 1894-1895, is the fourth courthouse to serve the county. Earlier courthouses were raised in Monmouth in 1831, 1835, and 1836-1841. The spurt of courthouse construction in the 1830s is associated with county-seat competition between Monmouth and the Mississippi River port town of Oquawka. In 1841 Oquawka got is own county, Henderson County, and ceased to compete with Monmouth.

The fourth or current courthouse was built in the Romanesque Revival style, with a cladding of rusticated sandstone. The cost of construction was $130,000.
