= Swan Creek, Illinois =

- Unincorporated community
- Location within Illinois Location within the United States
- Coordinates: 40°40′04″N 90°39′17″W
- Country: United States
- State: Illinois
- County: Warren
- Elevation: 764 ft (233 m)
- Time zone: UTC-6 (Central (CST))
  - Summer (DST): UTC-5 (CDT)
- Area code: 309
- GNIS feature ID: 419451

Swan Creek is an unincorporated community in Warren County, Illinois, United States. Swan Creek is 4.5 miles (7.2 km) south of Roseville.
