= Gerlaw, Illinois =

- Unincorporated community
- Location within Illinois Location within the United States
- Coordinates: 40°59′13″N 90°36′06″W
- Country: United States
- State: Illinois
- County: Warren
- Elevation: 735 ft (224 m)
- Time zone: UTC-6 (Central (CST))
  - Summer (DST): UTC-5 (CDT)
- ZIP code: 61435
- Area code: 309
- GNIS feature ID: 408963

Gerlaw is an unincorporated community in Warren County, Illinois, United States. Gerlaw is 6 miles (9.7 km) north-northeast of Monmouth.

Gerlaw had a post office, which closed on August 28, 2010.
