= Greenbush Township, Warren County, Illinois =

Coordinates: 40°40′34″N 90°30′42″W

Greenbush Township
- Township
- Location in Warren County
- Country: United States
- State: Illinois
- County: Warren
- Established: November 8, 1853

Area
  - Total: 35.81 sq mi (92.7 km^{2})
  - Land: 35.45 sq mi (91.8 km^{2})
  - Water: 0.36 sq mi (0.93 km^{2}) 1.01%

Population (2010)
  - Estimate (2016): 530
  - Density: 15/sq mi (5.8/km^{2})
- Time zone: UTC-6 (CST)
  - Summer (DST): UTC-5 (CDT)
- FIPS code: 17-187-31277

Greenbush Township is located in Warren County, Illinois. As of the 2010 census, its population was 533 and it contained 286 housing units.

== Geography ==
According to the 2010 census, the township has a total area of 35.81 square miles (92.7 km^{2}), of which 35.45 square miles (91.8 km^{2}) (or 98.99%) is land and 0.36 square miles (0.93 km^{2}) (or 1.01%) is water.

== Demographics ==
Historical population
Census	Pop.	Note	%±
2016 (est.)	530
U.S. Decennial Census
