= Berwick Township, Warren County, Illinois =

Coordinates: 40°46′08″N 90°29′30″W

Berwick Township
- Township
- Location in Warren County
- Country: United States
- State: Illinois
- County: Warren
- Established: November 8, 1853

Area
  - Total: 35.88 sq mi (92.9 km^{2})
  - Land: 36 sq mi (93 km^{2})
  - Water: 0 sq mi (0 km^{2}) 0%

Population (2010)
  - Estimate (2016): 324
  - Density: 9.1/sq mi (3.5/km^{2})
- Time zone: UTC-6 (CST)
  - Summer (DST): UTC-5 (CDT)
- FIPS code: 17-187-05560
- Website: www.berwicktownship.org

Berwick Township is located in Warren County, Illinois, United States. As of the 2010 census, its population was 327 and it contained 163 housing units.

== Geography ==
According to the 2010 census, the township has a total area of 35.88 square miles (92.9 km^{2}), all land.

== Demographics ==
Historical population
Census	Pop.	Note	%±
2016 (est.)	324
U.S. Decennial Census
