= Little York, Illinois =

Little York
- Village
- Location of Little York in Warren County, Illinois.

- Location of Illinois in the United States
- Coordinates: 41°00′39″N 90°44′50″W
- Country: United States
- State: Illinois
- County: Warren
- Township: Sumner

Area
  - Total: 0.22 sq mi (0.58 km^{2})
  - Land: 0.22 sq mi (0.58 km^{2})
- Elevation: 617 ft (188 m)

Population (2020)
  - Total: 283
  - Density: 1,268.1/sq mi (489.62/km^{2})
- Time zone: UTC-6 (CST)
  - Summer (DST): UTC-5 (CDT)
- ZIP Code(s): 61453
- Area code: 309
- FIPS code: 17-44082
- GNIS feature ID: 2398454
- Wikimedia Commons: Little York, Illinois

Little York is a village in Warren County, Illinois, United States. As of the 2020 census, Little York had a population of 283. It is part of the Galesburg Micropolitan Statistical Area.

== History ==
The area was first settled in 1829 along what was once known as the "Monmouth, Aledo and Muscatine Stagecoach line." A section of the MAM Trail between Little York and Monmouth still exists today as part of IL-13.

Little York was incorporated as a village on May 11, 1894.

== Geography ==
According to the 2010 census, Little York has a total area of 0.26 square miles (0.67 km^{2}), all land.

== Demographics ==
Historical population
Census	Pop.	Note	%±
1880	79		—
1900	334		—
1910	358		7.2%
1920	355		−0.8%
1930	314		−11.5%
1940	318		1.3%
1950	324		1.9%
1960	329		1.5%
1970	297		−9.7%
1980	347		16.8%
1990	349		0.6%
2000	269		−22.9%
2010	331		23.0%
2020	283		−14.5%
U.S. Decennial Census

As of the census of 2000, there were 269 people, 109 households, and 74 families residing in the village. The population density was 1,043.3 inhabitants per square mile (402.8/km^{2}). There were 114 housing units at an average density of 442.2 per square mile (170.7/km^{2}). The racial makeup of the village was 99.63% White and 0.37% Native American. Hispanic or Latino of any race were 1.49% of the population.

There were 109 households, out of which 33.9% had children under the age of 18 living with them, 53.2% were married couples living together, 10.1% had a female householder with no husband present, and 31.2% were non-families. 29.4% of all households were made up of individuals, and 22.0% had someone living alone who was 65 years of age or older. The average household size was 2.47 and the average family size was 3.00.

In the village, the population was spread out, with 26.4% under the age of 18, 8.2% from 18 to 24, 28.6% from 25 to 44, 19.3% from 45 to 64, and 17.5% who were 65 years of age or older. The median age was 39 years. For every 100 females, there were 102.3 males. For every 100 females age 18 and over, there were 90.4 males.

The median income for a household in the village was $29,688, and the median income for a family was $39,375. Males had a median income of $32,188 versus $21,250 for females. The per capita income for the village was $15,121. About 12.5% of families and 14.8% of the population were below the poverty line, including 9.1% of those under the age of eighteen and 26.1% of those 65 or over.

== Transportation ==
While there is no fixed-route transit service in Little York, intercity bus service is provided by Burlington Trailways in nearby Monmouth.
