= Monmouth Township, Warren County, Illinois =

Coordinates: 40°55′59″N 90°36′27″W

Monmouth Township
- Township
- Location in Warren County
- Country: United States
- State: Illinois
- County: Warren
- Established: November 8, 1853

Area
  - Total: 36.97 sq mi (95.8 km^{2})
  - Land: 36.86 sq mi (95.5 km^{2})
  - Water: 0.12 sq mi (0.31 km^{2}) 0.32%

Population (2010)
  - Estimate (2016): 10,222
  - Density: 283.9/sq mi (109.6/km^{2})
- Time zone: UTC-6 (CST)
  - Summer (DST): UTC-5 (CDT)
- FIPS code: 17-187-50023

Monmouth Township is located in Warren County, Illinois, United States. As of the 2010 census, its population was 10,463 and it contained 4,237 housing units.

The township's name commemorates the Battle of Monmouth.

== Geography ==
According to the 2010 census, the township has a total area of 36.97 square miles (95.8 km^{2}), of which 36.86 square miles (95.5 km^{2}) (or 99.70%) is land and 0.12 square miles (0.31 km^{2}) (or 0.32%) is water.

The city of Monmouth is located in this township.

== Demographics ==
Historical population
Census	Pop.	Note	%±
2016 (est.)	10,222
U.S. Decennial Census
