= Lenox Township, Warren County, Illinois =

Coordinates: 40°51′12″N 90°36′53″W

Lenox Township
- Township
- Location in Warren County
- Country: United States
- State: Illinois
- County: Warren
- Established: November 8, 1853

Area
  - Total: 36.4 sq mi (94 km^{2})
  - Land: 36.4 sq mi (94 km^{2})
  - Water: 0 sq mi (0 km^{2}) 0%

Population (2010)
  - Estimate (2016): 277
  - Density: 7.7/sq mi (3.0/km^{2})
- Time zone: UTC-6 (CST)
  - Summer (DST): UTC-5 (CDT)
- FIPS code: 17-187-42847

Lenox Township is located in Warren County, Illinois, United States. As of the 2010 census, its population was 280 and it contained 124 housing units.

== Geography ==
According to the 2010 census, the township has a total area of 36.4 square miles (94 km^{2}), all land.

== Demographics ==
Historical population
Census	Pop.	Note	%±
2016 (est.)	277
U.S. Decennial Census
