= Kelly Township, Warren County, Illinois =

Coordinates: 41°01′03″N 90°30′07″W

Kelly Township
- Township
- Location in Warren County
- Country: United States
- State: Illinois
- County: Warren
- Established: November 8, 1853

Area
  - Total: 35.18 sq mi (91.1 km^{2})
  - Land: 35.14 sq mi (91.0 km^{2})
  - Water: 0.04 sq mi (0.10 km^{2}) 0.11%

Population (2010)
  - Estimate (2016): 343
  - Density: 9.8/sq mi (3.8/km^{2})
- Time zone: UTC-6 (CST)
  - Summer (DST): UTC-5 (CDT)
- FIPS code: 17-187-39396

Kelly Township is in Warren County, Illinois, United States. As of the 2010 census, its population was 346 and it contained 159 housing units.

A small portion of the village of Alexis is in this township.

== Geography ==
According to the 2010 census, the township has a total area of 35.18 square miles (91.1 km^{2}), of which 35.14 square miles (91.0 km^{2}) (or 99.89%) is land and 0.04 square miles (0.10 km^{2}) (or 0.11%) is water.

== Demographics ==
Historical population
| Census | Pop. | Note | %± |
|---|---|---|---|
| 2016 (est.) | 343 |
U.S. Decennial Census
