= Warren County, Illinois =

County in Illinois, United States

- County
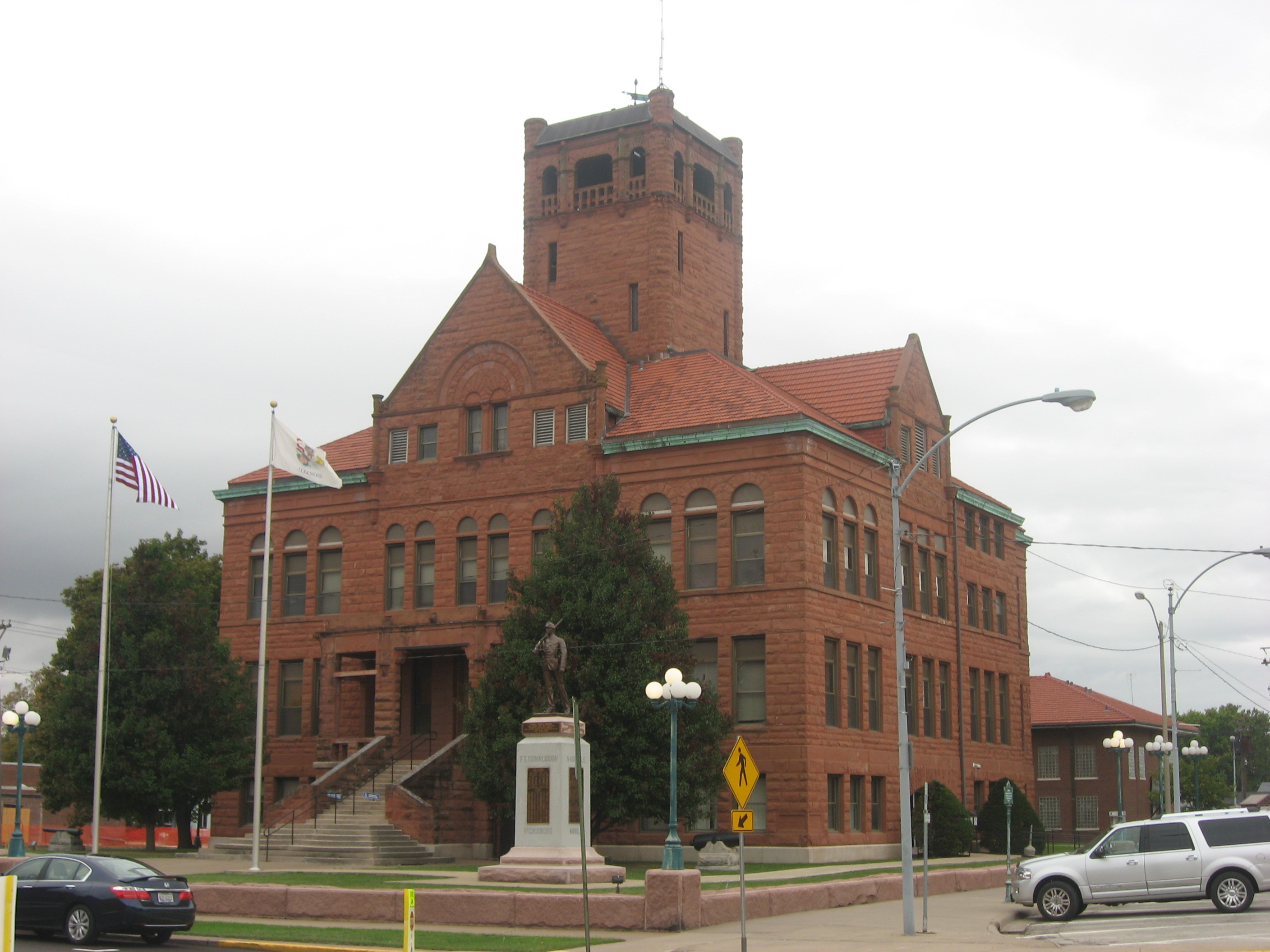
- Warren County Courthouse in Monmouth

- Location within the U.S. state of Illinois
- Coordinates: 40°51′N 90°37′W
- Country: United States
- State: Illinois
- Founded: 1825
- Named for: Joseph Warren
- Seat: Monmouth
- Largest city: Monmouth

Area
  - Total: 543 sq mi (1,410 km^{2})
  - Land: 542 sq mi (1,400 km^{2})
  - Water: 0.6 sq mi (1.6 km^{2}) 0.1%

Population (2020)
  - Total: 16,835
  - Estimate (2025): 16,222 ▼
  - Density: 31.1/sq mi (12.0/km^{2})
- Time zone: UTC−6 (Central)
  - Summer (DST): UTC−5 (CDT)
- Congressional districts: 15th, 17th
- Website: warrencountyil.gov

Warren County is a county in the U.S. state of Illinois. According to the 2020 census, it had a population of 16,835. Its county seat is Monmouth.

== History ==
Warren County was organized in 1825 out of Pike County which consisted of all portions of the state north and west of the Illinois River before 1825. Henderson County was formed in 1841 from the western area of Warren County.

Warren County was named for Dr. Joseph Warren, killed at the Battle of Bunker Hill in 1775. He is believed to have been the first officer to die in the Revolutionary War.

The current courthouse, constructed of red Portage stone, was completed in 1895.

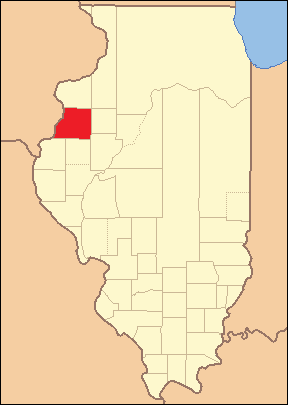
Warren County from the time of its creation to 1831

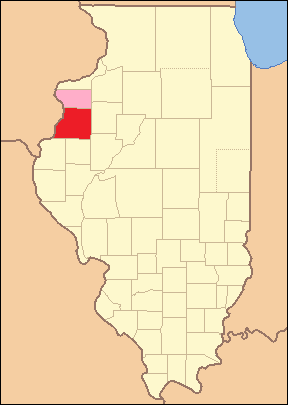
Between 1831 and 1835, Mercer County was temporarily attached to Warren until it could organize its own county government.

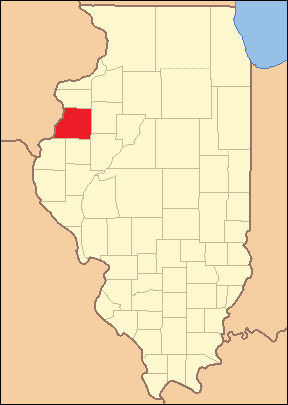
Warren County between 1835 and 1841

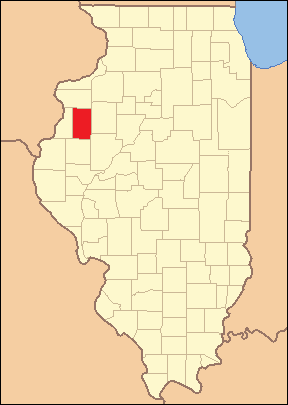
Warren County in 1841, reduced to its current borders by the creation of Henderson County

== Geography ==
According to the U.S. Census Bureau, the county has a total area of 543 square miles (1,410 km^{2}), of which 542 square miles (1,400 km^{2}) is land and 0.6 square miles (1.6 km^{2}) (0.1%) is water.

=== Climate and weather ===
Monmouth, Illinois

Climate chart (precipitation, max. and min. temperature)
J	F	M	A	M	J	J	A	S	O	N	D
1.6 31 15	1.7 37 21	2.9 49 30	3.8 63 41	4.3 73 51	4.3 81 60	4.3 85 64	4 83 62	3.5 77 54	3 65 43	2.7 49 32	2.3 35 20
- █ Average max. and min. temperatures in °F
- █ Precipitation totals in inches
- Source: The Weather Channel
Metric conversion
J	F	M	A	M	J	J	A	S	O	N	D
41 −1 −9	44 3 −6	72 9 −1	96 17 5	108 23 11	108 27 16	110 29 18	102 28 17	88 25 12	75 18 6	70 9 0	59 2 −7
- █ Average max. and min. temperatures in °C
- █ Precipitation totals in mm

In recent years, average temperatures in the county seat of Monmouth have ranged from a low of 15 °F (−9 °C) in January to a high of 85 °F (29 °C) in July, although a record low of −27 °F (−33 °C) was recorded in February 1905 and a record high of 110 °F (43 °C) was recorded in July 1936. Average monthly precipitation ranged from 1.62 inches (41 mm) in January to 4.33 inches (110 mm) in July.

=== Adjacent counties ===
- Mercer County (north)
- Knox County (east)
- Fulton County (southeast)
- McDonough County (south)
- Henderson County (west)

== Demographics ==
Historical population
Census	Pop.	Note	%±
1830	308		—
1840	6,739		2,088.0%
1850	8,176		21.3%
1860	18,336		124.3%
1870	23,174		26.4%
1880	22,933		−1.0%
1890	21,281		−7.2%
1900	23,163		8.8%
1910	23,313		0.6%
1920	21,488		−7.8%
1930	21,745		1.2%
1940	21,286		−2.1%
1950	21,981		3.3%
1960	21,587		−1.8%
1970	21,595		0.0%
1980	21,943		1.6%
1990	19,181		−12.6%
2000	18,735		−2.3%
2010	17,707		−5.5%
2020	16,835		−4.9%
2025 (est.)	16,222	▼	−3.6%
U.S. Decennial Census; 1790-1960 1900-1990; 1990-2000 2010

=== 2020 census ===
As of the 2020 census, the county had a population of 16,835. The median age was 40.9 years, with 21.3% of residents under the age of 18 and 21.0% aged 65 years or older. For every 100 females there were 98.1 males, and for every 100 females age 18 and over there were 96.5 males age 18 and over.

The racial makeup of the county was 82.2% White, 3.5% Black or African American, 0.4% American Indian and Alaska Native, 2.0% Asian, 0.1% Native Hawaiian and Pacific Islander, 5.6% from other races, and 6.2% from two or more races. Hispanic or Latino residents of any race comprised 10.6% of the population.

54.6% of residents lived in urban areas, while 45.4% lived in rural areas.

There were 6,720 households in the county, of which 27.4% had children under the age of 18 living in them. Of all households, 48.3% were married-couple households, 19.3% were households with a male householder and no spouse or partner present, and 25.2% were households with a female householder and no spouse or partner present. About 31.1% of all households were made up of individuals and 15.3% had someone living alone who was 65 years of age or older.

There were 7,602 housing units, of which 11.6% were vacant. Among occupied housing units, 74.4% were owner-occupied and 25.6% were renter-occupied. The homeowner vacancy rate was 2.5% and the rental vacancy rate was 8.3%.

=== Racial and ethnic composition ===
Warren County, Illinois – Racial and ethnic composition Note: the US Census treats Hispanic/Latino as an ethnic category. This table excludes Latinos from the racial categories and assigns them to a separate category. Hispanics/Latinos may be of any race.
Race / Ethnicity (NH = Non-Hispanic)	Pop 1980	Pop 1990	Pop 2000	Pop 2010	Pop 2020	% 1980	% 1990	% 2000	% 2010	% 2020
White alone (NH)	21,213	18,518	17,672	15,582	13,494	96.67%	96.54%	94.33%	88.00%	80.15%
Black or African American alone (NH)	360	355	296	287	577	1.64%	1.85%	1.58%	1.62%	3.43%
Native American or Alaska Native alone (NH)	31	20	30	32	31	0.14%	0.10%	0.16%	0.18%	0.18%
Asian alone (NH)	63	69	61	93	329	0.29%	0.36%	0.33%	0.53%	1.95%
Native Hawaiian or Pacific Islander alone (NH)	x	x	17	9	15	x	x	0.09%	0.05%	0.09%
Other race alone (NH)	41	12	6	9	46	0.19%	0.06%	0.03%	0.05%	0.27%
Mixed race or Multiracial (NH)	x	x	146	205	554	x	x	0.78%	1.16%	3.29%
Hispanic or Latino (any race)	235	207	507	1,490	1,789	1.07%	1.08%	2.71%	8.41%	10.63%
Total	21,943	19,181	18,735	17,707	16,835	100.00%	100.00%	100.00%	100.00%	100.00%

=== 2010 census ===
At the 2010 United States census, there were 17,707 people, 6,918 households and 4,617 families residing in the county. The population density was 32.6 inhabitants per square mile (12.6/km^{2}). There were 7,682 housing units at an average density of 14.2 per square mile (5.5/km^{2}). The racial makeup of the county was 91.3% white, 1.7% black or African American, 0.5% Asian, 0.2% American Indian, 0.1% Pacific islander, 4.5% from other races, and 1.6% from two or more races. Those of Hispanic or Latino origin made up 8.4% of the population. In terms of ancestry, 25.2% were German, 14.7% were Irish, 11.3% were English, 10.0% were Swedish, and 5.5% were American.

Of the 6,918 households, 29.6% had children under the age of 18 living with them, 52.2% were married couples living together, 9.7% had a female householder with no husband present, 33.3% were non-families, and 28.2% of all households were made up of individuals. The average household size was 2.40 and the average family size was 2.91. The median age was 39.6 years.

The median household income was $41,636 and the median family income was $49,623. Males had a median income of $40,289 and females $25,460. The per capita incomewas $20,047. About 11.0% of families and 13.4% of the population were below the poverty line, including 18.1% of those under age 18 and 10.6% of those age 65 or over.

== Politics ==
Warren County is located in Illinois's 17th Congressional District and is currently represented by Democrat Cheri Bustos. For the Illinois House of Representatives, the county is split between the 93rd district, currently represented by Republican Norine Hammond, and the 94th district, currently represented by Randy Frese. The county is located in the 47th district of the Illinois Senate, and is currently represented by Republican Jil Tracy.

In presidential elections, Warren County voted for the Republican Party's candidate in every election from 1936 through 1988, often by a wide margin. From 1992 to 2012, the contest in Warren County was more competitive, with the Democratic Party's candidate winning four out of six times. In every election since then, the county has voted Republican by increasing double-digit margins.

United States presidential election results for Warren County, Illinois
Year	Republican		Democratic		Third party(ies)	
Year	No.	%	No.	%	No.	%
1892	2,725	50.69%	2,294	42.67%	357	6.64%
1896	3,394	55.24%	2,604	42.38%	146	2.38%
1900	3,618	56.97%	2,501	39.38%	232	3.65%
1904	3,563	61.35%	1,559	26.84%	686	11.81%
1908	3,283	54.12%	2,327	38.36%	456	7.52%
1912	2,627	44.03%	2,080	34.86%	1,259	21.10%
1916	6,294	56.44%	4,498	40.33%	360	3.23%
1920	6,309	69.41%	2,236	24.60%	545	6.00%
1924	6,912	65.07%	2,440	22.97%	1,271	11.96%
1928	7,915	73.61%	2,681	24.93%	157	1.46%
1932	5,498	48.84%	5,610	49.83%	150	1.33%
1936	6,919	55.51%	5,409	43.39%	137	1.10%
1940	7,790	61.17%	4,878	38.30%	67	0.53%
1944	7,085	64.12%	3,926	35.53%	39	0.35%
1948	6,738	66.20%	3,367	33.08%	74	0.73%
1952	8,020	72.88%	2,973	27.02%	11	0.10%
1956	7,580	71.63%	2,996	28.31%	6	0.06%
1960	7,221	65.25%	3,835	34.66%	10	0.09%
1964	5,258	52.95%	4,670	47.02%	3	0.03%
1968	5,877	60.00%	3,085	31.50%	833	8.50%
1972	7,021	70.15%	2,969	29.67%	18	0.18%
1976	5,822	59.25%	3,808	38.75%	196	1.99%
1980	5,667	62.47%	2,756	30.38%	648	7.14%
1984	5,846	63.59%	3,318	36.09%	29	0.32%
1988	4,584	55.54%	3,617	43.82%	53	0.64%
1992	3,325	39.37%	3,661	43.35%	1,460	17.29%
1996	2,974	41.02%	3,500	48.28%	776	10.70%
2000	3,899	51.09%	3,524	46.18%	208	2.73%
2004	4,474	52.90%	3,938	46.56%	45	0.53%
2008	3,637	45.12%	4,286	53.17%	138	1.71%
2012	3,618	46.28%	4,044	51.73%	156	2.00%
2016	4,275	54.76%	2,987	38.26%	545	6.98%
2020	4,676	59.01%	3,090	39.00%	158	1.99%
2024	4,579	61.30%	2,711	36.29%	180	2.41%

== Transportation ==
=== Transit ===
- Burlington Trailways
- List of intercity bus stops in Illinois

=== Airport ===
- Monmouth Municipal Airport "info".

=== Major highways ===
- U.S. Highway 34
- U.S. Highway 67
- Illinois Route 94
- Illinois Route 116
- Illinois Route 135
- Illinois Route 164

== Law enforcement ==
=== State ===
- Illinois State Police District 14, Macomb

=== County ===
- Warren County Sheriff's Office

In a scene in the 2018 film "Halloween", the local sheriff drives a car that says Warren County Sheriff's Department. Confirming that the fictional town of Haddonfield is located in Warren County.

=== Municipal ===
- Alexis Police Department, Alexis
- Monmouth Police Department, Monmouth

=== Volunteer ===
Warren County/Monmouth Auxiliary Police Corps

== Communities ==
=== City ===
- Monmouth

=== Villages ===
- Alexis (partly in Mercer County)
- Kirkwood
- Little York
- Roseville

=== Census-designated place ===
- Cameron

=== Unincorporated communities ===
- Berwick
- Coldbrook
- Eleanor
- Gerlaw
- Greenbush
- Larchland
- Ormonde
- Ponemah
- Shanghai City
- Smithshire
- Swan Creek
- Utah
- Youngstown

=== Townships ===
Warren County is divided into these townships:

- Berwick
- Cold Brook
- Ellison
- Floyd
- Greenbush
- Hale
- Kelly
- Lenox
- Monmouth
- Point Pleasant
- Roseville
- Spring Grove
- Sumner
- Swan
- Tompkins

== Education ==
School districts include:

- Abingdon-Avon Community Unit School District 276
- Bushnell-Prairie City Community Unit School District 170
- Galesburg Community Unit School District 205
- Monmouth-Roseville Community Unit School District 238
- United Community School District 304
- West Central Community Unit School District 235

== See also ==
- National Register of Historic Places listings in Warren County, Illinois
