= Roseville Township, Warren County, Illinois =

Coordinates: 40°45′32″N 90°37′15″W

Roseville Township
- Township
- Location in Warren County
- Country: United States
- State: Illinois
- County: Warren
- Established: November 8, 1853

Area
  - Total: 36.64 sq mi (94.9 km^{2})
  - Land: 36.64 sq mi (94.9 km^{2})
  - Water: 0 sq mi (0 km^{2}) 0%

Population (2010)
  - Estimate (2016): 1,193
  - Density: 33.1/sq mi (12.8/km^{2})
- Time zone: UTC-6 (CST)
  - Summer (DST): UTC-5 (CDT)
- FIPS code: 17-187-65858

Roseville Township is located in Warren County, Illinois, United States. As of the 2010 census, its population was 1,213 and it contained 578 housing units.

The village of Roseville is located in this township.

== Geography ==
According to the 2010 census, the township has a total area of 36.64 square miles (94.9 km^{2}), all land.

== Demographics ==
Historical population
Census	Pop.	Note	%±
2016 (est.)	1,193
U.S. Decennial Census
