= Coldbrook, Illinois =

- Unincorporated community
- Location within Illinois Location within the United States
- Coordinates: 40°56′51″N 90°31′02″W
- Country: United States
- State: Illinois
- County: Warren
- Elevation: 768 ft (234 m)
- Time zone: UTC-6 (Central (CST))
  - Summer (DST): UTC-5 (CDT)
- Area code: 309
- GNIS feature ID: 422568

Coldbrook (also Cold Brook) is an unincorporated community in Warren County, Illinois, United States. Coldbrook is located on Illinois Route 164, 4 miles (6.4 km) north of Cameron.
