= Swan Township, Warren County, Illinois =

Coordinates: 40°40′11″N 90°36′43″W

Swan Township
- Township
- Location in Warren County
- Country: United States
- State: Illinois
- County: Warren
- Established: November 8, 1853

Area
  - Total: 35.34 sq mi (91.5 km^{2})
  - Land: 35.33 sq mi (91.5 km^{2})
  - Water: 0.01 sq mi (0.026 km^{2}) 0.03%

Population (2010)
  - Estimate (2016): 263
  - Density: 7.5/sq mi (2.9/km^{2})
- Time zone: UTC-6 (CST)
  - Summer (DST): UTC-5 (CDT)
- FIPS code: 17-187-74093

Swan Township is located in Warren County, Illinois, United States. As of the 2010 census, its population was 265 and it contained 126 housing units.

== Geography ==
According to the 2010 census, the township has a total area of 35.34 square miles (91.5 km^{2}), of which 35.33 square miles (91.5 km^{2}) (or 99.97%) is land and 0.01 square miles (0.026 km^{2}) (or 0.03%) is water.

== Demographics ==
Historical population
Census	Pop.	Note	%±
2016 (est.)	263
U.S. Decennial Census
