= Spring Grove Township, Warren County, Illinois =

Coordinates: 41°01′33″N 90°36′25″W

Spring Grove Township
- Township
- Location in Warren County
- Country: United States
- State: Illinois
- County: Warren
- Established: November 8, 1853

Area
  - Total: 36.92 sq mi (95.6 km^{2})
  - Land: 36.84 sq mi (95.4 km^{2})
  - Water: 0.08 sq mi (0.21 km^{2}) 0.22%

Population (2010)
  - Estimate (2016): 993
  - Density: 27.5/sq mi (10.6/km^{2})
- Time zone: UTC-6 (CST)
  - Summer (DST): UTC-5 (CDT)
- FIPS code: 17-187-72065

Spring Grove Township is located in Warren County, Illinois, United States. As of the 2010 census, its population was 1,013 and it contained 598 housing units.

A portion of the village of Alexis is located in this township.

== Geography ==
According to the 2010 census, the township has a total area of 36.92 square miles (95.6 km^{2}), of which 36.84 square miles (95.4 km^{2}) (or 99.78%) is land and 0.08 square miles (0.21 km^{2}) (or 0.22%) is water.

== Demographics ==
Historical population
Census	Pop.	Note	%±
2016 (est.)	993
U.S. Decennial Census
