= Ellison Township, Warren County, Illinois =

Coordinates: 40°45′45″N 90°44′03″W

Ellison Township
- Township
- Location in Warren County
- Country: United States
- State: Illinois
- County: Warren
- Established: November 8, 1853

Area
  - Total: 36.37 sq mi (94.2 km^{2})
  - Land: 36.37 sq mi (94.2 km^{2})
  - Water: 0 sq mi (0 km^{2}) 0%

Population (2010)
  - Estimate (2016): 334
  - Density: 9.3/sq mi (3.6/km^{2})
- Time zone: UTC-6 (CST)
  - Summer (DST): UTC-5 (CDT)
- FIPS code: 17-187-23516

Ellison Township is located in Warren County, Illinois, United States. As of the 2010 census, its population was 337 and it contained 140 housing units.

== Geography ==
According to the 2010 census, the township has a total area of 36.37 square miles (94.2 km^{2}), all land.

== Demographics ==
Historical population
Census	Pop.	Note	%±
2016 (est.)	334
U.S. Decennial Census
