= Alexis, Illinois =

- Village
- Interactive map of Alexis, Illinois
- Location in the United States
- Coordinates: 41°03′46″N 90°33′19″W
- Country: United States
- State: Illinois
- Counties: Warren, Mercer
- Townships: Spring Grove, Kelly, Suez, North Henderson

Area
  - Total: 0.47 sq mi (1.23 km^{2})
  - Land: 0.47 sq mi (1.23 km^{2})
  - Water: 0 sq mi (0.00 km^{2})
- Elevation: 699 ft (213 m)

Population (2020)
  - Total: 793
  - Density: 1,670/sq mi (644.8/km^{2})
- Time zone: UTC-6 (CST)
  - Summer (DST): UTC-5 (CDT)
- ZIP code: 61412
- Area code: 309
- FIPS code: 17-00672
- GNIS feature ID: 2397929

Alexis is a village in Mercer and Warren counties in Illinois, United States. The population was 793 at the 2020 census.

The Mercer County portion is part of the Davenport–Moline–Rock Island, IA-IL Metropolitan Statistical Area.

== History ==
Alexis was originally called Alexandria or Alexandria Station, and under the latter names was laid out in 1870 when the railroad was extended to that point. After learning of another Illinois town named Alexander, the founders wanted a new name. Around this time, Grand Duke Alexis was visiting the country, after whom the town was renamed.

== Geography ==
Alexis is located on the border between Warren and Mercer counties. Approximately four north–south blocks of the village are in Warren County, while two blocks north to south are in Mercer County. There are approximately six blocks measuring east to west in the village. In the 2000 census, 499 of Alexis' 863 residents (57.8%) lived in Warren County and 364 (42.2%) lived in Mercer County.

Alexis is 14 miles (23 km) northeast of Monmouth, the Warren County seat, and 19 miles (31 km) southeast of Aledo, the Mercer County seat.

According to the 2010 census, Alexis has a total area of 0.47 square miles (1.22 km^{2}), all land. Most of the village drains south to a tributary of Middle Henderson Creek, a west-flowing tributary of Henderson Creek, which continues west to the Mississippi River south of Oquawka. The northernmost part of the village drains north to Toms Creek, another tributary of Middle Henderson Creek.

== Demographics ==
Historical population
Census	Pop.	Note	%±
1880	398		—
1890	562		41.2%
1900	915		62.8%
1910	829		−9.4%
1920	830		0.1%
1930	786		−5.3%
1940	877		11.6%
1950	821		−6.4%
1960	878		6.9%
1970	946		7.7%
1980	1,076		13.7%
1990	908		−15.6%
2000	863		−5.0%
2010	831		−3.7%
2020	793		−4.6%
U.S. Decennial Census

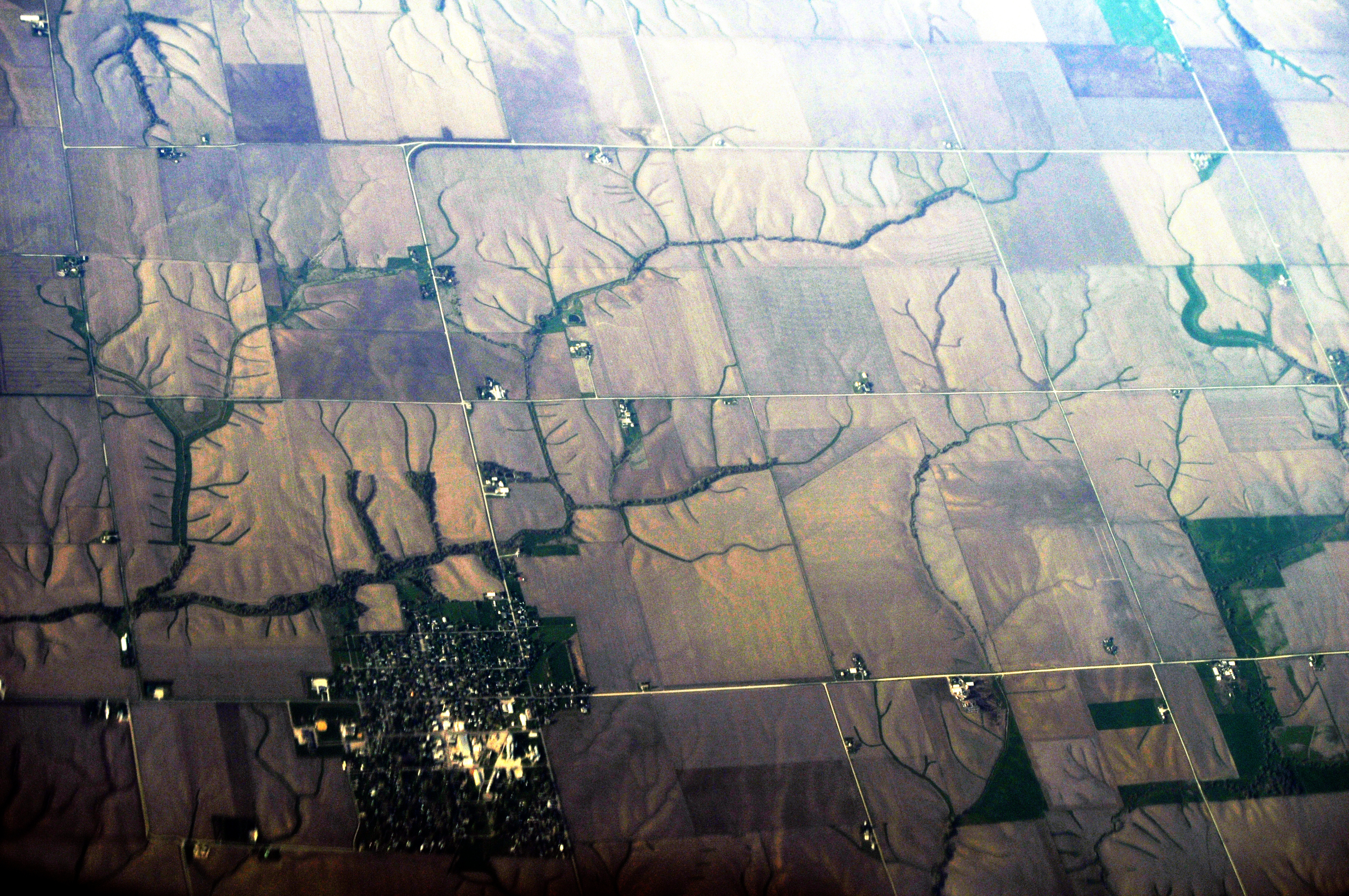
Aerial view of Alexis, 2012

As of the census of 2000, there were 863 people, 361 households, and 246 families residing in the village. The population density was 1,778.6 inhabitants per square mile (686.7/km^{2}). There were 383 housing units at an average density of 789.3 per square mile (304.8/km^{2}). The racial makeup of the village was 99.65% White, 0.12% from other races, and 0.23% from two or more races. Hispanic or Latino of any race were 2.20% of the population.

There were 361 households, out of which 28.3% had children under the age of 18 living with them, 58.7% were married couples living together, 6.6% had a female householder with no husband present, and 31.6% were non-families. 28.8% of all households were made up of individuals, and 15.5% had someone living alone who was 65 years of age or older. The average household size was 2.39 and the average family size was 2.94.

In the village, the population was spread out, with 24.3% under the age of 18, 7.0% from 18 to 24, 25.5% from 25 to 44, 24.1% from 45 to 64, and 19.1% who were 65 years of age or older. The median age was 40 years. For every 100 females, there were 88.0 males. For every 100 females age 18 and over, there were 88.7 males.

The median income for a household in the village was $36,705, and the median income for a family was $46,364. Males had a median income of $32,419 versus $19,000 for females. The per capita income for the village was $17,059. About 4.0% of families and 5.9% of the population were below the poverty line, including 4.0% of those under age 18 and 3.8% of those age 65 or over.

== Economy ==
Alexis Fire Equipment, a manufacturer of fire engines and fire fighting related equipment, is the village's largest employer.

== Education ==
It is in the United Community School District 304.

== Law enforcement ==
- Alexis Police Department
- Mercer County Sheriff's Office
- Warren County Sheriff's Office

== See also ==
- List of municipalities in Illinois
