= Burlington Trailways =

Iowa, US bus company (1929–2025)

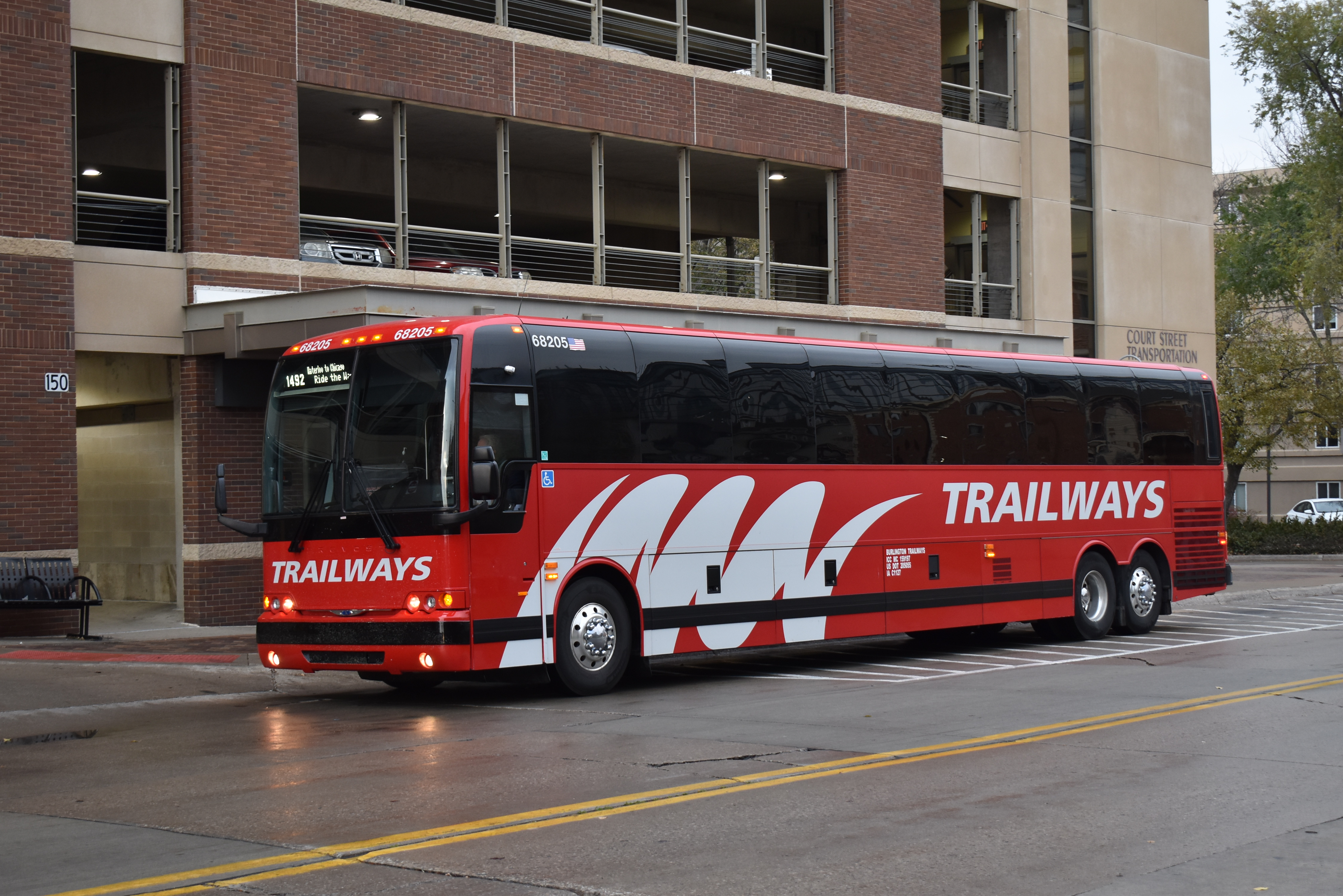
- A Burlington Trailways bus in Iowa City
- Founded: 1929
- Defunct: 2025
- Headquarters: West Burlington, Iowa, U.S.
- Service area: Western United States/Midwestern United States
- Service type: Intercity bus service
- Alliance: Trailways Transportation System, Greyhound Lines
- Fleet: > 24 coaches
- Website: burlingtontrailways.com

Burlington Trailways was an intercity bus company based in West Burlington, Iowa.

After 96 years of operations, Burlington announced it would cease scheduled intercity bus operations in September 2025, while shop services concluded all projects during December.

== History ==
Burlington Trailways was founded in 1929 as the Burlington Transportation Company, a subsidiary of the Chicago, Burlington and Quincy Railroad. It started as a bus line that ran through Highway 34. In 1934, the service expanded to Denver and Omaha and in 1935, from Chicago to California. In 1936, it was a charter member of the Trailways Transportation System, an association of independent intercity bus operators created to offset the growing strength of Greyhound Lines.

In 1952, Burlington Transportation Company was renamed into Burlington Trailways.

== Primary hubs ==
- Burlington, Iowa
- Davenport, Iowa
- Des Moines, Iowa
- Iowa City, Iowa
- Omaha, Nebraska

== Routes ==
As of September 2022, Burlington Trailways operates the following routes. Intermediate stops are not listed.

- 1201 Chicago to Omaha, Nebraska
- 1202 Omaha, Nebraska to Chicago
- 1205 Chicago to Des Moines, Iowa
- 1208 Des Moines, Iowa to Chicago
- 1401 Indianapolis to Denver
- 1402 Denver to Indianapolis
- 1489 Cedar Rapids, Iowa to St. Louis
- 1490 St. Louis to Cedar Rapids, Iowa
- 1491 Chicago to Burlington, Iowa
- 1492 Waterloo, Iowa to Chicago
- 1493 Dubuque, Iowa to Burlington, Iowa
- 1494 Burlington, Iowa to Dubuque, Iowa
- 1496 Burlington, Iowa to Davenport, Iowa
- 1498 Davenport, Iowa to Waterloo, Iowa

== See also ==
- Jefferson Lines
