= Roseville, Illinois =

Village in Illinois, US

Village of Roseville
- Village
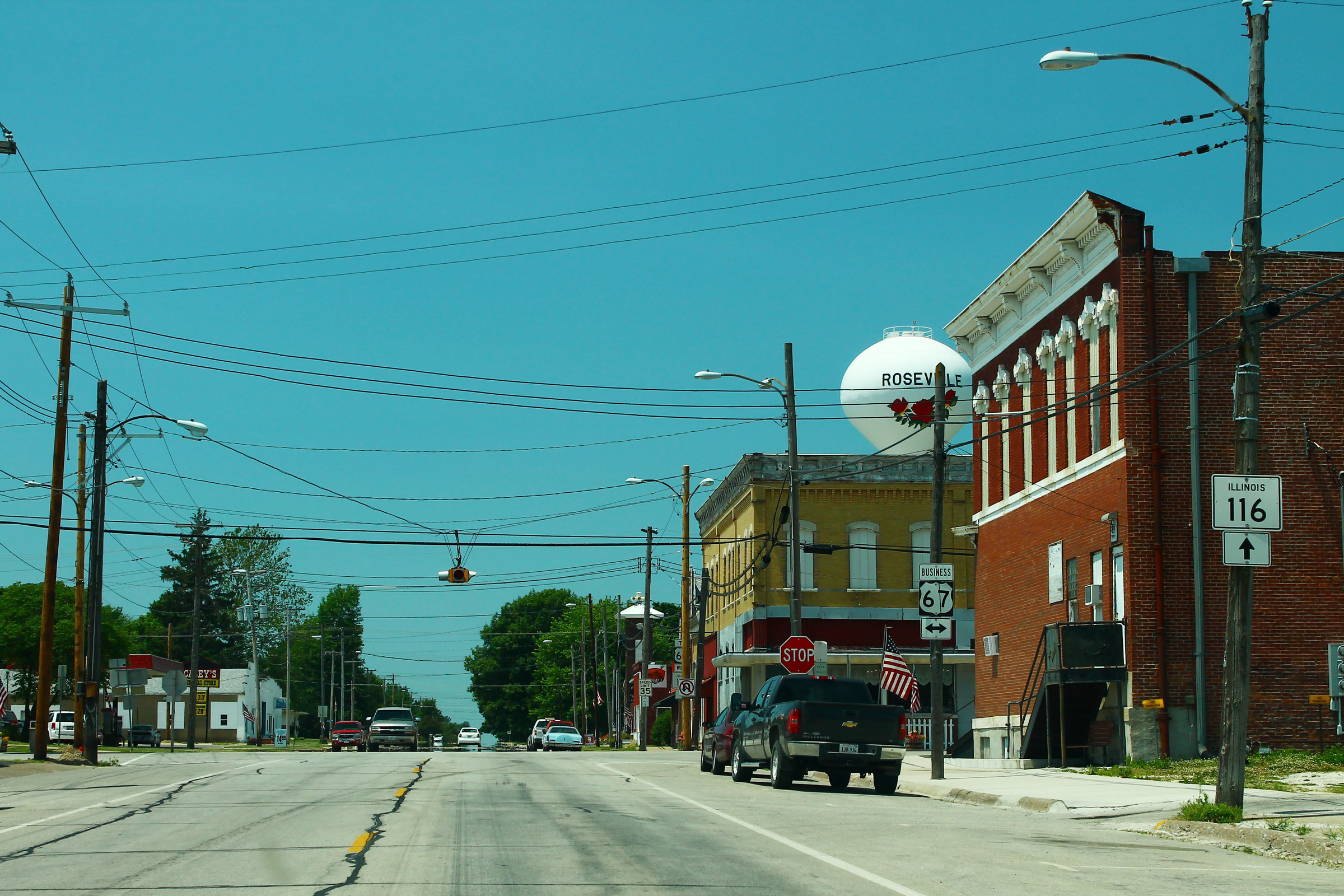
- Downtown Roseville

- Location of Roseville in Warren County, Illinois

- Location within the state of Illinois
- Coordinates: 40°43′51″N 90°39′50″W
- Country: United States
- State: Illinois
- County: Warren
- Township: Roseville

Government
  - Village President: Dan Taflinger

Area
  - Total: 0.74 sq mi (1.91 km^{2})
  - Land: 0.74 sq mi (1.91 km^{2})
  - Water: 0 sq mi (0.00 km^{2})
- Elevation: 742 ft (226 m)

Population (2020)
  - Total: 892
  - Density: 1,206.9/sq mi (465.99/km^{2})
- Time zone: UTC-6 (Central (CST))
  - Summer (DST): UTC-5 (CDT)
- Postal code: 61473
- Area code: 309
- FIPS code: 17-65845
- GNIS feature ID: 2399125
- Website: rosevilleil.com

Roseville is a village in Warren County, Illinois, United States. The population was 892 at the 2020 census. It is part of the Galesburg Micropolitan Statistical Area.

== History ==
It is said that a man named Truman Eldridge from Hancock, Massachusetts founded the settlement in 1838 or 1839. By 1843 the area became known as Hat Grove and in 1853 the name was changed to Roseville. When the Chicago, Burlington and Quincy Railroad was built through Warren County in the 1860s, local trade was able to expand beyond long journeys west to the Mississippi River and forward to St. Louis. With products instead moving north to the station in Monmouth.

Roseville was incorporated as a village on May 8, 1875.

== Geography ==
According to the 2010 census, Roseville has a total area of 0.81 square miles (2.10 km^{2}), all land.

== Demographics ==
Historical population
Census	Pop.	Note	%±
1880	804		—
1890	788		−2.0%
1900	1,014		28.7%
1910	882		−13.0%
1920	952		7.9%
1930	975		2.4%
1940	1,061		8.8%
1950	1,080		1.8%
1960	1,065		−1.4%
1970	1,111		4.3%
1980	1,254		12.9%
1990	1,151		−8.2%
2000	1,083		−5.9%
2010	989		−8.7%
2020	892		−9.8%
2021 (est.)	791	▼	−11.3%
U.S. Decennial Census

As of the census of 2000, there were 1,083 people, 438 households, and 296 families residing in the village. The population density was 1,333.3 inhabitants per square mile (514.8/km^{2}). There were 478 housing units at an average density of 588.5 per square mile (227.2/km^{2}). The racial makeup of the village was 99.45% White, 0.18% African American, 0.18% Native American, 0.09% Asian, and 0.09% from two or more races. Hispanic or Latino of any race were 0.46% of the population.

There were 438 households, out of which 28.1% had children under the age of 18 living with them, 54.8% were married couples living together, 10.0% had a female householder with no husband present, and 32.2% were non-families. 29.5% of all households were made up of individuals, and 17.8% had someone living alone who was 65 years of age or older. The average household size was 2.31 and the average family size was 2.83.

In the village, the population was spread out, with 21.6% under the age of 18, 7.0% from 18 to 24, 22.0% from 25 to 44, 22.4% from 45 to 64, and 27.0% who were 65 years of age or older. The median age was 44 years. For every 100 females, there were 80.5 males. For every 100 females age 18 and over, there were 74.7 males.

The median income for a household in the village was $32,031, and the median income for a family was $37,125. Males had a median income of $30,625 versus $18,594 for females. The per capita income for the village was $16,225. About 9.1% of families and 10.8% of the population were below the poverty line, including 13.0% of those under age 18 and 6.0% of those age 65 or over.

== Education ==
It is in the Monmouth-Roseville Community Unit School District 238.

== Notable people ==
- Larry Burright (1937― ), first baseman with the New York Mets and Los Angeles Dodgers
- Emma Smith DeVoe (1848―1927), suffragist; born in Roseville
- Hi West (1884―1963), pitcher for the Cleveland Naps; born in Roseville
