= National Register of Historic Places listings in Warren County, Illinois =

Location of Warren County in Illinois

This is a list of the National Register of Historic Places listings in Warren County, Illinois.

This is intended to be a complete list of the properties and districts on the National Register of Historic Places in Warren County, Illinois, United States. Latitude and longitude coordinates are provided for many National Register properties and districts; these locations may be seen together in a map.

There are 11 properties and districts listed on the National Register in the county.

This National Park Service list is complete through NPS recent listings posted March 21, 2025.

== Current listings ==
	Name on the Register	Image	Date listed	Location	City or town	Description
1	Alexis Opera House	Alexis Opera House	July 30, 1987 (#87001267)	101-105 N. Main St. 41°03′47″N 90°33′21″W	Alexis	
2	May (Carns) and John E. Brewer House		December 26, 2023 (#100009641)	320 South First Street; 40°54′31″N 90°38′50″W	Monmouth	
3	Carr House	Carr House	August 11, 1988 (#88001229)	416 E. Broadway; 40°54′44″N 90°38′36″W	Monmouth	
4	E. B. Colwell and Company Department Store	E. B. Colwell and Company Department Store	February 3, 1993 (#92001851)	208 S. Main St. and 211 S. A St. 40°54′38″N 90°38′55″W	Monmouth	
5	Sarah Martin House	Sarah Martin House	October 9, 1980 (#80001414)	310 E. Broadway; 40°54′44″N 90°38′42″W	Monmouth	
6	Monmouth Courthouse Commercial Historic District	Monmouth Courthouse Commercial Historic District	February 1, 2006 (#05001604)	Roughly bounded by Archer Ave., 1st St., 2nd Ave., and A St. 40°54′43″N 90°38′54″W	Monmouth	
7	Patton Block Building	Patton Block Building	November 2, 1990 (#90001727)	88 and 90 Public Sq. 40°54′46″N 90°38′55″W	Monmouth	
8	Pike-Sheldon House	Pike-Sheldon House	August 12, 1999 (#99000976)	406 S. Third St. 40°54′29″N 90°38′41″W	Monmouth	
9	Ivory Quinby House	Ivory Quinby House	November 20, 1980 (#80001415)	605 N. 6th St. 40°55′03″N 90°38′25″W	Monmouth	
10	Minnie Stewart House	Minnie Stewart House	October 19, 1989 (#89001733)	1015 E. Euclid Ave. 40°55′00″N 90°38′07″W	Monmouth	
11	William S. Weir, Jr. House	William S. Weir, Jr. House	August 18, 1992 (#92001004)	402 E. Broadway; 40°54′44″N 90°38′38″W	Monmouth	

== See also ==
- List of National Historic Landmarks in Illinois
- National Register of Historic Places listings in Illinois
