= Small-town opera house =

Facilities in rural U.S. communities

Small-town opera houses exist in rural communities throughout the United States. Unlike metropolitan opera houses in the United States and other areas of the world, small-town opera houses in the U.S. were constructed to operate as theatrical, versus operatic, performance venues. The name "opera house" was generally applied to the buildings to differentiate them from less reputable facilities.

== History ==
From the 1850s to 1920s, opera houses were constructed in a vast number of small communities in the United States, usually with the backing of a local commercial patron and with the intent – according to historian Ann Satterthwaite – of signaling "to the world that the town was civilized". In Colorado alone, 132 opera houses were built from 1860 to 1920.

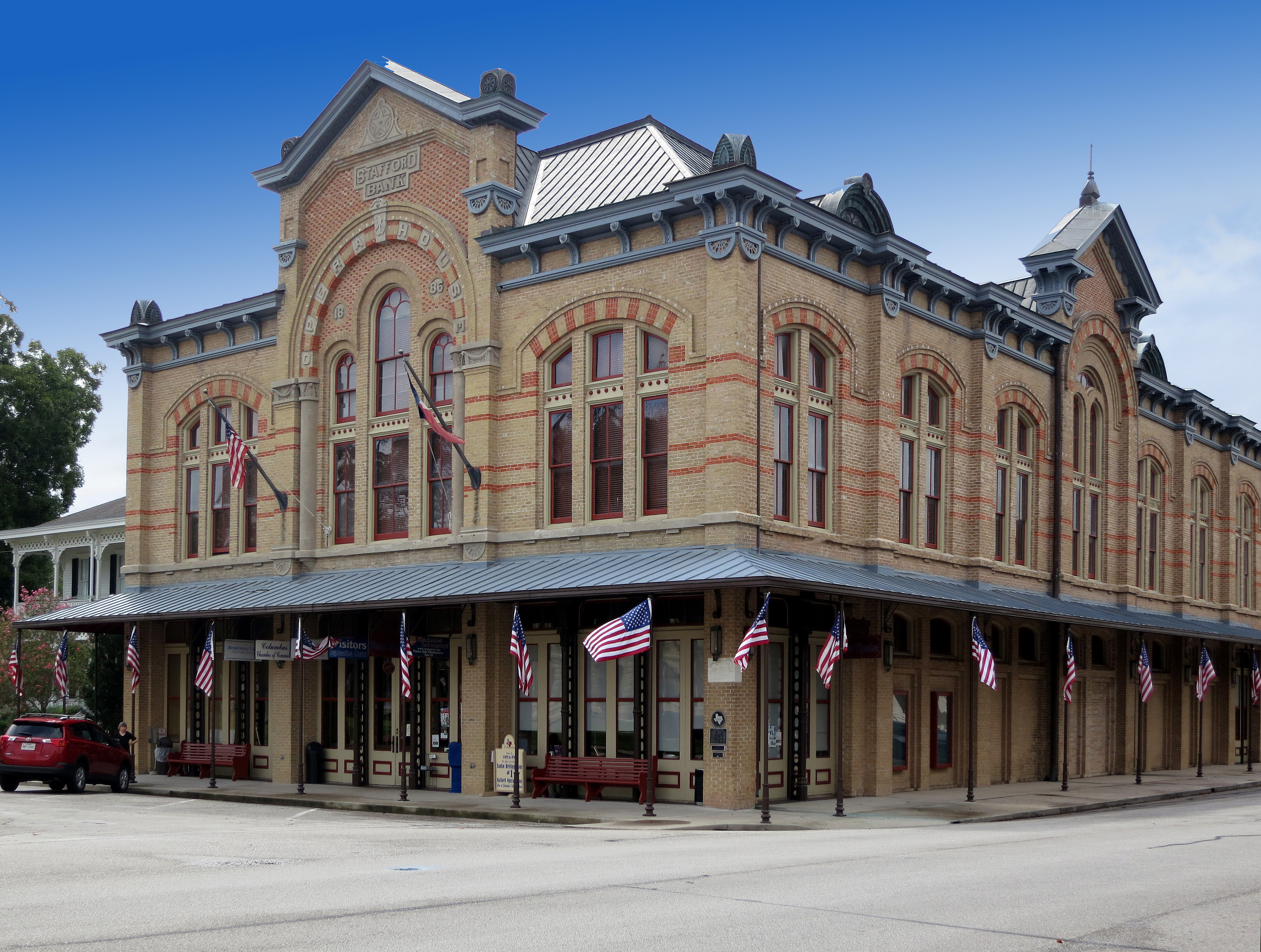
The Stafford Opera House in Columbus, Texas, pictured in 2014

The importance of opera houses as cultural and entertainment venues in small communities in the United States ended with the growing ubiquity of cinema in the 1920s.

=== "Opera House" versus "Theater" ===
Opera houses in small towns in the United States were usually so-named to avoid the déclassé connotations that the word "theater" had in the 19th century U.S. In some towns in the American West, theaters were known as venues that hosted "box-rustling", a form of erotic dancing.

=== Performances ===
Despite the name "opera house", small-town opera houses generally did not house repertory opera companies but, instead, served as general theaters to host touring productions of plays and vaudevillian shows, as well as occasional operatic performances, that brought popular entertainment from urban areas in the Eastern United States into more recently settled parts of the country. When not used for performances, they also functioned as community centers. As of 2018, the Harrington Bank Block & Opera House in Harrington, Washington, which opened in 1904, had never staged an opera.

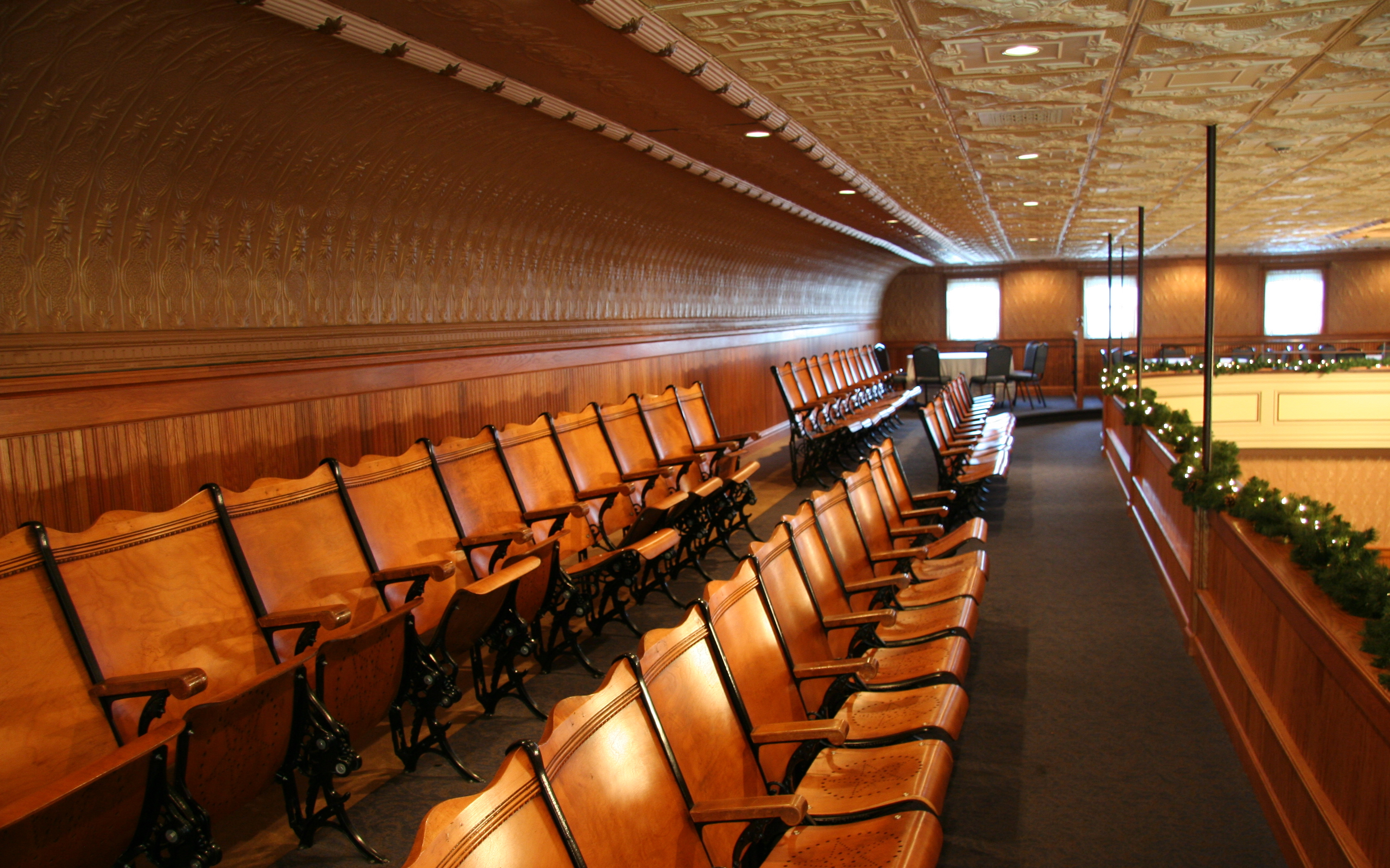
The balcony of the Steyer Opera House in Decorah, Iowa, pictured in 2009

Emma Abbott's English Opera Company, touring lectures by Mark Twain, Joseph Jefferson's famous portrayals of Rip Van Winkle, and approximately 500 theater troupes dedicated solely to the performance of Uncle Tom's Cabin were among popular touring attractions considered performance staples of small-town opera houses during the 19th century.

== Design and architecture ==
Many small-town opera houses constructed during the 18th and early 19th centuries consisted of a stage with adjoining dressing rooms located on an upper floor of a multi-story building, with lower levels occupied by retail space or the meeting rooms of fraternal associations. In the Great Plains, opera houses generally had a seating capacity ranging from 200 to 1600.

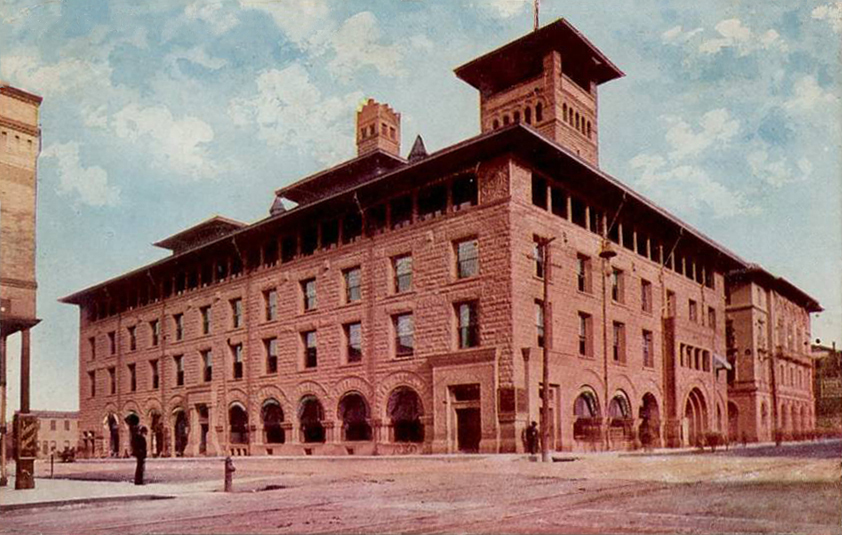
A 1912 postcard image depicting the Grand Opera House in Pueblo, Colorado, which was destroyed by fire in 1922

== Preservation ==
In 2019, the Preservation League of New York State created an inventory of historic, small-town opera houses in New York as part of its efforts to preserve this type of building.

== See also ==
- Alexis Opera House
- The Calumet Theatre
- Central City Opera House
- Woodstock Opera House
