= Patton Block Building =

- U.S. National Register of Historic Places
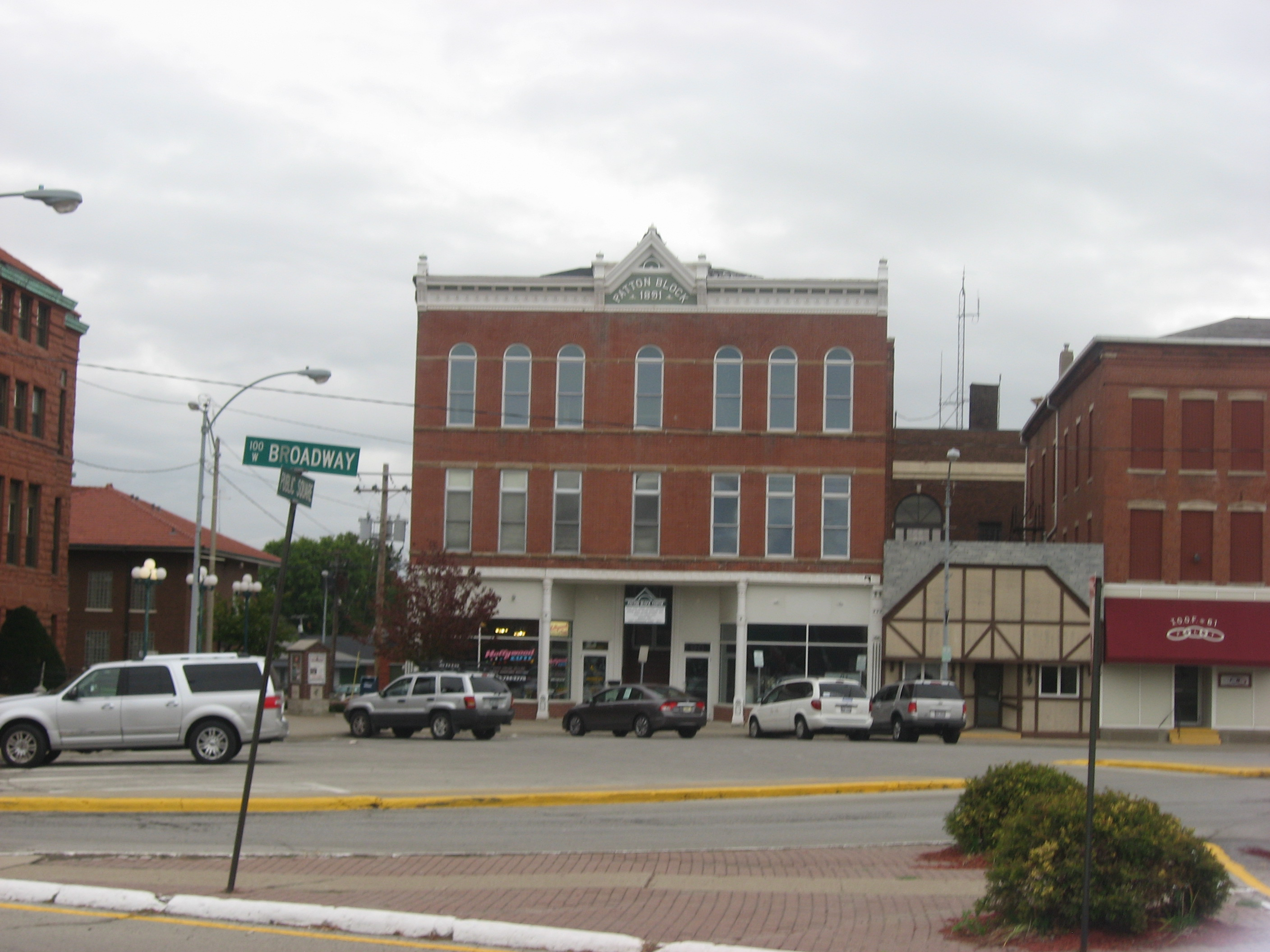

- Location within Illinois Location within the United States
- Location: 88 and 90 Public Sq., Monmouth, Illinois
- Coordinates: 40°54′46″N 90°38′57″W
- Area: less than one acre
- Built: 1891
- Architectural style: Chicago, Commercial
- NRHP reference No.: 90001727
- Added to NRHP: November 2, 1990

The Patton Block Building is a historic commercial building located at 88–90 Public Square in Monmouth, Illinois. Monmouth businessman and politician Robert S. Patton built the building in 1891. The red brick building was designed in the Commercial style. The building was built with stained glass panels in the top portions of its upper story windows; it is the only commercial building in Monmouth to have used stained glass. A number of different businesses have occupied the building, including two movie theaters; the first of these, the La Grande Theatre, opened in 1909 and was one of the first movie theaters in Monmouth. In addition, several fraternal organizations and social clubs have used the building as a meeting space, including the Rebekahs, the Fraternal Order of Eagles, and the Modern Woodmen of America.

The building was added to the National Register of Historic Places on November 2, 1990. It is also a part of the Monmouth Courthouse Commercial Historic District, which is also listed on the NRHP.
