= Monmouth Courthouse =

The Monmouth Courthouse may refer to:

- Monmouth County Courthouse, in Freehold Borough, New Jersey
- Monmouth Courthouse Commercial Historic District, listed on the NRHP in Monmouth, Illinois
- Monmouth Courthouse, New Jersey, an earlier name for Freehold Borough, New Jersey
