= Stice =

Stice is a surname. According to the 2010 United States census, it is borne by 2,721 people, 91% of whom identify as white. Notable people with the surname include:

== Real people ==
- Jamie Stice (1989/1990 – 2011), murder victim
- Lawrence H. Stice (1906–1975), American businessman and politician
- Luke Stice (1979/1980 – 1985), murder victim

== Fictional characters ==
- Ortho Stice, student at the Enfield Tennis Academy in the 1996 novel Infinite Jest

== See also ==
- SoulStice, American rapper
