= Pike-Sheldon House =

Historic house in Illinois, United States

- U.S. National Register of Historic Places
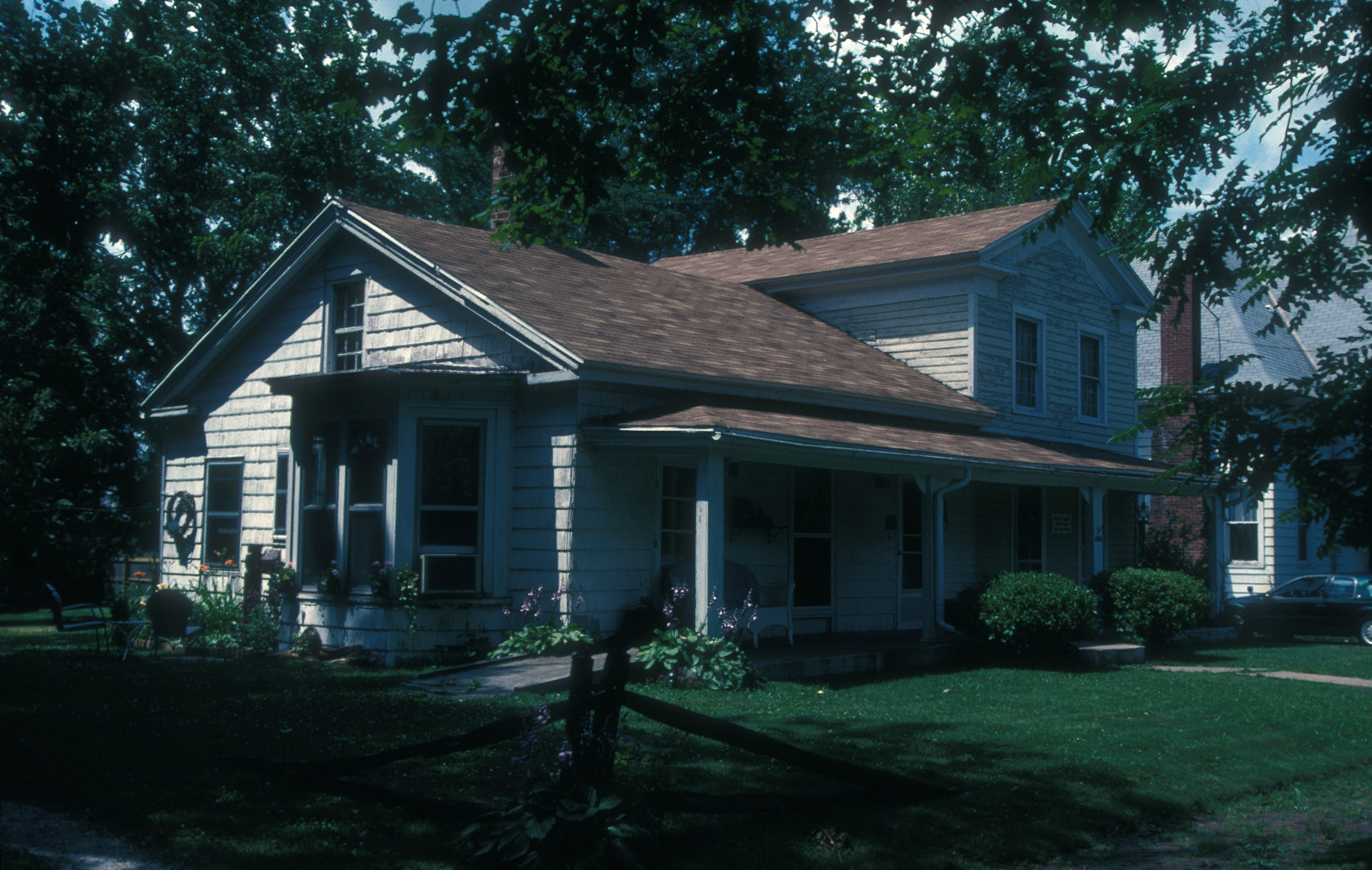

- Location within Illinois Location within the United States
- Location: 406 South Third Street, Monmouth, Illinois
- Coordinates: 40°54′29″N 90°38′41″W
- Area: less than one acre
- NRHP reference No.: 99000976
- Added to NRHP: August 12, 1999

The Pike-Sheldon House, located at 406 South 3rd Street in Monmouth, Illinois, is a historic home and the birthplace of lawman Wyatt Earp. The house features an Upright and Wing plan with a Greek Revival design; its two-story upright section was constructed circa 1841, while its one-story wing was added circa 1868. The Upright and Wing plan was popular among houses built in the early settlement of the Midwest. The home's Greek Revival elements include a wide banded frieze, sash windows, and cornice returns. Wyatt Earp was born in the home in 1848, while his aunt was renting the house. The house is one of the oldest homes in Monmouth and one of only two Upright and Wing homes remaining in the city.

The house was added to the National Register of Historic Places on August 12, 1999.

The Wyatt Earp Birthplace Museum now occupies the house.
