= Sarah Martin House =

Historic house in Illinois, United States

- U.S. National Register of Historic Places
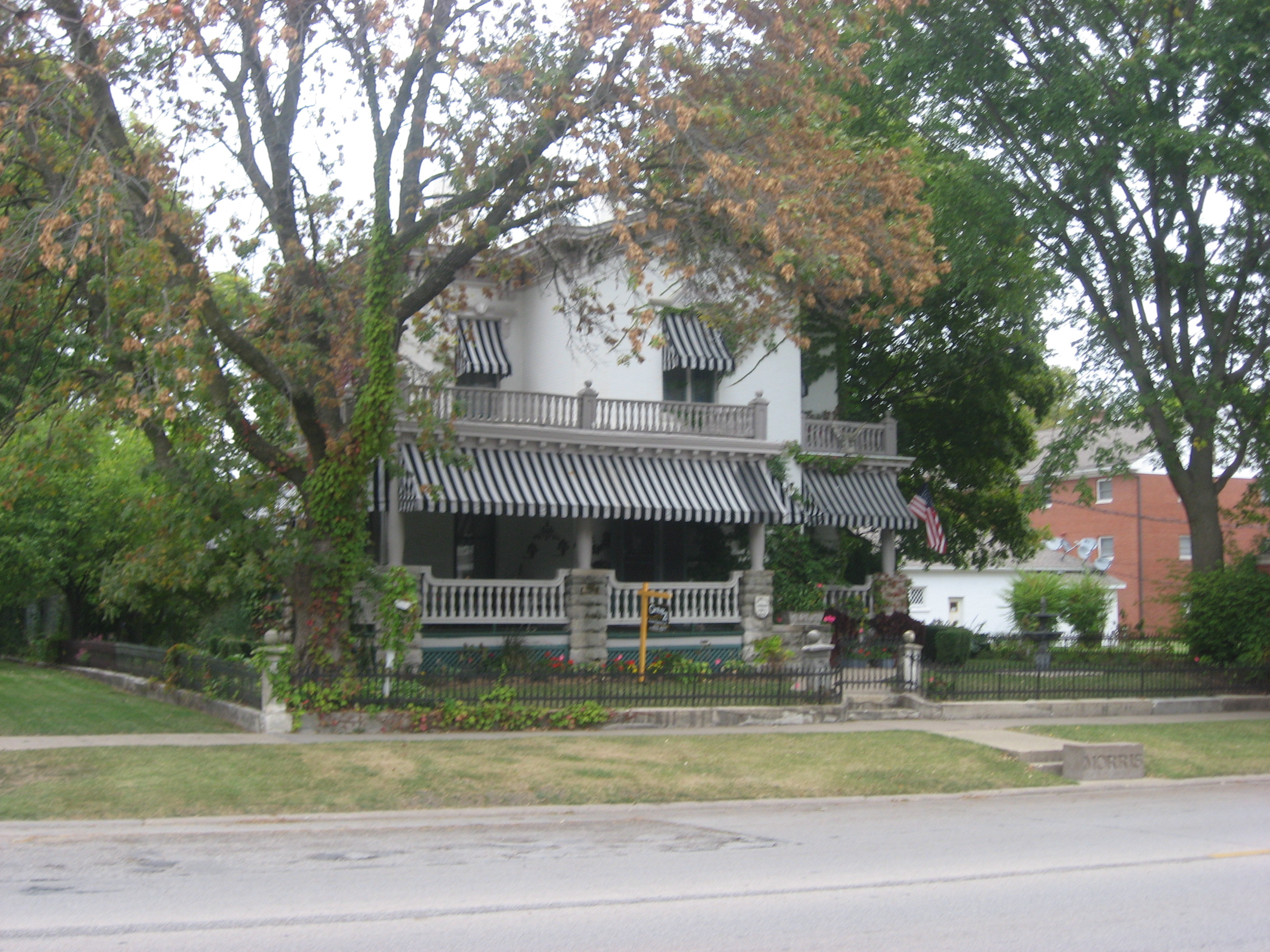

- Location within Illinois Location within the United States
- Location: 310 East Broadway, Monmouth, Illinois
- Coordinates: 40°54′30″N 90°38′55″W
- Area: less than one acre
- Built: 1875–1878
- Architectural style: Italian Villa
- NRHP reference No.: 80001414
- Added to NRHP: October 9, 1980

The Sarah Martin House is a historic home located at 310 East Broadway in Monmouth, Illinois. Constructed from 1875 to 1878, the Italian Villa style house was the home of Monmouth socialite Sarah Martin. It was added to the National Register of Historic Places on October 9, 1980.

== History ==
John Martin, a farmer and banker and the father of Sarah Martin, had the house built for his family in 1875. Upon its completion in 1878, the house was considered one of the most attractive homes in Monmouth. John and his wife died in 1880, and Sarah inherited the home at 14 years of age. Sarah studied at Monmouth College from 1887 to 1891, becoming a highly educated woman in an era when women's education was neither common nor encouraged. She became a prominent Monmouth socialite and hosted large parties and gatherings; as she was also a musician, she frequently entertained at her events. A supporter of universal education, Martin both volunteered for and gave money to Monmouth College. In 1914, Martin married John Fahey, and the couple moved to Sunnyvale, California in the late 1920s; Sarah nonetheless owned her home in Monmouth until 1945.

== Architecture ==
The Sarah Martin House was designed in the Italian Villa style. The two-story house, which includes an attic and basement, was built with brick layered 16 to 22 inches (410 to 560 mm) thick. The house's pitched roof is topped by a small cupola; the roof's flared eaves are decorated with brackets, dentils, and medallions. Three large bays contain the home's dining room and two front living rooms. A wraparound porch encircles the front side and west corner of the home. The home's windows are arranged in groups of two on the upper stories and groups of four on the bays, as is typical of the style. An iron fence, which still includes three of its original stone headers, surrounds the property.

The home includes a significant number of detailed decorations. The front door and each window are topped by ornamental cut stone headers, while cast iron headers with the home's year of completion carved in wood top the second-story windows. Three leaded glass windows adorn the front of the home, while two etched glass windows are located in and atop the front door. The amount of time put into this detail work led to the house's relatively lengthy construction period.
