= Adam Edward Ludy =

American pioneer

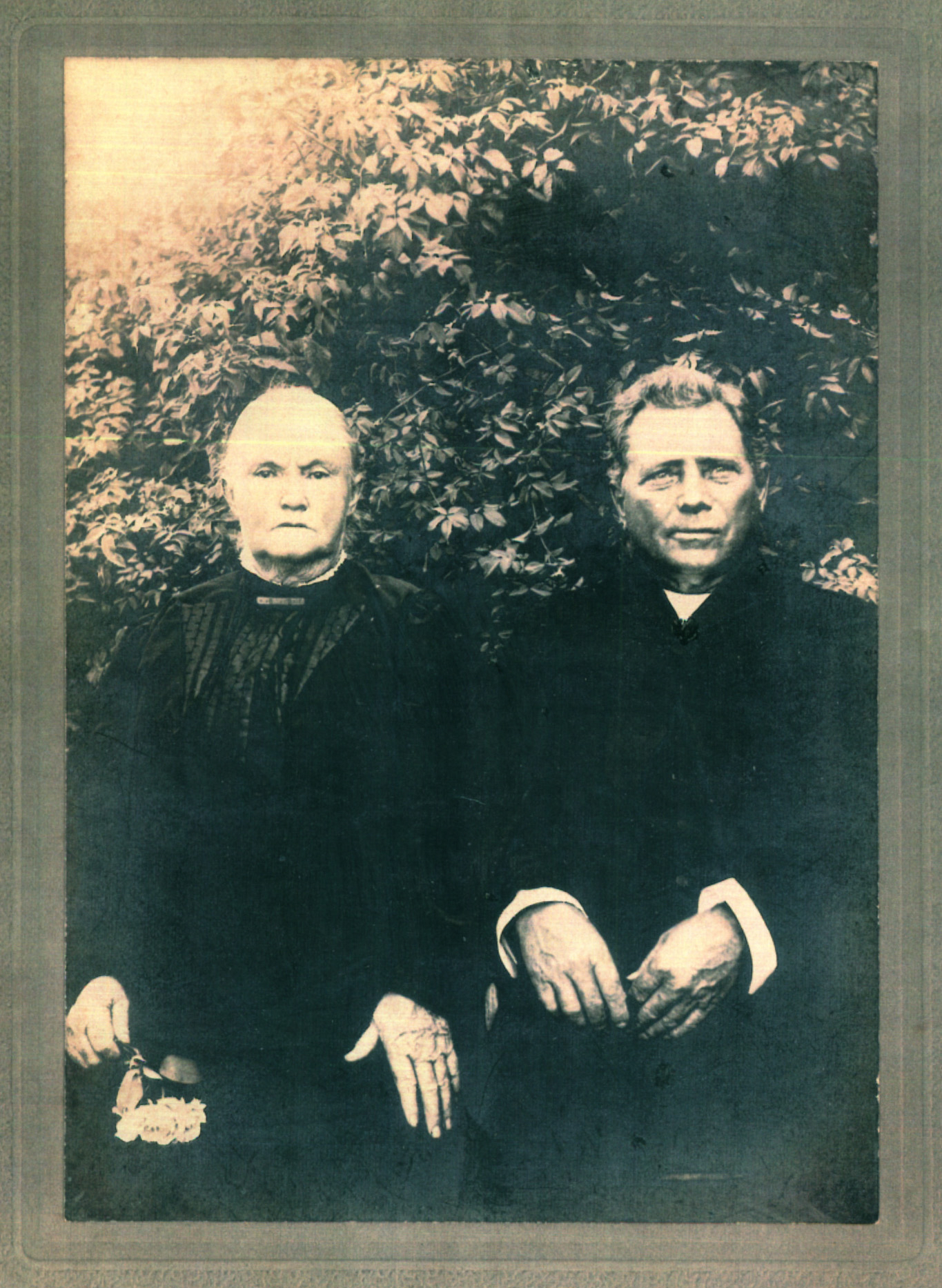
- Adam Edward Ludy and wife Amanda (née Stone) Ludy circa 1900
- Born: 30 April 1831; Maryland, U.S.
- Died: 25 August 1910 (aged 79); Phoenix, Arizona, U.S.
- Spouse: Amanda Stone (1835–1903)
- Children: Lydia Melinda Ludy (Shields) (1854–1898) Jacob Edward Ludy (1858–1921) Sarah "Sadie" Ludy (Hannum) (c.1862–c.1921)
- Military career
- Allegiance: United States
- Branch: Enrolled Missouri Militia
- Service years: 1862–1863

Adam Edward Ludy (30 April 1831 – 25 August 1910), was an American Civil War veteran and pioneer of the American frontier crossing the California Trail in 1864. He and his son, Jacob Edward Ludy (1858–1921), were the first settlers of Harrington, Washington (1879).

== Early life ==
In 1839, at the age of eight, Adam Edward Ludy and his parents (John Ludy 1793–1880 and Susannah Maugans 1799–1864) traveled from Maryland to central Ohio by wagon. His parents purchased a partially-cleared tract of land on the Scioto River in Delaware County, Ohio. Adam first attended school in 1842 at the age of 11 in a deserted log cabin where writing practice was done with, "goose quills, occasionly [sic] eagle feathers".

In 1845, at the age of 14, Adam was apprenticed by his father to a blacksmith in Hagerstown, Maryland and, "In August of 1848 with all my possessions in a knapsack strapped on my shoulders I started for Ohio."

== American Civil War service ==
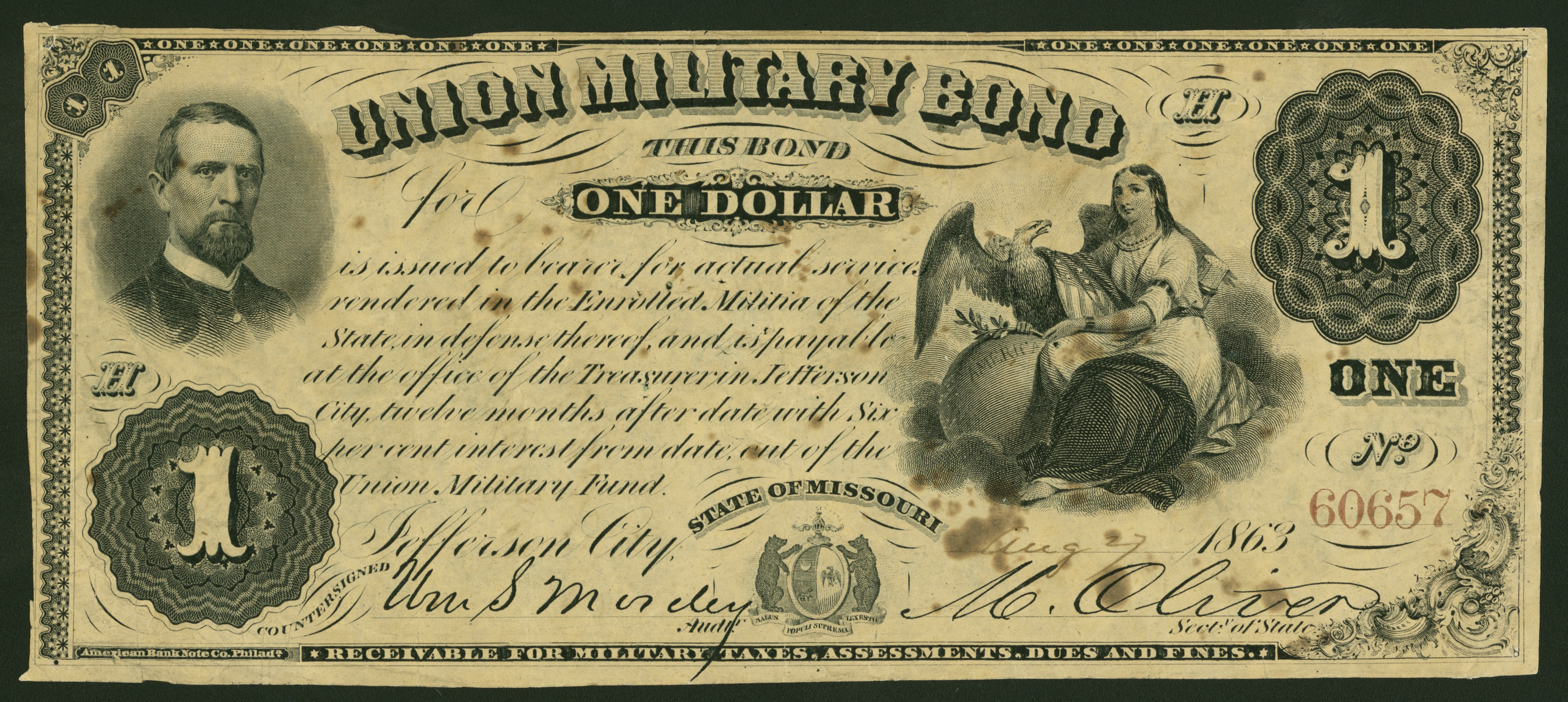
Union military bond used as a form of payment to members of the Enrolled Missouri Militia

In 1856, he and his wife established a farm in Mercer County, Missouri. On 22 July 1862, Missouri Governor Hamilton Rowan Gamble issued General Order 19 establishing the Enrolled Missouri Militia (Union). Service was mandatory for all able-bodied men who were loyal to the United States.

Adam wrote, "In 1862 the provisional Governor ordred everie able bodied man in the state to repoarte at the nrest military poast with a hoarse and gun if he had them. The state was infested with bandes of confederates known as gorilles. One of the bandes had crossed the Misouri river and went as fare north as Boneparty Iowa and had an ingagement in Scyler Co Misouri. At this time the malishy ware organised. We were on our way to Lancaster when the battle at that place was being fought. The com[m]ander of the poaste at kirks vill (see Battle of Kirksville) had ten men arrested as hoastages. There was a promenant man missing and it was sopoased that some confederates had killed him. They ware given a number of dayes to make the wheare abouts of the man known. In case they failed they ware to be shot. They failed and ware executed.

"The entreaties and suplecations of a wife of one of the doomed men for the life of her husband so afected a young man that he offered to take his plaice. He was excepted as a substitute an Shot in his stead...

"...I had orders to asist in to take all armes from all the citisens in my district. With a small compny of men I reluctantly executed the oarders. They ware naturaley reluctent to give up theare armes. There was apeal from the order. It was a painful taske as fire armes ware in maney ways yousefull in a new counterie. The armes ware stoared at the nrst military poaste. The order was evidentely a wide measure. Wilds animals and wilde foule increased so rapidly in the next three yeares in conciquence of the war that they ware moare numerous than thet had ben for years before."

== Crossing the California Trail ==
Emigrant trails west

Adam and his family, weary of the war, sold their property and decided to journey west to California. Adam wrote, "We started in company with eight famileys that ware going to Califourney on the eleventh day of April 1864. I had a four hoarse teeme of superior animalls with all that was sopoased to bee necesary for so long a journey. The traine intuitively acepted Mc Murphy as captaine of our traine. The traine concisted of thirty five men, women and children."

The family had numerous interactions with American Indians on their way west. Adam recorded one such occasion in Wyoming, "As we came on to some fine grass at nune we stop[p]ed to take lunch and the traine passed on. While our hoarses ware graising I see a comp[a]ny of mounted Indians with lances and in bat[t]le arey being painted sweaping down towards us as swift as the wind. We ware aloane. The traine was out of sight and they ware coming directeley to[w]ards us and in a moament ware opon us, the children running under the wagons. They demanded bread. My wife handed me each a slice. After eating it they demanded moare. I pointed to the children and moashened them away. After parting a moament they flead as rapideley as they had ap[p]roached, to my greate realiefe. We hitched up and in a shoarte time we ware with the traine agane."

== First settler of Harrington, Washington ==
Harrington is located in Lincoln County, Washington

Disillusioned with life in California, Adam decided to sell his stock and machinery and seek a new beginning. He wrote, "The third day of June 1879 in company with my son then nearley 21 years oald we started for the territory of Washington with a spring wagon and camping out fit with two superior hoarses."

When they arrived at the site where the future city of Harrington, Washington, was to be founded, "We selected locations with springs and running water free from stoane neare coald creake with a view to raising stalke. The a bundens of neaver failing springs that never frease up in winter and sections of the creake remaining open during winter and the vast extent of onocupyed rich pasturage appeared to invite us to stop."

"We filed on our lands, each 320 acres, each a hoame stead and a timber culture and improvements. We put in much of our time cuting poals for fencing. Our time [team] being exosted and we having failed to find horses to suit us and being 120 [miles] from Walla Walla, the pointe of suplyes, and 40 miles to a saw mill, our nearest and onely neibour west of us was thirty miles distent. N.W. thare ware 2 men living from 30 to 40 miles. North 2 about the same distence. All had natives for wives excepting one. To the N. E. it was 30 miles to the nerist nabour. East 8 miles and south 16 miles. Coald Creake was 40 miles in length and had not a single ocupent til we located. We ware 15 miles from fine timber and no roades but Indian trailes."

== Later life and death ==
Adam eventually traveled to Arizona in order to assist his son, Jacob Edward Ludy, with irrigation projects in and around Yuma, Arizona. Adam died at the Territorial Asylum for the Insane (later renamed Arizona State Hospital) in Phoenix, Arizona, 25 August 1910.
