= Carr House (Monmouth, Illinois) =

Historic house in Illinois, United States

- U.S. National Register of Historic Places
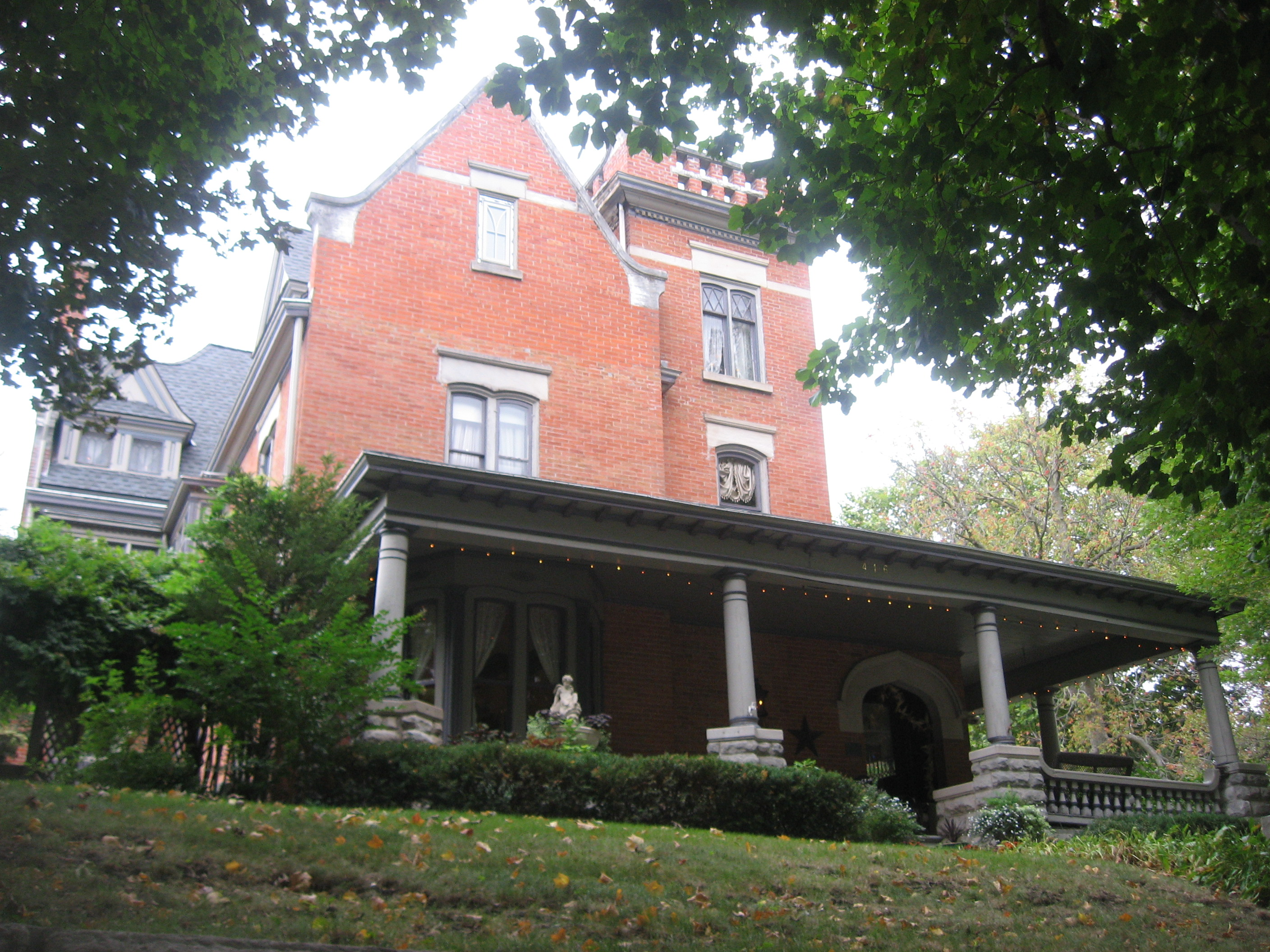

- Location within Illinois Location within the United States
- Location: 416 E. Broadway, Monmouth, Illinois
- Coordinates: 40°54′44″N 90°38′36″W
- Area: less than one acre
- Built: 1877
- Built by: Davis, George B.
- Architectural style: Classical Revival, Victorian Gothic, Jacobethan Revival
- NRHP reference No.: 88001229
- Added to NRHP: August 11, 1988

The Carr House is a historic house located at 416 East Broadway in Monmouth, Illinois. The house was built in 1877, and local blacksmith John Carr and his family moved to the house three years later. In 1898, Carr's daughters hired contractor George B. Davis to extensively redesign the home, which originally had a Second Empire design. Davis' design includes elements of the Classical Revival, Jacobethan, and Victorian Gothic styles and is the only high style eclectic home remaining in Monmouth. The roof's gables with parapets and stone string courses are a key Jacobethan element, while the house's porches and balconies have a Classical influence; the Victorian Gothic elements, such as dormers and window treatments, are less distinctive.

The house was added to the National Register of Historic Places on August 11, 1988.
