= Minnie Stewart House =

Historic house in Monmouth, Illinois, US

- U.S. National Register of Historic Places
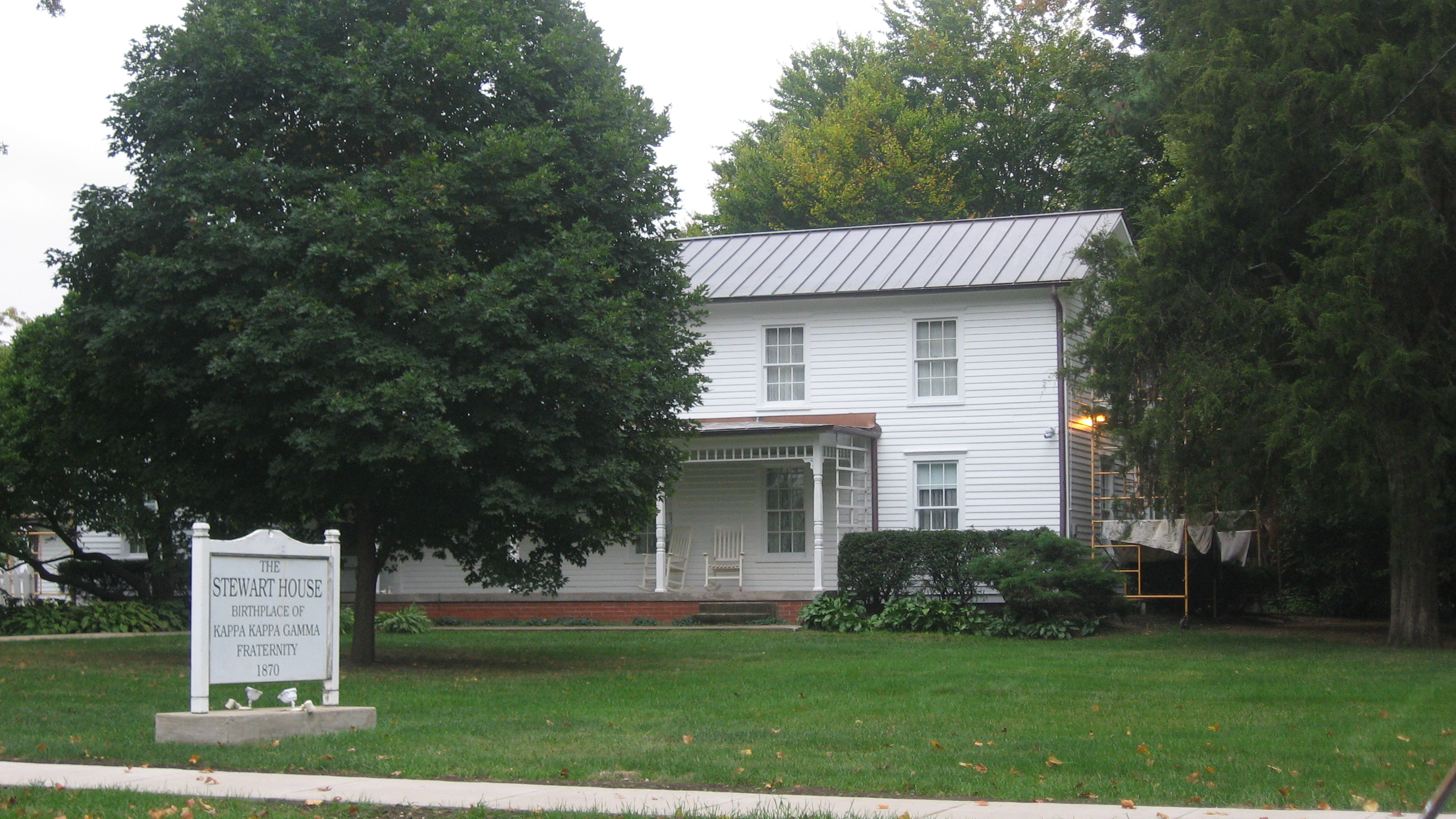

- Location within Illinois Location within the United States
- Location: 1015 E. Euclid Ave., Monmouth, Illinois, U.S.
- Coordinates: 40°54′59″N 90°38′5″W
- Area: less than one acre
- Built: c. 1865
- Architectural style: Italianate
- NRHP reference No.: 89001733
- Added to NRHP: October 19, 1989

The Minnie Stewart House is a mid-19th century house located at 1015 East Euclid Avenue, in Monmouth, Illinois. It was the site of the formation of women's fraternity Kappa Kappa Gamma. The house was added to the National Register of Historic Places on October 19, 1989.

== History ==
Judge James H. Stewart and his wife Isabella built the house near Monmouth, Illinois around 1864. Their daughter, Minnie Moore Stewart, was a student at the nearby Monmouth College. Minnie and five other students planned Kappa Kappa Gamma women's fraternity and wrote its constitution during meetings held in the house between 1869 and 1870. The fraternity was one of the first Greek organizations for women in the United States. Stewart served as the chapter's first president and first Grand President of the national fraternity. Kappa Kappa Gamma is still nationally prominent today.

The judge left the house to his son, William Stewart, who left it to his daughter, Lucretia Stewart Weir. Her daughter, Mary Weir Huff, moved into the house in 1939. When she died in 1988, she left the house to her sons, William Weir and Albert Weir. They sold the house to the Kappa Kappa Gamma fraternity in September 1989.

The Kappa Kappa Gamma Foundation operates the house as a historic house museum, with the downstairs rooms furnished in a Victorian style. The house was added to the National Register of Historic Places on October 19, 1989.

== Architecture ==
The Minnie Steward House is a two-story white frame structure located at 1015 E. Euclid Avenue. It was built around 1864 and originally consisted of a central two-story house with a one-story wing and a secondary utility building. Later, two-story wings were added to the east and west. It is in the Italianate style.
