= William S. Weir Jr. House =

Historic house in Illinois, United States

- U.S. National Register of Historic Places
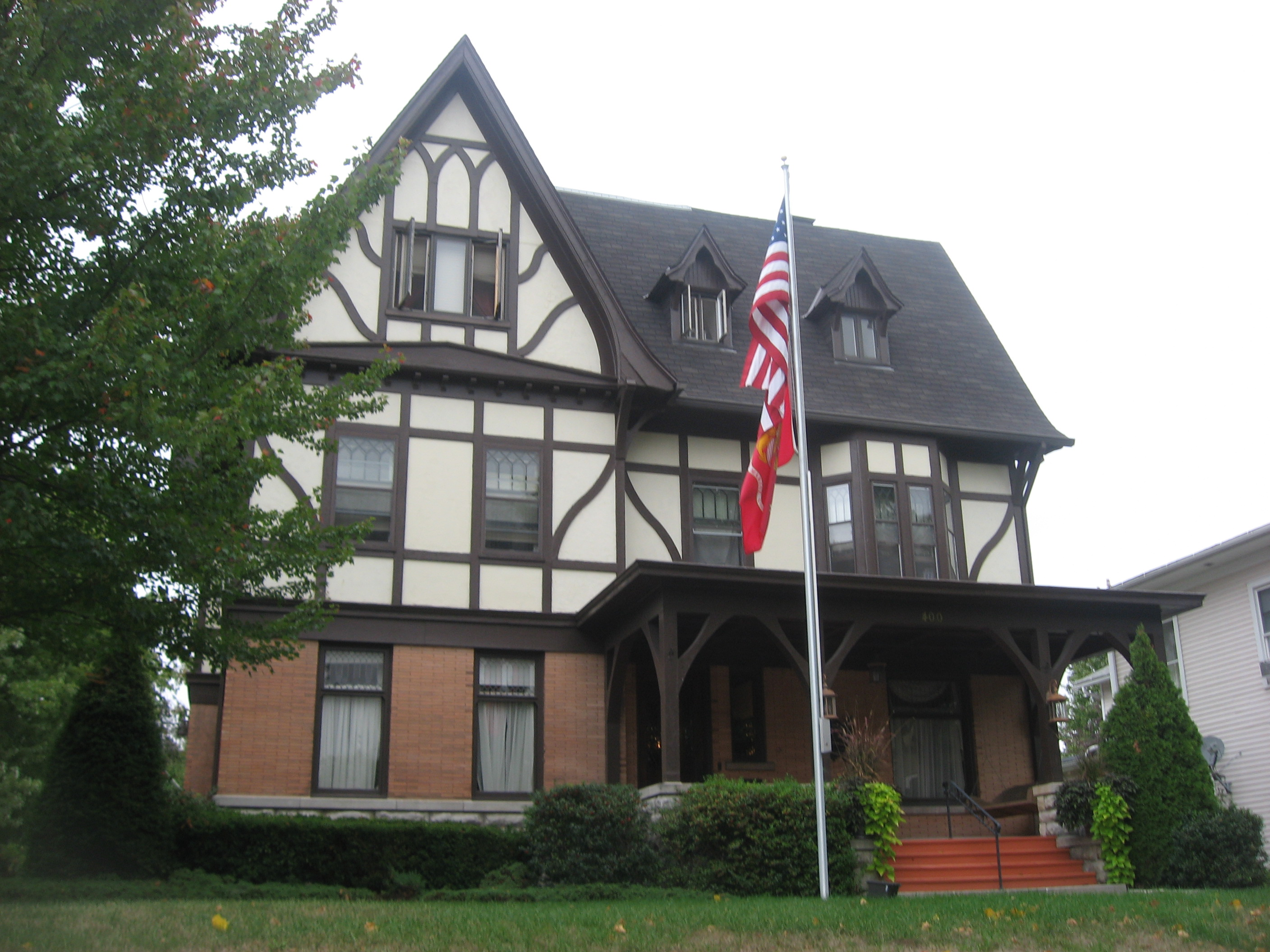

- Location within Illinois Location within the United States
- Location: 402 E. Broadway, Monmouth, Illinois
- Coordinates: 40°54′44″N 90°38′38″W
- Area: less than one acre
- Built: 1894
- Architectural style: Tudor Revival
- NRHP reference No.: 92001004
- Added to NRHP: August 18, 1992

The William S. Weir Jr. House is a historic house located at 402 East Broadway in Monmouth, Illinois. The house was built in 1894 for William S. Weir Jr. a local investor and businessman. Weir began selling plows and cultivators of his own invention in the 1860s, and his company had become nationally recognized and a major financial success by the time he sold his ownership interest in 1886. Weir continued to innovate in the locally prominent stoneware and pottery industry and invested in the development of the nearby village of Alexis. Weir's house has a Tudor Revival design with ornamental half-timbering in the front, a steep cross gabled roof, and groups of windows with decorative multi-pane glasswork.

The house was added to the National Register of Historic Places on August 18, 1992.
