= E. B. Colwell and Company Department Store =

- U.S. National Register of Historic Places
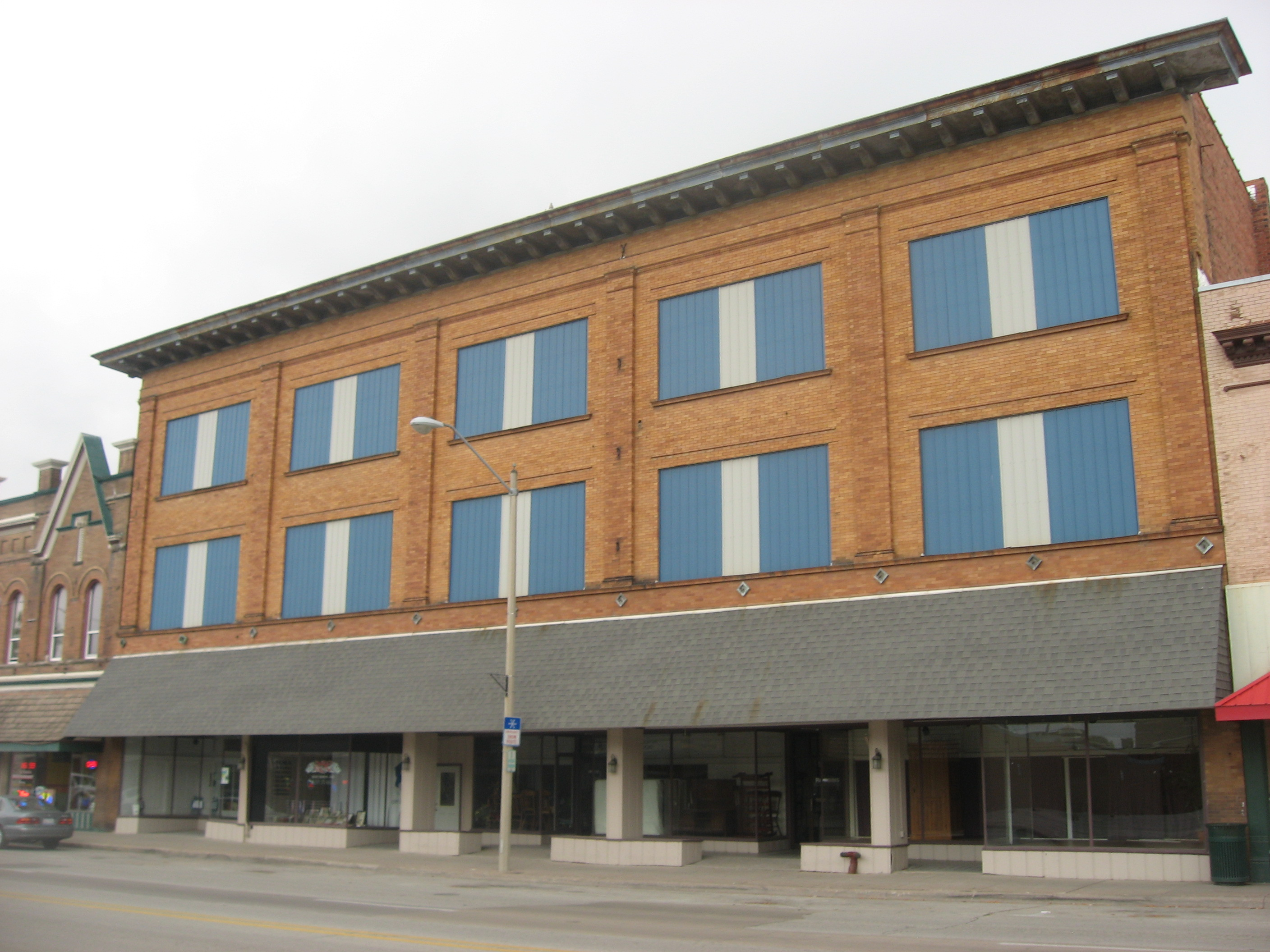

- Location within Illinois Location within the United States
- Location: 208 S. Main St. and 211 S. A St., Monmouth, Illinois
- Coordinates: 40°54′38″N 90°38′55″W
- Area: less than one acre
- Built: 1904
- Architect: Beadle, J. Grant
- Architectural style: Chicago school
- NRHP reference No.: 92001851
- Added to NRHP: February 3, 1993

The E. B. Colwell and Company Department Store is a historic department store building located at 208 South Main Street and 211 South A Street in Monmouth, Illinois. Local businessman Edward B. Colwell had the store built in 1904. Architect J. Grant Beadle of Galesburg designed the three-story Chicago school building. The store was Monmouth's only true department store; its main competitor, the Allen Store, was the largest dry goods store in Monmouth but was nonetheless smaller than the Colwell store. Shoppers came to the store from throughout Warren County, and from elsewhere in western Illinois via car and interurban railroad. The store's size and reputation allowed it to sell goods such as china under their own brand name, and it came to be known as "the Marshall Field's of western Illinois". The store suffered a downturn during the Great Depression, and while Colwell's second wife kept it in business for many years, the couple sold their store in 1959.

The building was added to the National Register of Historic Places on February 3, 1993.
