= Alexis Opera House =

- U.S. National Register of Historic Places
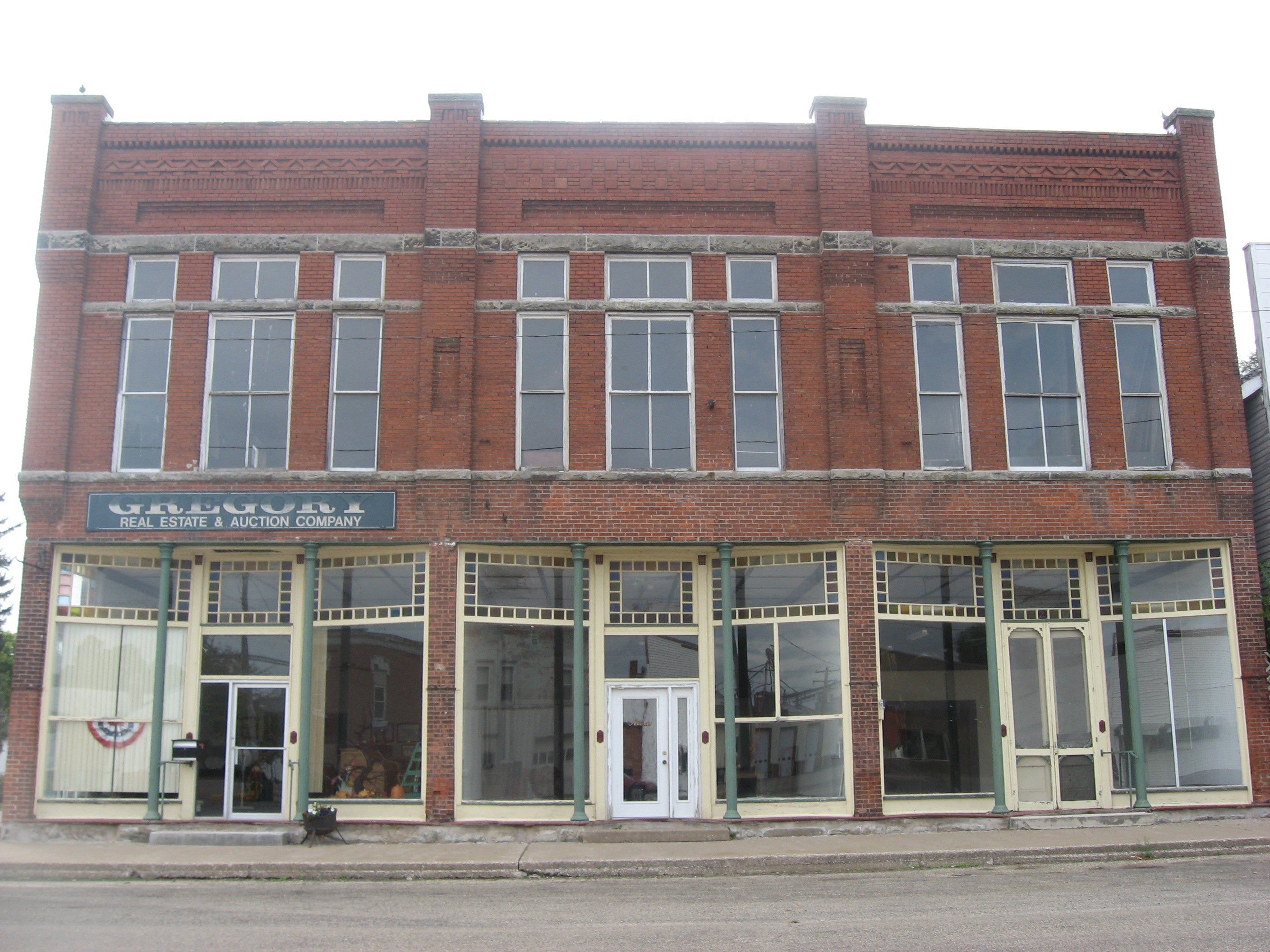

- Location within Illinois Location within the United States
- Location: 101--105 N. Main St., Alexis, Illinois
- Coordinates: 41°3′46″N 90°33′21″W
- Area: less than one acre
- Architectural style: Romanesque
- NRHP reference No.: 87001267
- Added to NRHP: July 30, 1987

The Alexis Opera House is a historic theater building located at 101–105 N. Main St. in Alexis, Illinois. The building, which operated from 1889 until 1920, hosted traveling entertainment and community functions. It was added to the National Register of Historic Places on July 30, 1987.

== History ==
The opera house was constructed in 1889 by William S. Weir, a Monmouth businessman who also owned the Bank of Alexis. It hosted its first show on November 1 of the same year, when the May Bretonne Company performed there. The opera house hosted traveling theatrical acts, musicians, and lecturers and advertised itself as hosting an act every three weeks. In addition, a number of civic functions were held in the building; Alexis High School held its graduation ceremony in the opera house every year until the building's closure, and numerous public meetings and community performances took place there as well. In the 1910s, religious services were also held in the building.

In 1920, the state's fire marshal shut down the opera house over safety code violations, as the building had no fire escape and its seats were not attached to the floor. The building's owner, William A. McKnight, considered the changes too expensive to be worth undertaking and never reopened the opera house. McKnight continued to run a funeral parlor and hardware store in the building's commercial spaces through 1950.

== Architecture ==
The Alexis Opera House was designed in the Romanesque Revival style. The two-story building's plan features three storefronts on its first floor and the theater on its second. The front facade is divided into bays delineating the three storefronts; the storefronts feature recessed glass entrances supported by columns, while the second floor is constructed of brick. Brick piers which extend through the roofline separate the second-story bays. Each bay features three vertical sets of windows, with one wide set in the middle of each bay and narrower sets on its sides. Limestone coursing marks the top and bottom of the second-story windows and separates the clerestory windows from the rest. The parapet roof features ornamental brickwork.
