= Harrington Bank Block & Opera House =

Historic building in Harrington, Washington

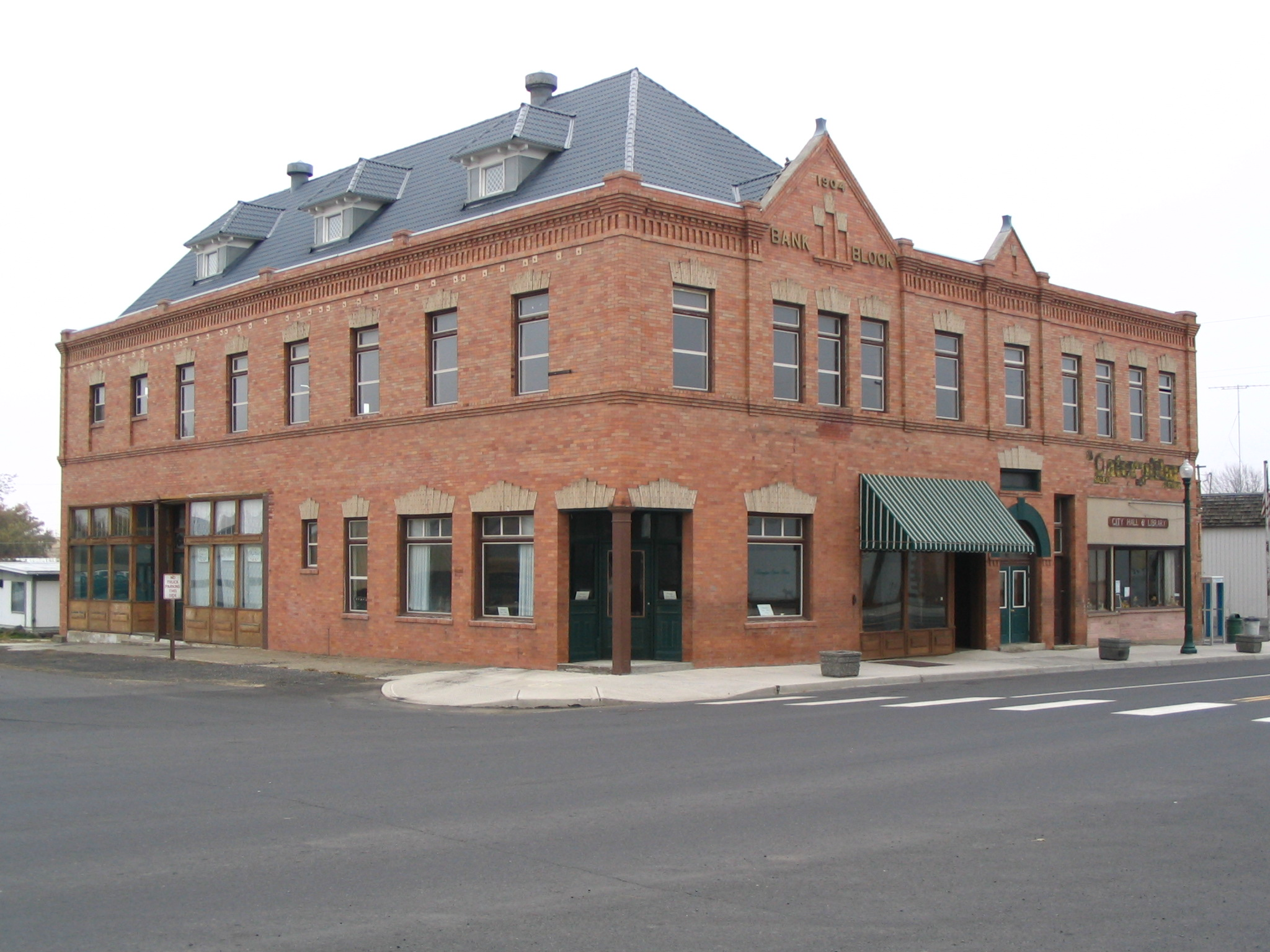
- Interactive map of Harrington Bank Block & Opera House
- Location: Harrington, Washington
- Coordinates: 47°28′48″N 118°15′18″W

Website
- Official website

The Harrington Bank Block & Opera House is a historic building in Harrington, Washington, listed on the National Register of Historic Places since 1992.

The Harrington Opera House first opened to the "largest attendance in the history of Harrington" on December 16, 1904.

The 350 seat Opera House auditorium is part of the Bank Block, an imposing building sitting on the corner of Willis and South Third Streets. Designed and constructed out of locally made bricks by the Harrington firm of J.R. Burrill and Company, it was completed in December, 1904.

The Bank of Harrington was located on the main floor. L. V. Sisum, owner of the Harrington Planing Mill, provided the wood interior and furnishings of the bank. Also on the ground floor were J.W. Dow's shaving parlors, R. Brenchley's cigar and confectionery store, and the Harrington Citizen. There was a bowling alley under the cigar store and on the second floor was the opera house and a lodging house separated by a wall from the auditorium.

The Harrington Opera House Society was founded on January 11, 1992 to preserve the old opera house and Bank Block Building.
