= Lawrence H. Stice =

American politician (1905-1973)

Lawrence H. Stice (July 6, 1905–September 21, 1973) was an American businessman and politician.

Stice was born in Warren County, Illinois. He lived with his wife and family in Monmouth, Illinois. Stice served as the real estate department manager for the Illinois Bankers Assurance Company. He served in the Illinois House of Representatives in 1935 and 1936. Stice was a Democrat. He died in Hot Springs, Arkansas. Stice had lived in Roseville, Illinois.
