= Harrington, Washington =

- City
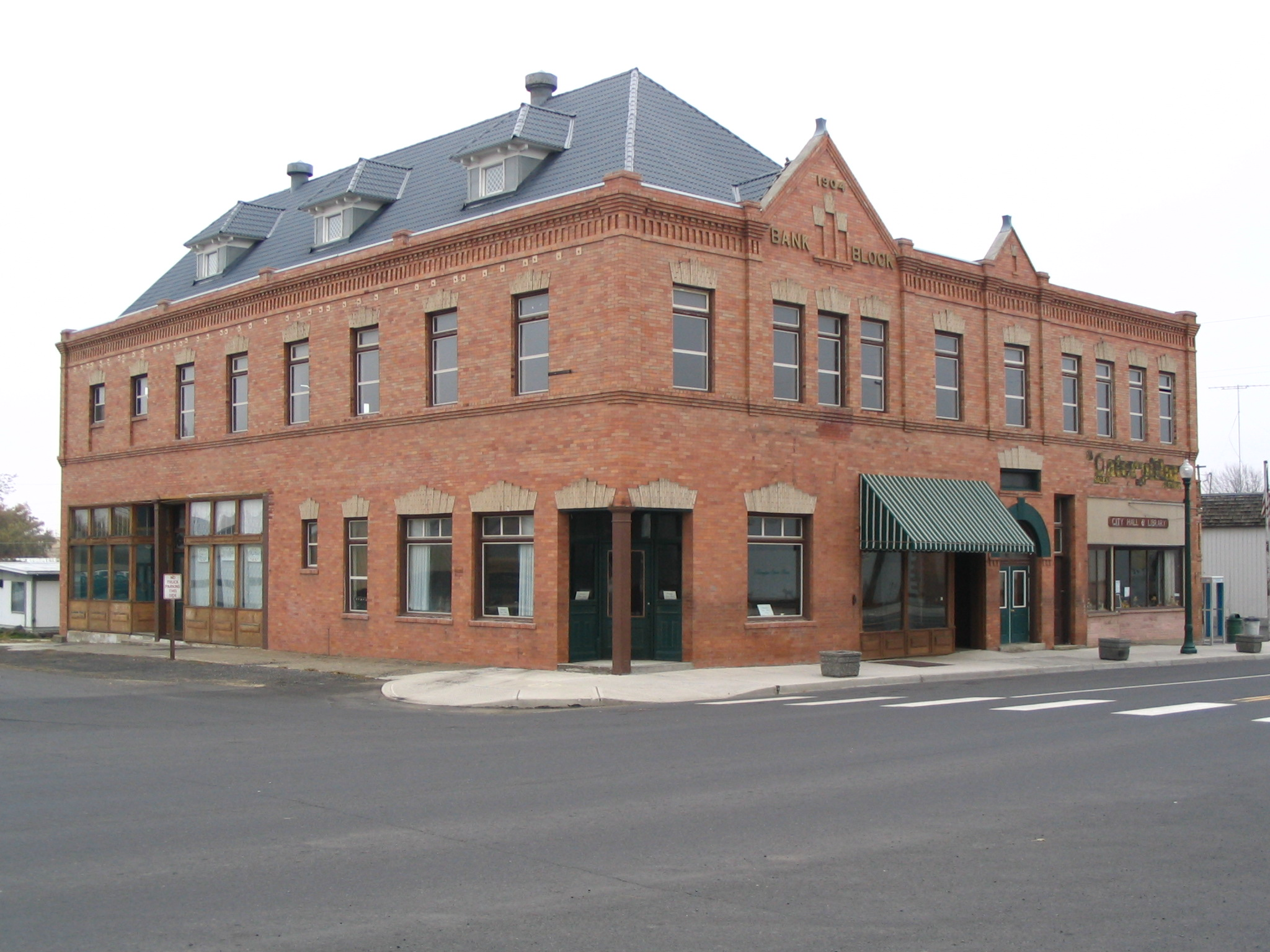
- Harrington Bank Block & Opera House

- Location of Harrington, Washington
- Coordinates: 47°28′49″N 118°15′20″W
- Country: United States
- State: Washington
- County: Lincoln

Government
  - Type: Mayor–council
  - Mayor: Joseph Armand

Area
  - Total: 0.39 sq mi (1.01 km^{2})
  - Land: 0.39 sq mi (1.01 km^{2})
  - Water: 0 sq mi (0.00 km^{2})
- Elevation: 2,146 ft (654 m)

Population (2020)
  - Total: 429
  - Density: 1,100/sq mi (425/km^{2})
- Time zone: UTC-8 (Pacific (PST))
  - Summer (DST): UTC-7 (PDT)
- ZIP codes: 99134, 99154
- Area code: 509
- FIPS code: 53-29745
- GNIS feature ID: 1505401
- Website: www.harrington.city

Harrington is a city in Lincoln County, Washington, United States. The population was 429 at the 2020 census. It was named after W.P. Harrington, a banker from Colusa, California, who had heavily invested in local land.

== History ==
Harrington was first settled in 1879 by Adam Edward Ludy and Jacob Ludy. Harrington was officially incorporated on April 17, 1902.

== Geography ==
Harrington is located at 47°28′49″N 118°15′20″W (47.480251, -118.255422).

According to the United States Census Bureau, the city has a total area of 0.38 square miles (0.98 km^{2}), all of it land.

=== Climate ===
According to the Köppen Climate Classification system, Harrington has a dry-summer Humid continental climate, abbreviated "Dsb" on climate maps.

Climate data for Harrington, Washington (1991–2020 normals, extremes 1961–2020)
Month	Jan	Feb	Mar	Apr	May	Jun	Jul	Aug	Sep	Oct	Nov	Dec	Year
Record high °F (°C)	57 (14)	62 (17)	71 (22)	89 (32)	95 (35)	106 (41)	102 (39)	105 (41)	98 (37)	87 (31)	68 (20)	59 (15)	106 (41)
Mean daily maximum °F (°C)	34.9 (1.6)	40.6 (4.8)	51.0 (10.6)	59.8 (15.4)	68.9 (20.5)	75.4 (24.1)	85.4 (29.7)	85.1 (29.5)	75.9 (24.4)	60.3 (15.7)	44.2 (6.8)	34.3 (1.3)	59.6 (15.3)
Daily mean °F (°C)	28.9 (−1.7)	32.6 (0.3)	40.2 (4.6)	46.3 (7.9)	54.2 (12.3)	59.8 (15.4)	67.1 (19.5)	66.8 (19.3)	59.1 (15.1)	47.1 (8.4)	35.9 (2.2)	28.0 (−2.2)	47.2 (8.4)
Mean daily minimum °F (°C)	22.9 (−5.1)	24.7 (−4.1)	29.3 (−1.5)	32.8 (0.4)	39.5 (4.2)	44.1 (6.7)	48.8 (9.3)	48.6 (9.2)	42.2 (5.7)	33.8 (1.0)	27.7 (−2.4)	21.8 (−5.7)	34.7 (1.5)
Record low °F (°C)	−25 (−32)	−27 (−33)	−1 (−18)	15 (−9)	17 (−8)	24 (−4)	27 (−3)	27 (−3)	19 (−7)	−4 (−20)	−20 (−29)	−25 (−32)	−27 (−33)
Average precipitation inches (mm)	1.59 (40)	1.05 (27)	1.38 (35)	0.97 (25)	1.13 (29)	0.91 (23)	0.37 (9.4)	0.32 (8.1)	0.43 (11)	1.16 (29)	1.54 (39)	1.79 (45)	12.64 (321)
Average snowfall inches (cm)	7.8 (20)	3.3 (8.4)	1.4 (3.6)	0.2 (0.51)	0.0 (0.0)	0.0 (0.0)	0.0 (0.0)	0.0 (0.0)	0.0 (0.0)	0.1 (0.25)	3.4 (8.6)	7.3 (19)	23.5 (60)
Average precipitation days (≥ 0.01 in)	10.4	7.8	9.5	6.8	7.1	5.6	2.8	2.6	3.4	7.0	10.7	10.2	83.9
Average snowy days (≥ 0.1 in)	4.9	2.6	1.7	0.2	0.1	0.0	0.0	0.0	0.0	0.1	2.5	6.0	18.1
Source: NOAA

== Demographics ==
Historical population
Census	Pop.	Note	%±
1910	661		—
1920	882		33.4%
1930	519		−41.2%
1940	545		5.0%
1950	620		13.8%
1960	575		−7.3%
1970	489		−15.0%
1980	507		3.7%
1990	449		−11.4%
2000	426		−5.1%
2010	424		−0.5%
2020	429		1.2%
U.S. Decennial Census; 2020 Census

=== 2020 census ===
As of the 2020 census, Harrington had a population of 429. The median age was 46.3 years. 21.0% of residents were under the age of 18 and 25.6% of residents were 65 years of age or older. For every 100 females there were 92.4 males, and for every 100 females age 18 and over there were 87.3 males age 18 and over.

0.0% of residents lived in urban areas, while 100.0% lived in rural areas.

There were 179 households in Harrington, of which 22.3% had children under the age of 18 living in them. Of all households, 46.9% were married-couple households, 21.2% were households with a male householder and no spouse or partner present, and 25.7% were households with a female householder and no spouse or partner present. About 33.5% of all households were made up of individuals and 19.6% had someone living alone who was 65 years of age or older.

There were 211 housing units, of which 15.2% were vacant. The homeowner vacancy rate was 3.7% and the rental vacancy rate was 3.1%.

Racial composition as of the 2020 census
Race	Number	Percent
White	391	91.1%
Black or African American	0	0.0%
American Indian and Alaska Native	6	1.4%
Asian	5	1.2%
Native Hawaiian and Other Pacific Islander	0	0.0%
Some other race	8	1.9%
Two or more races	19	4.4%
Hispanic or Latino (of any race)	22	5.1%

=== 2010 census ===
As of the 2010 census, there were 424 people, 184 households, and 119 families residing in the city. The population density was 1,115.8 inhabitants per square mile (430.8/km^{2}). There were 219 housing units at an average density of 576.3 units per square mile (222.5 units/km^{2}). The racial makeup of the city was 92.7% White, 0.9% African American, 3.5% Native American, 0.7% from other races, and 2.1% from two or more races. Hispanic or Latino of any race were 2.8% of the population.

There were 184 households, of which 25.0% had children under the age of 18 living with them, 52.2% were married couples living together, 9.2% had a female householder with no husband present, 3.3% had a male householder with no wife present, and 35.3% were non-families. 32.6% of all households were made up of individuals, and 15.2% had someone living alone who was 65 years of age or older. The average household size was 2.30 and the average family size was 2.87.

The median age in the city was 46.1 years. 22.4% of residents were under the age of 18; 5.9% were between the ages of 18 and 24; 18.9% were from 25 to 44; 29.2% were from 45 to 64; and 23.6% were 65 years of age or older. The gender makeup of the city was 47.4% male and 52.6% female.

=== 2000 census ===
As of the 2000 census, there were 426 people, 187 households, and 115 families residing in the city. The population density was 1,122.2 people per square mile (433.3 people/km^{2}). There were 235 housing units at an average density of 619.1 units per square mile (239.0 units/km^{2}). The racial makeup of the city was 97.18% White, 1.41% Native American, 0.23% Asian, and 1.17% from two or more races. Hispanic or Latino of any race were 0.94% of the population

There were 187 households, out of which 27.3% had children under the age of 18 living with them, 51.9% were married couples living together, 7.0% had a female householder with no husband present, and 38.0% were non-families. 36.4% of all households were made up of individuals, and 15.0% had someone living alone who was 65 years of age or older. The average household size was 2.25 and the average family size was 2.92

In the city, the population was spread out, with 25.6% under the age of 18, 4.2% from 18 to 24, 22.3% from 25 to 44, 25.1% from 45 to 64, and 22.8% who were 65 years of age or older. The median age was 43 years. For every 100 females, there were 100.0 males. For every 100 females age 18 and over, there were 98.1 males

The median income for a household in the city was $29,792, and the median income for a family was $45,000. Males had a median income of $30,625 versus $16,563 for females. The per capita income for the city was $17,744. About 3.8% of families and 12.0% of the population were below the poverty line, including 7.7% of those under age 18 and 7.7% of those age 65 or over

== Notable people ==
- Darol Froman, physicist
- George Frederick McKay, classical music composer, was born in Harrington in 1899.
- Robert D. Timm, Washington state legislator

== See also ==
- Harrington Bank Block & Opera House
