= Monmouth Courthouse Commercial Historic District =

Historic district in Illinois, United States

- U.S. National Register of Historic Places
- U.S. Historic district
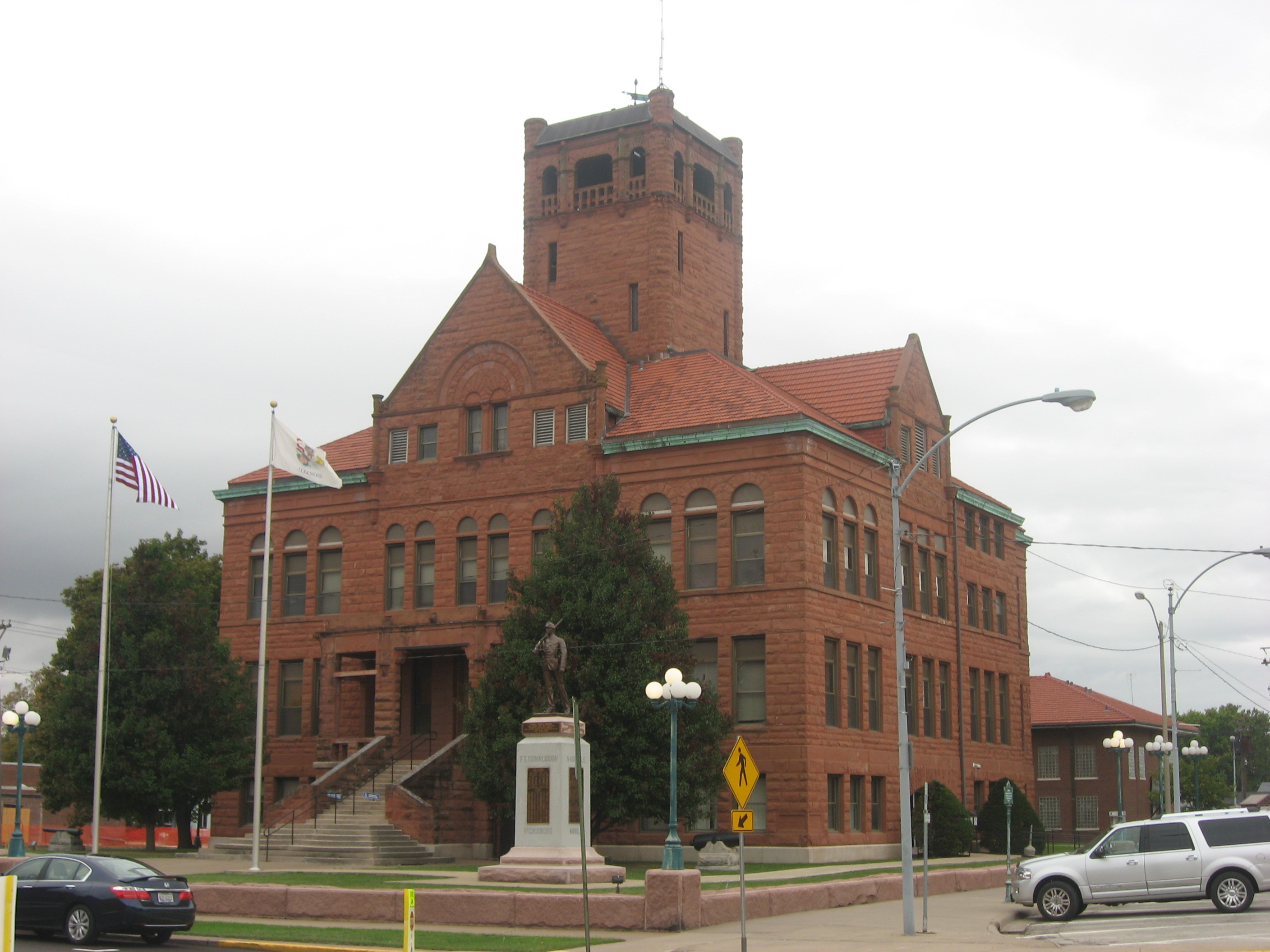
- The Warren County Courthouse

- Location within Illinois Location within the United States
- Location: Roughly bounded by Archer, Ave., First St., Second Ave. and A St., Monmouth, Illinois
- Coordinates: 40°54′43″N 90°38′54″W
- Area: 30 acres (12 ha)
- Built: 1871
- Architectural style: Italianate, Queen Anne, Romanesque, Classical Revival, Commercial, Art Deco, Moderne
- NRHP reference No.: 05001604
- Added to NRHP: February 1, 2006

The Monmouth Courthouse Commercial Historic District is a historic district located in downtown Monmouth, Illinois. The district encompasses Monmouth's historic commercial core and includes 63 contributing buildings and sites, most of them commercial buildings. Growth in the district began in the 1850s and continued through the 1920s, with occasional spurts in between due to rebuilding after fires. The Public Square, a small park within a roundabout, serves as the anchor of the district; the Warren County Courthouse, a Richardsonian Romanesque building completed in 1895, is its namesake building. Most of the commercial buildings within the district have Italianate or Commercial Style designs, with the former style generally predating the latter. Examples of the Queen Anne, Classical Revival, Art Deco, and Moderne styles can also be seen in the district.

The district was added to the National Register of Historic Places on February 1, 2006.
