= Monmouth, Illinois =

- City
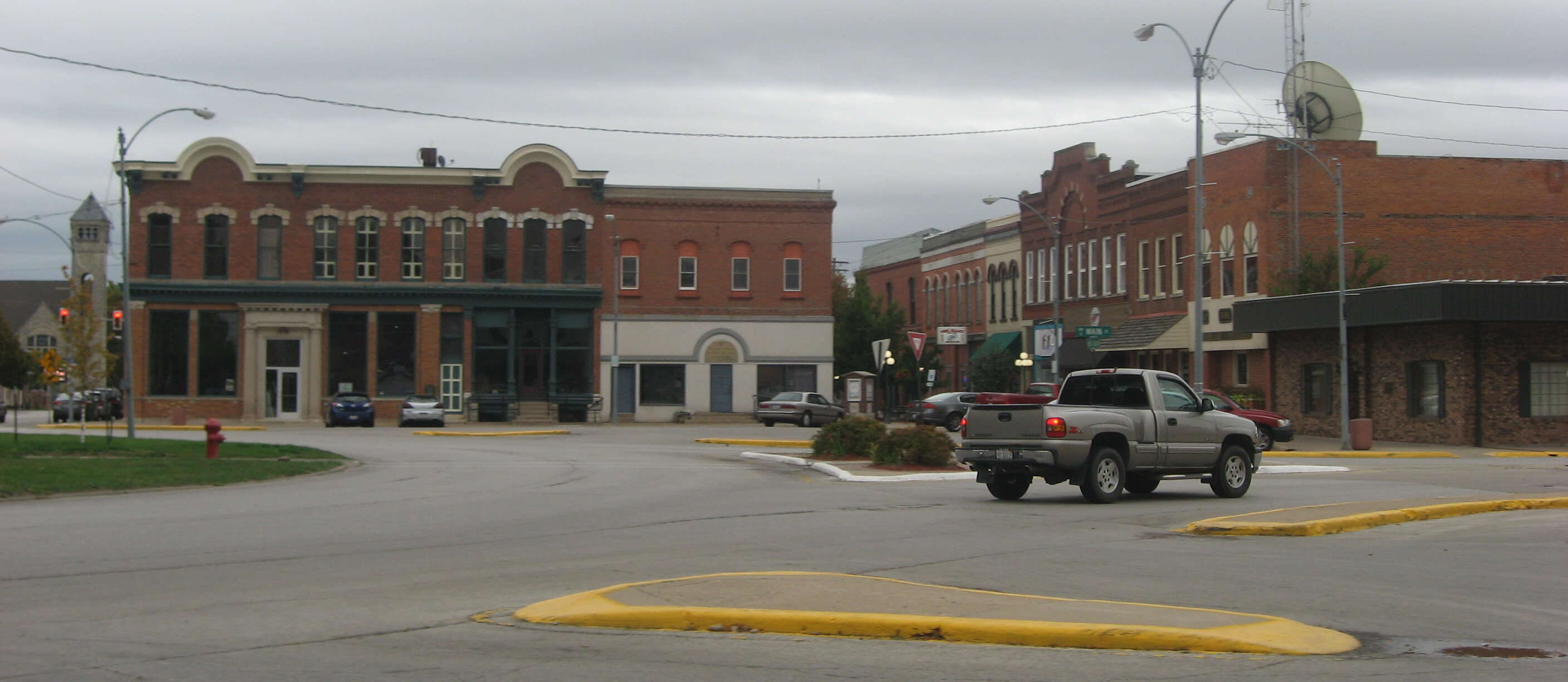
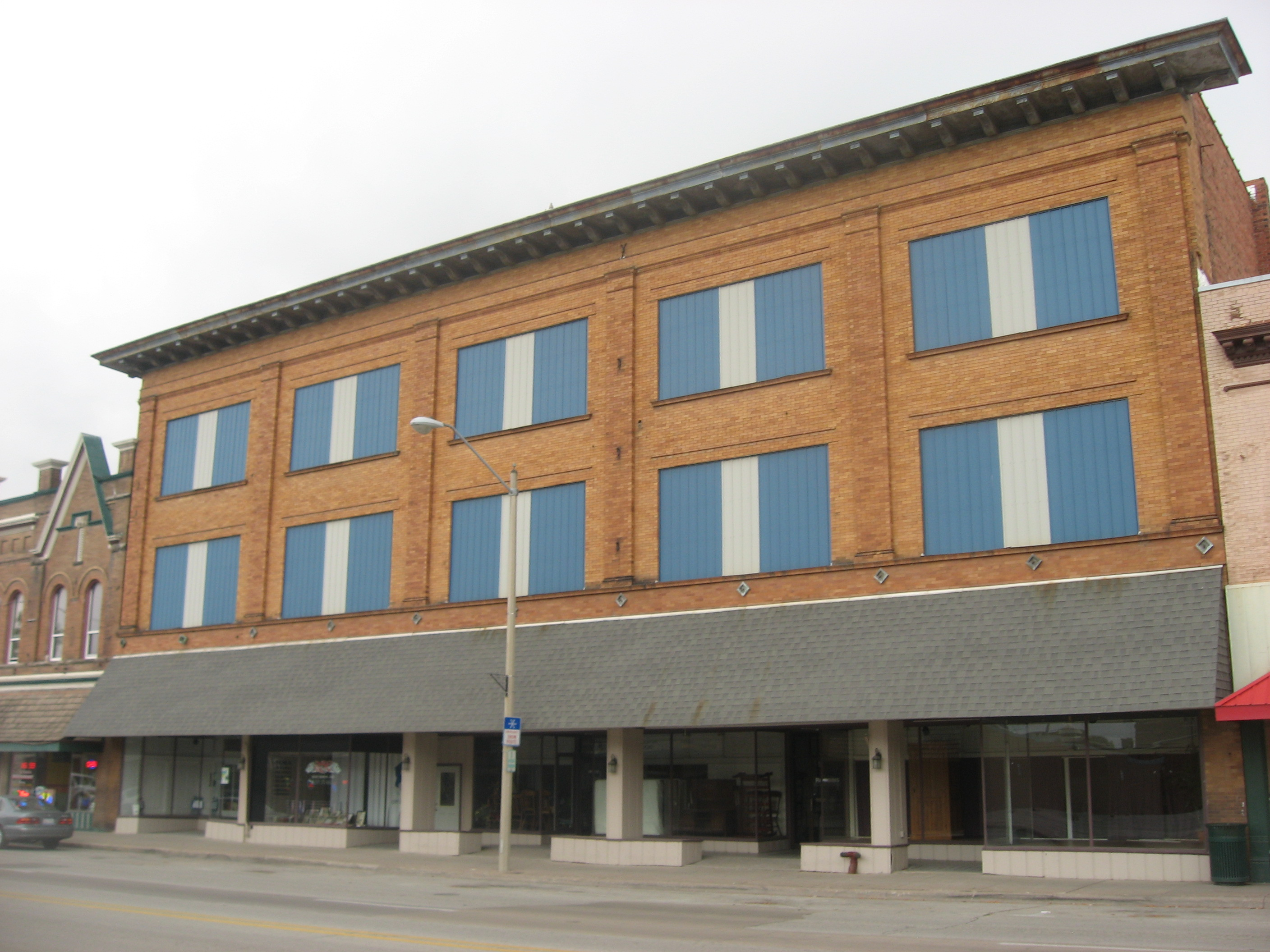
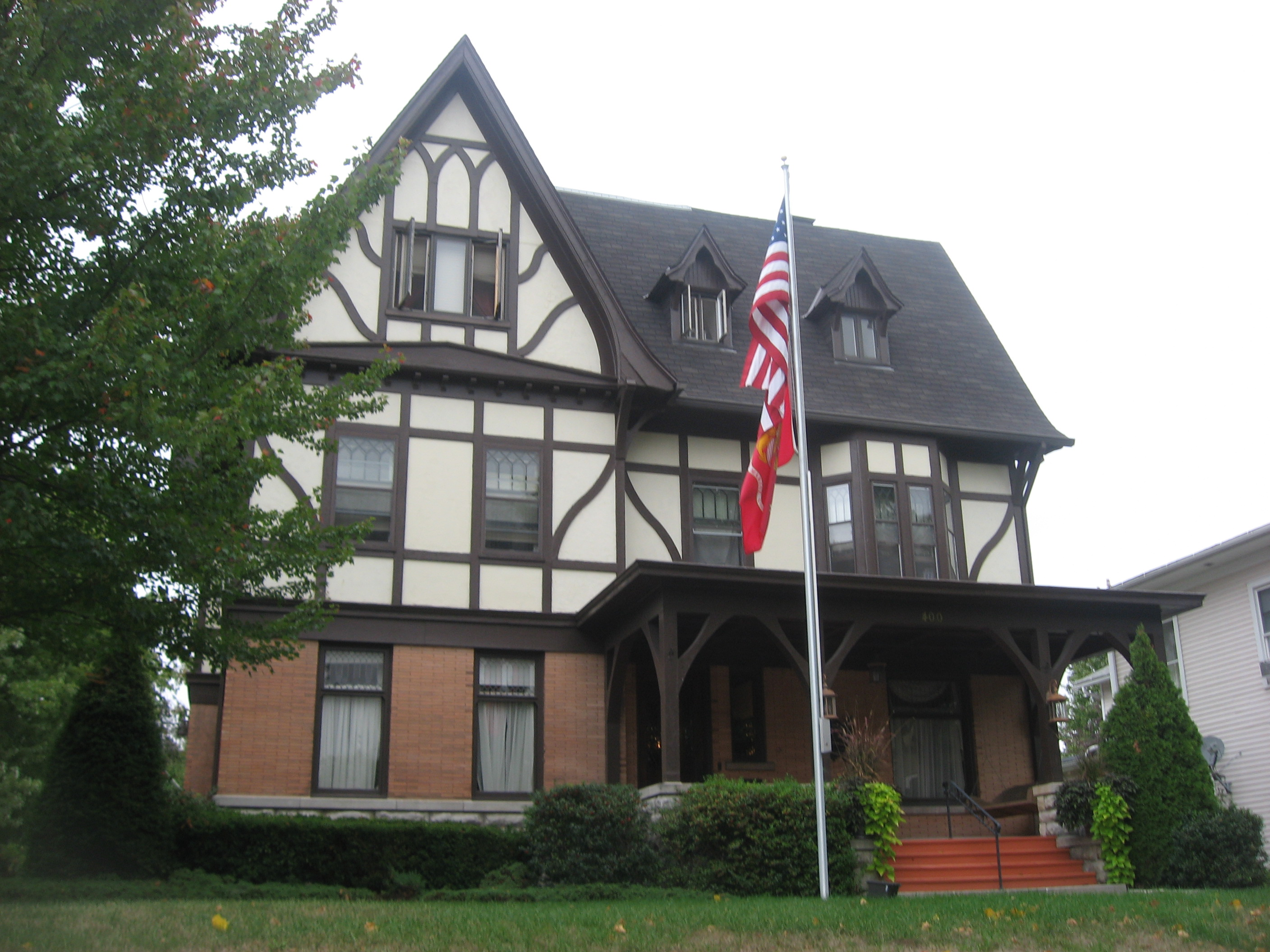
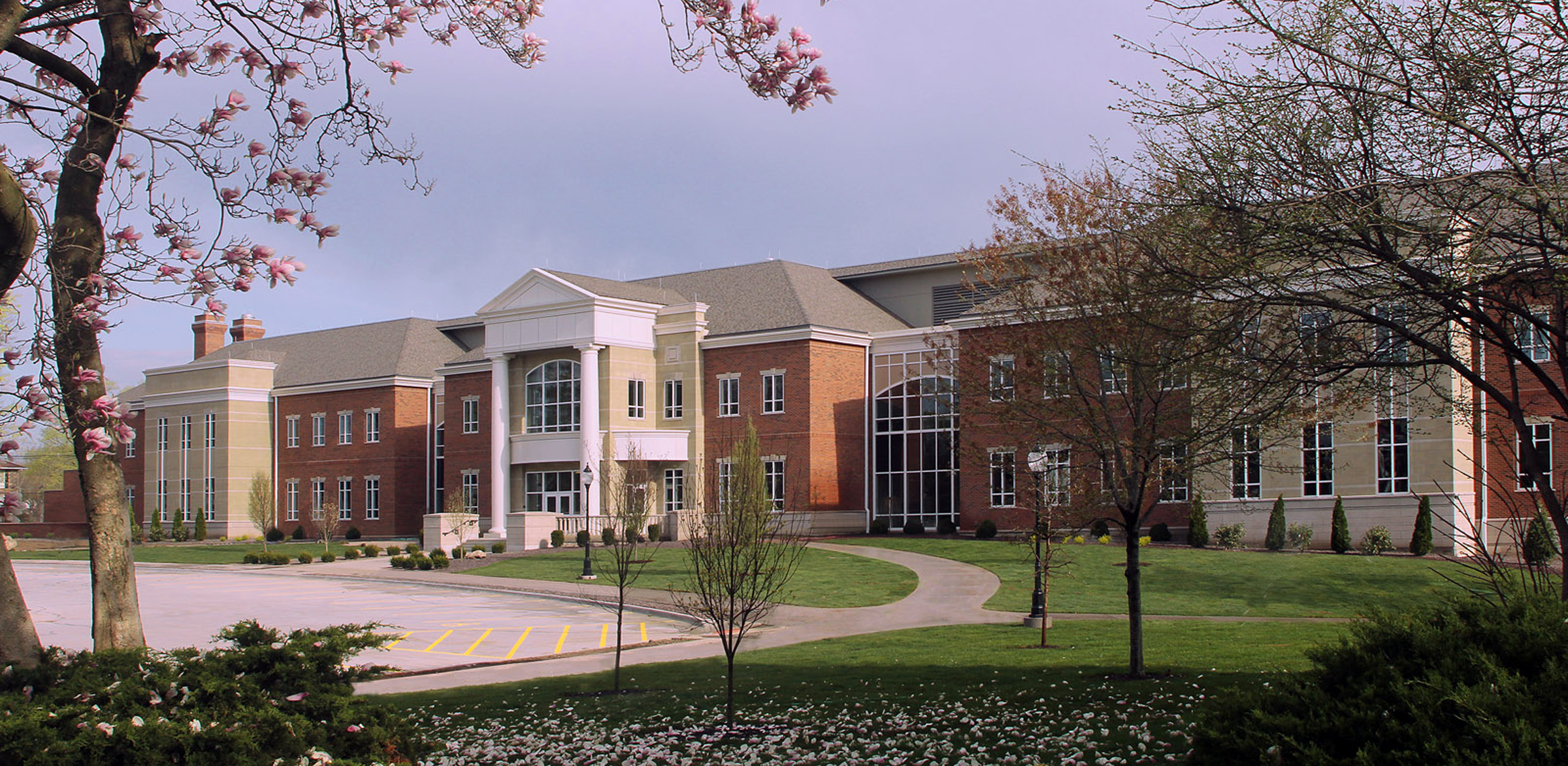
- Monmouth Courthouse Historic District E. B. Colwell Department Store William S. Weir, Jr. House Monmouth College
- Nickname: The Maple City
- Motto: Make it Monmouth!
- Interactive map of Monmouth, Illinois
- Location within Illinois Location within the United States
- Coordinates: 40°54′50″N 90°38′33″W
- Country: United States
- State: Illinois
- County: Warren
- Township: Monmouth

Area
  - Total: 4.26 sq mi (11.04 km^{2})
  - Land: 4.24 sq mi (10.99 km^{2})
  - Water: 0.019 sq mi (0.05 km^{2})
- Elevation: 751 ft (229 m)

Population (2020)
  - Total: 8,902
  - Density: 2,098.7/sq mi (810.31/km^{2})
- Time zone: UTC-6 (CST)
  - Summer (DST): UTC-5 (CDT)
- ZIP Code(s): 61462
- Area code: 309
- FIPS code: 17-50010
- GNIS feature ID: 2395371
- Wikimedia Commons: Monmouth, Illinois
- Website: www.cityofmonmouth.com

Monmouth is a city in and the county seat of Warren County, Illinois, United States. The population was 8,902 at the 2020 census, down from 9,444 in 2010. It is the home of Monmouth College.

Local parks and institutions located within Monmouth include Monmouth Park, Harmon Park, North Park, Warfield Park, West Park, South Park, Garwood Park, Buster White Park and the Citizens Lake & Campground. It is the host of the Prime Beef festival, held annually the week after Labor Day. The festival is kicked off with one of the largest parades in Western Illinois. Monmouth is also known regionally as the "Maple City". It is part of the Galesburg Micropolitan Statistical Area.

== History ==
Monmouth was settled in about 1824. The town established in 1831 was originally going to be called Kosciusko (the name was drawn out of a hat), but the founders of the town feared that it would be difficult to spell and pronounce. The name 'Monmouth' was put forward by a resident who had lived in Monmouth County, New Jersey.

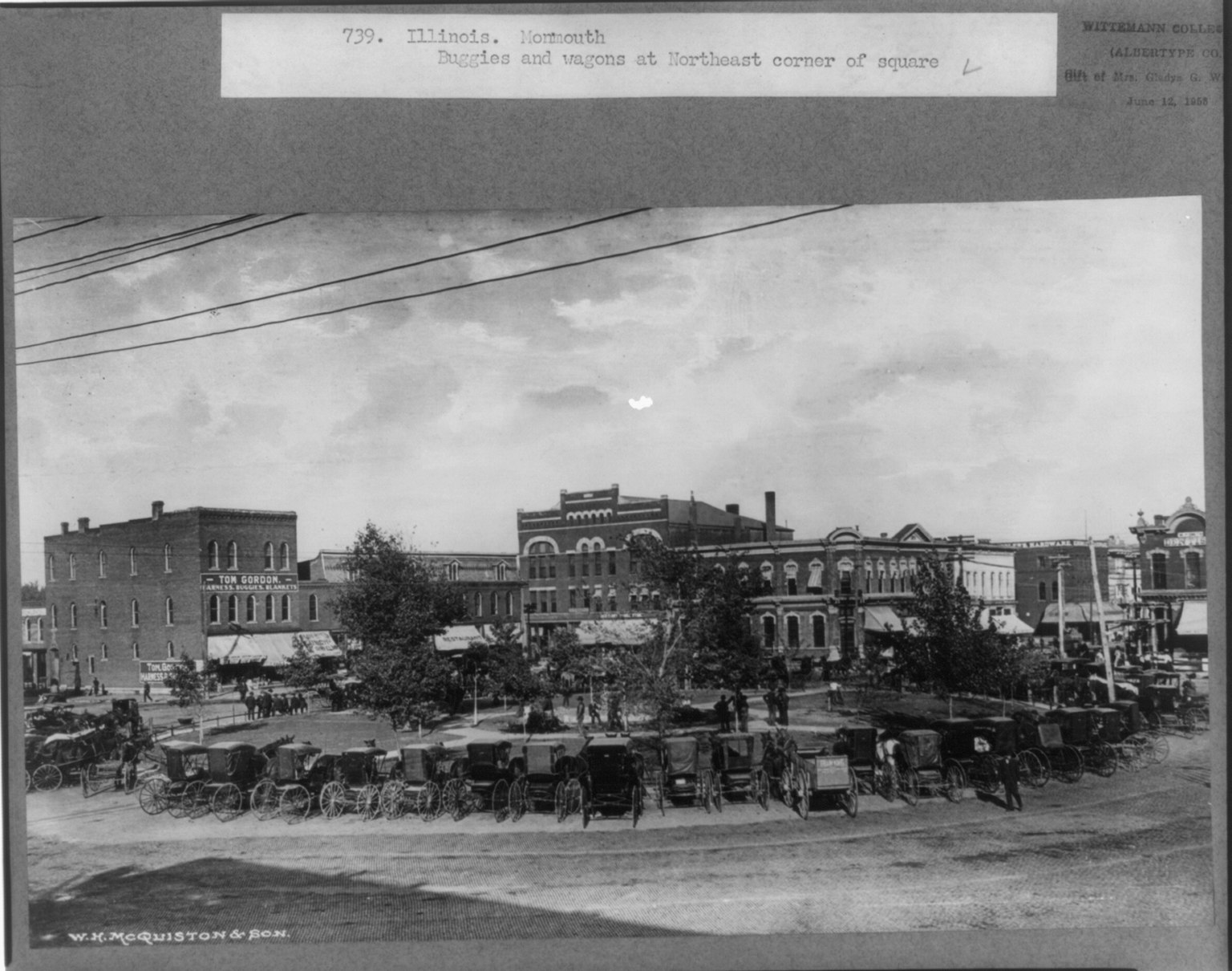
Buggies and wagons at the northeast corner of the city square in 1890

In 1841, Latter Day Saint movement founder Joseph Smith appeared before Judge Stephen A. Douglas in an extradition hearing held at Monmouth's Warren County courthouse. The hearing, which was to determine whether Smith should be returned to Missouri to face murder charges, resulted in freedom for the defendant, as it was determined that his arrest had been invalid. Attorney Orville Browning, who would assume Douglas's Senate seat following his death, represented Smith.

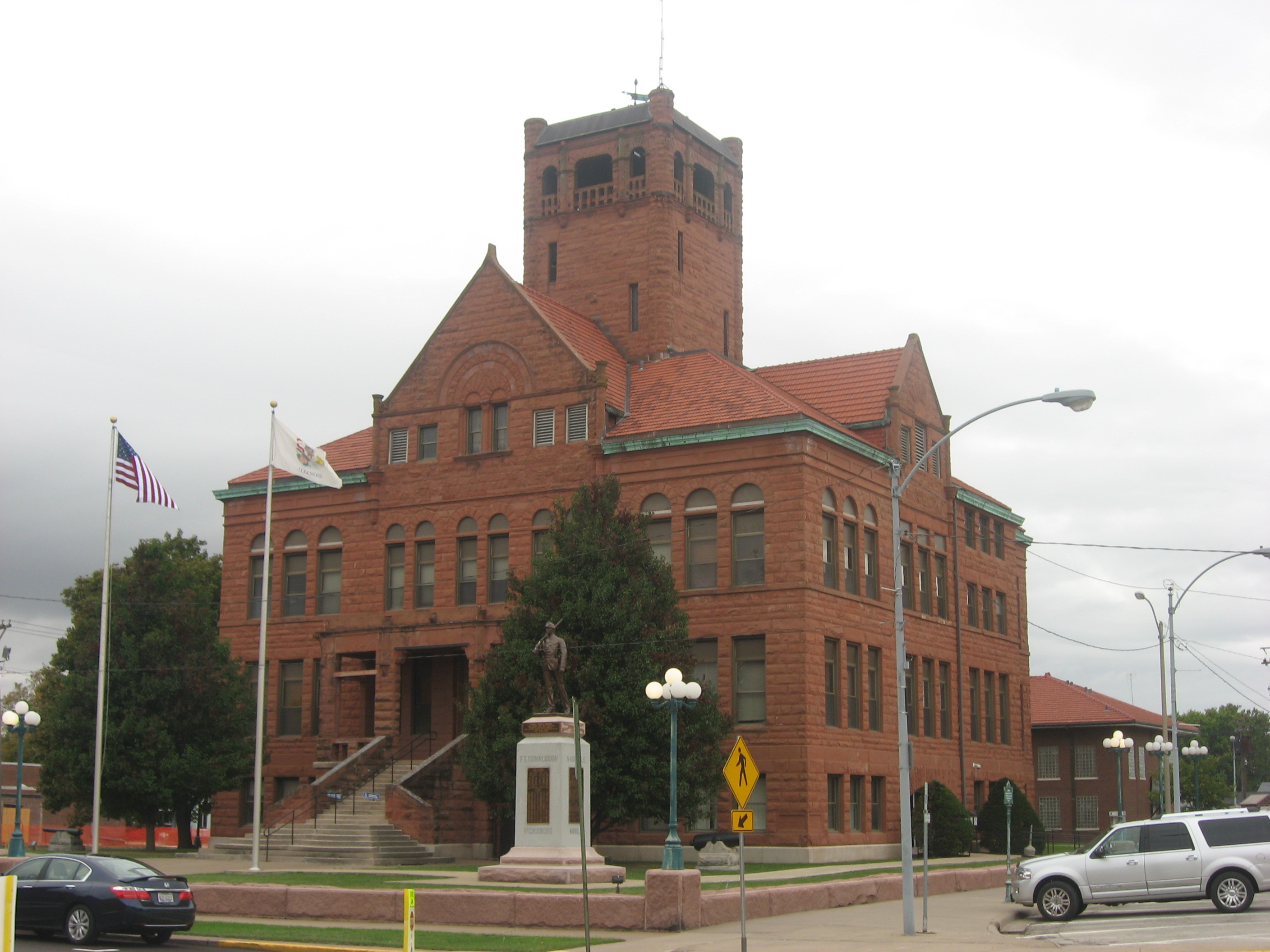
Warren County Courthouse (built 1895), within the Monmouth Courthouse Commercial Historic District (2013 photo)

Gunfighter and law man Wyatt Earp was born in Monmouth. Controversial Civil War general Eleazer A. Paine practiced law there for many years. Abner C. Harding, Civil War General and Republican Congressman, lived in Monmouth and is buried in Monmouth Cemetery. Ronald Reagan lived in Monmouth for a while as a child when his father worked as a shoe salesman at the Colwell Department Store. Mass murderer Richard Speck lived in Monmouth briefly as a child, and again in the spring of 1966.

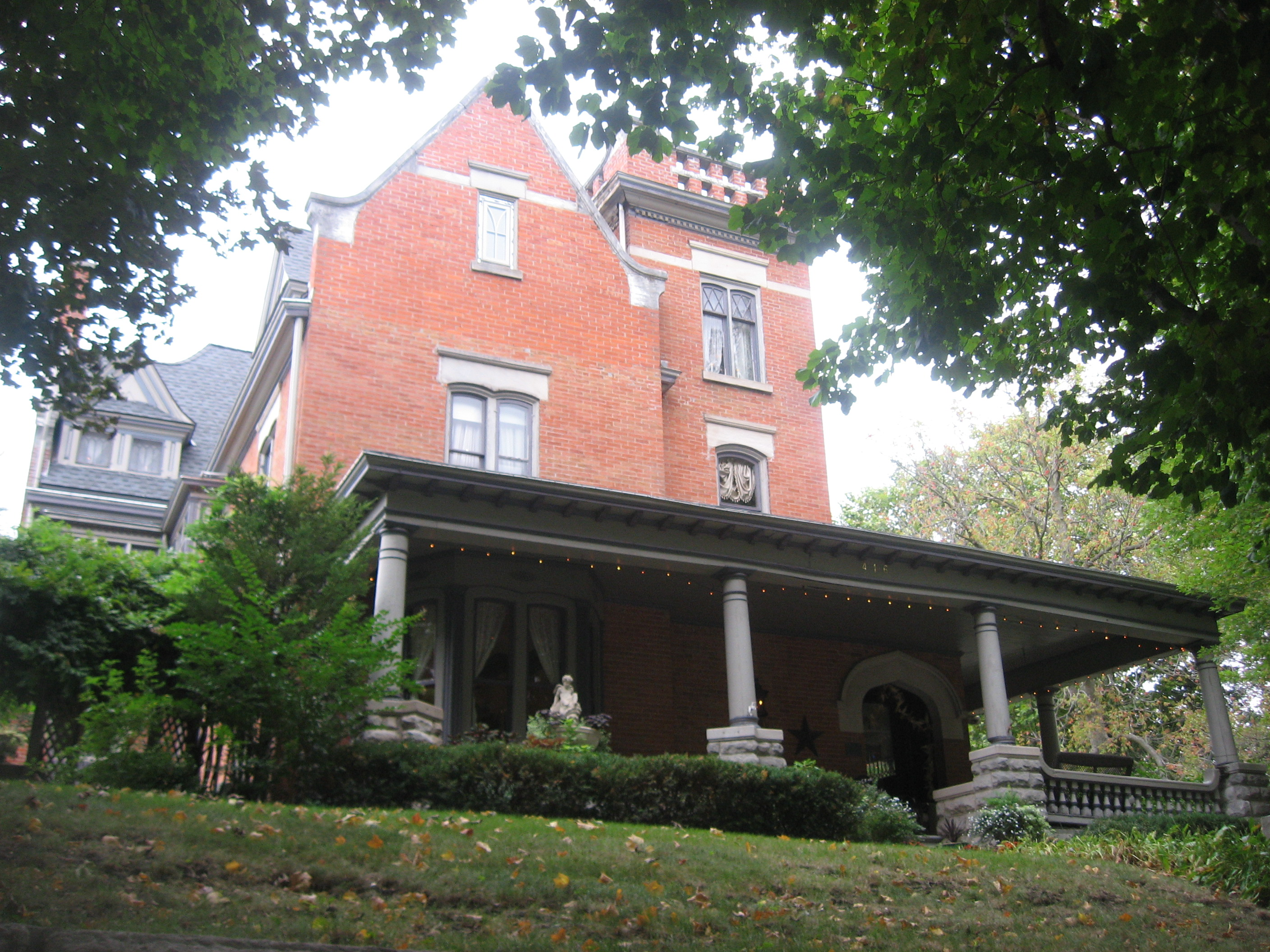
Carr Mansion, built in 1877, is one of many structures listed on the National Register of Historic Places in Monmouth.

Monmouth College, a private liberal arts college affiliated with the Presbyterian Church (U.S.A.), was founded in Monmouth in 1853 by Cedar Creek & South Henderson Presbyterian Churches. With James Cochran Porter & Robert Ross founding in 1852 Monmouth Academy, The Rev. David Alexander Wallace served as the first President 1856–1878. It is the second-largest employer in the city. Pi Beta Phi, the first national secret college society of women to be modeled after the Greek-letter fraternities of men, was founded on its campus in 1867. Just three years later in 1870, Kappa Kappa Gamma, international fraternity for women, was founded on its campus.

Monmouth was home to minor league baseball from 1890 to 1913. The Monmouth Browns and Monmouth Maple Cities (1890) played as members of the Central Association (1910–1913), Illinois-Missouri League (1908–1909), Central Interstate League (1889) and Illinois-Iowa League (1890). Monmouth teams played at 11th Street Park.

A hospital is located in Monmouth.

Monmouth was once home to one of the most unusually named high school sports organizations, the Zippers. Originally known as The Maroons, the Zipper nickname came about in the late 1930s when the school had a fast basketball team that would "Zip" up and down the court. Earl Bennett, a sportswriter nicknamed them "The Zippers" and the name stuck. The school went with the "Zipper" nickname until the 2004–2005 school year when Monmouth consolidated with Roseville and the new Monmouth-Roseville High School adopted the nickname "The Titans". The class of 2005 was the last class named the Zippers. The Class of 2006 was the first class named the Titans.

Monmouth was the home of Western Stoneware, known for its "Maple Leaf" imprint and for producing "Sleepy Eye" collectible ceramics, which are recognizable by the blue-on-white bas-relief Indian profile. Western Stoneware closed in June 2006. Three former employees of Western Stoneware now operate the facility under the name "WS", Incorporated and have leased the building and logo from the city of Monmouth.

== Geography ==
Monmouth is located in Western Illinois where US Route 34, US Route 67, Illinois Route 164, and now the new Chicago to Kansas City Expressway (Illinois Route 110) intersect.

According to the 2010 census, Monmouth has a total area of 4.231 square miles (10.96 km^{2}), of which 4.21 square miles (10.90 km^{2}) (or 99.5%) is land and 0.021 square miles (0.05 km^{2}) (or 0.5%) is water.

=== Climate ===
Climate data for Monmouth, Illinois (1991–2020 normals, extremes 1893–present)
Month	Jan	Feb	Mar	Apr	May	Jun	Jul	Aug	Sep	Oct	Nov	Dec	Year
Record high °F (°C)	69 (21)	79 (26)	88 (31)	93 (34)	102 (39)	104 (40)	110 (43)	105 (41)	103 (39)	93 (34)	82 (28)	73 (23)	110 (43)
Mean daily maximum °F (°C)	31.4 (−0.3)	36.2 (2.3)	49.7 (9.8)	62.8 (17.1)	72.9 (22.7)	81.2 (27.3)	84.1 (28.9)	82.8 (28.2)	77.3 (25.2)	64.8 (18.2)	49.2 (9.6)	36.5 (2.5)	60.7 (15.9)
Daily mean °F (°C)	23.1 (−4.9)	27.5 (−2.5)	39.4 (4.1)	51.3 (10.7)	61.9 (16.6)	70.8 (21.6)	73.8 (23.2)	72.2 (22.3)	65.4 (18.6)	53.5 (11.9)	39.9 (4.4)	28.6 (−1.9)	50.6 (10.3)
Mean daily minimum °F (°C)	14.7 (−9.6)	18.7 (−7.4)	29.1 (−1.6)	39.7 (4.3)	50.9 (10.5)	60.3 (15.7)	63.6 (17.6)	61.5 (16.4)	53.6 (12.0)	42.2 (5.7)	30.6 (−0.8)	20.8 (−6.2)	40.5 (4.7)
Record low °F (°C)	−25 (−32)	−27 (−33)	−14 (−26)	10 (−12)	25 (−4)	33 (1)	43 (6)	38 (3)	18 (−8)	7 (−14)	−4 (−20)	−22 (−30)	−27 (−33)
Average precipitation inches (mm)	1.85 (47)	1.98 (50)	2.61 (66)	3.95 (100)	5.18 (132)	4.53 (115)	3.96 (101)	3.92 (100)	3.70 (94)	3.01 (76)	2.58 (66)	2.15 (55)	39.42 (1,001)
Average snowfall inches (cm)	8.7 (22)	6.1 (15)	3.3 (8.4)	1.1 (2.8)	0.0 (0.0)	0.0 (0.0)	0.0 (0.0)	0.0 (0.0)	0.0 (0.0)	0.2 (0.51)	1.4 (3.6)	4.8 (12)	25.6 (65)
Average precipitation days (≥ 0.01 in)	7.0	6.6	8.1	9.9	11.8	9.6	8.3	8.4	6.9	7.9	7.3	6.7	98.5
Average snowy days (≥ 0.1 in)	3.7	3.4	1.3	0.2	0.0	0.0	0.0	0.0	0.0	0.1	0.9	2.9	12.5
Source: NOAA

== Demographics ==
Historical population
Census	Pop.	Note	%±
1850	797		—
1860	2,506		214.4%
1870	4,662		86.0%
1880	5,000		7.3%
1890	5,936		18.7%
1900	7,460		25.7%
1910	9,128		22.4%
1920	8,116		−11.1%
1930	8,666		6.8%
1940	9,096		5.0%
1950	10,193		12.1%
1960	10,372		1.8%
1970	11,022		6.3%
1980	10,706		−2.9%
1990	9,489		−11.4%
2000	9,841		3.7%
2010	9,444		−4.0%
2020	8,902		−5.7%
U.S. Decennial Census

=== Racial and ethnic composition ===
Monmouth city, Illinois – Racial and ethnic composition Note: the US Census treats Hispanic/Latino as an ethnic category. This table excludes Latinos from the racial categories and assigns them to a separate category. Hispanics/Latinos may be of any race.
Race / Ethnicity (NH = Non-Hispanic)	Pop 2000	Pop 2010	Pop 2020	% 2000	% 2010	% 2020
White alone (NH)	8,940	7,576	6,122	90.84%	80.22%	68.77%
Black or African American alone (NH)	274	258	537	2.78%	2.73%	6.03%
Native American or Alaska Native alone (NH)	20	22	11	0.20%	0.23%	0.12%
Asian alone (NH)	44	65	300	0.45%	0.69%	3.37%
Native Hawaiian or Pacific Islander alone (NH)	17	4	9	0.17%	0.04%	0.10%
Other race alone (NH)	6	7	27	0.06%	0.07%	0.30%
Mixed race or Multiracial (NH)	112	154	310	1.14%	1.63%	3.48%
Hispanic or Latino (any race)	428	1,358	1,586	4.35%	14.38%	17.82%
Total	9,841	9,444	8,902	100.00%	100.00%	100.00%

=== 2020 census ===
As of the 2020 census, Monmouth had a population of 8,902. The median age was 35.7 years. 22.2% of residents were under the age of 18 and 17.7% of residents were 65 years of age or older. For every 100 females there were 94.9 males, and for every 100 females age 18 and over there were 93.2 males age 18 and over.

100.0% of residents lived in urban areas, while 0.0% lived in rural areas.

There were 3,388 households in Monmouth, of which 28.6% had children under the age of 18 living in them. Of all households, 40.2% were married-couple households, 21.3% were households with a male householder and no spouse or partner present, and 31.4% were households with a female householder and no spouse or partner present. About 36.7% of all households were made up of individuals and 18.2% had someone living alone who was 65 years of age or older.

There were 3,766 housing units, of which 10.0% were vacant. The homeowner vacancy rate was 2.7% and the rental vacancy rate was 9.6%.

Racial composition as of the 2020 census
Race	Number	Percent
White	6,402	71.9%
Black or African American	546	6.1%
American Indian and Alaska Native	46	0.5%
Asian	301	3.4%
Native Hawaiian and Other Pacific Islander	11	0.1%
Some other race	859	9.6%
Two or more races	737	8.3%
Hispanic or Latino (of any race)	1,586	17.8%

=== 2000 census ===
As of the census of 2000, there were 9,841 people, 3,688 households, and 2,323 families residing in the city. The population density was 2,442.3 inhabitants per square mile (943.0/km^{2}). There were 3,986 housing units at an average density of 989.2 per square mile (381.9/km^{2}). The racial makeup of the city was 92.72% White, 2.80% African American, 0.23% Native American, 0.47% Asian, 0.19% Pacific Islander, 1.91% from other races, and 1.67% from two or more races. Hispanic or Latino of any race were 4.35% of the population.

There were 3,688 households, out of which 29.6% had children under the age of 18 living with them, 47.7% were married couples living together, 11.5% had a female householder with no husband present, and 37.0% were non-families. 32.1% of all households were made up of individuals, and 14.9% had someone living alone who was 65 years of age or older. The average household size was 2.37 and the average family size was 2.99.

In the city the population was spread out, with 23.0% under the age of 18, 17.1% from 18 to 24, 24.1% from 25 to 44, 20.3% from 45 to 64, and 15.5% who were 65 years of age or older. The median age was 34 years. For every 100 females, there were 88.5 males. For every 100 females age 18 and over, there were 85.3 males.

The median income for a household in the city was $33,641, and the median income for a family was $41,004. Males had a median income of $30,006 versus $20,144 for females. The per capita income for the city was $15,839. About 8.0% of families and 11.1% of the population were below the poverty line, including 14.5% of those under age 18 and 6.1% of those age 65 or over.

== Transportation ==
Burlington Trailways provides intercity bus service to the city on a route between Indianapolis and Denver.

== Media ==
=== Radio ===
- WMOI-FM (97.7) (RDS) Format: Adult Contemporary
- WRAM-AM (1330)/FM (94.1) Format: News/Talk/Ag Classic Country Music
- WPFS (105.9) "Proud Fighting Scots Radio" Format: Monmouth College Radio
- WKAY-FM (105.3) "Today's Refreshing Light Rock"
- WAAG-FM (94.9) "The Country Station"
- WLSR-FM (92.7) "Pure Rock The Laser"
- WGIL-AM (1400/93.7 FM) "News, Talk, Sports"

=== Newspaper ===
- Daily Review Atlas
- Penny Saver

== Culture ==
=== Museums and Galleries ===
- The Warren County History Museum
- The Buchanan Center for the Arts
- Holt House (Pi Beta Phi founding house museum)
- Stewart House (Kappa Kappa Gamma founding house museum)

== Education ==
The majority of the city limits is in the Monmouth-Roseville Community Unit School District 238. Some parts to the north are in the United Community School District 304.

== Notable people ==
- John Clayton Allen – U.S. Congressman from Illinois from 1925 to 1933
- George A. Beecher – bishop of Western Nebraska
- Ken Blackman – Former NFL football player for the Cincinnati Bengals & Tampa Bay Buccaneers. Grew up in Monmouth.
- Clarence F. Buck – Illinois state senator, farmer, postmaster, and newspaper editor
- Montgomery Case – bridge builder
- Ellen Irene Diggs – American anthropologist and author of African-American history. Born and raised in Monmouth
- Charles Dryden – early 20th Century sportswriter
- Jug Earp – NFL football player from 1921 to 1932
- Wyatt Earp – legendary lawman of the American West; born in Monmouth
- Loie Fuller – pioneer of modern dance
- Gladys Gale – singer and actress
- Ralph Greenleaf – nineteen-time world pocket billiards (Straight Pool) champion (1919–1938) in Hall of Fame
- Regis Groff – second African American elected to the Colorado Senate, lived in Monmouth as a child
- J. P. Machado – former NFL football player for the New York Jets
- Mike Miller – basketball coach
- Loren E. Murphy – Chief Justice of the Illinois Supreme Court and mayor of Monmouth
- Eleazer A. Paine – Civil War general, lived in Monmouth
- Ronald Reagan – 40th President of the United States, lived in Monmouth as a child
- James Montgomery Rice – Illinois Congressman, helped establish United States National Guard
- James H. Rupp – Illinois state senator, Mayor of Monmouth, and businessman
- Richard Speck – mass murderer, briefly lived in Monmouth
- Lawrence H. Stice – Illinois state representative and businessman, lived in Monmouth
- John Twomey – manualist
- Dan Everett Waid – architect, moved to Monmouth at age 14
- J. Mayo Williams – pro football player, music producer in Blues Hall of Fame; grew up in Monmouth

== See also ==
- List of photographs of Abraham Lincoln
