= U.S. Route 34 in Iowa =

Highway in Iowa, United States

U.S. Highway 34
- US 34 highlighted in red

Route information
- Maintained by Iowa DOT
- Length: 269.111 mi (433.092 km)
- Existed: July 1, 1926–present

Major junctions
- West end: US 34 near Glenwood
- I-29 near Glenwood; US 59 near Emerson; US 71 near Villisca; US 169 at Afton; I-35 at Osceola; US 65 at Lucas; US 63 / Iowa 163 at Ottumwa; US 218 / Iowa 27 at Mount Pleasant; US 61 in Burlington
- East end: US 34 at Burlington

Location
- Country: United States
- State: Iowa
- Counties: Mills; Montgomery; Adams; Union; Clarke; Lucas; Monroe; Wapello; Jefferson; Henry; Des Moines

Highway system
- United States Numbered Highway System; List; Special; Divided; Iowa Primary Highway System; Interstate; US; State; Secondary; Scenic
← Iowa 33	→ I-35

U.S. Highway 34 (US 34) is a United States Highway that runs across the southern third of Iowa. It begins on a bridge over the Missouri River west of Glenwood and travels east, where it meets Interstate 29 (I-29) and US 275. Through southwestern Iowa, the highway is mostly a two-lane rural road with at-grade intersections, though there are interchanges with US 59 near Emerson and US 71 near Stanton and Villisca. At Osceola, the highway intersects I-35 and US 69. Just east of Ottumwa, where the road meets US 63, it joins the four-lane Iowa 163 for the remainder of its route through the state. At Mount Pleasant, it overlaps US 218 and Iowa 27, the Avenue of the Saints Highway. From there, the road heads southeast, crossing the Mississippi River on the Great River Bridge at Burlington.

US 34 was one of the original U.S. Highways when the system was created in 1926, though it was preceded by the Blue Grass Route, a 310-mile-long (500 km) auto trail that connected Council Bluffs and Burlington. In 1920, the Iowa State Highway Commission (ISHC) assigned route numbers to roads to improve wayfinding for travelers. The Blue Grass Route was assigned Primary Road No. 8 in its entirety. Six years later, No. 8 was redesignated a part of U.S. Highway 34. In 1930, the highway became the first road to be fully paved across the state. By the 1950s, increased traffic and larger, faster automobiles rendered the original pavement inadequate, leading to straightening and widening projects.

Starting in the 1960s, parts of the route were expanded to four lanes. A section of controlled-access highway was built in Burlington, and a limited-access highway was constructed in Glenwood. During construction in Glenwood, Native American remains were discovered. The subsequent lab analysis and delayed reburial created controversy that eventually contributed to the Native American Graves Protection and Repatriation Act. In the 1990s and 2000s, the highway between Ottumwa and West Burlington was widened to four lanes as part of a project to improve the corridor between Des Moines and Burlington. Since the early 1990s, narrow toll bridges at both the eastern and western state lines were replaced by modern, toll-free bridges capable of handling high volumes of traffic.

== Route description ==
U.S. Highway 34 extends across Iowa from west to east through the southern third of the state. It enters the state by crossing the Missouri River near Glenwood and exits over the Mississippi River on the Great River Bridge in Burlington. The majority of the highway follows a two-lane road over the southern Iowa drift plain. The eastern third of the route is a four-lane expressway; part of a corridor between Des Moines and Burlington. In the early 1990s, the Iowa Department of Transportation (Iowa DOT) designated the entire length of US 34 as the Red Bull Highway, in honor of the 34th Infantry Division.

=== Western Iowa ===
US 34 enters Iowa on a bridge over the Missouri River near the mouth of the Platte River. It follows a four-lane expressway that shortly intersects Interstate 29 (I-29) and US 275. The latter highway joins US 34 from the north and the two highways travel together through Glenwood. The County Road L35 (CR L35) exit in southern Glenwood was, prior to 2003, the western end of the concurrency with US 275. A few miles east of town, the highway reduces to two lanes and US 275 diverges to the south. Continuing east, US 34 briefly curves to the north and passes over the BNSF Railway line that carries the California Zephyr.

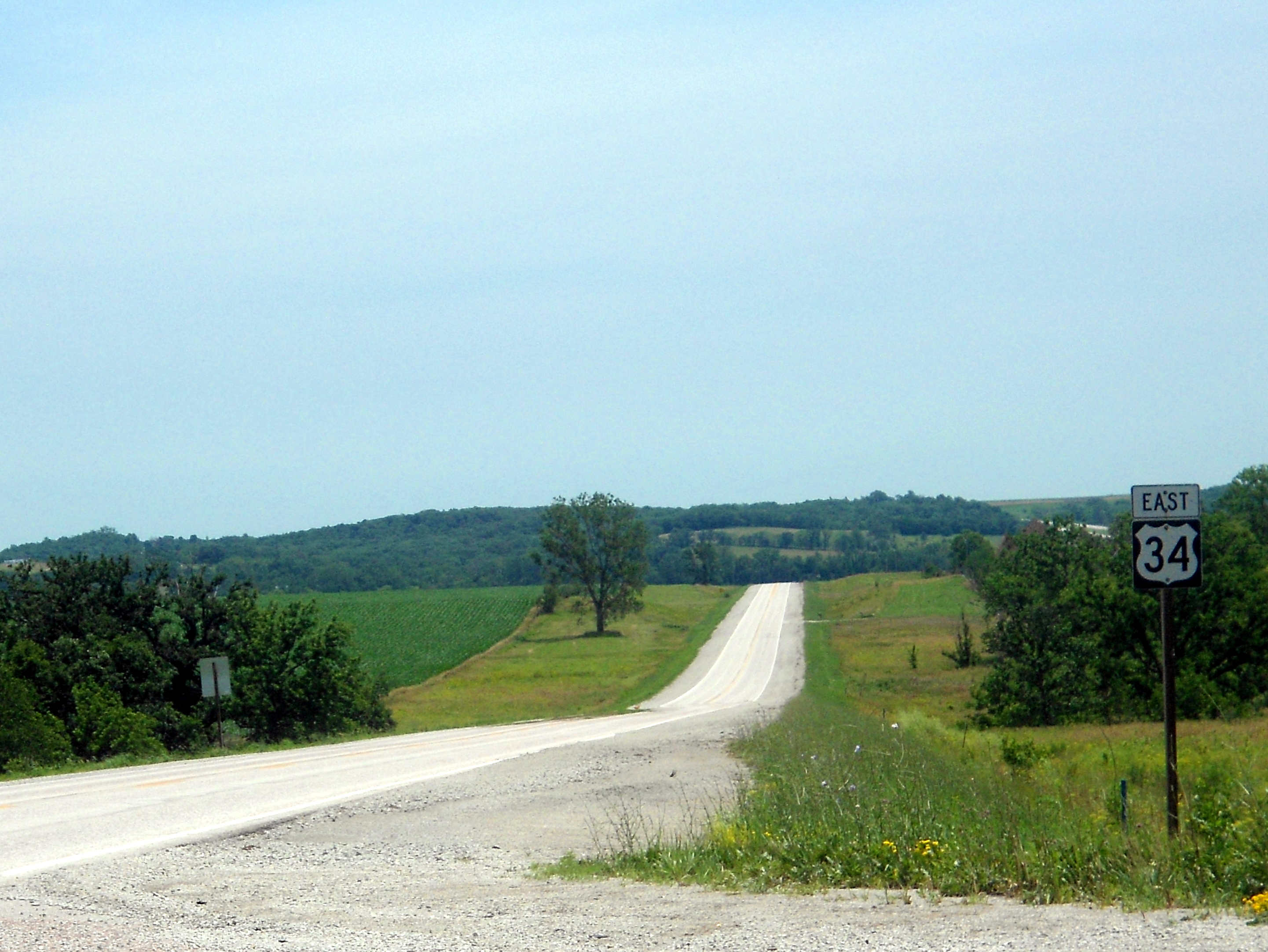
US 34 near the US 71 interchange

The highway heads due east past the towns of Malvern and Hastings before reaching Emerson. There, a one-quadrant interchange provides a direct connection to US 59, which passes overhead. As the highway approaches Red Oak, it eases to the south-southeast. It intersects Iowa 48 near the East Nishnabotna River at the northwestern corner of the town. East of there, the highway heads southeast toward Stanton; it straightens out easterly again near Viking Lake State Park. US 34 crosses the West Nodaway River shortly before a folded diamond interchange with US 71.

East of the US 71 junction, US 34 begins another section of highway that travels due east. Several miles pass between crossings of the middle and eastern branches of the Nodaway River, the latter crossing is on the southwestern outskirts of Corning. At Corning, there lies an intersection with Iowa 148. Still heading due east, the highway passes a cemetery at the junction with CR N46. At the end of the straight section, Iowa 25 meets the highway and the two routes head northeast toward Creston. There, the highways diverge on the western side of town and US 34 again heads to the east. The highway intersects US 169 as it enters Afton. East of Afton, US 34 and US 169 run concurrently east; the road curves to avoid crossing the BNSF Railway line. Some distance comes between the road and the rails and the highway straightens. US 169 turns off to the north and US 34 continues east toward Thayer.

=== Central Iowa ===
East of Thayer, it passes Murray and then turns to the southeast in order to enter the sprawling commercial area on the western edge of Osceola. There the highway meets the entrance and exit ramps of I-35. Closer to downtown Osceola is the intersection with US 69. As it exits Osceola, US 34 passes a county park and again crosses the railroad. Rolling hills and truck lanes mark the road until just before Lucas. There, US 65 joins from the north and the two roads curve to the east and toward Lucas. The two roads split; US 65 turns to the south while US 34 curves to the northeast and then back to the southeast. On the outskirts of Chariton, US 34 Business continues along the same vector while the mainline US 34 bypasses the city to the south. On the southern side of Chariton, there is a diamond interchange with Iowa 14. Near Red Haw State Park, the Chariton business route rejoins the mainline highway.

US 34 heads due east again. It passes the small towns of Russell and Melrose, both of which lie along the curving railroad to the south, so access to the towns is provided by short connector roads. Just north of the highway is the unincorporated town of Georgetown, which is home to the historic St. Patrick's Catholic Church. The railroad passes beneath the highway before both the road and rails enter Albia. It intersects Iowa 5 on the southern end of town. The highway curves through southern Iowa farmland as it heads towards Ottumwa.

=== Eastern Iowa ===
As US 34 approaches Ottumwa, an intersection with Albia Road leads traffic towards the southern half of the city. This section of Albia Road is a former section of US 34 and until recently, a section of US 34 Business. The mainline highway widens to four lanes and intersects the present endpoint of the business route at Quincy Avenue. It curves to the southeast along the bank of the Des Moines River and intersects Wapello Street, which carries both US 63 Business and Iowa 149. The junction is the southern end of Iowa 149. After a pair of interchanges, US 34 meets US 63 at a roundabout. The two highways cross the river and head generally northeast. The Roemer Avenue intersection marks the eastern end of the Ottumwa business route. Upon reaching the expressway on the eastern side of town, US 34 and US 63 head in opposite directions.

For the rest of its trek through Iowa, US 34 is routed along a four-lane expressway. It uses the eastern leg of the Des Moines to Burlington Highway, which since 2009 has carried the Iowa 163 designation when it was extended from Oskaloosa to Burlington. Prior to 2009, Iowa 163 ran from Des Moines to Oskaloosa. The application of the 163 route number gave the Des Moines to Burlington corridor a single route number. The highway bypasses Agency and Batavia to the north. Between those towns, an interchange with Iowa 16 directs traffic to Eldon and the house that served as the backdrop to Grant Wood's painting American Gothic.

West of Fairfield, the highway curves to the southeast to begin a freeway bypass of the city. It passes over the BNSF Railway and the former routing of US 34, which becomes a business route. Iowa 1 intersects the freeway south of downtown. At-grade intersections resume past the eastern end of the Fairfield business route. The expressway gradually moves to the south as it goes by Lockridge and Rome. Near Westwood, the highway abruptly curves to the northeast as the Mount Pleasant business route begins.

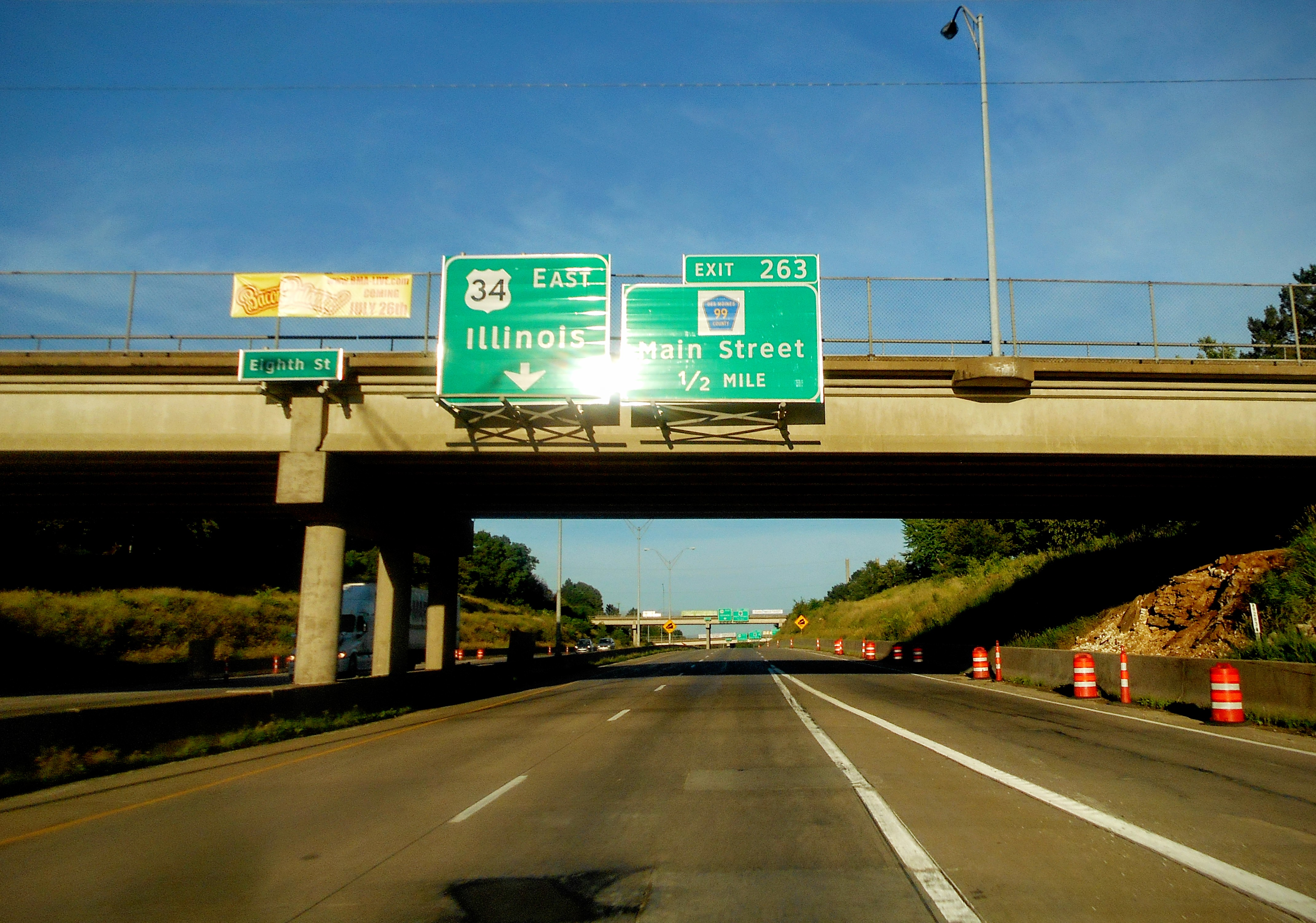
The US 34 freeway in Burlington

On the northern side of Mount Pleasant, three adjacent interchanges complete all movements between US 34 / Iowa 163 and US 218 / Iowa 27, the Avenue of the Saints Highway. The four routes briefly travel together along the eastern edge of the city. As the business route rejoins the mainline, US 34 / Iowa 163 exit and head to the southeast towards New London.

The bypasses of New London and Danville keep the expressway west and south of each community. As it approaches Middletown, home of the Iowa Army Ammunition Plant, the highway takes a 90-degree turn to the east and becomes a freeway. Between Beaverdale and West Burlington, the highway crosses Mount Pleasant Street, which formerly carried US 34. It then winds south of the main residential area of West Burlington and meets US 61. The freeway continues east and descends into the Mississippi River valley. Two exits provide access to downtown Burlington. The interchange for CR X99 sits at the foot of the Great River Bridge. The highway crosses the bridge and enters Illinois. The Iowa 163 designation ends on the bridge at the state line.

== History ==
What is now the US 34 corridor has been used, under various names, for over 100 years. The route was first organized as the Blue Grass Route in 1910 during the height of the Good Roads Movement. Then, the road was maintained by the Iowa Blue Grass Road Association, which solicited donations from people who lived along the route. Ten years later, the Iowa General Assembly passed a primary road bill which shifted the responsibility of road maintenance from associations to Iowa's 99 counties. At the same time, route numbers were applied to the new primary highway system; the Blue Grass Route was designated Primary Road No. 8. In 1925, confusion between route associations and nascent state highway systems led to the creation of the U.S. Highway System. Primary Road No. 8 was replaced by U.S. Highway 34 the next year. Paving of the highway was completed in 1930; US 34 was the first road in Iowa to be paved in its entirety.

Work on modernizing Iowa's highway system began in the 1950s, mostly by straightening and widening the original highways built in the 1930s. By the end of the 1950s and into the 1960s, sections of US 34 were identified as parts of important corridors that required expansion to four lanes. Construction on the eastern and western sides of the state, in Burlington and Glenwood, respectively, did result in parts of the highway becoming four lanes; other highway projects were cut back during the 1970s recession. At Glenwood, the discovery and handling of Native American remains led to the Native American Graves Protection and Repatriation Act. In the mid-1990s, the Iowa Department of Transportation began an ambitious project to expand seven important corridors, one of which connected Des Moines to Burlington. The portion of US 34 between Ottumwa and Burlington was finished in 2008 when the bypass of Fairfield opened. At both state line crossings, modern bridges capable of handling four-lane, high-speed traffic were built to replace old and obsolete truss bridges. The Great River Bridge over the Mississippi River opened in Burlington in 1994 and the US 34 Missouri River Bridge replaced the Plattsmouth Bridge in 2014.

=== Blue Grass Route ===
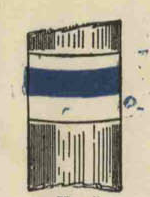
Blue Grass Route
- Location: Council Bluffs–Burlington
- Length: 310 mi (500 km)
- Existed: 1910–1925

The 310-mile-long (500 km) Blue Grass Route, also called the Blue Grass Road, connected Council Bluffs and Burlington. The road closely followed the mainline of the Chicago, Burlington and Quincy Railroad (CB&Q). Charles H. Thomas of Kent suggested the road's name because it traversed through, as he saw it, "the finest blue grass region of the country". The route was first organized in 1910 by Joe Long, a newspaper man from Osceola started to publicize the road's new moniker. Long organized the first committee meeting of residents along the route who were interested in promoting their highway and in good roads in general. In official trips along the route, the Iowa Blue Grass Road Association spoke to at least 10,000 people about the goals of the group and collected $40,000 (equivalent to $1 million in 2024) for the purpose of improving the road.

In 1913, shortly after the Iowa General Assembly passed legislation allowing road associations to officially register their route with the Iowa State Highway Commission, the Blue Grass Road Association sent the highway commission a check for $5 (equivalent to $168 in 2024) with the intent of becoming the first route registered by the state. Three years later, it was determined that the association had not completed its registration application. This meant that the road was not the first to be registered in Iowa. After communication resumed between Thomas, then the association president and state senator, and the state highway commission, the Blue Grass Road became an official registered route on December 1, 1917.

=== Primary highway ===
Primary Road No. 8
- Location: Council Bluffs–Burlington
- Length: 310 mi (500 km)
- Existed: 1920–1926

In 1919, the Iowa General Assembly passed a bill that created a fund for improving and hard-surfacing nearly 6,300 miles (10,100 km) of primary roads in the state. The primary road system was to connect every city and town with at least 1000 inhabitants. The bill gave Iowa's 99 counties the responsibility for maintaining the roads, which had previously fallen upon road associations that sponsored their respective highways. The new primary roads were assigned route numbers, a trend seen in other Midwestern states. Route numbers were painted onto telegraph and telephone poles in order to guide travelers without the need for maps. The Blue Grass Route was designated Primary Road No. 8 for the entirety of its route.

No. 8 followed a path through southern Iowa that resembles the path of US 34 today. It began on Main Street in downtown Council Bluffs at an intersection with Broadway, which carried No. 6, better known as the Lincoln Highway. No. 8 headed south and east out of town and into the Loess Hills until Glenwood. Between Hillsdale and Hastings, the highway overlapped No. 4. It then turned south so it could pass through Emerson and downtown Red Oak. There was a short overlap of No. 18 after which the highway briefly turned south and then east. No. 8 entered Corning from the northwest and exited to the southeast. From Corning to Creston, No. 8 followed the current path of US 34. East of Creston, it curved toward Afton, where it intersected No. 16. From No. 16 to Chariton, No. 8 largely followed the current routing of US 34. The road passed through downtown Chariton and then to the southeast. From Albia to Ottumwa, it followed a curvy road located north of the present highway. Through Ottumwa, the road followed the southern bank of the Des Moines River and then crossed into downtown at sharp bend in the river. It passed through Agency, Batavia, and Fairfield. At Mount Pleasant, it met No. 40. From Mount Pleasant, No. 8 headed to the southeast through New London and Danville then turned sharply east at Middletown. The route ended at Burlington.

=== U.S. Highway origins ===
1926-era US 34 shield

In the mid-1920s, automobile associations continued to sponsor their named routes—of which there were 64 in Iowa—on top of the route numbers given by the state highway commission. This was more confusing than helpful to the casual traveler, so in 1924, the American Association of State Highway Officials (AASHO, later AASHTO) called for a national system of interstate highways. Of the 75,884 miles (122,123 km) proposed by AASHO, nearly 3,000 miles (4,800 km) were allocated to Iowa. Support for the system was nearly unanimous among state highway officials across the country and the new national routings and route numbers were assigned in 1925. The Iowa State Highway Commission chose to renumber a few highways so important routes did not have conflicting route numbers. U.S. Highway 34 was designated along the entirety of Primary Road No. 8, which was the Blue Grass Route. Once the U.S. Highway System was established, the automobile association-sponsored roads gradually disappeared.

Originally, US 34's national western end was the corner of Main Street and Broadway in Council Bluffs, the same as Primary Road No. 8. Just a few blocks away was the national western end of U.S. Highway 32. US 275, which was designated in the latter half of 1931 as a shorter route between Omaha, Nebraska, and St. Joseph, Missouri, joined US 34 near Glenwood and ended in downtown Council Bluffs. However, the two highways would only share an endpoint for a few years. An automobile club in Nebraska sought to have US 34 extended through their state. In 1935, AASHO consented and the highway was rerouted west at Glenwood to cross the Missouri River at Plattsmouth and end at Grand Island, Nebraska. The relocated highway replaced Iowa 134, which had been designated five years prior.

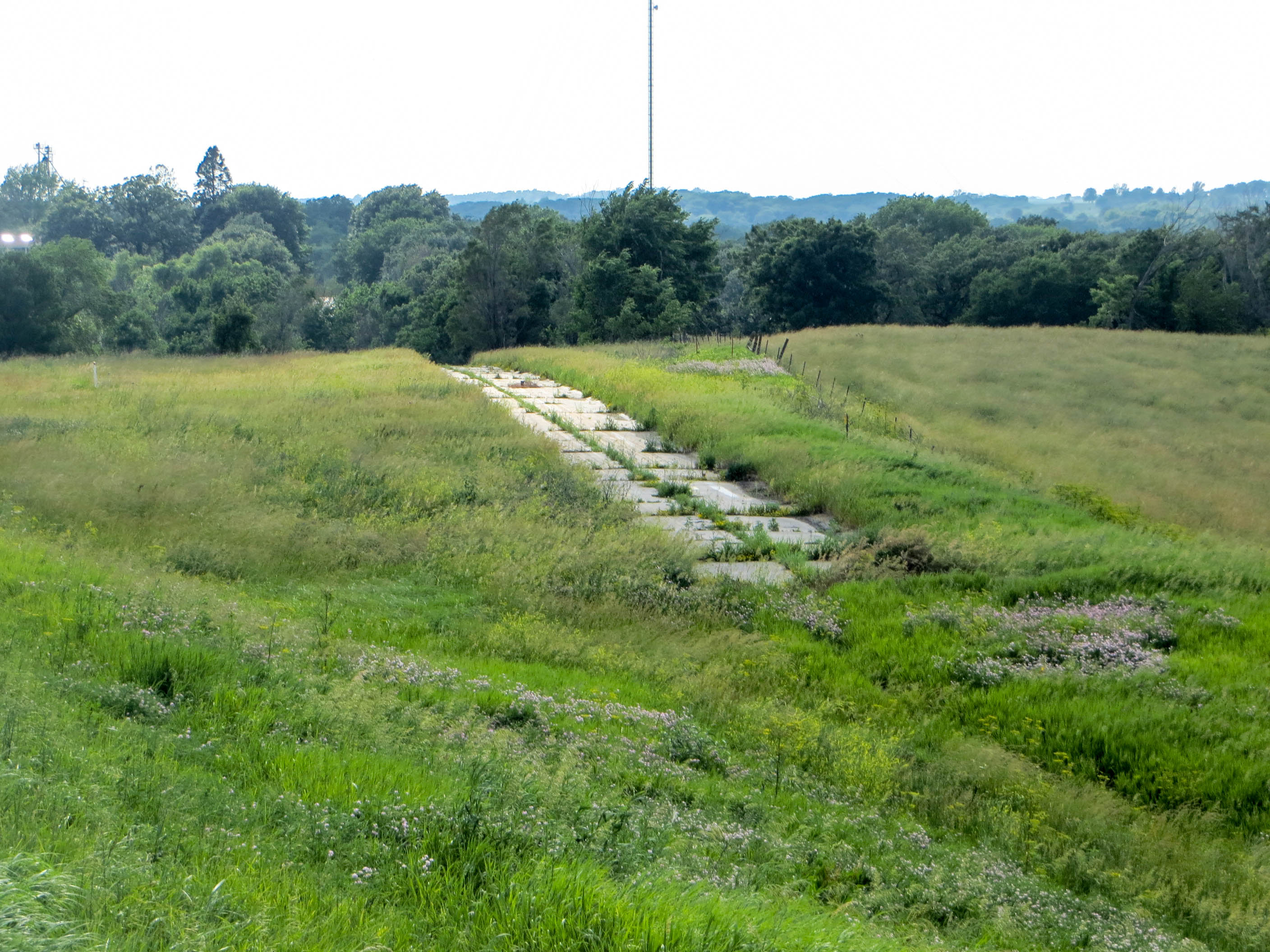
The old US 34 right-of-way near Corning as seen in 2016

Paving of the highway was completed in 1930 and US 34 was recognized as the first highway to be completed across the state. A celebration marking the occasion was held at the Iowana Hotel in Creston attended by over 5,000 guests, including Governor John Hammill. The Glenwood-to-Plattsmouth section, which became part of US 34 in 1935, was paved in 1946 and 1947. The original pavement was 18 feet (5.5 m) wide, which was sufficient for the automobiles and traffic levels of the 1930s. By the 1950s, increased traffic and wider vehicles took their toll on highways. In some parts of the state, highways were widened to withstand modern vehicles. In 1951, road widening cost around $100,000 per mile or $62,000 per kilometer (equivalent to $1 million/mi or $620,000/km in 2024). A statewide project began in 1955 to widen roads three feet (91 cm) on each side to a total width of 22 feet (6.7 m). In some instances, it was more cost effective to build a new road than to improve the older road. Between Emerson and Corning, a new road was going to be $2 million cheaper (equivalent to $16.4 million in 2024) than rebuilding the existing road. Between Albia and Ottumwa, an 18-mile-long (29 km) section of new highway to the south of the older road cost just over $1.8 million (equivalent to $14.3 million in 2024).

After two floods inundated Ottumwa in 1947, the city created an ambitious public works project beginning in 1955. The main part of the project was the straightening and widening of the Des Moines River through the city. The main channel of the river was an oxbow that curved into the southern half of the city; a smaller channel bordered the northern half. The smaller northern channel was to be widened to accommodate the full river. Dirt excavated for the new channel was to be used to build levees and to provide fill dirt for the relocation of US 34. The highway previously entered the city from the west along Albia Road, followed the curve of the river at Richmond Avenue, and turned onto Jefferson Avenue where it met US 63 a few blocks later, and crossed the river. The new path of US 34 took a more northerly route than Albia Road into the city and then followed the new southern bank of the river. US 63 was relocated at the same time; it was rerouted to the eastern side of the John Deere plant along the bank of the river and met up with the new US 34 road. A new bridge over the Des Moines River, near the John Deere plant, along with an eastern bypass of the downtown area opened to traffic in 1966.

=== Four-lane upgrades ===
As early as 1958, an 11-member road study committee recommended the construction of a state freeway system not to exceed 2,000 miles (3,200 km) in length. This freeway system included sections of US 34 between Ottumwa and Burlington. Ten years later, the Iowa State Highway Commission approved a freeway-expressway system that would complement the Interstate Highway System under construction. Most of US 34 fell under the plan; from I-29 to Ottumwa, the road would be built to expressway standards and from Ottumwa to Burlington, it would be built up to freeway standards. Access to and from the freeway portion would come from grade-separated interchanges while expressway portion would have both interchanges and at-grade intersections. In the early 1980s, following the recommendations of a 27-member task force organized by Governor Robert D. Ray, the Iowa Department of Transportation shifted its priorities from expansion of the primary highway system to maintenance of existing highways.

==== US 534 freeway ====
First announced in late 1965 and approved the next year, the Burlington freeway project was slated to be completed in 1972 at a cost of $13.3 million (equivalent to $87.1 million in 2024). The ISHC named the freeway project "US 534" in order to differentiate it from the existing US 34. The new highway was going to run from the MacArthur Bridge west to meet up with US 34 west of West Burlington. The highway's path was planned to run through the North Hill neighborhood, whose residents were against the freeway forcing their relocations. Ultimately, land through North Hill was acquired, but at a cost of $2.6 million (equivalent to $15.4 million in 2024). The first section of freeway to open, six-tenths mile (970 m) between Third Street and Central Avenue, opened in 1971 to little fanfare. The seven blocks of new road cost $6.65 million (equivalent to $39.3 million in 2024), just under the original proposed cost of the entire project.

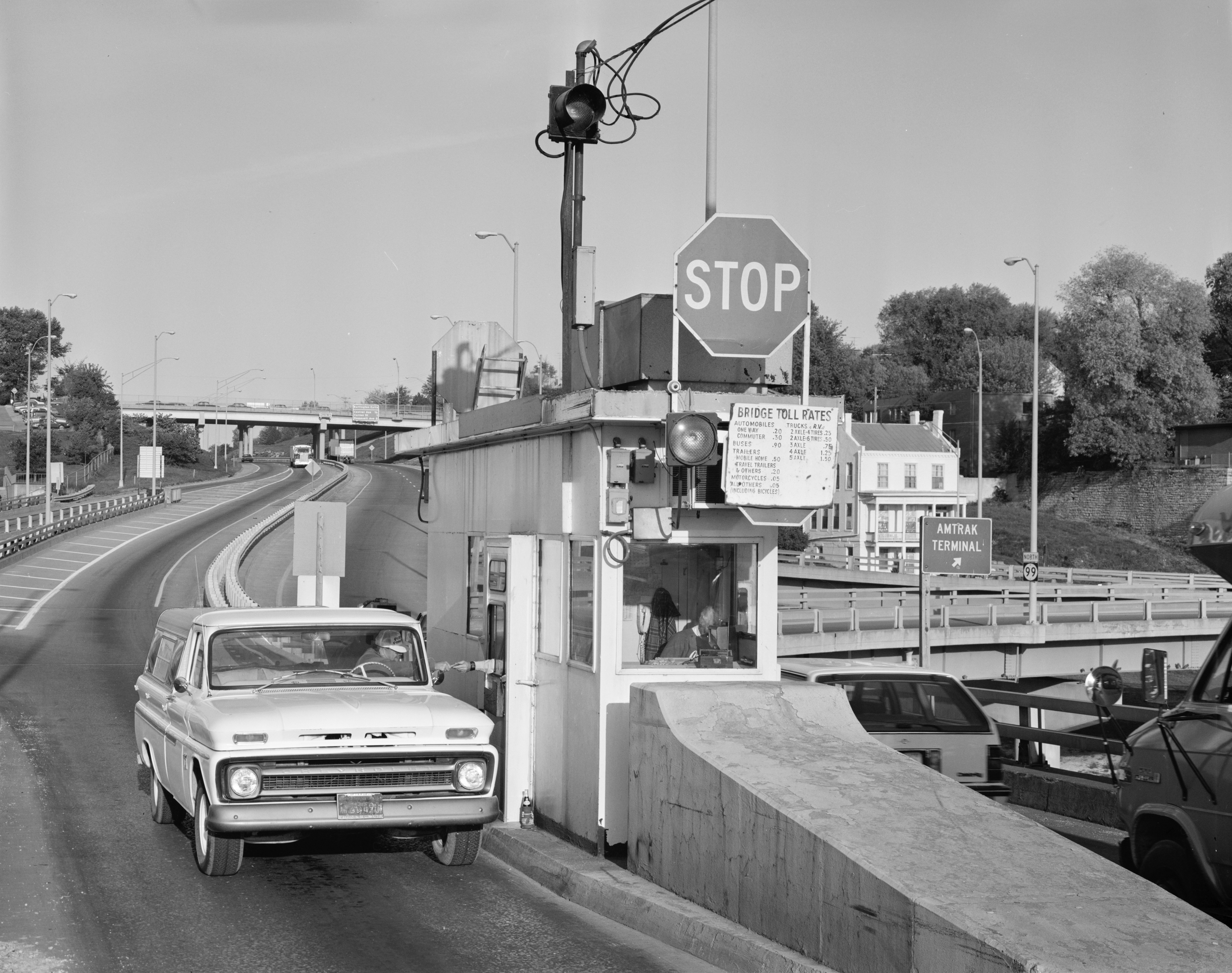
Looking to the west down the new US 534 freeway at the MacArthur Bridge toll booth

Ramps connecting the freeway to the MacArthur Bridge would not open until 1974. For most traffic, the new access to the bridge was seen as an improvement, but not for wide loads. Traffic wider than 12 feet (3.7 m) could not pass between the westbound tollbooth and railing. A temporary solution was for wide loads to block eastbound traffic and pass through the eastbound tollbooth lane, immediately exit the freeway via the eastbound entrance ramp, and perform an end-around on city streets to come back to the westbound entrance ramp.

Work progressed to the west toward Roosevelt Avenue (US 61). Curran Street was closed in late 1972 for the construction of an overpass above the freeway. By mid-1974, grading work was completed and crews were working on laying road base and paving. A ribbon cutting ceremony on June 13, 1975, along with the removal of barricades, marked the opening of the freeway between Central and Roosevelt Avenues.

West of Roosevelt Avenue, construction lagged behind. Work was scheduled to begin in 1976 after the freeway opened up to Roosevelt Avenue, but financial problems at the Iowa Highway Commission, including a 42-percent increase in construction costs, led to delays. The commission had asked that US 534 project be delayed until at least 1978, which meant completion would not occur until 1980. They also asked that the plans to widen US 61 from West to Sunnyside Avenues in western Burlington, which included the connection between the 534 freeway and US 34, be scrapped entirely. City leaders pressed the commission to include US 61 in their plans as its need was more urgent than the completion of the 534 freeway.

In February 1975, President Gerald Ford released $2 billion (equivalent to $9.03 billion in 2024) of impounded highway funds, of which, at least $40 million (equivalent to $181 million in 2024) was allocated for Iowa projects. With the new federal funding, the highway commission resumed the US 534 project, among other "ready to go" projects. Prior to the new funding, the commission was only going to build an interchange at Gear Avenue in West Burlington. Work was completed on the final section within two years. It opened officially with a ceremony on November 10, 1976, eleven years after it was first announced. Total cost for the project was $26 million (equivalent to $111 million in 2024), an amount considerably larger than the proposed $7.6 million. The next year, the Iowa Department of Transportation received approval from the American Association of State Highway and Transportation Officials (AASHTO) to move US 34 onto the 534 freeway.

==== Glenwood expressway ====
On the other side of the state, a US 34 project near Glenwood was tied to construction of I-29. In late 1969, the Iowa Highway Commission announced its intention to relocate US 34 from the eastern junction of US 275 to an interchange along the new I-29. Once work on I-29 in the area was completed, the commission sought to work on the US 34 expressway. The exact routing, which was an approximately six-and-a-half-mile-long (10.5 km) southern bypass of Glenwood that connected to I-29 west of the city, was announced in mid-1970.

In 1971, during the grading phase of the project, highway workers found about twenty gravesites along with the skeleton of a Native American teenage girl. Archaeologists determined that the site was indicative of a white family cemetery from the 1850s. A district court judge ordered the highway commission to pay for the costs of moving the remains to the cemetery in Glenwood, while the native skeleton was taken to the state archaeology lab in Iowa City for analysis. Archaeologists and anthropology students were allowed to dig at the site for two months, which produced earthlodge sites and artifacts from the Glenwood culture.

Maria Pearson, a Yankton Dakota woman, objected to the bones being taken to Iowa City, citing the Indian girl's "right to remain an Indian", even in death. Pearson threatened to hold an all-Indian protest at the state archaeologist's office until the girl's bones were reinterred. Pearson later said in a letter to the state archaeologist that reburial at the Glenwood Cemetery would be satisfactory since it was near where the remains were found. Pearson protested to Governor Robert D. Ray by gaining an audience with him after entering his office in traditional attire. When the governor asked what he could do for her, Pearson responded that he could give back her people's bones. The ensuing controversy led to the passage of the Iowa Burials Protection Act of 1976, the first legislative act in the U.S. that specifically protected Native American remains. The Iowa law led to the Native American Graves Protection and Repatriation Act in 1990.

Work along the expressway progressed and by the end of 1972, most of the grading was completed and paving was scheduled for the next year. By mid-September, approximately half the cement-laying was finished. There was a possibility for the highway to be open to traffic by the end of 1973. However, when winter weather hit, there were about ten days of work remaining, which delayed the official opening of the road to early 1974. The expressway was dedicated on June 7, 1974, two weeks after it opened. US 34's relocation onto the new highway was made official when AASHTO gave consent later in the month.

==== Des Moines to Burlington highway ====
The road study organized in 1958 identified roads that should be expanded to four lanes by 1980. In addition to the segments of US 34 between Ottumwa and Burlington, a road connecting Ottumwa to Des Moines was listed. An updated report in 1968 extended the four-lane road to Burlington and called for the highway to be built to freeway standards.

Budget constraints in the early part of the 2000s caused the Iowa DOT to table some highway projects, but they were still committed to completing the six high-priority corridors. Part of the budget issues were caused by a change in federal earmark philosophy. Prior to this change, the United States Congress would fund projects individually, but now funding was being given to states in the form of a block grant and discretion on how the funds would be used was now up to the states. The DOT was able to achieve some savings by extending the timeline for completing the priority projects.

Construction continued on the Des Moines-to-Burlington route, though at a slower pace. Grading along the bypasses of Danville and Middletown was well underway in 2003, three years behind the original schedule. Paving of the bypass of Mount Pleasant was set to begin in 2004. Ottumwa's bypass opened to traffic on November 19, 2007, also behind schedule. The new road shifted US 63 traffic out of downtown and onto US 34 heading east from the intersection of the two highways near the city's John Deere plant. The final section of the 165-mile-long (266 km) Des Moines to Burlington route was completed in November 2008. Governor Chet Culver presided over the ribbon cutting ceremony that celebrated the opening of the Fairfield bypass and the completion of the 1996 highway plan. The next year, the Des Moines to Burlington route was given a single route number, Iowa 163, which had previously extended from Des Moines to Oskaloosa. Between Oskaloosa and Burlington, the Iowa 163 number was overlaid atop the existing route numbers, US 63 and US 34.

=== River crossings ===
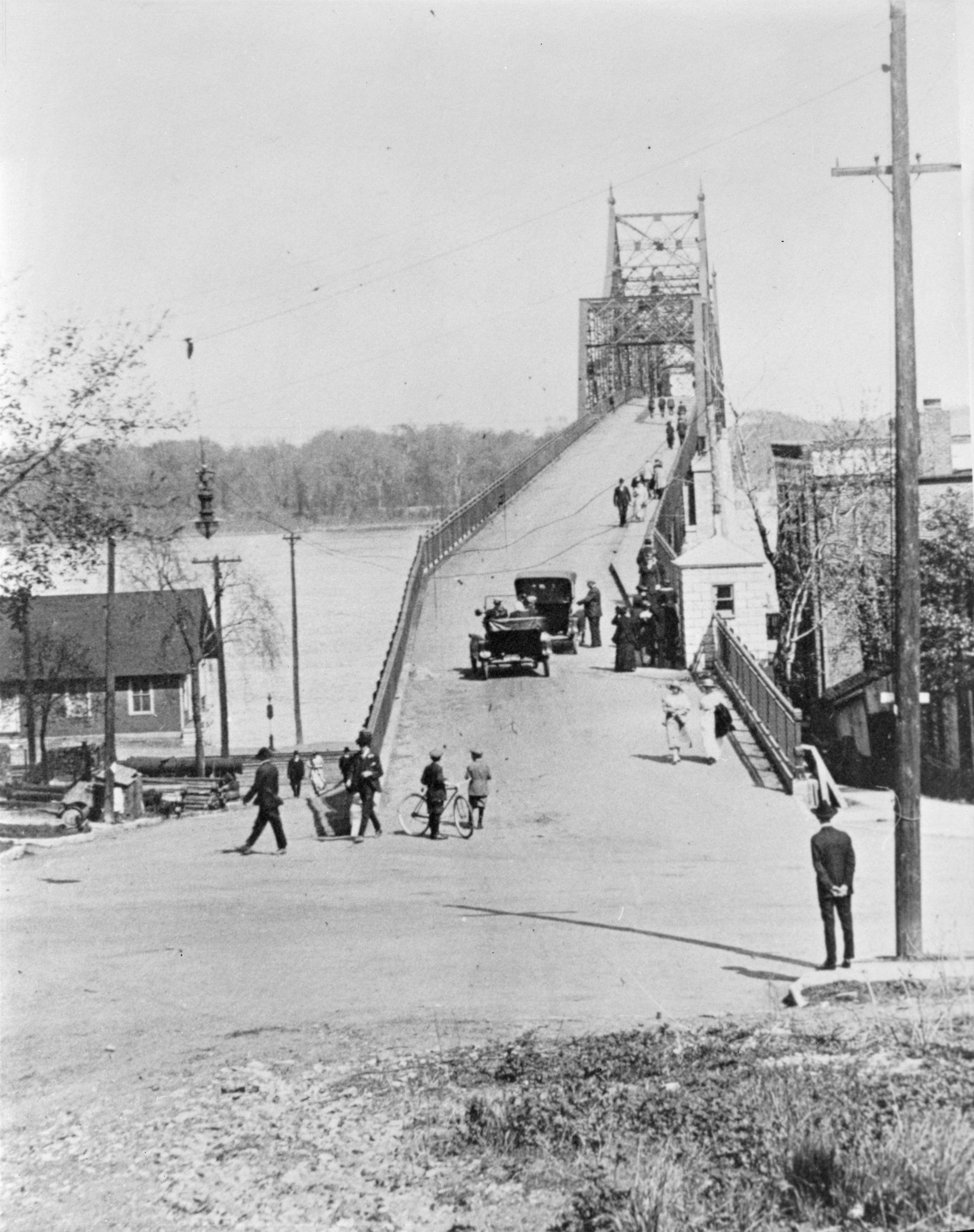
At the foot of the old MacArthur Bridge in Burlington shortly after opening

Upon entering and exiting the state, US 34 crosses a major river—the Missouri River in the west and the Mississippi River in the east. Historically, the highway crossed each river on narrow, two-lane truss bridges. Since the 1990s, both river crossings have been replaced with modern four-lane bridges capable of handling high-speed traffic.

The MacArthur Bridge was a cantilever truss bridge that opened in March 1917 as the Citizen's Bridge. The connection from Burlington to Illinois cost $200,000 to build (equivalent to $3.22 million in 2024). The bridge was renamed the MacArthur Bridge in 1923 after J.A. MacArthur, the president of the Citizen's Bridge company. While in service, the toll bridge collected millions in revenue. Some of that revenue was siphoned away from bridge expenses to pay for unrelated projects. That practice ended in 1983 when all tolls were directed to bridge-related expenses only, including construction of a new bridge. Starting in 1974, tollbooth attendants weighed tractor-trailers on either side as the bridge only allowed trucks to cross safely from one direction at a time.

An environmental assessment completed in 1986 suggested that the costs of rehabilitating the MacArthur Bridge far outweighed the construction of a new bridge and recommended a cable-stayed bridge design in order to provide a 660-foot-wide (200 m) navigation channel. Workers began building the new bridge, the Great River Bridge, in 1988. The Great Flood of 1993 delayed opening of the bridge. The first two lanes opened to traffic on October 4, 1993, and opened fully on August 25, 1994. The new bridge cost $53 million (equivalent to $101 million in 2024). The MacArthur Bridge was dismantled shortly after the Great River Bridge opened.

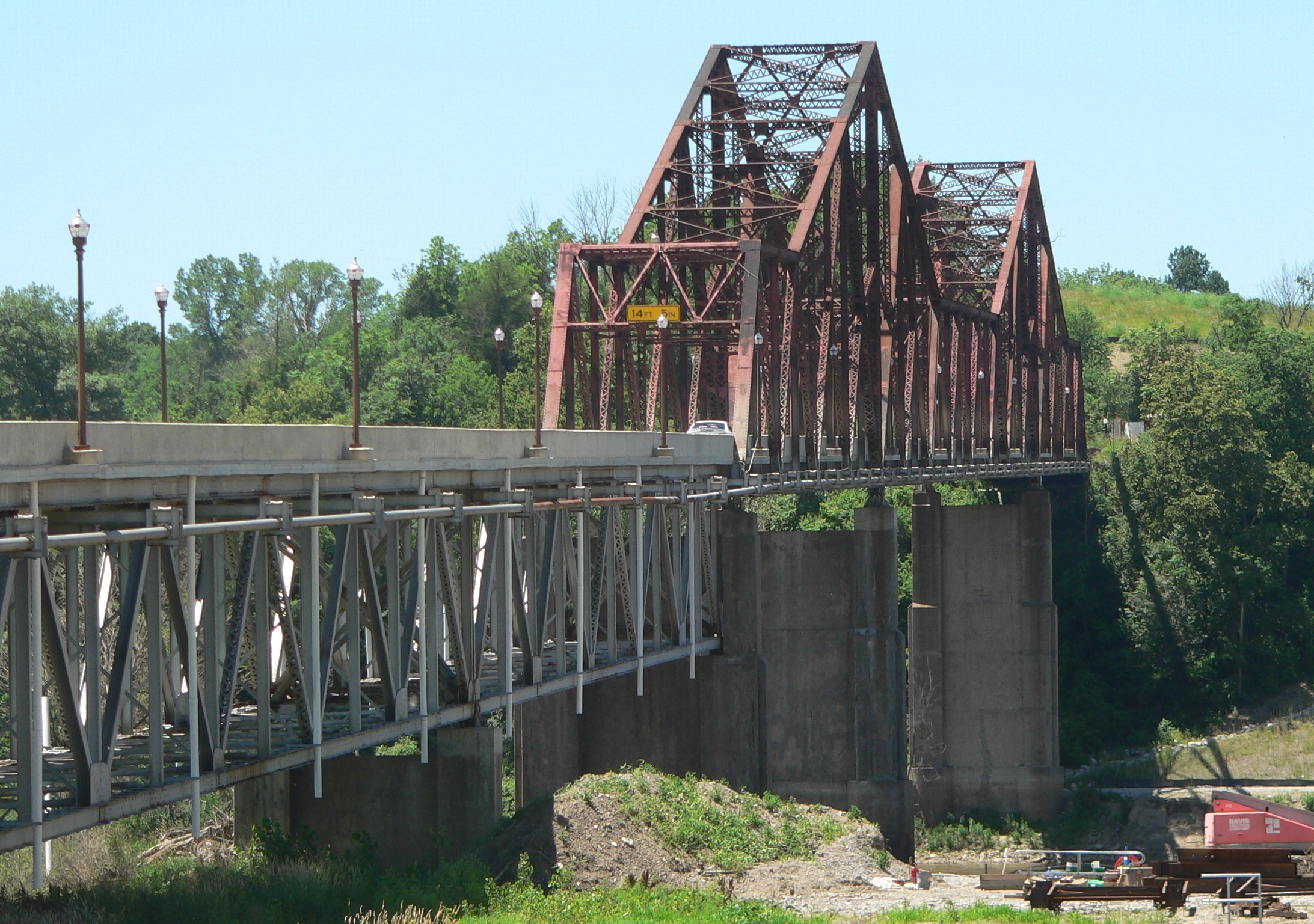
The Plattsmouth Bridge in 2013

On the other side of the state, the Plattsmouth Bridge was also showing its age. The 20-foot-wide (6.1 m) steel bridge was built in 1929 at a cost of $750,000 (equivalent to $10.8 million in 2024). Since opening, the bridge was owned and operated as a toll bridge by the Plattsmouth Bridge Company. Beginning in the 1990s, the Iowa DOT and Nebraska Department of Roads (NDOR) began looking at ways to improve access to I-29 from the southern parts of the Omaha metropolitan area. Both agencies sought to create free flowing traffic movement between US 75 and I-29. There were two Missouri River crossings in the project area, the Plattsmouth Bridge and the Bellevue Bridge—which carried Nebraska Highway 370 (N-370) and Iowa 370—that required traffic to pass through populated areas in order to move from US 75 to I-29. Neither the Plattsmouth Bridge nor the Bellevue Bridge at 20 and 22 feet (6.1 and 6.7 m) wide, respectively, met the functional requirements of traffic projections for the year 2030. Both the Iowa DOT and NDOR had plans to replace one of the two bridges, but a change in funding forced the agencies to combine resources to build one new bridge. The collapse of the I-35W bridge in Minneapolis on August 1, 2007, brought bridge safety to the national forefront. Inspections of the Plattsmouth and Bellevue Bridges determined that both bridges were among the least safe in Iowa.

In 2007, the bridge was sold to the City of Plattsmouth for $1. The city created a commission to operate and maintain the bridge. The move from private to public ownership allowed money from the Iowa DOT and NDOR to be used to restore the bridge. The bridge closed for $3.2 million (equivalent to $4.56 million in 2024) of rehabilitation work on April 21, 2008. Work included repairing the bridge deck and piers and installing new guardrails and lighting. The bridge reopened on November 9, 2008. At the time, it was hoped that the repairs would allow 20 to 25 years of continued use, though a new US 34 bridge would mean that heavy truck traffic could be moved off of the Plattsmouth Bridge.

Officials from the Iowa DOT and NDOR agreed that once a new bridge between Bellevue and Plattsmouth was built, the US 34 designation would be pulled from the Plattsmouth Bridge and applied to the new bridge. Construction of the new bridge began in 2010. While earthwork farther inland could take place, no work at the river could take place between February and June because the crossing was located in the spawning zone of the rare pallid sturgeon. Any vibrations from construction could disrupt breeding. Crews were also halted between June and September 2011 because major flooding inundated the work zone. When construction resumed, it was estimated that only five percent of work had been completed. The delays pushed back the projected opening of the bridge from late 2013 to late 2014. The US 34 designation was applied to the new bridge in May 2014, before construction was completed. The bridge was dedicated on October 22, 2014. Governors Terry Branstad of Iowa and Dave Heineman of Nebraska, both of whom spoke at the opening ceremony, felt the bridge would be a boon to the local economy and attract jobs. After the new bridge opened, the state highway designation (N-370 and Iowa 370) was pulled from the Bellevue Bridge. An agreement was reached in 2010 to transfer jurisdiction of Iowa 370 on the Iowa side from the state to Mills County. The transfer was to take place upon completion of the new US 34 bridge. At the Plattsmouth Bridge, a 3-short-ton (2.7-long-ton; 2.7 t) weight limit was posted on the bridge after rusted gusset plates were found.

== Major intersections ==
County	Location	mi	km	Exit	Destinations	Notes
Missouri River		0.000	0.000		US 34 west – South Bellevue	Continuation into Nebraska
Missouri River		0.000	0.000	US 34 Missouri River Bridge; Nebraska–Iowa state line		
Mills	Plattville Township	4.004	6.444		I-29 / US 275 north – Council Bluffs, Kansas City	Western end of US 275 overlap
Mills	Plattville Township				Deacon Road / Loess Hills Scenic Byway	
Mills	Glenwood	7.819	12.583	8	CR L35 – Glenwood, Pacific Junction	Former US 275 and Iowa 385
Mills	Center Township	10.600	17.059		CR H30 – Glenwood	Former US 34
Mills	Center Township	12.165	19.578		US 275 south / Loess Hills Scenic Byway – Sidney	Eastern end of US 275 overlap
Mills	Center Township	13.660	21.984		CR L55 – Silver City	Former Iowa 242
Mills	Silver Creek Township	16.663	26.816		CR L63 – Malvern	Former Iowa 41
Mills	Indian Creek Township	21.159	34.052		CR M16 – Hastings	Former Iowa 166
Mills	Indian Creek Township	23.167	37.284		CR H34 – Emerson	Former US 34
Mills	Indian Creek Township	26.155	42.092	—	To US 59 – Emerson, Oakland	One-quadrant interchange
Montgomery	Red Oak	35.109	56.502		Iowa 48 – Red Oak, Elliott	
Montgomery	Red Oak Township	38.483	61.932		CR H34	Former US 34
Montgomery	Frankfort Township	42.658	68.651		CR M63 – Stanton	Former Iowa 120
Montgomery	East Township	48.785	78.512	—	US 71 – Villisca, Atlantic	Interchange
Adams	Nodaway Township	53.463	86.040		CR N26 – Nodaway	Former Iowa 155
Adams	Corning	62.016	99.805		Iowa 148 (Quincy Street) – Corning, Bedford	
Adams	Mercer Township	68.731	110.612		CR N61 – Prescott	Former Iowa 186
Adams	Grant Township	70.764	113.884		CR N64 – Lenox	Former Iowa 49
Adams–Union county line	Grant–Platte township line	75.740	121.892		Iowa 25 south – Clearfield	Western end of Iowa 25 overlap
Union	Creston	83.388	134.200		Iowa 25 north (Summer Street) / Mormon Pioneer National Historic Trail – Greenfield	Eastern end of Iowa 25 overlap
Union	Afton	92.805	149.355		US 169 south (Douglas Street) – Mount Ayr	Western end of US 169 overlap
Union	Jones Township	99.010	159.341		US 169 north – Winterset	Eastern end of US 169 overlap
Clarke	Troy Township	105.531	169.836		CR R15 – Murray	Former Iowa 152
Clarke	Osceola	114.131	183.676		I-35 – Des Moines, Kansas City	
Clarke	Osceola	115.674	186.159		US 69 (Main Street) / Mormon Pioneer National Historic Trail – Indianola, Amtrak station	
Clarke	Jackson Township	124.816	200.872		CR R69 – Woodburn	Former Iowa 104
Lucas	Lucas	131.111	211.003		US 65 north – Indianola	Western end of US 65 overlap
Lucas	Lucas	131.672	211.906		US 65 south – Humeston	Eastern end of US 65 overlap
Lucas	Chariton	138.876	223.499		US 34 Bus. east (Court Avenue)	
Lucas	Chariton	140.288	225.772	—	Iowa 14 – Chariton, Corydon	Interchange
Lucas	Chariton	141.505	227.730		US 34 Bus. west (Albia Road)	
Lucas	Cedar Township	146.336	235.505		CR S56 – Russell	Former Iowa 97
Monroe	Wayne Township	153.553	247.120		CR S70 – Melrose	Former Iowa 68
Monroe	Troy Township	164.109	264.108		CR H35 – Albia	Former US 34
Monroe	Albia	166.738	268.339		Iowa 5 – Centerville, Knoxville	
Monroe–Wapello county line	Mantua–Polk township line	175.641	282.667		CR T61 – Blakesburg	Former Iowa 213
Wapello	Center Township	184.819	297.437		Albia Road	Former US 34
Wapello	Ottumwa	186.388	299.962		US 34 Bus. east (Quincy Street)	
Wapello	Ottumwa	187.241	301.335		US 63 Bus. north / Iowa 149 north (Wapello Street)	Western end of US 63 Business overlap
Wapello	Ottumwa	187.686– 187.746	302.051– 302.148	—	Church Street, Jefferson Street (US 34 Bus.) – Amtrak station	
Wapello	Ottumwa	188.117	302.745	—	Vine Street	
Wapello	Ottumwa	188.670	303.635		US 63 south / US 63 Bus. ends – Bloomfield	Roundabout; eastern end of US 63 Bus overlap; western end of US 63 overlap
Wapello	Ottumwa	190.038	305.837		US 34 Bus. west (Roemer Avenue)	
Wapello	Ottumwa	190.753– 191.037	306.987– 307.444	191	US 63 north / Iowa 163 west – Oskaloosa	Eastern end of US 63 overlap; western end of Iowa 163 overlap
Wapello	Agency	194.962	313.761	195	CR V37 – Agency, Hedrick	
Wapello	Pleasant Township	198.578	319.580	199	Iowa 16 east / CR V43 north – Eldon	
Jefferson	Batavia	202.688	326.195	203	CR H43 – Batavia	
Jefferson	Locust Grove Township	207.987	334.723		Old Highway 34	Former US 34
Jefferson	Center Township	210.632	338.979	210	US 34 Bus. (Burlington Avenue)	
Jefferson	Fairfield	214.608	345.378	212	Iowa 1 – Fairfield, Keosauqua	
Jefferson	Buchanan Township	217.576	350.155	214	US 34 Bus. (Burlington Avenue)	
Henry	Tippecanoe Township	229.974	370.107		Clayton Avenue – Rome	Former Iowa 123
Henry	Tippecanoe Township	232.385	373.987	229	US 34 Bus. – Mount Pleasant, Westwood	Eastbound exit and westbound entrance only
Henry	Tippecanoe Township	234.322	377.105	231	CR W55 – Mount Pleasant, Westwood	Westbound exit and eastbound entrance only
Henry	Mount Pleasant	237.951	382.945	234	US 218 north / Iowa 27 north (US 218 Business) – Mount Pleasant, Iowa City	
Henry	Mount Pleasant	238.577– 238.911	383.952– 384.490	45	US 218 north / Iowa 27 north	Western end of US 218 / Iowa 27 overlap; westbound exit and eastbound entrance only
Henry	Mount Pleasant	241.026– 241.486	387.894– 388.634	42	US 218 south / Iowa 27 south / US 34 Bus. (US 218 Business) – Keokuk, Mount Pleasant	Eastern end of US 218 / Iowa 27 overlap
Henry	New London Township	246.309	396.396		260th Street	Former US 34
Henry	New London	247.924	398.995	244	CR X22 – New London, Mount Union	
Henry–Des Moines county line	New London–Pleasant Grove township line	250.342	402.886		267th Street	Former US 34
Des Moines	Middletown	259.401	417.465	255	Danville, Middletown	Former US 34
Des Moines	West Burlington	262.564	422.556	258	CR X40 (Beaverdale Road) / to Agency Road	
Des Moines	West Burlington	263.827	424.588	259	Mount Pleasant Street	Former US 34
Des Moines	West Burlington	265.097	426.632	260	Gear Avenue – Bus Depot	
Des Moines	Burlington	266.701	429.214	261	US 61 (Roosevelt Street) – Fort Madison	
Des Moines	Burlington	267.493	430.488	262A	Curran Street	
Des Moines	Burlington	268.351	431.869	262B	Central Avenue, Snake Alley	
Des Moines	Burlington	268.894	432.743	263	CR X99 (Main Street) – Amtrak terminal	Former Iowa 99
Mississippi River		269.111	433.092	Great River Bridge; Iowa–Illinois state line; Iowa 163 ends		
Mississippi River		269.111	433.092		US 34 east – Monmouth, Galesburg	Continuation into Illinois
1.000 mi = 1.609 km; 1.000 km = 0.621 mi: Concurrency terminus; Incomplete access; Tolled

== See also ==
- Special routes of U.S. Route 34

U.S. Route 34
Previous state: Nebraska	Iowa	Next state: Illinois
