= Iowa Highway 163 =

State highway in Iowa, United States

Iowa Highway 163
- Iowa 163 highlighted in red

Route information
- Maintained by Iowa DOT
- Length: 165.902 mi (266.993 km)
- Existed: 1937–present

Major junctions
- West end: US 69 in Des Moines
- I-235 in Des Moines; US 65 in Pleasant Hill; US 63 at Oskaloosa; US 34 at Ottumwa; US 218 / Iowa 27 at Mount Pleasant
- East end: US 34 at Burlington

Location
- Country: United States
- State: Iowa
- Counties: Polk; Jasper; Marion; Mahaska; Wapello; Jefferson; Henry; Des Moines

Highway system
- Iowa Primary Highway System; Interstate; US; State; Secondary; Scenic
← Iowa 160	→ Iowa 165

Iowa Highway 163 (Iowa 163) is a state highway that travels from U.S. Highway 69 in Des Moines to US 63 near Oskaloosa. The Iowa Department of Transportation (Iowa DOT) has signed Iowa 163 from Oskaloosa to Burlington along US 63 and US 34, but it does not officially recognize those sections of road as part of the route.

Iowa 163 is a divided highway with some freeway sections for most of its length and serves as a connector between Des Moines with Burlington.

== Route description ==
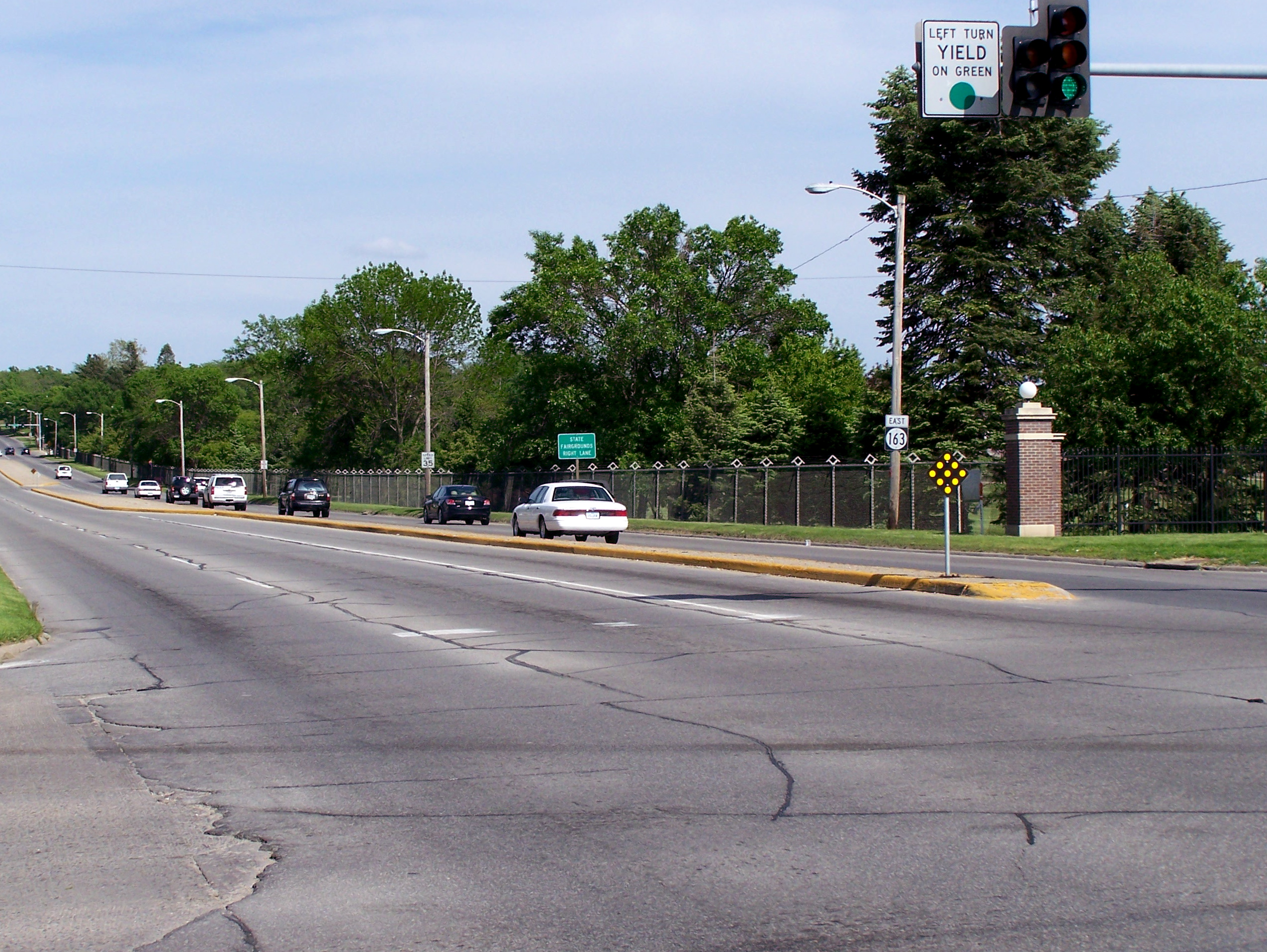
Iowa 163 near the Iowa State Fairgrounds

Iowa Highway 163 begins at the corner of E. 14th Street, which carries U.S. Highway 69 (US 69), and E. University Avenue in Des Moines. It heads east along E. University traveling 3/4 mile (1.2 km) to Interstate 235 (I-235). There is no direct access to eastbound I-235 from eastbound Iowa 163. Traffic must take E. 21st Street to Easton Boulevard to access eastbound I-235. Highway 163 continues east past the Iowa State Fairgrounds on its way to Pleasant Hill where it meets U.S. Highway 65 at a diamond interchange.

It continues east and meets Iowa Highway 117 near Prairie City. It turns southeast and meets Iowa Highway 14 near Monroe. It continues southeast, passes Pella, then continues southeast, meeting Iowa Highway 92 west of Oskaloosa before intersecting U.S. Highway 63 south of that city. The Iowa 163 designation is then extended along U.S. Highway 63 between Oskaloosa and Ottumwa, and U.S. Highway 34 between Ottumwa and Burlington.

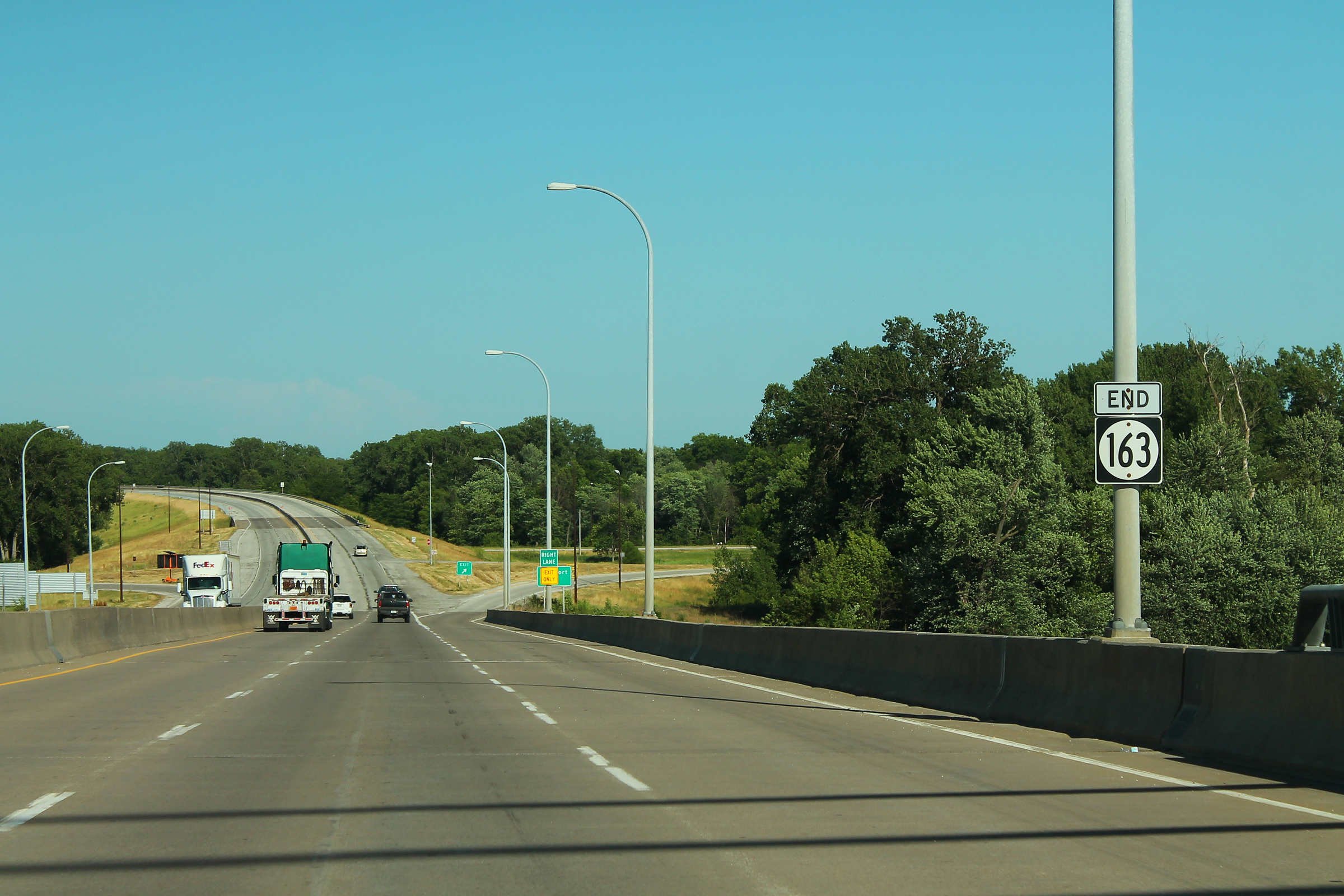
Eastern terminus at Burlington

== History ==
U.S. Highway 163
- Location: Des Moines – Oskaloosa
- Existed: 1934–1937

In 1926, when U.S. Highway 63 was formed, it followed the route of what became Iowa Highway 163. After U.S. 63 was extended north into Minnesota and Wisconsin in 1934, the route then became U.S. Highway 163. In 1937, US 163 was deleted and was replaced by Iowa Highway 163. In 1970, the US 163 designation was reused for an unrelated highway in Utah and Arizona.

Iowa Highway 163 was originally a two-lane road. In the 1970s the highway was divided through Polk County east of Pleasant Hill. During the 1990s, the highway began to emerge from a two-lane highway to a four-lane highway as part of an ongoing project to create a continuous four-lane highway from Des Moines to Burlington. The segments of 163 in rural areas were converted to four lanes, but the main highway still went through the city centers. That would soon change as bypasses were constructed around the towns along the route. The first freeway bypass, with three interchanges, opened around Pella on October 17, 1994. Bypasses of Monroe, Iowa (with two interchanges), Prairie City, Iowa (with one interchange and one turnoff), Otley, Iowa (with two turnoffs), and Oskaloosa, Iowa (with two interchanges) were later constructed. The last four-lane segment opened between Pella and Oskaloosa on September 30, 1999. Today 163 is divided its entire length, except for short stretches of undivided highway in the Des Moines area.

In October 2009, Iowa 163 was extended along the completed freeway from Oskaloosa to Burlington, overlapping both U.S. Highway 63 and U.S. Highway 34.

== Exit list ==
County	Location	mi	km	Exit	Destinations	Notes
Polk	Des Moines	0.000	0.000		US 69 (East 14th Street)	
Polk	Des Moines	0.768	1.236		I-235 west	Westbound only. No direct access to I-235 east from Iowa 163
Polk	Des Moines	0.982	1.580		To I-235 east (E. 21st Street)	
Polk	Des Moines				East 30th Street	Formerly Iowa 46
Polk	Pleasant Hill	5.339	8.592		US 65 – Altoona, Indianola	
Jasper	Prairie City	18.311	29.469	18	Iowa 117 / CR S6G – Prairie City, Colfax	
Jasper	Monroe	25.865	41.626	25	Monroe	
Jasper	Monroe	29.376	47.276	29	Iowa 14 – Monroe, Newton	
Marion	Pella	40.353	64.942	40	Iowa 163 Business / CR G28 – Pella, Lake Red Rock	
Marion	Pella	42.846	68.954	42	Pella	
Marion	Pella	45.064	72.523	44	CR G5T – Pella, New Sharon	
Mahaska	Oskaloosa	57.479	92.503	58	Iowa 92 to US 63 north – Oskaloosa, Knoxville	
Mahaska	Oskaloosa	61.230	98.540	60	US 63 north – Oskaloosa	Western end of US 63 overlap, exit numbers follow US 63
Mahaska	Eddyville	67.518	108.660	54	Marino Avenue	
Wapello	Eddyville	69.260	111.463	53	Iowa 137 south – Eddyville, Albia	
Wapello	Ottumwa	80.402	129.394	42	Ottumwa Regional Airport, Industrial Park	
Wapello	Ottumwa	81.790	131.628	40	US 63 Bus. south / Iowa 149 – Ottumwa	
Wapello	Ottumwa	85.772	138.037	36	Dahlonega Road	
Wapello	Ottumwa	87.494	140.808	35	Pennsylvania Avenue	
Wapello	Ottumwa	88.378	142.231	191	US 34 west / US 63 south – Ottumwa	Eastern end of US 63 overlap; western end of US 34 overlap; exit numbers follow US 34
Wapello	Agency	92.156	148.311	195	CR V37 – Agency, Hedrick	
Wapello	Pleasant Township	95.777	154.138	199	Iowa 16 east / CR V43 north – Eldon	
Jefferson	Batavia	99.879	160.740	203	CR H43 – Batavia	
Jefferson	Fairfield	107.829	173.534	210	US 34 Bus. east (Burlington Avenue)	
Jefferson	Fairfield	111.797	179.920	212	Iowa 1 – Fairfield, Keosauqua	
Jefferson	Fairfield	114.761	184.690	214	US 34 Bus. west (Burlington Avenue)	
Henry	Tippecanoe Township	129.641	208.637	229	US 34 Bus. east – Mount Pleasant, Westwood	Eastbound exit and westbound entrance only
Henry	Tippecanoe Township	131.820	212.144	231	CR W55 – Mount Pleasant, Westwood	Westbound exit and eastbound entrance only
Henry	Mount Pleasant	135.145	217.495	234	To US 218 north / Iowa 27 north (Iowa 438) / US 218 Bus. south – Mount Pleasant	Only access to northbound US 218 from eastbound US 34
Henry	Mount Pleasant	135.867	218.657	45	US 218 north / Iowa 27 north	Western end of US 218 / IA 27 overlap; westbound exit and eastbound entrance only; exit numbers follow US 218
Henry	Mount Pleasant	138.305	222.580	42	US 218 south / Iowa 27 south / US 34 Bus. east / US 218 Bus. – Mount Pleasant, Keokuk	Eastern end of US 218 / IA 27 overlap
Henry	New London	144.888	233.175	244	CR X23 – New London, Mount Union	Exit numbers follow US 34
Des Moines	Danville Township	156.383	251.674	255	Middletown, Danville	
Des Moines	West Burlington	159.550	256.771	258	CR X40 (Beaverdale Road) / Agency Road	
Des Moines	West Burlington	160.824	258.821	259	Mount Pleasant Street	
Des Moines	West Burlington	162.086	260.852	260	Gear Avenue, Bus Depot	
Des Moines	Burlington	163.689	263.432	261	US 61 (Roosevelt Avenue) – Fort Madison	
Des Moines	Burlington	164.481	264.707	262A	Curran Street	
Des Moines	Burlington	165.343	266.094	262B	Central Avenue, Snake Alley	
Des Moines	Burlington	165.902	266.993	263	CR X99 (Main Street)	
Mississippi River		166.270	267.586	Great River Bridge; Iowa–Illinois state line; Iowa 163 ends		
Mississippi River		166.270	267.586		US 34 east – Galesburg	Continuation into Illinois
1.000 mi = 1.609 km; 1.000 km = 0.621 mi: Concurrency terminus; Incomplete access

== Related route ==
Iowa Highway 163 Business
- Location: Pella

Iowa Highway 163 Business serves Pella, following the old alignment of Iowa 163 through Pella.
