= List of historic auto trails in Iowa =

Auto trails in Iowa

Highway names
- Interstates: Interstate X (I-X)
- US Highways: US X
- State: Iowa Highway X (Iowa X)

System links
- Iowa Primary Highway System; Interstate; US; State; Secondary; Scenic

Prior to the primary highway system which exists in the U.S. state of Iowa today, signed highway routes known as auto trails were registered with the Iowa State Highway Commission. Organizations, such as the Lincoln Highway Association, volunteered to sponsor and register certain roads with the highway commission. Each organization chose their colors and designed route markers to guide motorists along the way. Eventually, confusion reigned and the highway commission took action. Beginning in 1920, primary road numbers were assigned to registered routes. Some of these registered routes, most notably the Lincoln Highway, are still famous today, while most have been long forgotten.

== List of auto trails ==
*	Atlantic–Yellowstone–Pacific Highway; National route. Analogous to Iowa Highway 9, U.S. Route 71, U.S. Route 18, U.S. Route 218, and U.S. Route 20
*	Black Diamond Trail; Marshalltown to Cedar Falls; Roughly analogous to Iowa Highway 14 and U.S. Route 20
*	Black Hawk Trail; Davenport to Davenport
*	Black Hills Highway; National Route. Analogous to U.S. Route 18
*	Blue Grass Route; Council Bluffs to Burlington; Counties: Adams 'Analogous to U.S. Route 34
*	Blue J Highway; Lineville to Des Moines; Roughly analogous to U.S. Route 65 and Iowa Highway 14
*	Burlington Way; Burlington to Cresco; Roughly analogous to U.S. Route 61, Iowa Highway 70, U.S. Route 218, Iowa Highway 150, and U.S. Route 63
*	Capitol Highway; Lineville to Des Moines; Analogous to U.S. Route 69
*	Cedar Rapids, Ottumwa, and McGregor Trail; Ottumwa to McGregor; Also known as the Park Highway. Analogous to Iowa Highway 149 and U.S. Route 151
*	Cedar Rapids, Urbana–Independence Short Line; Cedar Rapids to Independence; Roughly analogous to Iowa Highway 150
*	Center Point Motor Club; Cedar Rapids to St. Paul, Minn. Roughly analogous to Iowa Highway 150 and U.S. Route 63
*	Chariton and Leon Short Line; Leon to Chariton; Analogous to U.S. Route 69 and U.S. Route 34
*	Custer Battlefield Highway; Omaha, Nebr. to Glacier National Park; Analogous to Interstate 29 and Iowa Highway 12
*	Daniel Boone Trail; St. Louis, Mo. to St. Paul, Minn. Counties: Boone; Analogous to U.S. Route 63, Iowa Highway 163, Iowa Highway 415, Iowa Highway 17, U.S. Route 30, and U.S. Route 169
*	Denison – Sioux City Cut-Off; Denison to Sioux City
*	Detroit, Lincoln, and Denver Highway; Denver, Colo. to Detroit, Mich.
*	Diagonal Trail; Davenport to Lake Park
*	Diamond Trail; Des Moines to Iowa City; Counties: Benton
*	Eldora – State Center and Colfax Highway; Colfax to Eldora
*	Everett Powers Highway; Des Moines to Knoxville
*	Farmers Highway; Exira to Greenfield
*	Glacier Trail; St. Louis, Mo. to Glacier National Park
*	Golden Rod Highway; Nebraska City, Nebr. to Bedford
*	Grand Line; Lamoni to Hopeville
*	Great White Way; Council Bluffs to Davenport; Counties: Adair; Current routes: U.S. Route 6
*	Green Crescent; Muscatine to Cedar Rapids
*	Hamlin Short Route; Elk Horn to Guthrie Center
*	Harding Highway; Los Angeles, Calif. to Washington, D.C.
*	Hawkeye Cut-Off; Sioux City to Fort Dodge
*	Hawkeye Highway; Sioux City to Dubuque; Counties: Black Hawk; Current routes: U.S. Route 20, U.S. Route 218
*	Herbert Hoover Highway; Iowa City to Lowden
*	Imperial Highway; Sioux Falls, S. Dak. to Lansing
*	Indian Trail; Tama to Eldora
*	I.O.A. Short Line; Council Bluffs to Davenport
*	Jefferson Highway; New Orleans, La. to Winnipeg, Man.
*	John D. Parmalee Trail; Des Moines to Pleasantville
*	King's Highway; Cedar Rapids to Davenport
*	Lincoln Hawkeye Pike; Clinton to West Union
*	Lincoln Highway; San Francisco, Calif. to New York, N.Y.
*	Lineville–Indianola Short Line; Lineville to Indianola
*	Marshalltown–Colfax Short Line; Colfax to Marshalltown
*	Marysville–Carroll Trail (M.C. Trail); Maryville, Mo. to Carroll
*	Mississippi Valley Highway; Louisiana to Minnesota; Followed the same route as the Burlington Way.
*	Muscatine – Des Moines Short Line; Des Moines to Muscatine
*	National Parks Pike; Yellowstone National Park to Madison, Wis.
*	Okoboji Trail; Des Moines to Arnolds Park
*	Old Military Trail; Charles City to McGregor
*	Perry Pike; Guthrie Center to Ogden
*	Pershing Way; New Orleans, La. to Winnipeg, Man.
*	Rainbow Trail; Hawarden to Dubuque
*	Red Ball Route; St. Louis, Mo. to St. Paul, Minn.
*	Red Line Route; Missouri state line to Villisca
*	Red X Route — 87 miles (140 km); Iowa City to Dubuque; Current routes: Iowa Highway 1 and U.S. Route 151; Passed through Iowa City, Mount Vernon, Anamosa, Monticello, and Dubuque
*	River to River Route; Council Bluffs to Davenport; Counties: Audubon
*	Southwest Trails; Kansas City, Mo. to Chicago, Ill. Counties: Appanoose; Current routes: Iowa Highway 5
*	Star Route; Osceola to Des Moines
*	Tall Corn Route; Sioux City to McGregor
*	Tourists Route; Mount Ayr to Des Moines
*	Washington Highway; Seattle, Wash. to Washington, D.C.
*	Waubonsie Trail; Nebraska City, Nebr. to Keokuk
*	Webster Trail; Keokuk to Mt. Pleasant
*	Whiteway–7–Highway; Omaha, Nebr. to Chicago, Ill.
*	Wilson Highway; Missouri state line to Emmons, Minn.
*	Woodward–Ogden Cut-Off; Des Moines to Ogden
