= List of U.S. Highways in Iowa =

United States Numbered Highways of the Iowa Primary Highway System
- Highway markers from different years for former US 32 (1926), US 75 (1961) and current US 151 (1971)
- U.S. Highways in Iowa highlighted in red

System information
- Length: 3,627 mi (5,837 km)
- Formed: November 11, 1926

Highway names
- US Highways: US Highway nn (US nn)

System links
- Iowa Primary Highway System; Interstate; US; State; Secondary; Scenic

== Mainline routes ==
Number	Length (mi)	Length (km)	Southern or western terminus	Northern or eastern terminus	Formed	Removed	Notes
US 6	322.454	518.939	I-480 / US-6 at Omaha, Neb.	I-74 / US 6 at Moline, Ill.	1931	current	
US 18	311.750	501.713	US 18 near Canton, S.D.	US 18 / WIS 60 at McGregor	1926	current	
US 20	300.270	483.238	I-129 / US-20 / US-75 at South Sioux City, Neb.	US 20 at East Dubuque, Ill.	1926	current	
US 30	330.856	532.461	US-30 at Blair, Neb.	US 30 at Fulton, Ill.	1926	current	
US 32	322	518	US 30 / US 75 in Council Bluffs	US 32 at Davenport	1926	1931	Replaced by US 6
US 34	269.111	433.092	US-34 near Plattsmouth, Neb.	US 34 at Gulfport, Ill.	1926	current	
US 52	173.722	279.578	US 52 / IL 64 at Savanna, Ill.	US 52 near Burr Oak	1935	current	
US 55	225	362	US 61 in Davenport	US 55 near Burr Oak	1926	1935	Replaced by US 52 and US 67
US 59	215.191	346.316	US 59 near Shenandoah	US 59 near Worthington, MN	1934	current	
US 61	192.663	310.061	US 61 / US 136 at Keokuk	US 61 / US 151 at Dubuque	1926	current	
US 63	237.758	382.634	US 63 near Lancaster, Mo.	US 63 near Chester	1926	current	
US 65	221.618	356.660	US 65 at Lineville	US 65 near Gordonsville, Minn.	1926	current	
US 67	55.275	88.956	US 67 at Davenport	US 52 / Iowa 64 near Sabula	1934	current	
US 69	227.257	365.735	US 69 near Lamoni	US 69 at Emmons, Minn.	1926	current	
US 71	231.329	372.288	US 71 at Braddyville	US 71 near Spirit Lake	1926	current	
US 75	80.010	128.764	I-129 / US-20 / US-75 at South Sioux City, Neb.	US 75 near Rock Rapids	1926	current	
US 77	0.314	0.505	US 77 / US 20 Bus. at South Sioux City, Neb.	I-29 / US 20 Bus. in Sioux City	1929	current	
US 136	3.591	5.779	US 61 / US 136 at Keokuk	US 136 at Keokuk	1951	current	
US 151	108.151	174.052	I-80 near the Amana Colonies	US 61 / US 151 at Dubuque	1938	current	
US 161	185	298	US 61 in Keokuk	US 61 in Key West	1926	1938	Replaced by US 218 and US 151
US 163	60	97	US 65 / US 69 in Des Moines	US 63 in Oskaloosa	1934	1937	Replaced by Iowa 163
US 169	234.956	378.125	US 169 near Redding	US 169 near Lakota	1930	current	
US 218	274.592	441.913	US 61 / US 136 in Keokuk	US 218 near St. Ansgar	1926	current	
US 275	59.158	95.206	US 275 near Hamburg	US-275 / N-92 at Council Bluffs	1932	current	

== Special routes ==
Number	Length (mi)	Length (km)	Southern or western terminus	Northern or eastern terminus	Formed	Removed	Notes
City US 6	10.2	16.4	US 6 in Des Moines	US 6 / US 65 in Des Moines	1934	1968	Former routing of US 6
US 18 Bus.	10.752	17.304	I-35 / US 18 / Iowa 122 in Clear Lake	US 18 / US 65 in Mason City	1998	current	Serves the Mason City area
US 18 Bus.	4.149	6.677	US 18 / Iowa 76 near McGregor	US 18 / Iowa 76 in Marquette	1989	current	Serves McGregor and Marquette; former routing of US 18
US 20 Bus.	—	—	US 77 / US 20 Bus. at South Sioux City, Neb.	US 20 / US 75 at Sioux City	1979	current	Serves Sioux City area; former routing of US 20
US 20 Bus.	—	—	US 20 west of Fort Dodge	US 20 east of Fort Dodge	1996	current	Serves Fort Dodge; former routing of US 20
US 30 Alt.	—	—	US 30 Alt. at Omaha, Neb.	US 30 in Missouri Valley	1939	1969	Former routing of US 30
US 30 Alt.	—	—	US 30 / US 169 in Ogden	US 30 near Marshalltown	1973	1981	Former routing of US 30; became Iowa 930
US 30 Alt.	—	—	US 30 / US 67 in Clinton	US 30 Alt. at Fulton, Ill.	1956	1967	Former routing of US 30
US 30 Bus.	—	—	US 30 southwest of Marshalltown	US 30 in southeastern Marshalltown	1996	current	Serves Marshalltown; former routing of US 30
US 30 Bus.	—	—	US 30 west of Toledo	US 30 east of Tama	2011	current	Serves Tama and Toledo; former routing of US 30
US 34 Bus.	—	—	I-29 / US 34 near Pacific Junction	US 34 / US 275 in Glenwood	1974	2003	Former routing of US 34
US 34 Bus.	—	—	US 34 west of Chariton	US 34 east of Chariton	1996	current	Serves Chariton; former routing of US 34
US 34 Bus.	—	—	US 34 in southwestern Ottumwa	US 34 / US 63 in eastern Ottumwa	1968	current	Serves Ottumwa
US 34 Bus.	—	—	US 34 / Iowa 163 west of Fairfield	US 34 / Iowa 163 east of Fairfield	2008	current	Serves Fairfield; former routing of US 34
US 34 Bus.	—	—	US 34 / Iowa 163 near Westwood	US 34 / US 218 / Iowa 27 / Iowa 163 at Mount Pleasant	2005	current	Serves Mount Pleasant area; former routing of US 34
US 52 Alt.	—	—	US 52 / US 61 / US 151 in Dubuque	US 52 / Iowa 3 in Luxemburg	1964	1967	Original routing of US 52; mainline US 52 traffic diverted to allow for repairs on the alternate route
US 61 Bus.	5.931	9.545	US 61 / US 136 in southwestern Keokuk	US 61 / US 218 in northwestern Keokuk	1959	current	Serves Keokuk; former routing of US 61
US 61 Bus.	9.075	14.605	US 61 / Iowa 2 west of Fort Madison	US 61 northeast of Fort Madison	2011	current	Serves Fort Madison; former routing of US 61
US 61 Bus.	5.407	8.702	US 61 / Iowa 92 in southwestern Muscatine	US 61 / Iowa 22 / Iowa 38 / Iowa 92 in northeastern Muscatine	1984	current	Serves Muscatine; former routing of US 61
US 61 Bus.	10.924	17.580	I-280 / US 61 west of Davenport	I-80 / US 61 in northern Davenport	2010	current	Serves Davenport; former routing of US 61
US 61 Bus.	2.55	4.10	US 61 in southern Maquoketa	US 61 / Iowa 64 in western Maquoketa	1998	current	Serves Maquoketa; unsigned
US 63 Bus.	6.426	10.342	US 34 / US 63 in southeastern Ottumwa	US 34 / Iowa 149 / Iowa 163 north of Ottumwa	2007	current	Serves Ottumwa; former routing of US 63
US 63 Bus.	—	—	US 18 / US 63 south of New Hampton	US 63 north of New Hampton	2002	current	Serves New Hampton; former routing of US 63
US 71 Bus.	—	—	US 71 / Iowa 2 south of Clarinda	US 71 east of Clarinda	1973	current	Serves Clarinda; former routing of US 71
US 71 Bus.	—	—	US 71 / Iowa 7 at Storm Lake	US 71 near Truesdale	1996	current	Serves Storm Lake; former routing of US 71
US 75 Bus.	10.334	16.631	I-29 / US 20 / US 75 south of Sioux City	US 75 north of Sioux City	2001	current	Serves Sioux City; former routing of US 75
US 75 Bus.	3.082	4.960	US 75 west of Le Mars	US 75 / Iowa 60 north of Le Mars	2001	current	Serves Le Mars; partial former routing of US 75
US 151 Bus.	12.7	20.4	US 30 / US 151 / US 218 near Fairfax	US 151 / Iowa 13 in Marion	1989	current	Serves Cedar Rapids and Marion; former routing of US 151
US 151 Bus.	—	—	US 151 south of Monticello	US 151 north of Monticello	2004	current	Serves Monticello; former routing of US 151
US 151 Bus.	—	—	US 151 west of Cascade	US 151 north of Cascade	2004	current	Serves Cascade; former routing of US 151
US 169 Bus.	3.147	5.065	US 169 / US 20 Business in Fort Dodge	US 169 in Fort Dodge	1990	current	Serves Fort Dodge; former routing of US 169
US 218 Bus.	12.7	20.4	US 34 / US 218 / Iowa 27 / Iowa 163 east of Mount Pleasant	US 218 / Iowa 27 north of Mount Pleasant	2003	current	Serves Mount Pleasant; partial former routing of US 218
US 218 Bus.	—	—	US 218 south of Waverly	US 218 north of Waverly	1998	current	Serves Waverly; former routing of US 218
US 218 Bus.	—	—	US 18 / US 218 south of Charles City	US 18 / US 218 north of Charles City	2000	current	Serves Charles City; former routing of US 218
