= Great River Bridge =

- Coordinates: 40°48′43″N 91°05′44″W
- Carries: 5 lanes of US 34 (entire span) / Iowa 163 (Iowa side only)
- Crosses: Mississippi River
- Locale: Burlington, Iowa and Gulfport, Illinois
- Maintained by: Iowa Department of Transportation

Characteristics
- Design: Cable-stayed bridge
- Total length: 1,245 ft (379 m)
- Width: 27 ft (8 m)
- Longest span: 660 ft (201 m)
- Clearance below: 60 ft (18 m)

History
- Opened: October 4, 1993

The Great River Bridge is an asymmetrical, single tower cable-stayed bridge over the Mississippi River. It carries U.S. Route 34 from Burlington, Iowa to the town of Gulfport, Illinois.

== History ==
Construction began in 1989, but work on the main tower did not begin until April 1990. The main tower is 370 feet (113 m) in height from the top of the tower to the riverbed. During the Great Flood of 1993, construction continued despite record crests on the Mississippi below. The final cost of the bridge was $49 million, about 16 percent over budget.

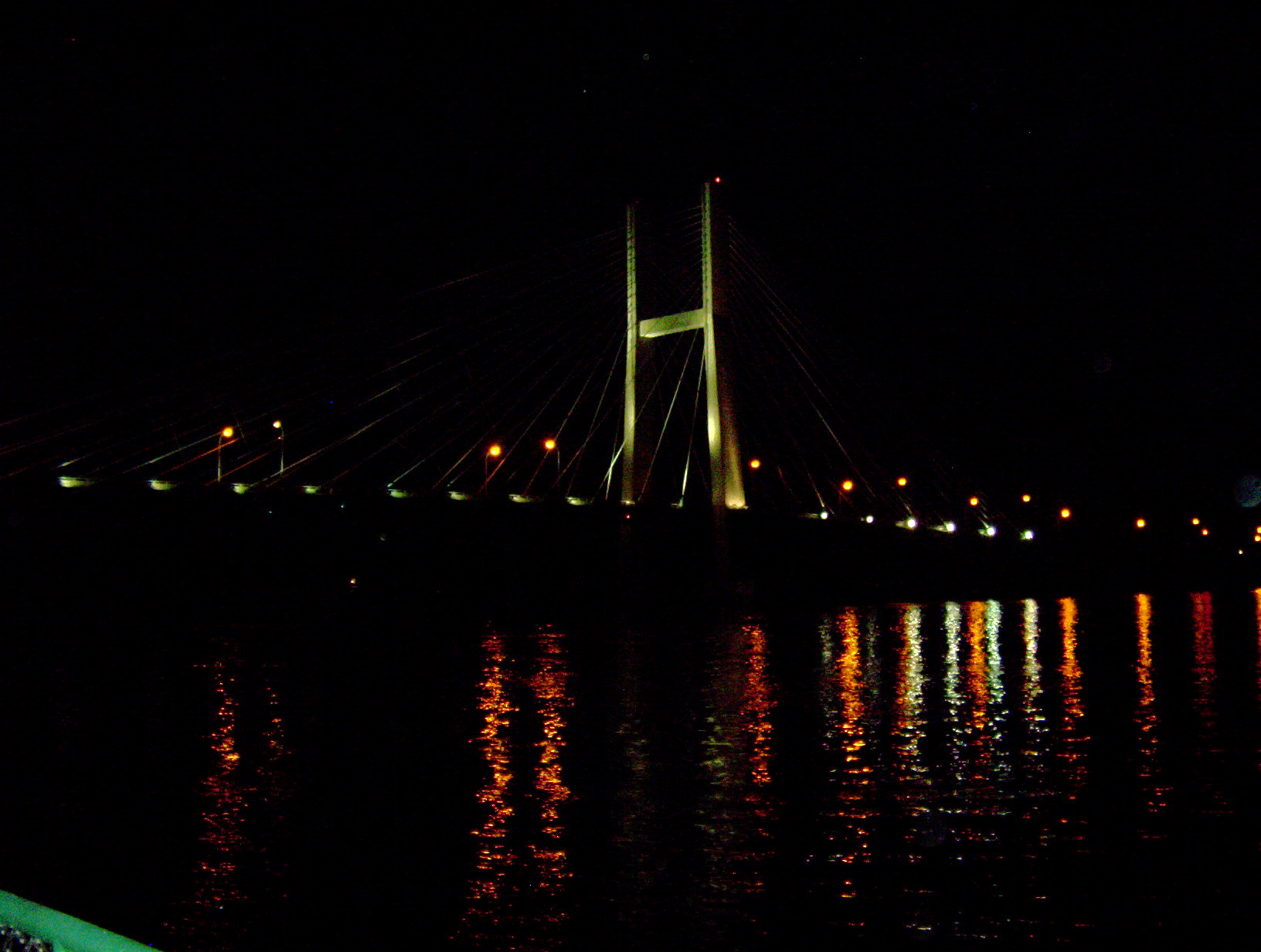
A night view of the bridge

The Great River Bridge replaced the MacArthur Bridge, an aging two-lane, cantilevered, steel toll bridge built in 1917. At the time, the bridge was in desperate need of repair, or replacement, as it swayed ominously when two semis crossed the bridge at the same time on the two lanes of traffic. After the bridge was dismantled, the engineers discovered that the supports weren't sunk into the bedrock far enough, causing undermining of the piers. The new bridge is five lanes wide (two westbound, three eastbound), with piers sunk over 90 feet into bedrock, and provides a safer crossing across the Mississippi River than the old bridge.

== Events ==
In the early morning of May 1, 2008, five barges broke loose of their moorings, with two of those striking the easternmost pylon of the bridge on the Henderson County, Illinois side of the river. The bridge was closed while it could be inspected by the Iowa Department of Transportation for damage and repairs. A third barge continued downstream, striking the BNSF Railroad owned Burlington Rail Bridge. The highway bridge was reopened the following day.

On June 17, 2008, the bridge was closed due to major flooding of the Mississippi River. The Illinois side was damaged in the floods due to levee failure, trapping people who were rescued by helicopter, and decreasing population in Gulfport for the long term.

Every year on the second Saturday of May the Great River Bridge Race is run. The 6-mile (9.7 km) race starts at the Iowa on ramp and runs the first mile in Iowa including running up Snake Alley. It then runs across the bridge through Illinois on U.S. Route 34 and finishes on Front St. in front of the Port of Burlington.

== See also ==
- List of crossings of the Upper Mississippi River
