= U.S. Route 34 =

Highway in the United States

U.S. Route 34
- US 34 highlighted in red

Route information
- Length: 1,122 mi (1,806 km)
- Existed: 1926–present

Major junctions
- West end: US 40 at Granby, CO
- I-25 / US 87 near Loveland, CO; I-76 / US 6 near Wiggins, CO; I-80 / US 281 near Grand Island, NE; I-80 / I-180 / US 77 at Lincoln, NE; I-29 / US 275 near Glenwood, IA; I-35 near Osceola, IA; I-74 in Galesburg, IL; I-39 / US 51 in Mendota, IL; I-88 / I-355 in Downers Grove, IL; I-294 at Western Springs, IL
- East end: IL 43 at Berwyn, IL

Location
- Country: United States
- States: Colorado, Nebraska, Iowa, Illinois

Highway system
- United States Numbered Highway System; List; Special; Divided
← US 33	→ US 35

U.S. Route 34 (US 34) is an east–west United States highway that runs for 1,122 miles (1,806 km) from north-central Colorado to the western suburbs of Chicago. Through Rocky Mountain National Park it is known as the Trail Ridge Road where it reaches an elevation of 12,183 feet (3,713 m), making it the highest paved through highway in the United States. The highway's western terminus is Granby, Colorado at US 40. Its eastern terminus is in Berwyn, Illinois at Illinois Route 43.

U.S. Route 34 becomes a toll road for a short distance in Colorado, where it passes through Rocky Mountain National Park.

== Route description ==
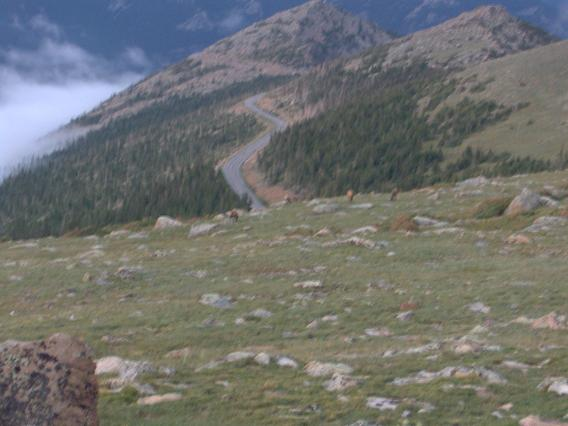
View of US 34 in Rocky Mountain National Park, from an elevation above 11,000 feet (3,400 m)

=== Colorado ===
In the state of Colorado, U.S. Route 34 runs north from Granby through Rocky Mountain National Park. It passes through Estes Park, Loveland, and Greeley before entering Nebraska east of Wray.

Within Rocky Mountain National Park US 34 is known as Trail Ridge Road. Due to its high elevation through the park and over the Continental Divide, Route 34 closes entirely in winter from the Colorado River Trailhead on the west (10 miles north of the Grand Lake entrance) to Many Parks Curve on the east (8 miles from the Estes Park entrance.) Closure runs roughly from mid-October to Memorial Day weekend in May, and can occur at any time in summer due to high alpine snow storms.

Route 34 transverses Fall River Pass and Milner Pass in the Front Range of Colorado.

=== Nebraska ===
In the state of Nebraska, U.S. Route 34 is a major east–west arterial surface road along the southern portion of Nebraska. It enters Nebraska west of Haigler and overlaps other routes for the majority of its routing. U.S. 34 passes through Hastings, Grand Island, Seward, and Lincoln before entering Iowa between Plattsmouth and Bellevue.

U.S. Route 34 from between Hastings and Grand Island is known as the Tom Osborne Expressway, which is named for the former Hastings resident, Nebraska Cornhuskers football coach, and Congressman. In Lincoln, U.S. 34 overlaps with Interstate 180 from its junction with Interstate 80 into downtown where it becomes North 9th/North 10th Streets, then east as "O" Street. Also, the segment from the Lancaster County/Cass County border to Nebraska Highway 1 south of Elmwood is the Bess Streeter Aldrich Memorial Highway, after the former author and Elmwood resident.

=== Iowa ===
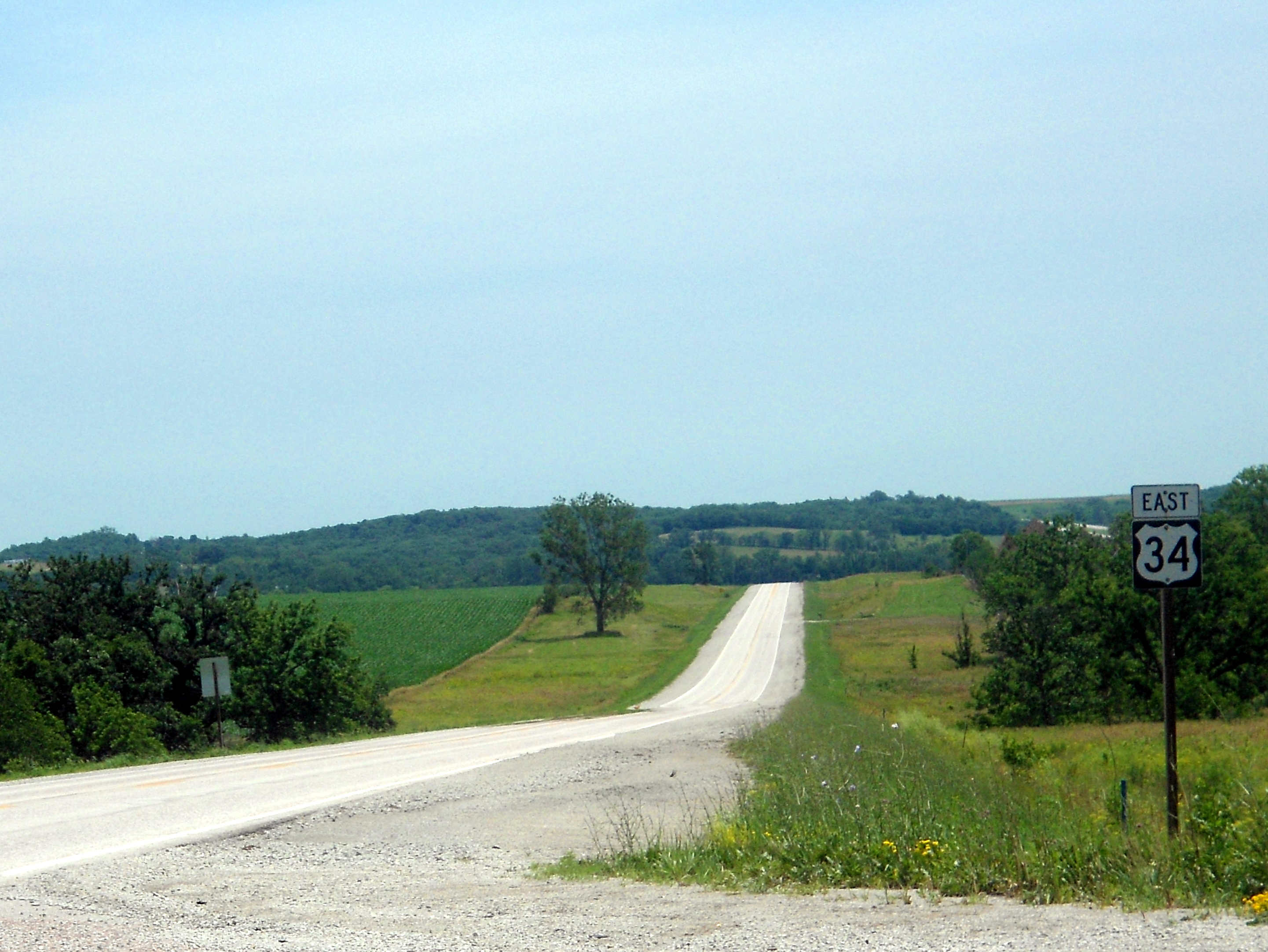
US 34 near its junction with US 71, Montgomery County, Iowa.

In the state of Iowa, U.S. Route 34 is a major east–west arterial surface road across southern Iowa. It enters Iowa west of Glenwood and then passes through Glenwood, Red Oak, Corning, and Creston before intersecting Interstate 35 at Osceola. East of Osceola, it continues through Chariton and Georgetown then onto Albia before meeting U.S. Route 63 at a traffic circle in Ottumwa.

East of Ottumwa to Burlington, the highway overlaps Iowa Highway 163. This segment of highway is an expressway with some freeway segments. As of November 12, 2008, it bypasses Fairfield and then bypasses Mt. Pleasant, with a portion of this also concurrent with US-218 and Iowa 27, which is also the Iowa route for the Avenue of the Saints. It then continues southeast towards Burlington bypassing New London and then Danville and Middletown. The freeway segment through Burlington was completed in the 1970s. It then crosses the Mississippi River on the Great River Bridge into Illinois which was completed in the early 1990s. In 2015, a 15-mile segment of U.S. Route 34 in Montgomery and Adams counties won the Sheldon G. Hayes Award for the highest quality asphalt pavement in the nation.

Much of this route was originally known as the Bluegrass Highway and parallels tracks of what was originally the Burlington and Missouri River Railroad and is now the BNSF. Amtrak's California Zephyr passenger rail service also parallels this route.

U.S. 34 in the state of Iowa is officially designated the Red Bull Highway in honor of the 34th Infantry (Red Bull) Division.

=== Illinois ===
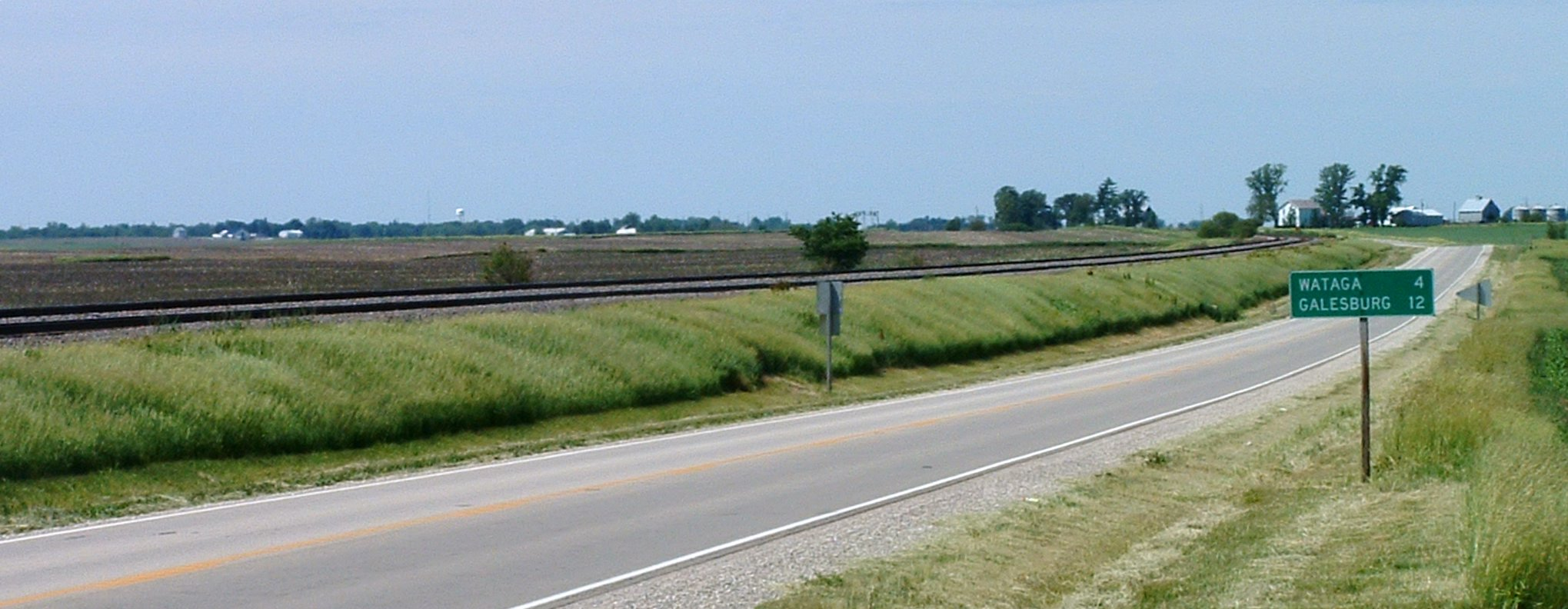
U.S. 34 in western Illinois

In the state of Illinois, U.S. Route 34 enters at the Mississippi River across from Burlington, Iowa. It passes through or around the cities of Monmouth, Galesburg, Kewanee, Princeton, Mendota, Yorkville, Oswego, Aurora, Naperville, Lisle, Downers Grove, Westmont, Clarendon Hills, Hinsdale, Western Springs, La Grange, Brookfield, Lyons and Riverside and continues in a largely southwest-northeast direction to its eastern terminus at Illinois Route 43 and Historic US 66 in Berwyn. Through much of the Chicago area, the highway is known as "Ogden Avenue", after William Butler Ogden, Chicago's first mayor. The entire highway in Illinois is named the Walter Payton Memorial Highway after Pro Football Hall of Famer Walter Payton, who wore #34 for the Chicago Bears. The highway is 211.37 miles (340.17 km) long within the state.

== Major intersections ==
Colorado
US 40 in Granby
US 36 in Deer Ridge Junction
US 36 in Estes Park
US 287 in Loveland
I-25 / US 87 in Loveland
US 85 in Evans. The highways travel concurrently to Greeley.
I-76 / US 6 northeast of Wiggins. The highways travel concurrently to west-southwest of Log Lane Village.
US 385 in Wray
Nebraska
US 6 west of Culbertson. The highways travel concurrently to Hastings.
US 83 in McCook. The highways travel concurrently through the city.
US 283 in Arapahoe
US 136 north-northwest of Edison
US 183 in Holdrege
US 281 in Hastings. The highways travel concurrently to Grand Island.
I-80 south of Grand Island
US 81 in York. The highways travel concurrently to north of York.
I-80 / I-180 / US 77 in Lincoln. I-180/US 34 travels concurrently through the city.
US 75 east of Union. The highways travel concurrently to north-northwest of La Platte.
Iowa
I-29 / US 275 north-northwest of Pacific Junction. US 34/US 275 travels concurrently to east-southeast of Glenwood.
US 59 north of Emerson
US 71 north of Villisca
US 169 in Afton. The highways travel concurrently to west of Thayer.
I-35 in Osceola
US 69 in Osceola
US 65 in Lucas. The highways travel concurrently through the city.
US 63 in Ottumwa. The highways travel concurrently to east of Ottumwa.
US 218 north of Mt. Pleasant. The highways travel concurrently to Mt. Pleasant.
US 61 in Burlington
Illinois
US 67 south-southwest of Monmouth. The highways travel concurrently to Monmouth.
US 150 in Galesburg
I-74 in Galesburg
US 6 west of Sheffield. The highways travel concurrently to Princeton.
US 52 in Mendota
I-39 / US 51 east of Mendota
US 30 on the Oswego–Montgomery city line. The highways travel concurrently one block.
I-355 on the Lisle–Downers Grove city line
I-294 on the Hinsdale–Western Springs city line
US 12 / US 20 / US 45 in La Grange
IL 43 on the Riverside–Lyons–Berwyn city line

== Related routes ==
Special routes of U.S. Route 34

Browse numbered routes
← SH 30	list	→ SH 35
← N-33	NE	→ N-35
← Iowa 31	IA	→ I-35
← IL 33	IL	→ IL 34
