= New London Township, Henry County, Iowa =

Township in Henry County, Iowa, U.S.

Coordinates: 40°57′N 91°26′W

New London Township is a township in Henry County, Iowa, USA. The population of New London Township is 2,806 and spans for 36.3 square miles.
