= Batavia, Iowa =

- City
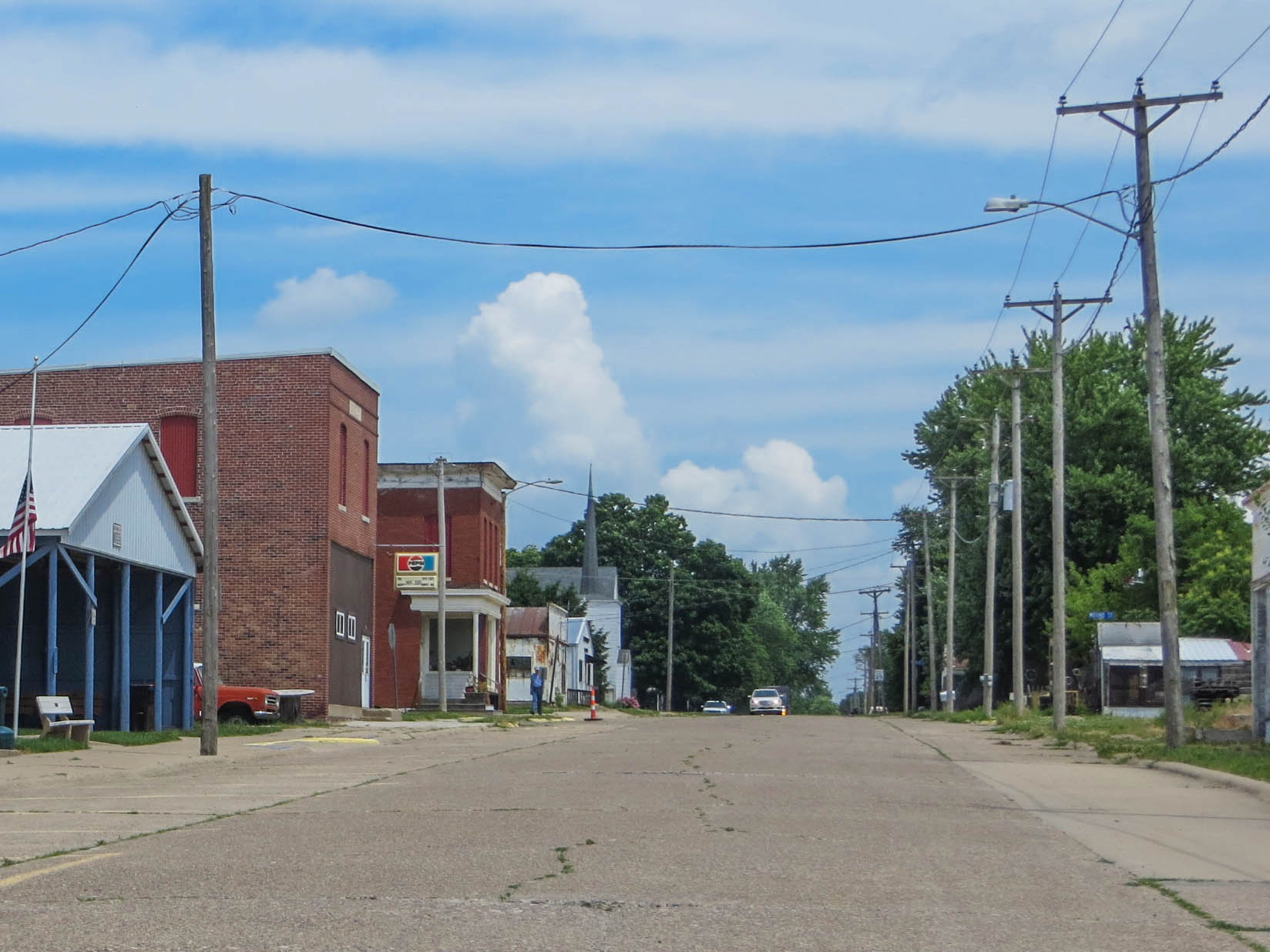
- Downtown Batavia

- Location of Batavia, Iowa

- Location within Iowa Location within the United States Location within North America
- Coordinates: 40°59′42″N 92°10′04″W
- Country: United States
- State: Iowa
- County: Jefferson

Area
  - Total: 0.61 sq mi (1.59 km^{2})
  - Land: 0.61 sq mi (1.59 km^{2})
  - Water: 0 sq mi (0.00 km^{2})
- Elevation: 758 ft (231 m)

Population (2020)
  - Total: 430
  - Density: 698/sq mi (269.6/km^{2})
- Time zone: UTC-6 (Central (CST))
  - Summer (DST): UTC-5 (CDT)
- ZIP code: 52533
- Area code: 641
- FIPS code: 19-04825
- GNIS feature ID: 2394078
- Website: cityofbatavia.com

Batavia is a city in Jefferson County, Iowa, United States. The population was 430 at the 2020 census. It was established in 1846.

== Geography ==
According to the United States Census Bureau, the city has a total area of 0.60 square miles (1.55 km^{2}), all land.

== Demographics ==
Historical populations
Year	Pop.	±%
1870	310	—
1880	328	+5.8%
1890	307	−6.4%
1900	533	+73.6%
1910	560	+5.1%
1920	560	+0.0%
1930	478	−14.6%
1940	474	−0.8%
1950	524	+10.5%
1960	533	+1.7%
1970	525	−1.5%
1980	525	+0.0%
1990	520	−1.0%
2000	500	−3.8%
2010	499	−0.2%
2020	430	−13.8%
Source:"U.S. Census website". United States Census Bureau. and Iowa Data Center; Source: U.S. Decennial Census

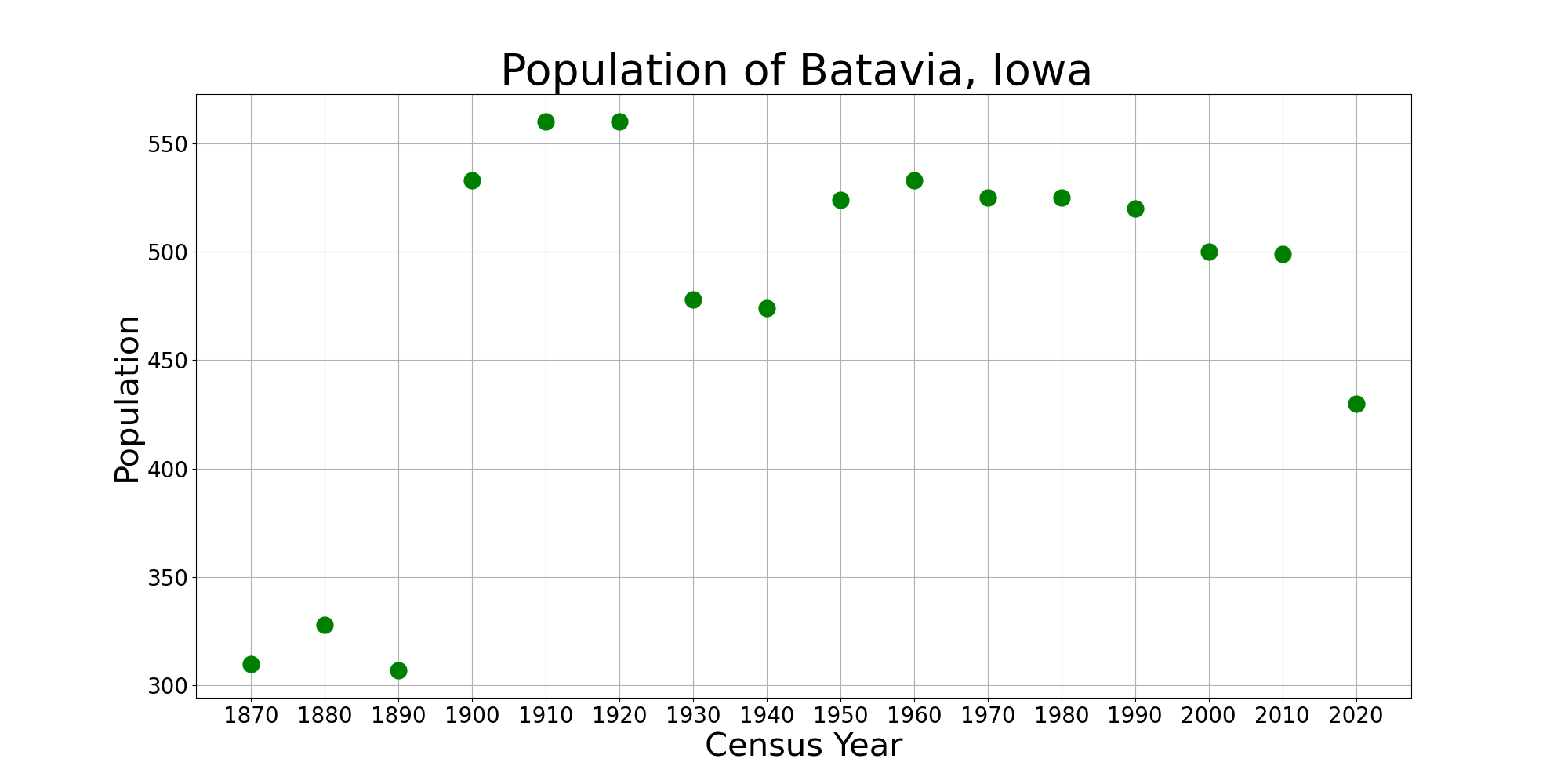
The population of Batavia, Iowa from US census data

=== 2020 census ===
As of the census of 2020, there were 430 people, 203 households, and 119 families residing in the city. The population density was 698.3 inhabitants per square mile (269.6/km^{2}). There were 215 housing units at an average density of 349.1 per square mile (134.8/km^{2}). The racial makeup of the city was 94.9% White, 0.7% Black or African American, 0.0% Native American, 0.2% Asian, 0.0% Pacific Islander, 0.5% from other races and 3.7% from two or more races. Hispanic or Latino persons of any race comprised 2.6% of the population.

Of the 203 households, 27.6% of which had children under the age of 18 living with them, 41.4% were married couples living together, 9.4% were cohabitating couples, 23.6% had a female householder with no spouse or partner present and 25.6% had a male householder with no spouse or partner present. 41.4% of all households were non-families. 36.5% of all households were made up of individuals, 14.8% had someone living alone who was 65 years old or older.

The median age in the city was 43.8 years. 24.2% of the residents were under the age of 20; 4.7% were between the ages of 20 and 24; 22.8% were from 25 and 44; 28.6% were from 45 and 64; and 19.8% were 65 years of age or older. The gender makeup of the city was 48.6% male and 51.4% female.

=== 2010 census ===
As of the census of 2010, there were 499 people, 216 households, and 137 families living in the city. The population density was 831.7 inhabitants per square mile (321.1/km^{2}). There were 236 housing units at an average density of 393.3 per square mile (151.9/km^{2}). The racial makeup of the city was 99.2% White, 0.2% Native American, 0.2% from other races, and 0.4% from two or more races. Hispanic or Latino of any race were 3.6% of the population.

There were 216 households, of which 30.6% had children under the age of 18 living with them, 47.7% were married couples living together, 10.6% had a female householder with no husband present, 5.1% had a male householder with no wife present, and 36.6% were non-families. 32.9% of all households were made up of individuals, and 11.5% had someone living alone who was 65 years of age or older. The average household size was 2.31 and the average family size was 2.85.

The median age in the city was 40.4 years. 23.8% of residents were under the age of 18; 8.2% were between the ages of 18 and 24; 24.2% were from 25 to 44; 28.6% were from 45 to 64; and 15% were 65 years of age or older. The gender makeup of the city was 45.9% male and 54.1% female.

=== 2000 census ===
As of the census of 2000, there were 500 people, 219 households, and 139 families living in the city. The population density was 844.6 inhabitants per square mile (326.1/km^{2}). There were 234 housing units at an average density of 395.3 per square mile (152.6/km^{2}). The racial makeup of the city was 98.60% White, 0.40% Native American, 0.21% Asian, 0.20% from other races, and 0.60% from two or more races. Hispanic or Latino of any race were 1.80% of the population.

There were 219 households, out of which 29.2% had children under the age of 18 living with them, 56.6% were married couples living together, 5.0% had a female householder with no husband present, and 36.1% were non-families. 31.5% of all households were made up of individuals, and 14.2% had someone living alone who was 65 years of age or older. The average household size was 2.28 and the average family size was 2.88.

In the city, the population was spread out, with 23.2% under the age of 18, 6.0% from 18 to 24, 30.6% from 25 to 44, 24.2% from 45 to 64, and 16.0% who were 65 years of age or older. The median age was 41 years. For every 100 females, there were 96.1 males. For every 100 females age 18 and over, there were 89.2 males.

The median income for a household in the city was $33,333, and the median income for a family was $39,063. Males had a median income of $28,125 versus $21,319 for females. The per capita income for the city was $18,970. None of the families and 3.5% of the population were living below the poverty line, including no under eighteens and 12.0% of those over 64.

== Notable person ==
- David Miller, lawyer, farmer, businessman, and politician, was born in Batavia.
