= Special routes of U.S. Route 34 =

Special routes of U.S. Route 34

Highway system
- United States Numbered Highway System; List; Special; Divided

Seven special routes of U.S. Route 34 have existed and are found in Colorado and Iowa.

== Estes Park business route ==
U.S. Highway 34 Business
- Location: Estes Park
- Length: 1.690 mi (2.720 km)
- Existed: 1964–present

U.S. Highway 34 Business serves Estes Park, Colorado. Both of its termini are at US 34. The business route splits from the main route east of the Rocky Mountain National Park Fall River Entrance Station, in the western city limits of Estes Park and enters town on West Elkhorn Avenue. The main route continues around the northern edge of Estes park on Wonderview Avenue, passing a large number of motels. At Moraine Avenue, It joins US 36 in downtown Estes Park. It returns to US 34 after about 1.7 miles (2.7 km) at an intersection with Wonderview Avenue, Big Thompson Avenue, and North St. Vrain Avenue. The business route was established in 1964.

The entire route is in Estes Park, Larimer County.

mi	km	Destinations	Notes
0.000	0.000	US 34 (Wonderview Avenue)	Western terminus
1.306	2.102	US 36 west (Moraine Avenue)	West end of US 36 overlap
1.690	2.720	US 34 (Wonderview Avenue/Big Thompson Avenue) / US 36 east (St. Vrain Avenue) to SH 7 – Loveland, Greeley	Eastern terminus; east end of US 36 overlap
1.000 mi = 1.609 km; 1.000 km = 0.621 mi: Concurrency terminus

== Greeley business route ==
U.S. Highway 34 Business
- Location: Greeley, Colorado

U.S. Highway 34 Business serves Greeley, Colorado. Both Termini are at US 34. It leaves US 34 and becomes 10th Street in Greeley. It splits off into two parallel one way streets until it intersects US 85 Business/8th Avenue. US 34 Business is then concurrent with US 85 Business heading south for around 1 mile until US 34 Business turns east on 18th Street, and continues until it meets US 34 again.

== Glenwood business route ==
U.S. Highway 34 Business
- Location: Glenwood, Iowa
- Existed: 1974–2003

== Chariton business route ==
U.S. Highway 34 Business
- Location: Chariton, Iowa

== Ottumwa business route ==
U.S. Highway 34 Business
- Location: Ottumwa, Iowa

== Fairfield business route ==
U.S. Highway 34 Business
- Location: Fairfield, Iowa

== Westwood–Mount Pleasant business route ==
U.S. Highway 34 Business
- Location: Westwood to Mount Pleasant, Iowa
