= Pleasant Township, Wapello County, Iowa =

Township in Wapello County, Iowa, U.S.

Coordinates: 41.034°N 92.233°W

Pleasant Township is a township in Wapello County, Iowa, United States.

== History ==
Pleasant Township was organized in 1844.
