= Emerson, Iowa =

- City
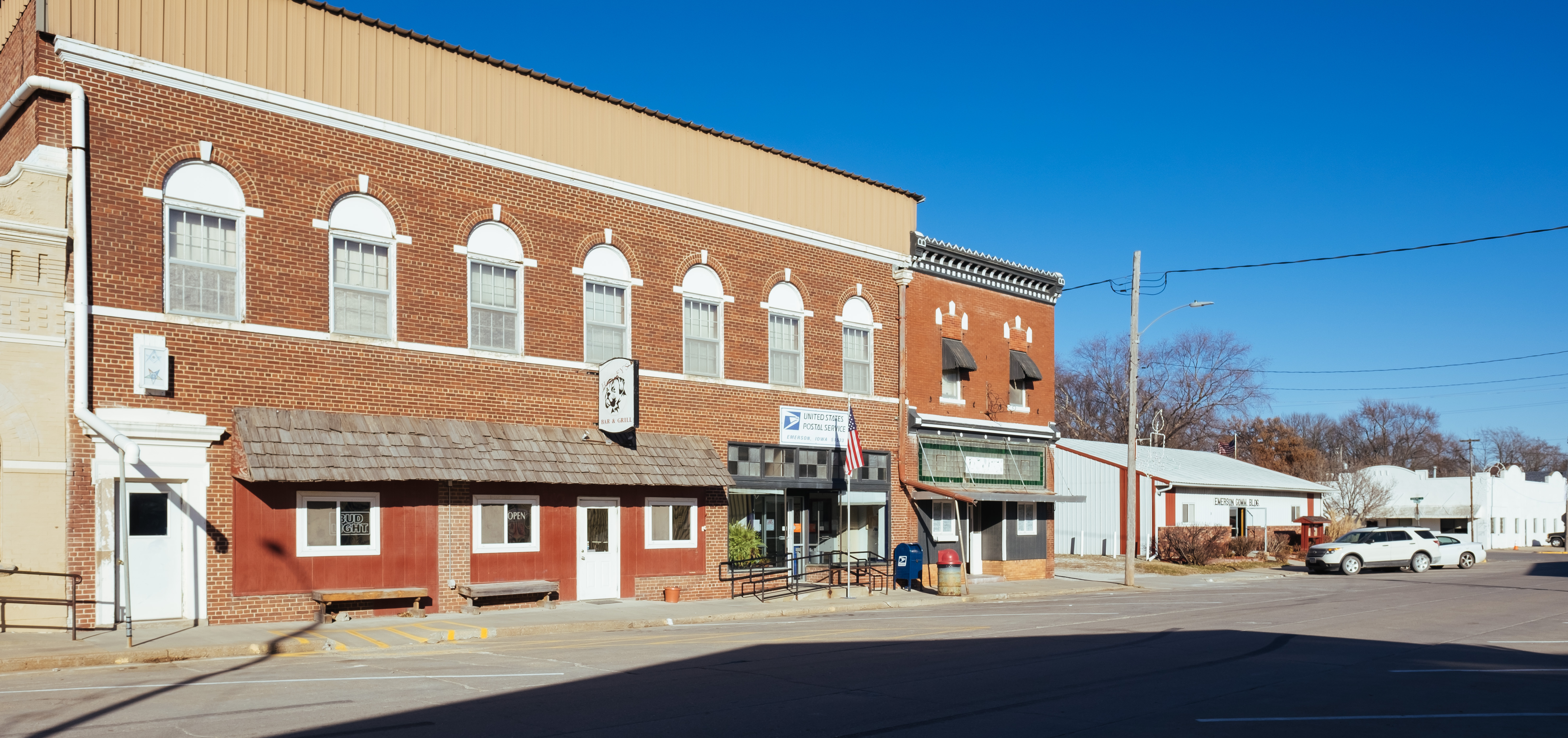
- Morton Avenue in Emerson

- Location of Emerson, Iowa
- Coordinates: 41°01′05″N 95°24′10″W
- Country: USA
- State: Iowa
- County: Mills

Area
  - Total: 0.25 sq mi (0.66 km^{2})
  - Land: 0.25 sq mi (0.66 km^{2})
  - Water: 0 sq mi (0.00 km^{2})
- Elevation: 1,066 ft (325 m)

Population (2020)
  - Total: 403
  - Density: 1,581.6/sq mi (610.65/km^{2})
- Time zone: UTC-6 (Central (CST))
  - Summer (DST): UTC-5 (CDT)
- ZIP code: 51533
- Area code: 712
- FIPS code: 19-25500
- GNIS feature ID: 2394685
- Website: emersonia.org

Emerson is a city in Mills County, Iowa, United States. The population was 403 at the time of the 2020 census.

== History ==
Emerson was a shipping point on the Chicago, Burlington and Quincy Railroad.

== Geography ==
According to the United States Census Bureau, the city has a total area of 0.26 square miles (0.67 km^{2}), all land.

== Demographics ==
Historical populations
Year	Pop.	±%
1880	456	—
1890	404	−11.4%
1900	502	+24.3%
1910	478	−4.8%
1920	475	−0.6%
1930	512	+7.8%
1940	498	−2.7%
1950	556	+11.6%
1960	521	−6.3%
1970	484	−7.1%
1980	502	+3.7%
1990	476	−5.2%
2000	480	+0.8%
2010	438	−8.8%
2020	403	−8.0%
Source:"U.S. Census website". United States Census Bureau. and Iowa Data Center; Source: U.S. Decennial Census

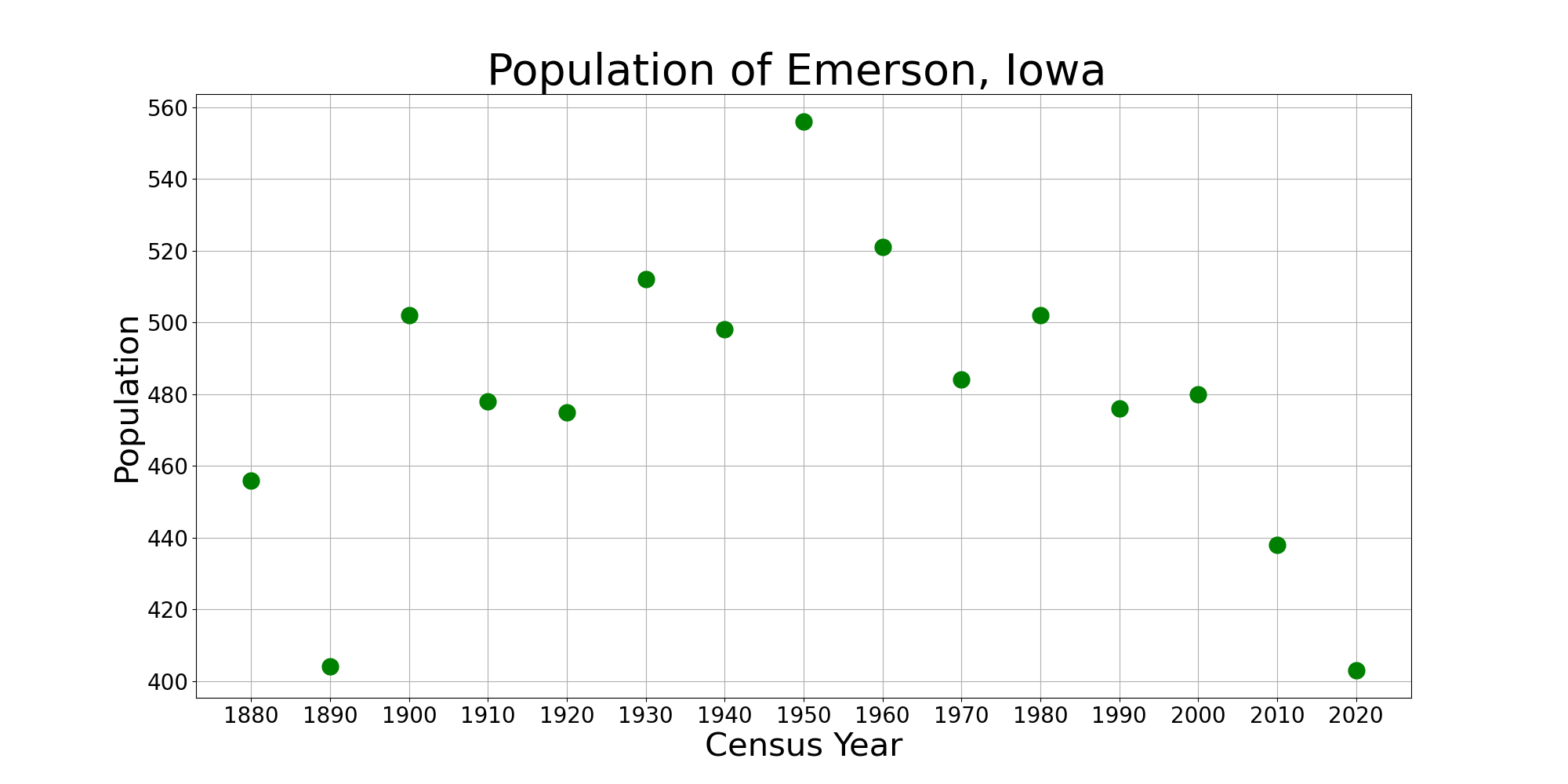
The population of Emerson, Iowa from US census data

=== 2020 census ===
As of the census of 2020, there were 403 people, 166 households, and 115 families residing in the city. The population density was 1,581.6 inhabitants per square mile (610.6/km^{2}). There were 204 housing units at an average density of 800.6 per square mile (309.1/km^{2}). The racial makeup of the city was 95.0% White, 0.5% Black or African American, 0.0% Native American, 0.0% Asian, 0.2% Pacific Islander, 0.2% from other races and 4.0% from two or more races. Hispanic or Latino persons of any race comprised 1.5% of the population.

Of the 166 households, 29.5% of which had children under the age of 18 living with them, 52.4% were married couples living together, 5.4% were cohabitating couples, 27.1% had a female householder with no spouse or partner present and 15.1% had a male householder with no spouse or partner present. 30.7% of all households were non-families. 26.5% of all households were made up of individuals, 12.7% had someone living alone who was 65 years old or older.

The median age in the city was 43.9 years. 24.3% of the residents were under the age of 20; 4.5% were between the ages of 20 and 24; 22.6% were from 25 and 44; 26.3% were from 45 and 64; and 22.3% were 65 years of age or older. The gender makeup of the city was 51.9% male and 48.1% female.

=== 2010 census ===
As of the census of 2010, there were 438 people, 186 households, and 123 families living in the city. The population density was 1,684.6 inhabitants per square mile (650.4/km^{2}). There were 203 housing units at an average density of 780.8 per square mile (301.5/km^{2}). There were 186 households, of which 26.9% had children under the age of 18 living with them, 55.4% were married couples living together, 8.1% had a female householder with no husband present, 2.7% had a male householder with no wife present, and 33.9% were non-families. 30.1% of all households were made up of individuals, and 18.8% had someone living alone who was 65 years of age or older. The average household size was 2.35 and the average family size was 2.87.

The median age in the city was 45.8 years. 21.9% of residents were under the age of 18; 5.6% were between the ages of 18 and 24; 21.8% were from 25 to 44; 31.5% were from 45 to 64; and 19.2% were 65 years of age or older. The gender makeup of the city was 48.6% male and 51.4% female.

=== 2000 census ===
As of the census of 2000, there were 480 people, 195 households, and 133 families living in the city. The population density was 1,914.2 inhabitants per square mile (739.1/km^{2}). There were 208 housing units at an average density of 829.5 per square mile (320.3/km^{2}). The racial makeup of the city was 98.96% White, 0.21% African American, 0.21% from other races, and 0.62% from two or more races. Hispanic or Latino of any race were 0.62% of the population.

There were 195 households, out of which 31.3% had children under the age of 18 living with them, 59.5% were married couples living together, 7.7% had a female householder with no husband present, and 31.3% were non-families. 29.2% of all households were made up of individuals, and 16.9% had someone living alone who was 65 years of age or older. The average household size was 2.46 and the average family size was 3.03.

In the city, the population was spread out, with 26.0% under the age of 18, 4.6% from 18 to 24, 27.7% from 25 to 44, 25.8% from 45 to 64, and 15.8% who were 65 years of age or older. The median age was 38 years. For every 100 females, there were 88.2 males. For every 100 females age 18 and over, there were 86.8 males.

The median income for a household in the city was $31,583, and the median income for a family was $36,406. Males had a median income of $29,167 versus $21,250 for females. The per capita income for the city was $15,807. About 7.3% of families and 11.2% of the population were below the poverty line, including 21.2% of those under age 18 and none of those age 65 or over.

== Education ==
The community is within the East Mills Community School District.
