= Tippecanoe Township, Henry County, Iowa =

Township in Henry County, Iowa, U.S.

Coordinates: 40°57′N 91°39′W

Tippecanoe Township is a township in Henry County, Iowa, USA.
