= Westwood, Iowa =

- City
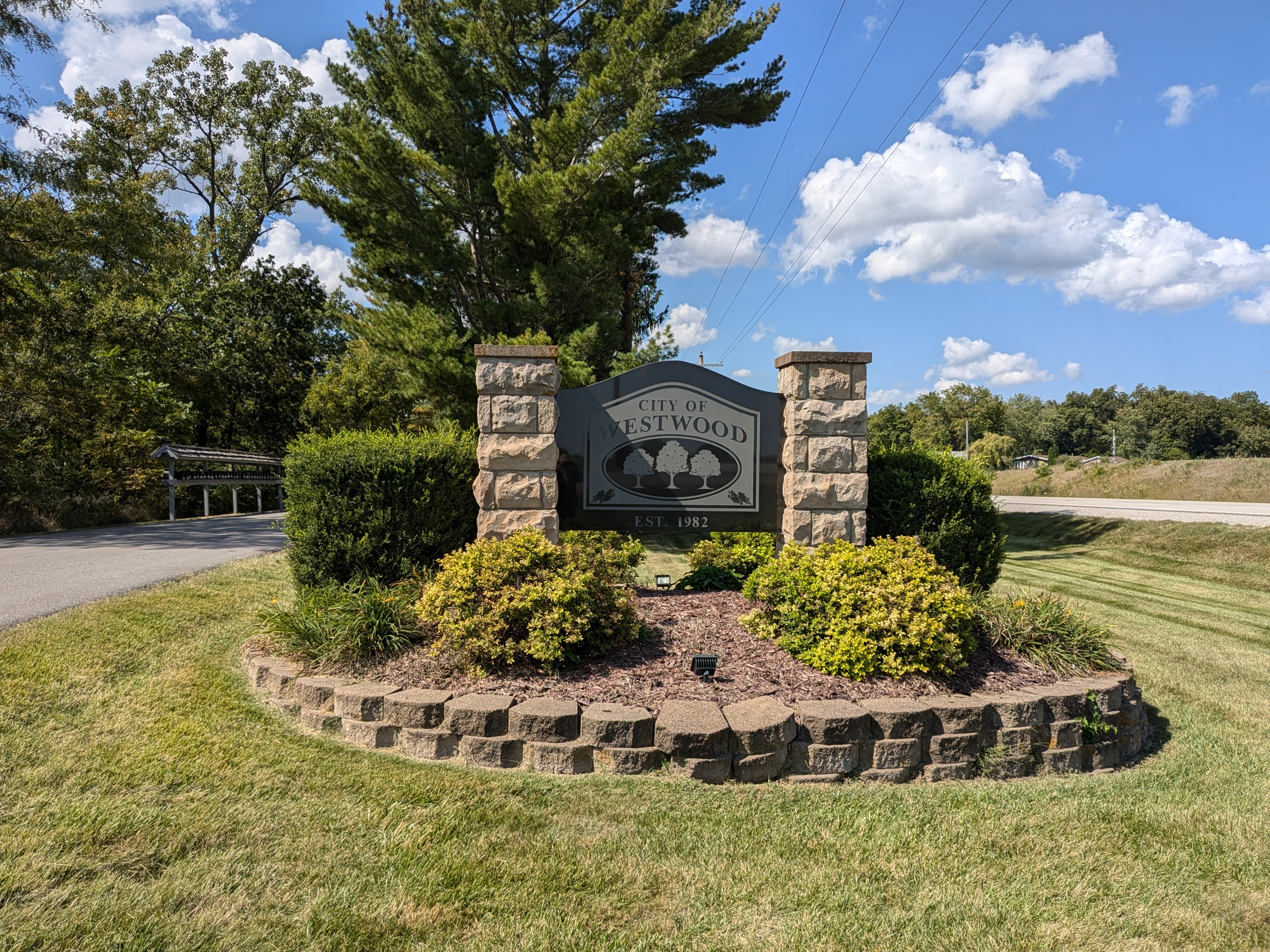
- Welcome Sign in Westwood

- Location of Westwood, Iowa
- Coordinates: 40°57′54″N 91°37′35″W
- Country: United States
- State: Iowa
- County: Henry

Area
  - Total: 0.11 sq mi (0.29 km^{2})
  - Land: 0.11 sq mi (0.28 km^{2})
  - Water: 0.0039 sq mi (0.01 km^{2})
- Elevation: 689 ft (210 m)

Population (2020)
  - Total: 101
  - Density: 930.6/sq mi (359.29/km^{2})
- Time zone: UTC-6 (Central (CST))
  - Summer (DST): UTC-5 (CDT)
- ZIP code: 52641
- Area code: 319
- FIPS code: 19-84835
- GNIS feature ID: 2397288
- Website: www.westwoodia.com

Westwood is a city in Henry County, Iowa, United States. The population was 101 at the time of the 2020 census.

== Geography ==
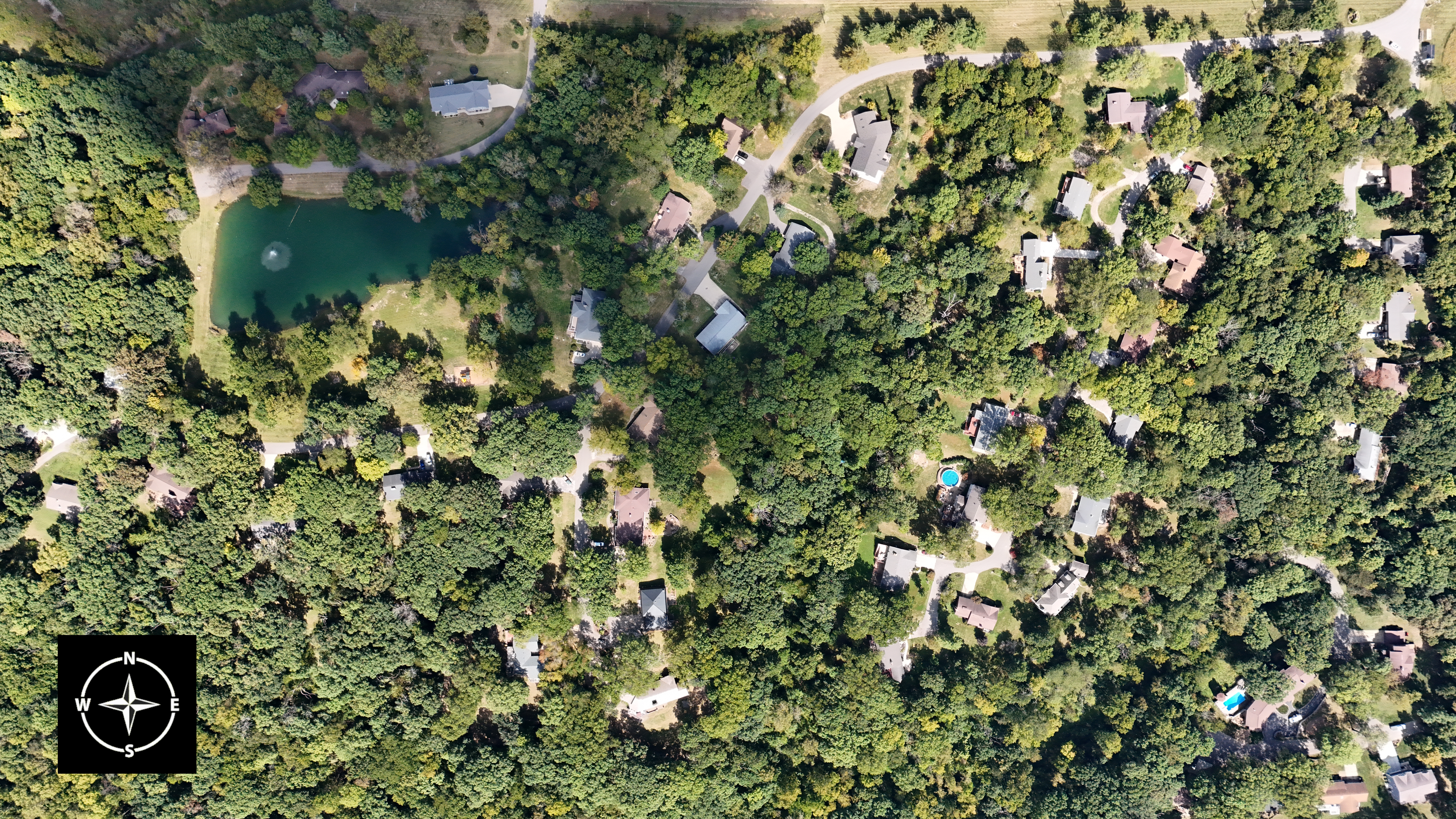
An aerial photo of Westwood, taken on September 17, 2024

According to the United States Census Bureau, the city has a total area of 0.15 square miles (0.39 km^{2}), all land.

== Demographics ==
Historical populations
Year	Pop.	±%
1990	104	—
2000	127	+22.1%
2010	112	−11.8%
2020	101	−9.8%
Source:"U.S. Census website". United States Census Bureau. and Iowa Data Center; Source: U.S. Decennial Census

=== 2020 census ===
As of the census of 2020, there were 101 people, 44 households, and 34 families residing in the city. The population density was 930.5 inhabitants per square mile (359.3/km^{2}). There were 48 housing units at an average density of 442.2 per square mile (170.7/km^{2}). The racial makeup of the city was 100.0% White, 0.0% Black or African American, 0.0% Native American, 0.0% Asian, 0.0% Pacific Islander, 0.0% from other races and 0.0% from two or more races. Hispanic or Latino persons of any race comprised 0.0% of the population.

Of the 44 households, 18.2% of which had children under the age of 18 living with them, 72.7% were married couples living together, 4.5% were cohabitating couples, 13.6% had a female householder with no spouse or partner present and 9.1% had a male householder with no spouse or partner present. 22.7% of all households were non-families. 18.2% of all households were made up of individuals, 9.1% had someone living alone who was 65 years old or older.

The median age in the city was 60.2 years. 11.9% of the residents were under the age of 20; 2.0% were between the ages of 20 and 24; 15.8% were from 25 and 44; 34.7% were from 45 and 64; and 35.6% were 65 years of age or older. The gender makeup of the city was 48.5% male and 51.5% female.

=== 2010 census ===
As of the census of 2010, there were 112 people, 47 households, and 38 families living in the city. The population density was 746.7 inhabitants per square mile (288.3/km^{2}). There were 47 housing units at an average density of 313.3 per square mile (121.0/km^{2}). The racial makeup of the city was 100.0% White.

There were 47 households, of which 23.4% had children under the age of 18 living with them, 78.7% were married couples living together, 2.1% had a female householder with no husband present, and 19.1% were non-families. 14.9% of all households were made up of individuals, and 12.8% had someone living alone who was 65 years of age or older. The average household size was 2.38 and the average family size was 2.66.

The median age in the city was 56 years. 19.6% of residents were under the age of 18; 1.8% were between the ages of 18 and 24; 11.7% were from 25 to 44; 41.9% were from 45 to 64; and 25% were 65 years of age or older. The gender makeup of the city was 47.3% male and 52.7% female.

=== 2000 census ===
As of the census of 2000, there were 127 people, 46 households, and 43 families living in the city. The population density was 835.1 inhabitants per square mile (322.4/km^{2}). There were 47 housing units at an average density of 309.1 per square mile (119.3/km^{2}). The racial makeup of the city was 96.06% White, 0.79% African American, and 3.15% from two or more races.

There were 46 households, out of which 34.8% had children under the age of 18 living with them, 93.5% were married couples living together, and 6.5% were non-families. 6.5% of all households were made up of individuals, and 4.3% had someone living alone who was 65 years of age or older. The average household size was 2.76 and the average family size was 2.86.

In the city, the population was spread out, with 23.6% under the age of 18, 3.9% from 18 to 24, 13.4% from 25 to 44, 46.5% from 45 to 64, and 12.6% who were 65 years of age or older. The median age was 49 years. For every 100 females, there were 104.8 males. For every 100 females age 18 and over, there were 98.0 males.

The median income for a household in the city was $89,522, and the median income for a family was $90,571. Males had a median income of $63,438 versus $28,750 for females. The per capita income for the city was $33,677. None of the population and none of the families were below the poverty line.

== Education ==
The Mount Pleasant Community School District operates local area public schools. Mount Pleasant Community High School is the designated comprehensive high school.
