= Burlington micropolitan area, Iowa =

Coordinates: 40°49′N 91°07′W

Burlington Micropolitan Area
- Micropolitan Statistical Area
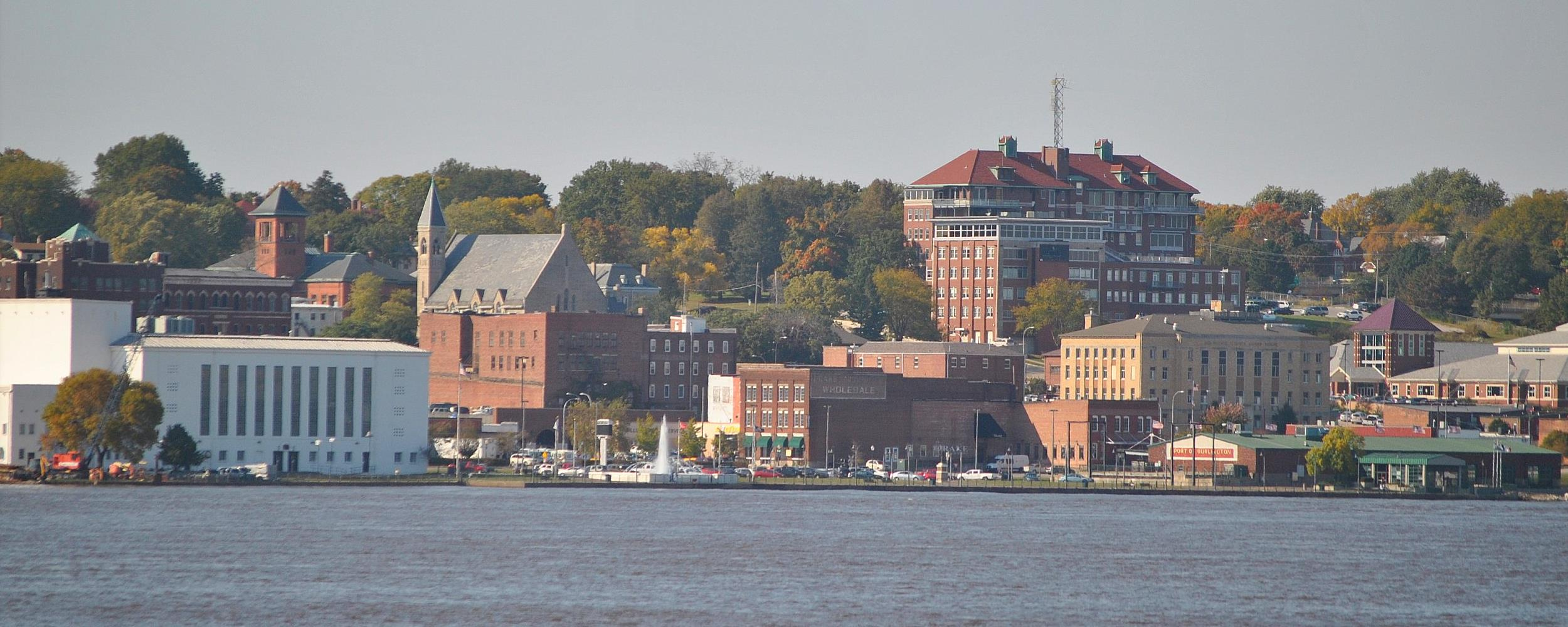
- Downtown Burlington from Mississippi River
Map of Burlington–Fort Madison, IA–IL CSA
Burlington, IA–IL MSA
Fort Madison, IA-IL-MO µSA
City of Burlington
City of Fort Madison
City of Keokuk
- Country: United States
- State: Iowa; Illinois
- Principal cities: Burlington; West Burlington; Fort Madison; Keokuk
- Time zone: UTC−6 (CST)
  - Summer (DST): UTC−5 (CDT)

The Burlington, IA−IL Micropolitan Statistical Area, as defined by the United States Census Bureau, is an area consisting of two counties−one in southeast Iowa and the other in West Central Illinois, anchored by the city of Burlington, Iowa.

As of the 2000 census, the μSA had a population of 50,564 (though a July 1, 2009 estimate placed the population at 48,412).

== Counties ==
- Clark County, Missouri
- Des Moines County, Iowa
- Hancock County, Illinois
- Henderson County, Illinois
- Lee County, Iowa

== Communities ==
- Places with more than 20,000 inhabitants
  - Burlington, Iowa (Principal city)
- Places with 1,000 to 10,000 inhabitants
  - Dallas City, Illinois (partial)
  - Mediapolis, Iowa
  - Oquawka, Illinois
  - West Burlington, Iowa
- Places with 500 to 1,000 inhabitants
  - Danville, Iowa
  - Middletown, Iowa
  - Stronghurst, Illinois
- Places with less than 500 inhabitants
  - Biggsville, Illinois
  - Gladstone, Illinois
  - Gulf Port, Illinois
  - Lomax, Illinois
  - Media, Illinois
  - Raritan, Illinois
- Unincorporated places
  - Augusta, Iowa
  - Carman, Illinois
  - Carthage Lake, Illinois
  - Decorra, Illinois
  - Hopper, Illinois
  - Olena, Illinois
  - Shokonon, Illinois
  - Sperry, Iowa

== Townships ==
=== Des Moines County ===
- Benton Township
- Burlington Township
- Concordia Township
- Danville Township
- Flint River Township
- Franklin Township
- Huron Township
- Jackson Township
- Pleasant Grove Township
- Tama Township
- Union Township
- Washington Township
- Yellow Springs Township

=== Henderson County ===
- Bald Bluff Township
- Biggsville Township
- Carman Township
- Gladstone Township
- Lomax Township
- Media Township
- Oquawka Township
- Raritan Township
- Rozetta Township
- Stronghurst Township
- Terre Haute Township

== Demographics ==
As of the census of 2000, there were 50,564 people, 20,635 households, and 13,911 families residing within the μSA. The racial makeup of the μSA was 94.47% White, 3.03% African American, 0.22% Native American, 0.51% Asian, 0.04% Pacific Islander, 0.60% from other races, and 1.12% from two or more races. Hispanic or Latino of any race were 1.61% of the population.

The median income for a household in the μSA was $36,598, and the median income for a family was $43,745. Males had a median income of $33,060 versus $21,815 for females. The per capita income for the μSA was $18,579.

== See also ==
- Iowa statistical areas
- Illinois statistical areas
