= Beaverdale, Des Moines County, Iowa =

Beaverdale, Iowa
- Census-designated place
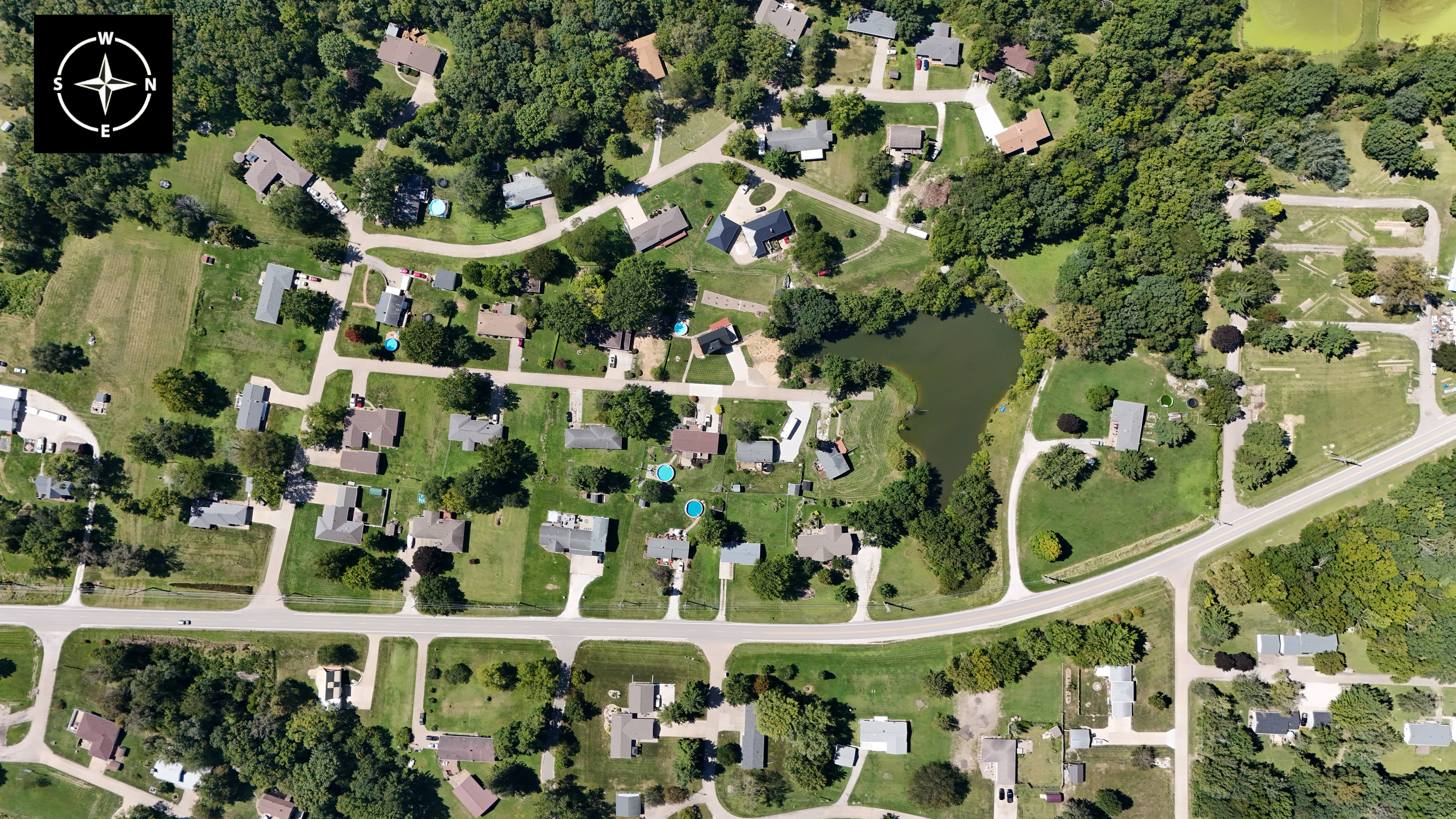
- An aerial photograph of Beaverdale, taken on September 4, 2024

- Location within the state of Iowa
- Coordinates: 40°51′14″N 91°12′26″W
- Country: USA
- State: Iowa
- County: Des Moines
- Township: Flint River

Area
  - Total: 3.19 sq mi (8.26 km^{2})
  - Land: 3.15 sq mi (8.17 km^{2})
  - Water: 0.031 sq mi (0.08 km^{2})
- Elevation: 679 ft (207 m)

Population (2020)
  - Total: 880
  - Density: 278.9/sq mi (107.67/km^{2})
- Time zone: UTC-6 (CST)
  - Summer (DST): UTC-5 (CDT)
- Area code: 319
- FIPS code: 19-05200
- GNIS feature ID: 2629958

Beaverdale is an unincorporated community and census-designated place (CDP) in Flint River Township, Des Moines County, Iowa, United States. As of the 2020 census it had a population of 880. It is part of the Burlington, Iowa micropolitan area.

== Geography ==
Beaverdale is located in south-central Des Moines County in southeastern Iowa, directly north of the city of West Burlington and 7 miles (11 km) northwest of the city of Burlington.

According to the United States Census Bureau, the Beaverdale CDP has a total area of 2.46 square miles (6.36 km^{2}), of which 2.44 square miles (6.31 km^{2}) is land and 0.02 square miles (0.05 km^{2}), or 0.75%, is water. The CDP extends north to the valley of Flint Creek, which flows east to the Mississippi River just north of Burlington.

== Demographics ==
Historical population
Census	Pop.	Note	%±
2010	952		—
2020	880		−7.6%
U.S. Decennial Census

=== 2020 census ===
As of the census of 2020, there were 880 people, 365 households, and 252 families residing in the community. The population density was 278.9 inhabitants per square mile (107.7/km^{2}). There were 410 housing units at an average density of 129.9 per square mile (50.2/km^{2}). The racial makeup of the community was 92.2% White, 0.5% Black or African American, 0.5% Native American, 0.2% Asian, 0.7% Pacific Islander, 0.7% from other races and 5.3% from two or more races. Hispanic or Latino persons of any race comprised 2.5% of the population.

Of the 365 households, 24.1% of which had children under the age of 18 living with them, 57.3% were married couples living together, 5.8% were cohabitating couples, 21.1% had a female householder with no spouse or partner present and 15.9% had a male householder with no spouse or partner present. 31.0% of all households were non-families. 26.3% of all households were made up of individuals, 18.1% had someone living alone who was 65 years old or older.

The median age in the community was 50.4 years. 21.4% of the residents were under the age of 20; 3.5% were between the ages of 20 and 24; 19.4% were from 25 and 44; 27.6% were from 45 and 64; and 28.1% were 65 years of age or older. The gender makeup of the community was 52.3% male and 47.7% female.

=== 2010 census ===
As of the census of 2010, there were 952 people, 385 households, and 294 families residing in the town. The population density was 390.8 inhabitants per square mile (150.9/km^{2}). There were 447 housing units at an average density of 183.5 per square mile (70.8/km^{2}). The racial makeup of the town was 95.6% White, 1.5% African American, 0.3% Native American, 0.2% Asian, 0.1% from other races, and 2.3% from two or more races. Hispanic or Latino of any race were 1.8% of the population.

There were 385 households, out of which 25.5% had children under the age of 18 living with them, 61.6% were married couples living together, 10.1% had a female householder with no husband present, 4.7% had a male householder with no wife present, and 23.6% were non-families. 18.7% of all households were made up of individuals, and 6.8% had someone living alone who was 65 years of age or older. The average household size was 2.47 and the average family size was 2.77.

In the city the population was spread out, with 23.5% under the age of 18, 5.9% from 18 to 24, 22.5% from 25 to 44, 31.5% from 45 to 64, and 16.5% who were 65 years of age or older. The median age was 43.3 years. The gender makeup of the city was 49.2% male and 50.8% female.
