= Oak Hills, Iowa =

- Census-designated place
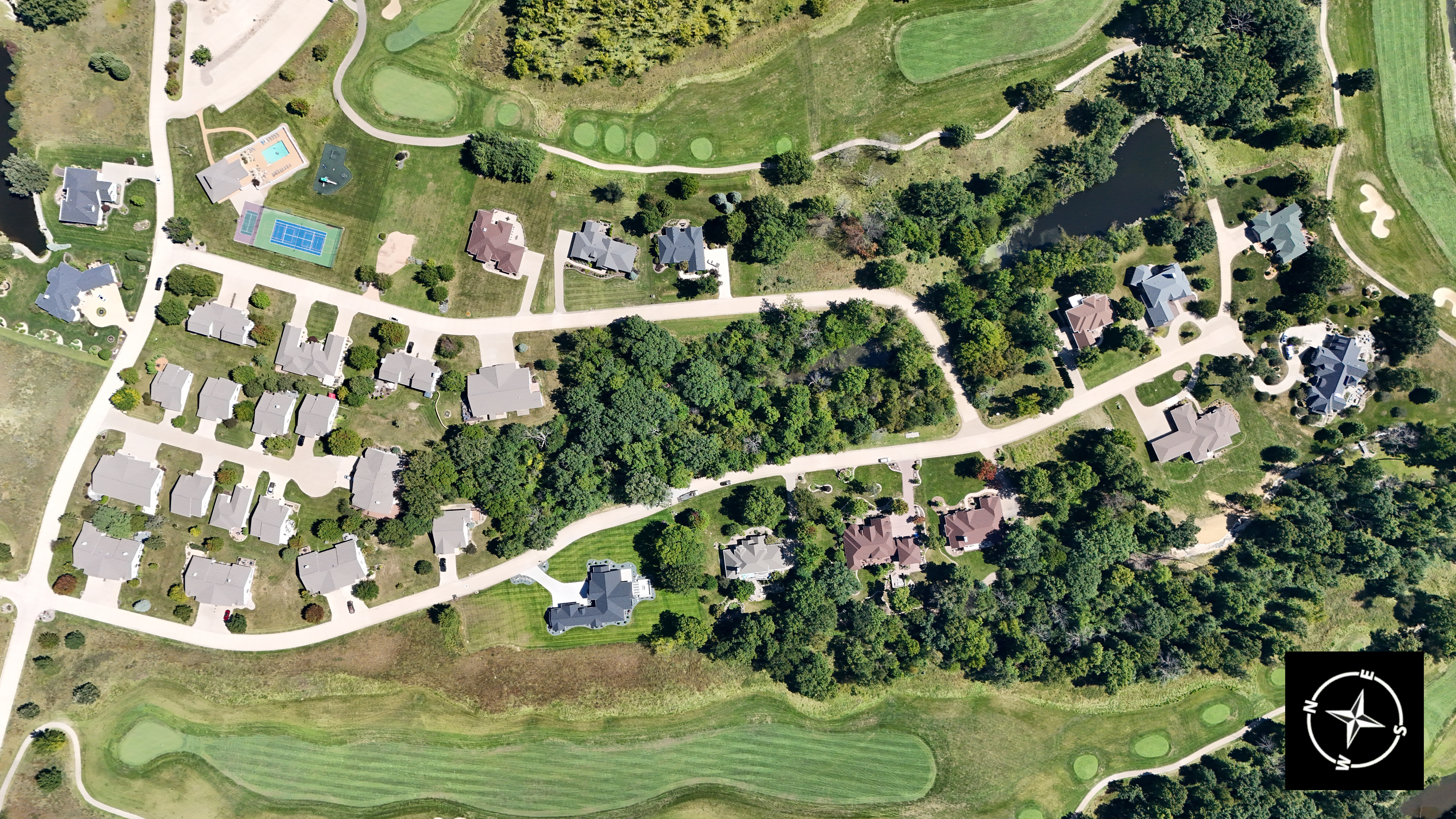
- An aerial photograph of Oak Hills, taken on September 4, 2024

- Location within Iowa Location within the United States
- Coordinates: 40°45′15″N 91°08′57″W
- Country: USA
- State: Iowa
- County: Des Moines
- Townships: Union; Concordia

Area
  - Total: 1.14 sq mi (2.95 km^{2})
  - Land: 1.13 sq mi (2.93 km^{2})
  - Water: 0.0077 sq mi (0.02 km^{2})
- Elevation: 646 ft (197 m)

Population (2020)
  - Total: 186
  - Density: 164.5/sq mi (63.53/km^{2})
- Time zone: UTC-6 (Central (CST))
  - Summer (DST): UTC-5 (CDT)
- ZIP Code: 52601 (Burlington)
- Area code: 319
- FIPS code: 19-58048
- GNIS feature ID: 2804123

Oak Hills is a census-designated place (CDP) in Des Moines County, Iowa, United States. It is in the southeast part of the county, 4 miles (6 km) southwest of Burlington. U.S. Route 61 forms the western edge of the community. It consists of residences surrounding Spirit Hollow Golf Course. As of the 2020 census, Oak Hills had a population of 186.

Oak Hills was first listed as a CDP prior to the 2020 census.

== Demographics ==
Historical population
Census	Pop.	Note	%±
2020	186		—
U.S. Decennial Census

=== 2020 census ===
As of the census of 2020, there were 186 people, 77 households, and 66 families residing in the community. The population density was 164.5 inhabitants per square mile (63.5/km^{2}). There were 89 housing units at an average density of 78.7 per square mile (30.4/km^{2}). The racial makeup of the community was 95.2% White, 0.0% Black or African American, 0.0% Native American, 1.1% Asian, 0.0% Pacific Islander, 0.0% from other races and 3.8% from two or more races. Hispanic or Latino persons of any race comprised 2.2% of the population.

Of the 77 households, 7.8% of which had children under the age of 18 living with them, 84.4% were married couples living together, 3.9% were cohabitating couples, 10.4% had a female householder with no spouse or partner present and 1.3% had a male householder with no spouse or partner present. 14.3% of all households were non-families. 10.4% of all households were made up of individuals, 9.1% had someone living alone who was 65 years old or older.

The median age in the community was 61.6 years. 17.7% of the residents were under the age of 20; 1.6% were between the ages of 20 and 24; 12.4% were from 25 and 44; 27.4% were from 45 and 64; and 40.9% were 65 years of age or older. The gender makeup of the community was 46.2% male and 53.8% female.
