= Danville Township =

Danville Township may refer to the following townships in the United States:

- Danville Township, Vermilion County, Illinois
- Danville Township, Des Moines County, Iowa
- Danville Township, Worth County, Iowa
- Danville Township, Blue Earth County, Minnesota
