= Yellow Springs Township, Des Moines County, Iowa =

Coordinates: 41.03°N 91.18°W

Yellow Springs Township
- Township
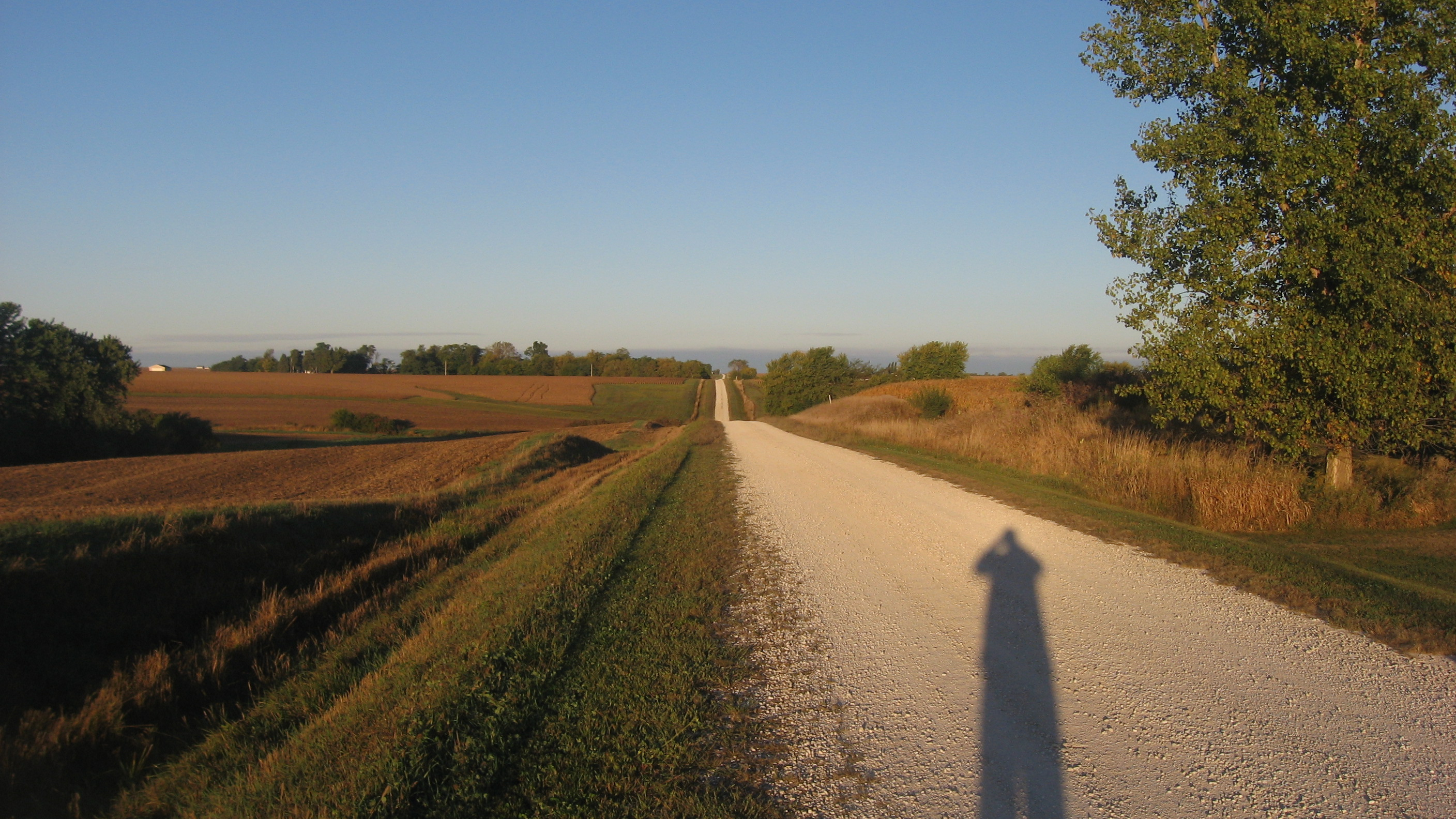
- Countryside north of Mediapolis
- Interactive map of Yellow Springs Township
- Country: United States
- State: Iowa
- County: Des Moines County
- Established: 1838

Area
  - Total: 46.8 sq mi (121 km^{2})
  - Land: 46.8 sq mi (121 km^{2})
  - Water: 0.0 sq mi (0 km^{2})

Population
  - Total: 557
- Time zone: UTC-6 (CST)
  - Summer (DST): UTC-5 (CDT)

Yellow Springs is a township in Des Moines County, Iowa, United States. The township includes the territory of a former incarnation of Huron Township. When the township was first settled, there were Indians living on the land, and they were moved to an Indian reservation that included part of the township. The early 20th century author Augustine M. Antrobus described most of the settlers as "men of character, men who left their impress on the times in which they lived, so much so, that this township can boast, that no other is its superior in all these things which exalt a people".
