= Yarmouth, Iowa =

- Census-designated place
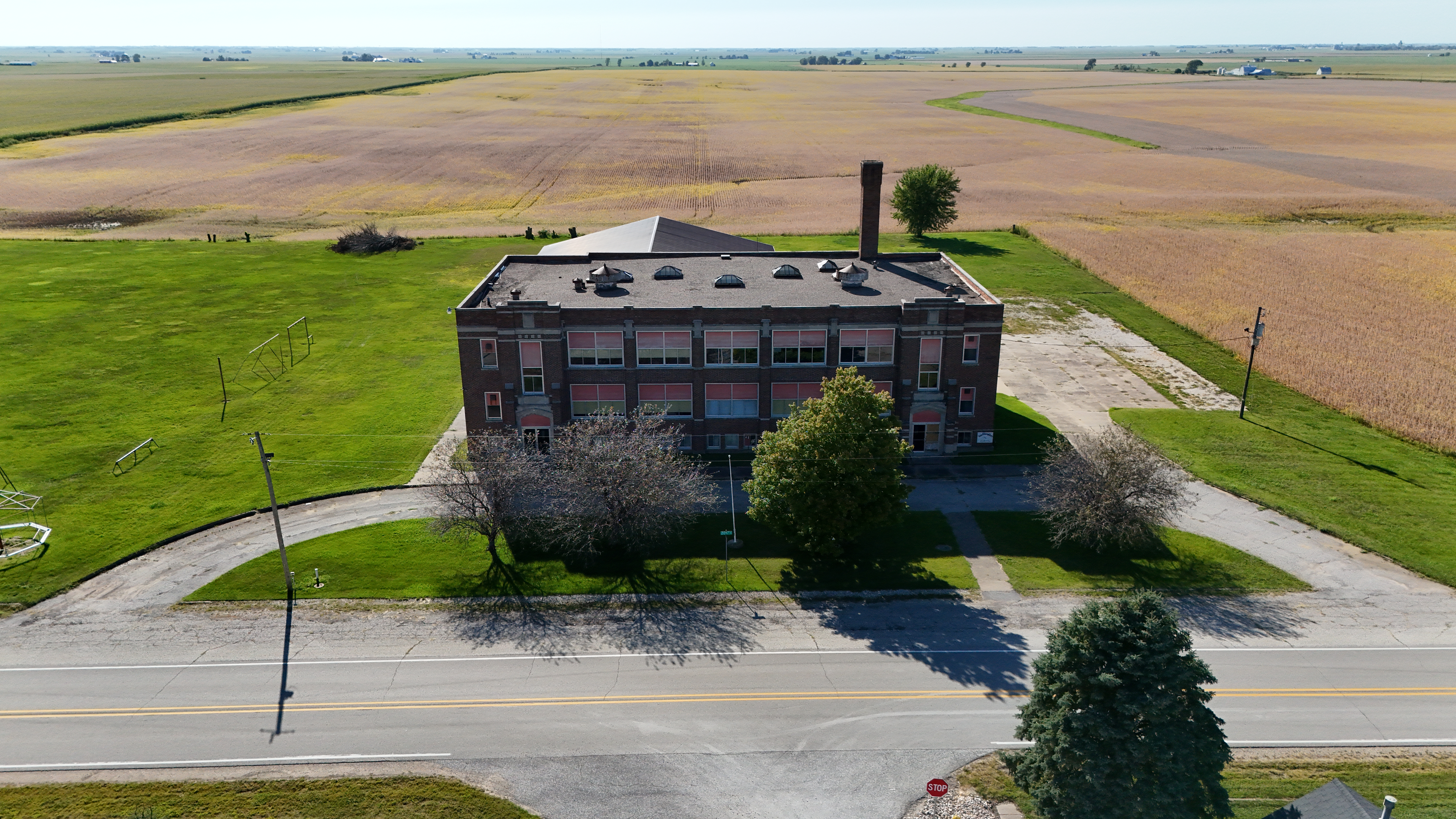
- A school building in Yarmouth

- Location within the state of Iowa Yarmouth (the United States)
- Coordinates: 41°01′28″N 91°19′19″W
- Country: United States
- State: Iowa
- County: Des Moines

Area
  - Total: 1.71 sq mi (4.43 km^{2})
  - Land: 1.71 sq mi (4.43 km^{2})
  - Water: 0 sq mi (0.00 km^{2})
- Elevation: 810 ft (250 m)

Population (2020)
  - Total: 61
  - Density: 35.6/sq mi (13.76/km^{2})
- Time zone: UTC-6 (Central (CST))
  - Summer (DST): UTC-5 (CDT)
- ZIP code: 52660
- Area code: 319
- FIPS code: 19-87330
- GNIS feature ID: 2804130

Yarmouth is an unincorporated community and census-designated place (CDP) in northwestern Des Moines County, Iowa, United States. As of the 2020 census its population was 61.

== History ==
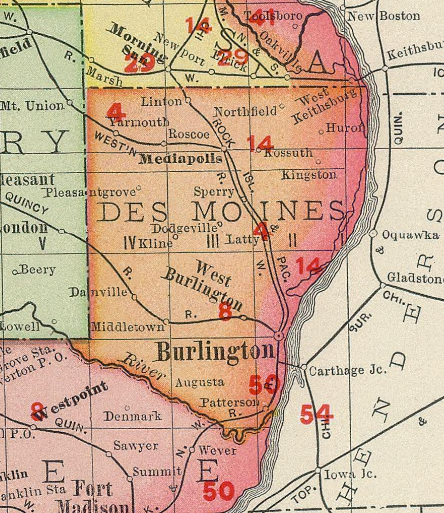
Yarmouth in Des Moines County, Iowa, in 1903

The village was laid out by Andrew C Kline after arriving here in 1876 and opening a general store. Around the same time, a blacksmith set up shop here.

In 1881, around the time the Burlington and Northwestern Railway arrived, the La Vega post office, originally about a mile to the east, was moved here and renamed Yarmouth. By 1885, the village had close to 100 residents, and included 3 general stores, a drug store, blacksmith shop, billiard hall, and two churches.

In 1897, Yarmouth had a stock yard across the tracks from the depot, two grain elevators, and the Starker Brother's Lumber Yard and Corn Cribs. The post office was across the street from a bank, and there was a Baptist and a Methodist Episcopal church, along with perhaps 20 houses. Many of the vacant lots were owned by the Narrow Gauge Land Company.

In 1902, Yarmouth's population was 55. By 1905, There was a Masonic lodge, Federal Lodge No, 445, and the Mutual Telephone Company of Yarmouth was in business. The population was 177 in 1940.

== Geography ==
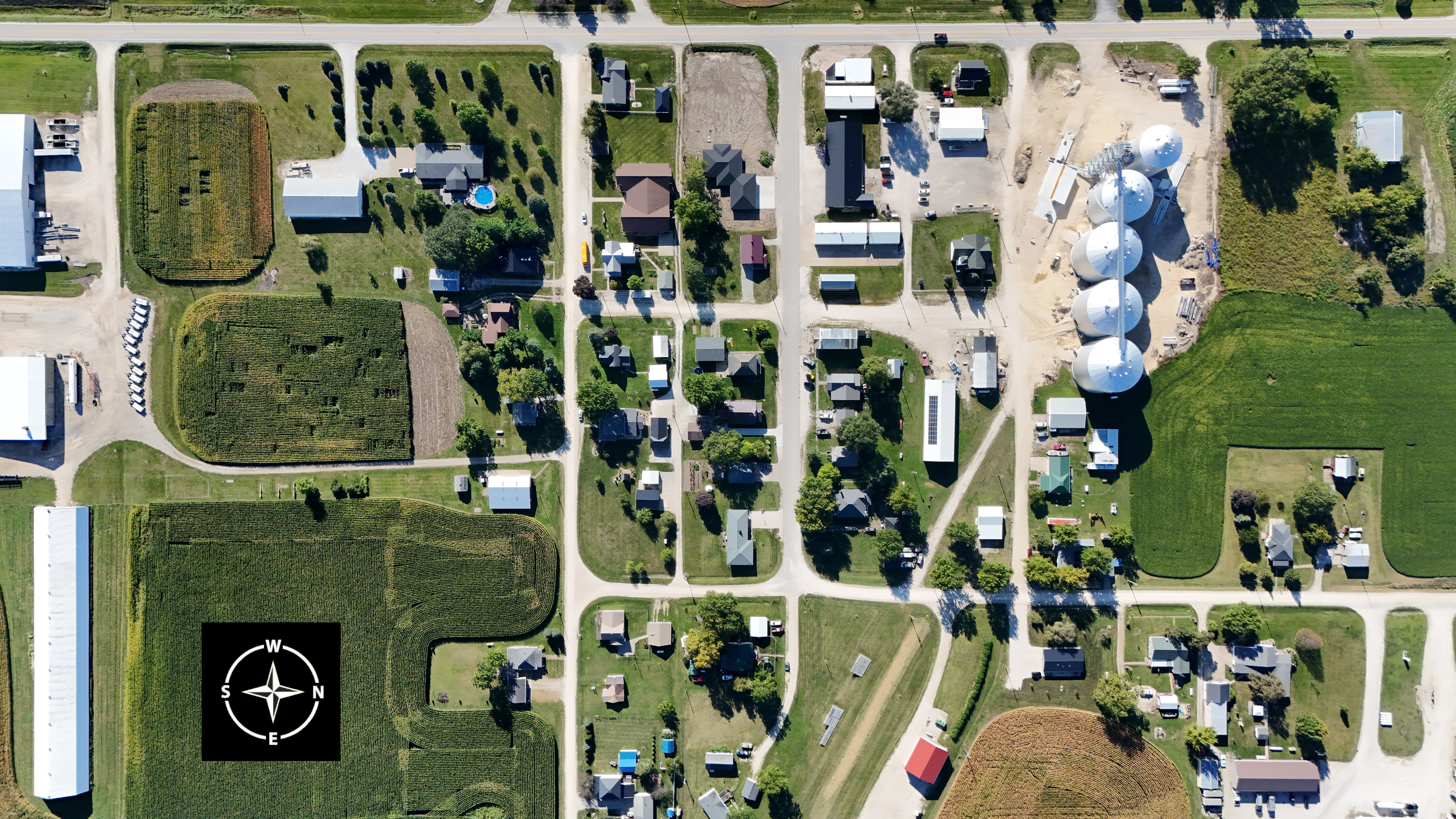
An aerial photograph of Yarmouth, taken on September 4, 2024

Yarmouth is located on a broad low ridge that has been identified as a terminal moraine of the Illinoian glaciation. The land to the west is pre-illinoian, while the land to the east of this ridge is Illinoian glacial till. Geological investigation of wells drilled in Yarmouth led to the discovery of a paleosol on top of the pre-illinoian surface and buried under the terminal moraine. This has been named the Yarmouth paleosol, and the interglacial era during which this soil layer was built was formerly called the Yarmouth interglacial.

205th Avenue passes north–south through Yarmouth at an elevation of 810 feet above sea level; this forms part of Des Moines County Highway X31.

== Demographics ==
Historical population
Census	Pop.	Note	%±
2020	61		—
U.S. Decennial Census

=== 2020 census ===
As of the census of 2020, there were 61 people, 29 households, and 14 families residing in the community. The population density was 35.6 inhabitants per square mile (13.8/km^{2}). There were 36 housing units at an average density of 21.0 per square mile (8.1/km^{2}). The racial makeup of the community was 96.7% White, 0.0% Black or African American, 0.0% Native American, 0.0% Asian, 0.0% Pacific Islander, 0.0% from other races and 3.3% from two or more races. Hispanic or Latino persons of any race comprised 1.6% of the population.

Of the 29 households, 13.8% of which had children under the age of 18 living with them, 34.5% were married couples living together, 3.4% were cohabitating couples, 44.8% had a female householder with no spouse or partner present and 17.2% had a male householder with no spouse or partner present. 51.7% of all households were non-families. 44.8% of all households were made up of individuals, 34.5% had someone living alone who was 65 years old or older.

The median age in the community was 33.8 years. 18.0% of the residents were under the age of 20; 0.0% were between the ages of 20 and 24; 44.3% were from 25 and 44; 26.2% were from 45 and 64; and 11.5% were 65 years of age or older. The gender makeup of the community was 55.7% male and 44.3% female.
