= Burlington Township, Des Moines County, Iowa =

Township in Des Moines County, Iowa, U.S.

Coordinates: 40.8070°N 91.1168°W

Burlington Township is a township in Des Moines County, Iowa, United States.

== History ==
Burlington Township was organized in 1841.
