= Jackson Township, Des Moines County, Iowa =

Township in Des Moines County, Iowa, U.S.

Coordinates: 40.94785°N 90.9936905°W

Jackson Township is a township in Des Moines County, Iowa, United States.

== History ==
Jackson Township was formerly a part of Benton Township until April 8, 1850.
