= 1948 United States presidential election in Iowa =

- November 2, 1948

All 10 Iowa votes to the Electoral College

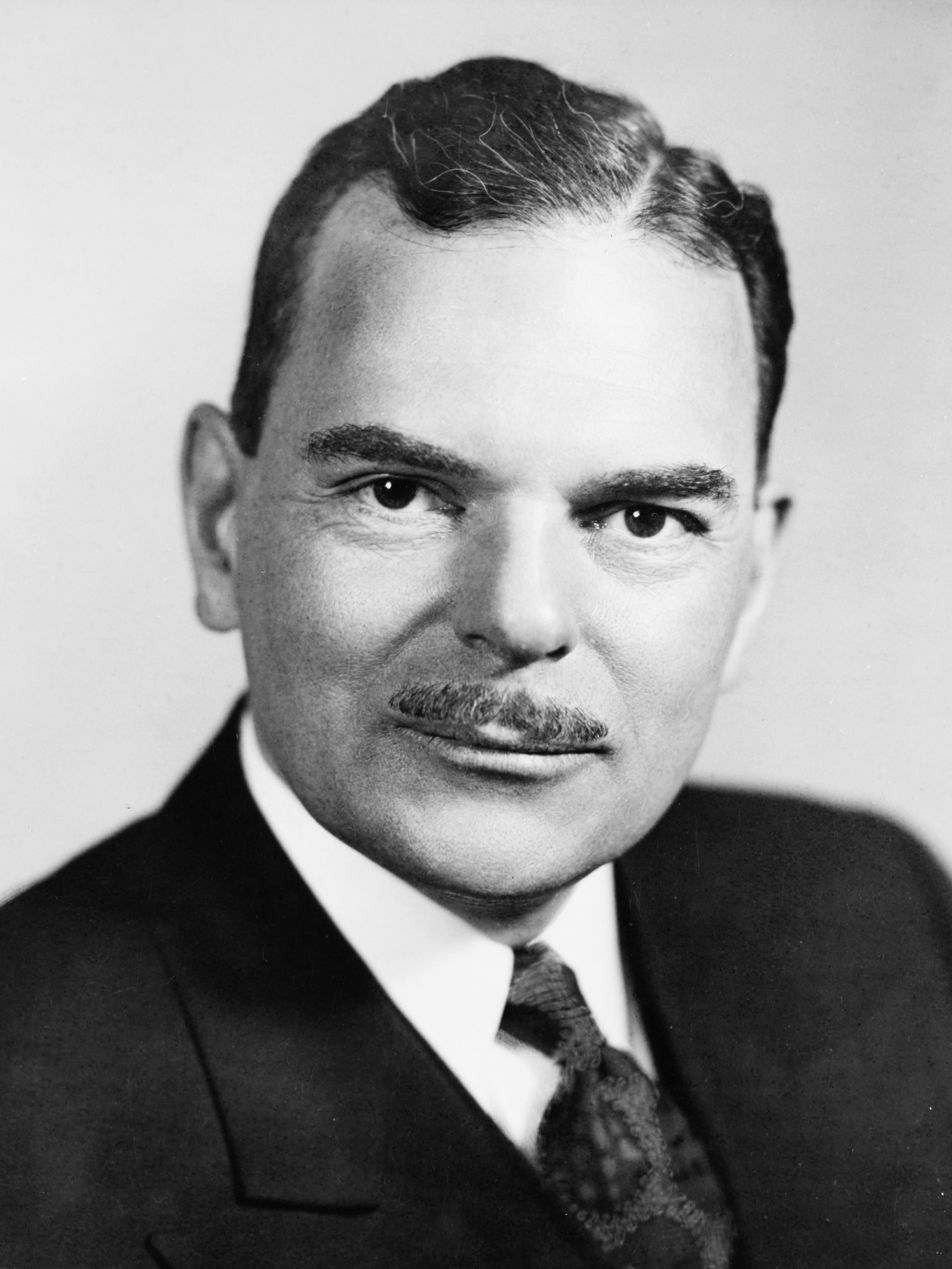
Nominee	Harry S. Truman	Thomas E. Dewey
Party	Democratic	Republican
Home state	Missouri	New York
Running mate	Alben W. Barkley	Earl Warren
Electoral vote	10	0
Popular vote	522,380	494,018
Percentage	50.31%	47.58%
County results
Truman
40–50%
50–60%
Dewey
40–50%
50–60%
60–70%
President before election
Harry S. Truman
Democratic
Elected President
Harry S. Truman
Democratic

The 1948 United States presidential election in Iowa took place on November 2, 1948, as part of the 1948 United States presidential election. Iowa voters chose ten representatives, or electors, to the Electoral College, who voted for president and vice president.

Iowa was won by incumbent Democratic President Harry S. Truman of neighbouring Missouri, running with Senator Alben W. Barkley, with 50.31% of the popular vote, against Governor Thomas E. Dewey (R–New York), running with Governor Earl Warren, with 47.58% of the popular vote.

Defying the expectations of a Dewey sweep in a state he won four years earlier, in an unexpected twist, Truman would manage to flip the state from Republican to Democratic, a swing of roughly 6%.

== Results ==
1948 United States presidential election in Iowa
Party	Candidate	Votes	%
Democratic	Harry S. Truman (inc.)	522,380	50.31%
Republican	Thomas E. Dewey	494,018	47.58%
Progressive	Henry A. Wallace	12,125	1.17%
Socialist Labor	Edward A. Teichert	4,274	0.41%
Prohibition	Claude A. Watson	3,382	0.33%
Write-in		2,093	0.20%
Total votes		1,038,272	100%

=== Results by county ===
County	Harry S. Truman Democratic		Thomas E. Dewey Republican		Henry A. Wallace Progressive		Edward A. Teichert Socialist Labor		Claude A. Watson Prohibition		Various candidates Other parties		Margin		Total votes cast
County	#	%	#	%	#	%	#	%	#	%	#	%	#	%	Total votes cast
Adair	2,567	46.48%	2,879	52.13%	58	1.05%	2	0.04%	16	0.29%	1	0.02%	-312	-5.65%	5,523
Adams	1,817	45.29%	2,142	53.39%	23	0.57%	4	0.10%	25	0.62%	1	0.02%	-325	-8.10%	4,012
Allamakee	3,172	41.06%	4,474	57.91%	58	0.75%	10	0.13%	5	0.06%	7	0.09%	-1,302	-16.85%	7,726
Appanoose	4,998	53.77%	4,078	43.87%	111	1.19%	17	0.18%	81	0.87%	11	0.12%	920	9.90%	9,296
Audubon	2,840	55.11%	2,177	42.25%	114	2.21%	6	0.12%	10	0.19%	6	0.12%	663	12.86%	5,153
Benton	4,209	50.30%	3,770	45.06%	116	1.39%	233	2.78%	21	0.25%	18	0.22%	439	5.24%	8,367
Black Hawk	19,603	54.11%	16,041	44.28%	282	0.78%	123	0.34%	91	0.25%	90	0.25%	3,562	9.83%	36,230
Boone	5,541	54.21%	4,183	40.92%	242	2.37%	168	1.64%	71	0.69%	17	0.17%	1,358	13.29%	10,222
Bremer	3,502	47.11%	3,837	51.62%	50	0.67%	12	0.16%	13	0.17%	19	0.26%	-335	-4.51%	7,433
Buchanan	4,127	48.42%	4,310	50.57%	59	0.69%	10	0.12%	11	0.13%	6	0.07%	-183	-2.15%	8,523
Buena Vista	4,340	51.10%	3,959	46.61%	161	1.90%	20	0.24%	13	0.15%	0	0.00%	381	4.49%	8,493
Butler	3,008	46.18%	3,380	51.90%	101	1.55%	4	0.06%	9	0.14%	11	0.17%	-372	-5.72%	6,513
Calhoun	3,164	49.45%	3,083	48.19%	114	1.78%	6	0.09%	19	0.30%	12	0.19%	81	1.26%	6,398
Carroll	5,711	58.36%	3,974	40.61%	78	0.80%	4	0.04%	13	0.13%	6	0.06%	1,737	17.75%	9,786
Cass	3,372	39.40%	5,106	59.66%	60	0.70%	7	0.08%	9	0.11%	5	0.06%	-1,734	-20.26%	8,559
Cedar	2,958	42.16%	3,957	56.40%	73	1.04%	3	0.04%	14	0.20%	11	0.16%	-999	-14.24%	7,016
Cerro Gordo	9,544	53.98%	7,840	44.34%	202	1.14%	4	0.02%	67	0.38%	25	0.14%	1,704	9.64%	17,682
Cherokee	3,739	52.34%	3,318	46.44%	61	0.85%	1	0.01%	20	0.28%	5	0.07%	421	5.90%	7,144
Chickasaw	4,071	53.64%	3,449	45.45%	57	0.75%	6	0.08%	2	0.03%	4	0.05%	622	8.19%	7,589
Clarke	2,101	47.98%	2,195	50.13%	48	1.10%	9	0.21%	18	0.41%	8	0.18%	-94	-2.15%	4,379
Clay	3,649	52.42%	3,036	43.61%	150	2.15%	89	1.28%	22	0.32%	15	0.22%	613	8.81%	6,961
Clayton	4,857	48.04%	5,151	50.94%	79	0.78%	9	0.09%	10	0.10%	5	0.05%	-294	-2.90%	10,111
Clinton	8,534	45.72%	9,859	52.82%	169	0.91%	38	0.20%	33	0.18%	32	0.17%	-1,325	-7.10%	18,665
Crawford	3,983	53.21%	3,267	43.65%	137	1.83%	74	0.99%	15	0.20%	9	0.12%	716	9.56%	7,485
Dallas	5,661	52.32%	4,810	44.46%	173	1.60%	85	0.79%	76	0.70%	14	0.13%	851	7.86%	10,819
Davis	2,982	56.21%	2,276	42.90%	20	0.38%	9	0.17%	15	0.28%	3	0.06%	706	13.31%	5,305
Decatur	3,172	54.66%	2,547	43.89%	62	1.07%	4	0.07%	18	0.31%	0	0.00%	625	10.77%	5,803
Delaware	2,876	38.36%	4,555	60.75%	53	0.71%	3	0.04%	7	0.09%	4	0.05%	-1,679	-22.39%	7,498
Des Moines	8,792	52.56%	7,621	45.56%	191	1.14%	9	0.05%	52	0.31%	64	0.38%	1,171	7.00%	16,729
Dickinson	2,324	48.76%	2,304	48.34%	43	0.90%	67	1.41%	14	0.29%	14	0.29%	20	0.42%	4,766
Dubuque	15,521	59.90%	10,111	39.02%	190	0.73%	13	0.05%	4	0.02%	74	0.29%	5,410	20.88%	25,913
Emmet	2,752	51.80%	2,464	46.38%	49	0.92%	8	0.15%	35	0.66%	5	0.09%	288	5.42%	5,313
Fayette	5,303	45.09%	6,296	53.54%	113	0.96%	3	0.03%	30	0.26%	15	0.13%	-993	-8.45%	11,760
Floyd	3,688	43.40%	4,644	54.65%	125	1.47%	2	0.02%	28	0.33%	10	0.12%	-956	-11.25%	8,497
Franklin	2,871	47.68%	2,716	45.11%	169	2.81%	216	3.59%	29	0.48%	20	0.33%	155	2.57%	6,021
Fremont	2,637	49.03%	2,698	50.17%	15	0.28%	2	0.04%	19	0.35%	7	0.13%	-61	-1.14%	5,378
Greene	2,946	46.84%	3,059	48.63%	100	1.59%	138	2.19%	31	0.49%	16	0.25%	-113	-1.79%	6,290
Grundy	2,344	41.51%	3,154	55.85%	106	1.88%	4	0.07%	33	0.58%	6	0.11%	-810	-14.34%	5,647
Guthrie	3,392	49.22%	3,389	49.18%	76	1.10%	4	0.06%	28	0.41%	2	0.03%	3	0.04%	6,891
Hamilton	3,613	49.19%	3,535	48.13%	153	2.08%	13	0.18%	16	0.22%	15	0.20%	78	1.06%	7,345
Hancock	3,096	51.17%	2,802	46.31%	126	2.08%	7	0.12%	17	0.28%	3	0.05%	294	4.86%	6,051
Hardin	4,023	45.44%	4,553	51.42%	219	2.47%	9	0.10%	22	0.25%	28	0.32%	-530	-5.98%	8,854
Harrison	4,608	51.11%	4,341	48.15%	44	0.49%	12	0.13%	8	0.09%	3	0.03%	267	2.96%	9,016
Henry	3,042	38.98%	4,620	59.19%	61	0.78%	3	0.04%	64	0.82%	15	0.19%	-1,578	-20.21%	7,805
Howard	3,378	55.47%	2,630	43.19%	51	0.84%	2	0.03%	22	0.36%	7	0.11%	748	12.28%	6,090
Humboldt	2,855	52.56%	2,498	45.99%	66	1.22%	3	0.06%	7	0.13%	3	0.06%	357	6.57%	5,432
Ida	2,365	50.34%	2,257	48.04%	44	0.94%	1	0.02%	26	0.55%	5	0.11%	108	2.30%	4,698
Iowa	3,030	43.42%	3,659	52.44%	126	1.81%	135	1.93%	16	0.23%	12	0.17%	-629	-9.02%	6,978
Jackson	3,263	46.58%	3,597	51.35%	79	1.13%	49	0.70%	7	0.10%	10	0.14%	-334	-4.77%	7,005
Jasper	6,684	52.28%	5,710	44.66%	132	1.03%	160	1.25%	70	0.55%	30	0.23%	974	7.62%	12,786
Jefferson	3,033	42.79%	3,906	55.11%	29	0.41%	2	0.03%	112	1.58%	6	0.08%	-873	-12.32%	7,088
Johnson	8,611	52.82%	7,139	43.79%	359	2.20%	36	0.22%	33	0.20%	125	0.77%	1,472	9.03%	16,303
Jones	3,915	47.04%	4,290	51.55%	99	1.19%	10	0.12%	5	0.06%	3	0.04%	-375	-4.51%	8,322
Keokuk	4,118	48.59%	4,201	49.57%	89	1.05%	9	0.11%	51	0.60%	7	0.08%	-83	-0.98%	8,475
Kossuth	6,039	58.33%	4,186	40.43%	112	1.08%	4	0.04%	7	0.07%	5	0.05%	1,853	17.90%	10,353
Lee	9,201	53.46%	7,801	45.32%	103	0.60%	28	0.16%	61	0.35%	18	0.10%	1,400	8.14%	17,212
Linn	20,995	48.71%	20,881	48.45%	668	1.55%	226	0.52%	196	0.45%	132	0.31%	114	0.26%	43,098
Louisa	1,945	43.92%	2,420	54.64%	25	0.56%	5	0.11%	29	0.65%	5	0.11%	-475	-10.72%	4,429
Lucas	2,697	49.26%	2,656	48.51%	57	1.04%	2	0.04%	53	0.97%	10	0.18%	41	0.75%	5,475
Lyon	2,174	45.86%	2,500	52.74%	55	1.16%	4	0.08%	3	0.06%	4	0.08%	-326	-6.88%	4,740
Madison	2,827	46.17%	3,207	52.38%	56	0.91%	1	0.02%	29	0.47%	3	0.05%	-380	-6.21%	6,123
Mahaska	4,327	47.92%	4,238	46.93%	30	0.33%	142	1.57%	147	1.63%	146	1.62%	89	0.99%	9,030
Marion	6,300	57.96%	4,312	39.67%	111	1.02%	40	0.37%	87	0.80%	20	0.18%	1,988	18.29%	10,870
Marshall	5,602	43.65%	6,698	52.19%	134	1.04%	265	2.06%	100	0.78%	34	0.26%	-1,096	-8.54%	12,833
Mills	2,155	42.20%	2,921	57.20%	13	0.25%	16	0.31%	2	0.04%	0	0.00%	-766	-15.00%	5,107
Mitchell	2,873	46.95%	3,021	49.37%	169	2.76%	7	0.11%	44	0.72%	5	0.08%	-148	-2.42%	6,119
Monona	4,098	55.79%	3,179	43.28%	52	0.71%	6	0.08%	5	0.07%	6	0.08%	919	12.51%	7,346
Monroe	3,445	58.13%	2,371	40.01%	69	1.16%	8	0.13%	18	0.30%	15	0.25%	1,074	18.12%	5,926
Montgomery	2,751	39.81%	4,084	59.10%	44	0.64%	23	0.33%	5	0.07%	3	0.04%	-1,333	-19.29%	6,910
Muscatine	5,466	47.06%	6,003	51.68%	105	0.90%	3	0.03%	17	0.15%	21	0.18%	-537	-4.62%	11,615
O'Brien	3,421	46.70%	3,697	50.46%	177	2.42%	4	0.05%	11	0.15%	16	0.22%	-276	-3.76%	7,326
Osceola	2,123	53.90%	1,772	44.99%	36	0.91%	3	0.08%	1	0.03%	4	0.10%	351	8.91%	3,939
Page	3,567	36.61%	5,638	57.87%	419	4.30%	110	1.13%	5	0.05%	4	0.04%	-2,071	-21.26%	9,743
Palo Alto	3,858	58.45%	2,594	39.30%	120	1.82%	11	0.17%	11	0.17%	7	0.11%	1,264	19.15%	6,601
Plymouth	4,339	46.08%	5,002	53.12%	43	0.46%	4	0.04%	25	0.27%	3	0.03%	-663	-7.04%	9,416
Pocahontas	3,500	57.84%	2,397	39.61%	134	2.21%	3	0.05%	11	0.18%	6	0.10%	1,103	18.23%	6,051
Polk	45,289	55.65%	33,742	41.46%	1,189	1.46%	659	0.81%	212	0.26%	288	0.35%	11,547	14.19%	81,379
Pottawattamie	11,430	47.44%	12,384	51.40%	145	0.60%	66	0.27%	30	0.12%	40	0.17%	-954	-3.96%	24,095
Poweshiek	4,324	51.57%	3,888	46.37%	68	0.81%	17	0.20%	35	0.42%	53	0.63%	436	5.20%	8,385
Ringgold	1,922	43.10%	2,487	55.77%	28	0.63%	22	0.49%		0.00%	0	0.00%	-565	-12.67%	4,459
Sac	3,699	50.24%	3,505	47.60%	94	1.28%	10	0.14%	47	0.64%	8	0.11%	194	2.64%	7,363
Scott	16,661	48.89%	16,842	49.42%	411	1.21%	29	0.09%	37	0.11%	101	0.30%	-181	-0.53%	34,081
Shelby	3,499	50.45%	3,301	47.60%	76	1.10%	47	0.68%	7	0.10%	5	0.07%	198	2.85%	6,935
Sioux	4,042	41.24%	5,597	57.11%	127	1.30%	15	0.15%	10	0.10%	10	0.10%	-1,555	-15.87%	9,801
Story	6,152	40.34%	8,307	54.47%	283	1.86%	364	2.39%	75	0.49%	70	0.46%	-2,155	-14.13%	15,251
Tama	5,115	51.01%	4,763	47.50%	123	1.23%	11	0.11%	8	0.08%	8	0.08%	352	3.51%	10,028
Taylor	2,402	42.16%	3,244	56.93%	27	0.47%	5	0.09%	19	0.33%	1	0.02%	-842	-14.77%	5,698
Union	3,218	43.40%	4,138	55.81%	33	0.45%	6	0.08%	14	0.19%	5	0.07%	-920	-12.41%	7,414
Van Buren	1,917	40.89%	2,702	57.64%	38	0.81%	1	0.02%	29	0.62%	1	0.02%	-785	-16.75%	4,688
Wapello	10,841	57.13%	7,875	41.50%	127	0.67%	72	0.38%	45	0.24%	16	0.08%	2,966	15.63%	18,976
Warren	3,481	45.77%	3,876	50.97%	109	1.43%	73	0.96%	56	0.74%	10	0.13%	-395	-5.20%	7,605
Washington	3,485	42.27%	4,680	56.76%	47	0.57%	2	0.02%	26	0.32%	5	0.06%	-1,195	-14.49%	8,245
Wayne	3,314	54.12%	2,738	44.72%	31	0.51%	4	0.07%	33	0.54%	3	0.05%	576	9.40%	6,123
Webster	9,508	55.71%	6,951	40.73%	359	2.10%	168	0.98%	34	0.20%	46	0.27%	2,557	14.98%	17,066
Winnebago	2,626	48.17%	2,636	48.36%	136	2.49%	18	0.33%	27	0.50%	8	0.15%	-10	-0.19%	5,451
Winneshiek	4,905	50.76%	4,594	47.54%	139	1.44%	8	0.08%	10	0.10%	7	0.07%	311	3.22%	9,663
Woodbury	22,056	56.43%	16,655	42.61%	230	0.59%	18	0.05%	71	0.18%	54	0.14%	5,401	13.82%	39,084
Worth	2,623	56.57%	1,878	40.50%	108	2.33%	6	0.13%	18	0.39%	4	0.09%	745	16.07%	4,637
Wright	3,866	49.56%	3,810	48.85%	78	1.00%	20	0.26%	21	0.27%	5	0.06%	56	0.71%	7,800
Total	522,380	50.31%	494,018	47.58%	12,125	1.17%	4,274	0.41%	3,382	0.33%	2,093	0.20%	28,362	2.73%	1,038,272

==== Counties that flipped from Democratic to Republican ====
- Scott

==== Counties that flipped from Republican to Democratic ====
- Carroll
- Cherokee
- Chickasaw
- Crawford
- Dallas
- Des Moines
- Emmet
- Franklin
- Guthrie
- Hancock
- Harrison
- Ida
- Lee
- Linn
- Lucas
- Mahaska
- Osceola
- Sac
- Shelby
- Wayne
- Winneshiek

== See also ==
- United States presidential elections in Iowa
