= Iowa Highway 99 =

Former state highway in Iowa, United States

Iowa Highway 99
- Iowa 99 highlighted in red

Route information
- Length: 33.232 mi (53.482 km)
- Existed: 1931–2003
- Tourist routes: Great River Road

Major junctions
- South end: US 34 in Burlington
- North end: US 61 in Wapello

Location
- Country: United States
- State: Iowa
- Counties: Des Moines; Louisa

Highway system
- Iowa Primary Highway System; Interstate; US; State; Secondary; Scenic
← Iowa 98	→ Iowa 100

Iowa Highway 99 (Iowa 99) was a state highway in southeastern Iowa. It began in downtown Burlington and generally followed the course of the Mississippi River north to Wapello. Most of the route was a part of the Great River Road. The highway was designated in 1931 and its course remained unchanged until it was removed from the primary highway system in 2003. It was replaced by County Road X99, though around Burlington, it is sometimes referred to as County Road 99.

== Route description ==
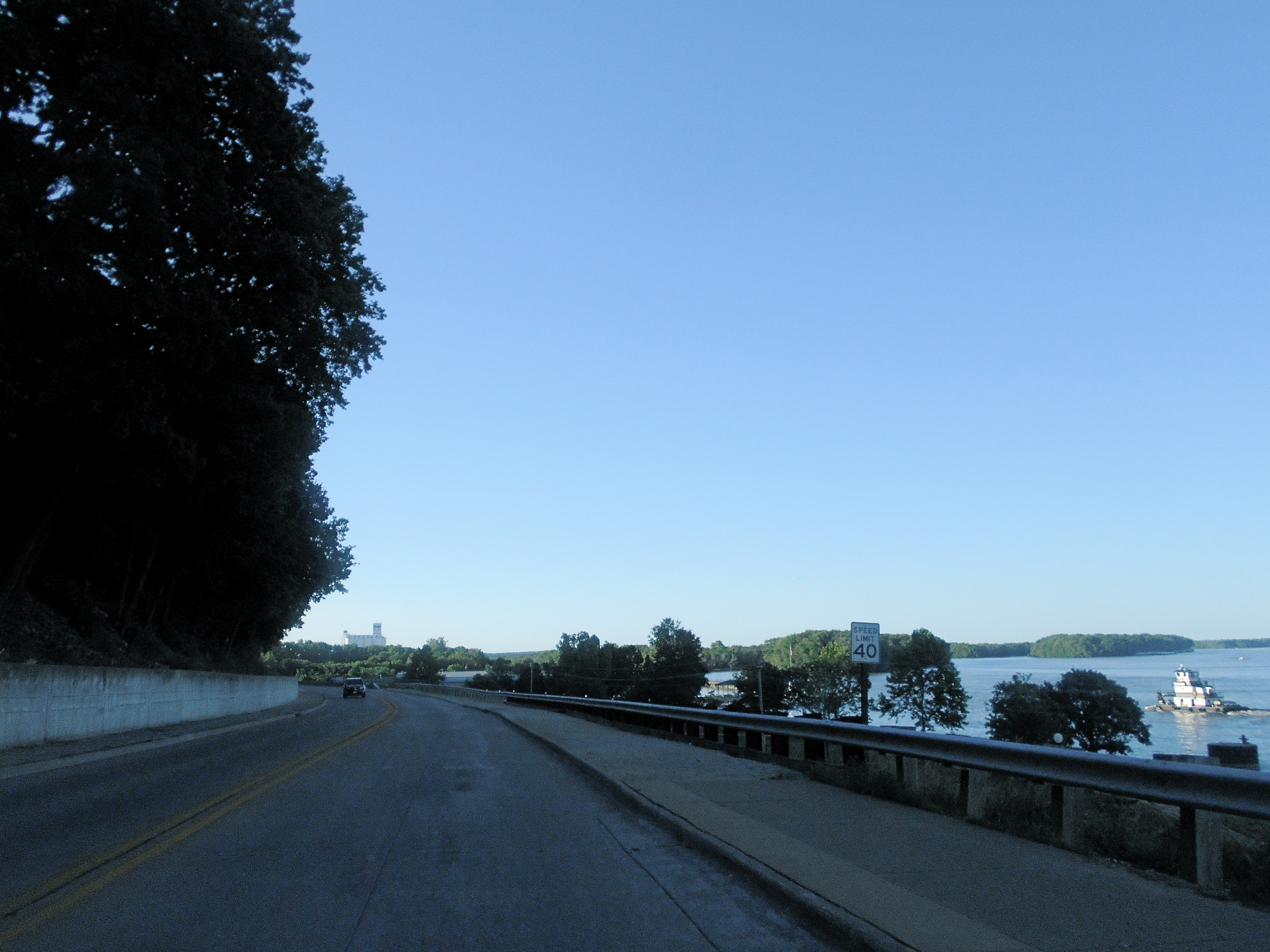
Iowa 99 ran along the Mississippi River on the north side of Burlington

Iowa 99 began at an interchange with US 34 in downtown Burlington, at the foot of the. US 34 is an elevated highway that connects to the Great River Bridge and Iowa 99 passed beneath along Bluff Road. Iowa 99 is joined by the Great River Road as well. To the east of the highway lies a park and municipal marina, both of which abut the Mississippi River. To the west, a bluff rises above the roadway. North of Burlington, the highway followed the base of the tree-lined bluffs to the west; it served as a divider to the farm fields occupying the river bottoms to the east. The road passed through the unincorporated community of Kingston.

Near the Des Moines–Louisa county line, the bluffs recede to the west as the highway approached Oakville. In Oakville, Iowa 99 turned to the west and crossed the Iowa River as the river bends to the north. The road followed the western banks for a short way as the river approached its mouth at the Mississippi. At Toolesboro, it turned to the northwest and passed the Toolesboro Mound Group, a group of Hopewellian burial mounds which date back approximately 2,000 years. Shortly after Toolesboro, at County Road X61 (CR X61), the Great River Road turned away to the north. Iowa 99 continued northeasterly until it reached Wapello. There, it crossed the Iowa River again, albeit further upstream, passed through the town, and ended at US 61.

== History ==
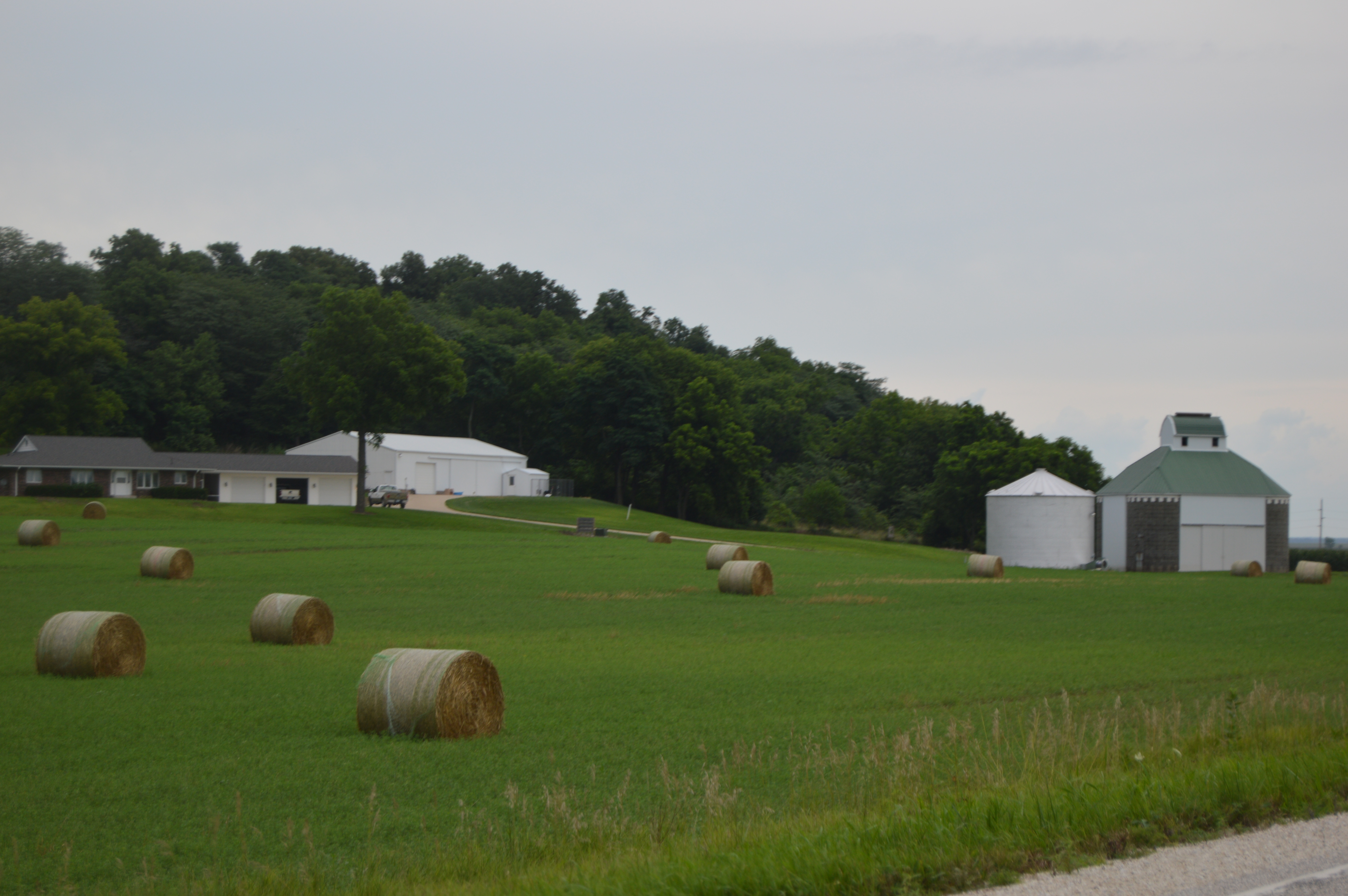
Near Kingston in Des Moines County

Iowa 99 first appeared on the June 1932 state highway map along its familiar routing between Burlington and Wapello. In Louisa County, the highway was a gravel road, while in Des Moines County, the road was unimproved. By 1939, the rest of the road would be graveled and from Burlington north to near Kingston would be paved. In the early 1950s, the middle section, from near Kingston to near Oakville was upgraded to chipseal pavement. By 1956, the entire route was paved.

In 2002, more than 700 miles (1,100 km) of low-traffic state highways, including Iowa 99, were identified by the Iowa Department of Transportation (Iowa DOT) because they primarily served local traffic. Typically, when Iowa DOT wished to transfer a road to a county or locality, both parties had to agree to terms and the DOT would have to either improve the road or give money to the other party to maintain the road. However, with the significant mileage the DOT wished to turn over, the Iowa General Assembly passed a law which granted the DOT a one-time exemption from the transfer rules effective July 1, 2003. Iowa 99 was replaced by CR X99, though some signs in Burlington refer to the road as CR 99.

== Major intersections ==
County	Location	mi	km	Destinations	Notes
Des Moines	Burlington	0.000– 0.230	0.000– 0.370	US 34 / Great River Road south – Mount Pleasant, Illinois	Interchange; southern end of Great River Road overlap
Des Moines	Huron Township	16.097	25.906	CR H38 – Mediapolis	
Louisa	Eliot Township	20.833	33.527	CR H22 to US 61	
Louisa	Jefferson Township	26.451	42.569	Great River Road north / CR X61	Northern end of Great River Road overlap
Louisa	Wapello Township	31.908	51.351	CR G62	
Louisa	Wapello	33.232	53.482	US 61 – Mediapolis, Muscatine	
1.000 mi = 1.609 km; 1.000 km = 0.621 mi: Concurrency terminus
