= Benton Township, Des Moines County, Iowa =

Township in Iowa, United States

Coordinates: 40.9456°N 91.1025°W

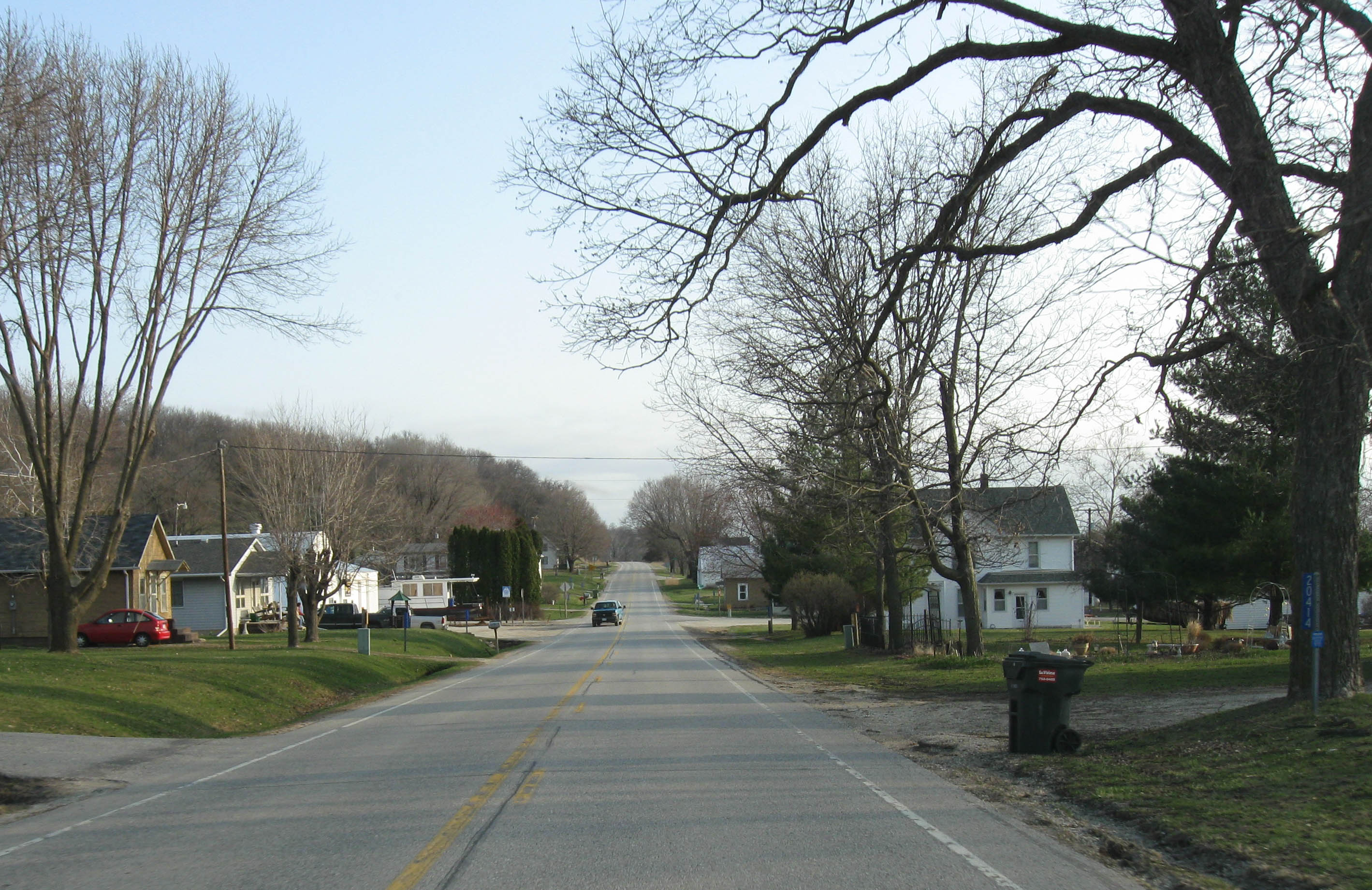
County Road X99 in Kingston.

Benton Township is a township in Des Moines County, Iowa, United States.

== History ==
Benton Township was established in 1841. It was originally called Tamey Township.
