= Concordia Township, Des Moines County, Iowa =

Township in Des Moines County, Iowa, U.S.

Coordinates: 40.7245412°N 91.1185586°W

Concordia Township is a township in Des Moines County, Iowa, United States.

== Geography ==
The Skunk River forms the southern boundaries of Concordia Township, along with Augusta and Union Township.
