= Pleasant Grove Township, Des Moines County, Iowa =

Coordinates: 40.97°N 91.28°W

Pleasant Grove Township
- Township
- Interactive map of Pleasant Grove Township
- Country: United States
- State: Iowa
- County: Des Moines County
- Established: Unknown

Area
  - Total: 36.3 sq mi (94 km^{2})
  - Land: 36.3 sq mi (94 km^{2})
  - Water: 0 sq mi (0 km^{2})

Population
  - Total: 457
- Time zone: UTC-6 (CST)
  - Summer (DST): UTC-5 (CDT)

Pleasant Grove Township is a township in Des Moines County, Iowa, United States. The population is 457 with 227 males and 230 females.

== Major locations ==
=== Churches ===
- Cedar Grove Church
- Shaver Church
- Agape Fellowship Church

=== Cemeteries ===
- Wilcox Cemetery
- Infant Cemetery

=== Reservoirs ===
- Sixmile Creek Watershed Site Three Reservoir
- Sixmile Creek Watershed Site Two Reservoir
- Watson Lake

=== Creeks ===
- Shaver Creek
- Caney Creek
- Little Creek
