= West Burlington, Iowa =

- City
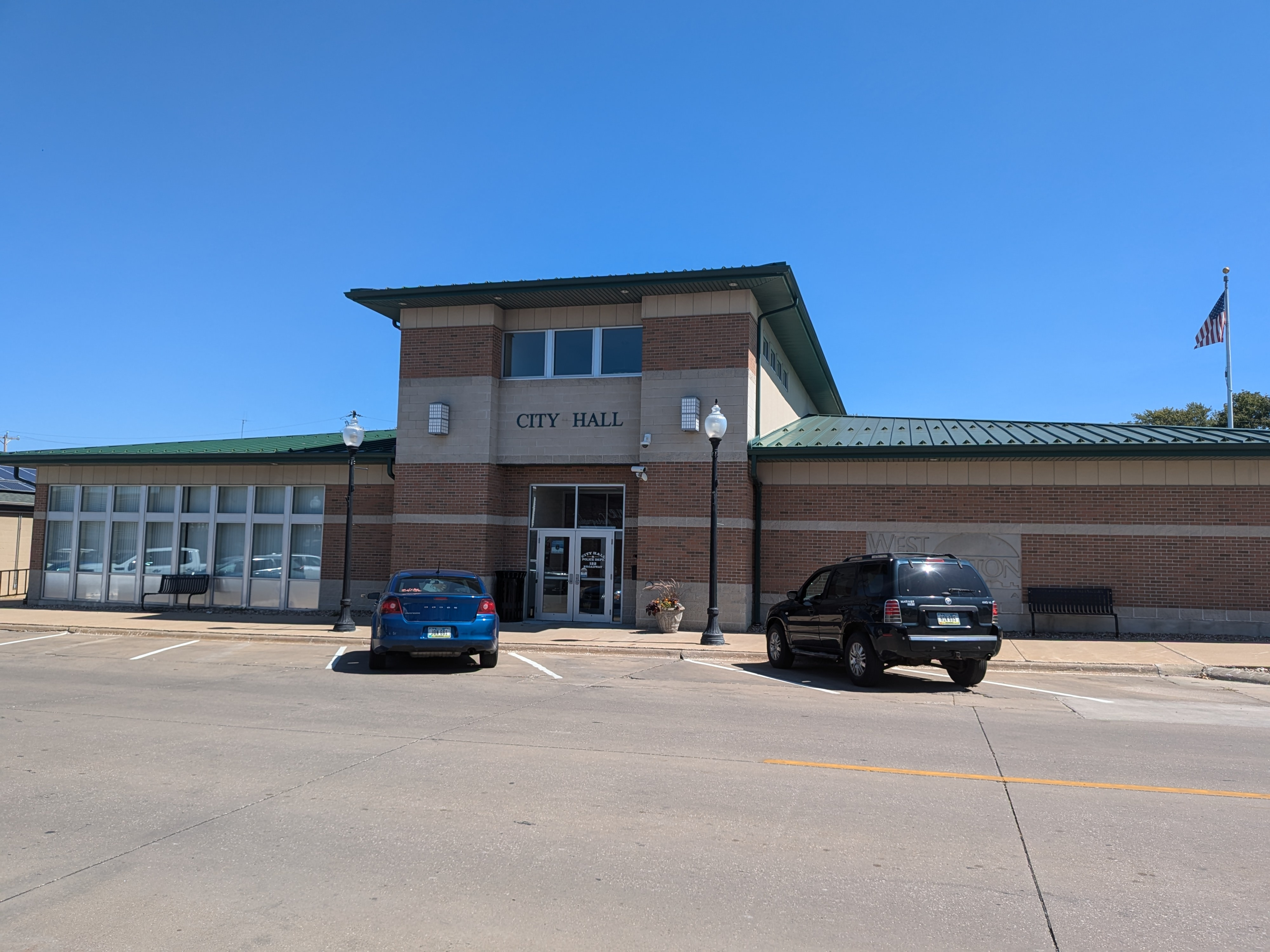
- The West Burlington city hall
- Motto: "A Vibrant, Progressive Community"
- Location of West Burlington, Iowa
- Coordinates: 40°49′18″N 91°10′32″W
- Country: USA
- State: Iowa
- County: Des Moines

Area
  - Total: 4.84 sq mi (12.53 km^{2})
  - Land: 4.84 sq mi (12.53 km^{2})
  - Water: 0 sq mi (0.00 km^{2})
- Elevation: 705 ft (215 m)

Population (2020)
  - Total: 3,197
  - Density: 660.9/sq mi (255.18/km^{2})
- Time zone: UTC-6 (Central (CST))
  - Summer (DST): UTC-5 (CDT)
- ZIP code: 52655
- Area code: 319
- FIPS code: 19-83685
- GNIS feature ID: 2397262
- Website: The City of West Burlington, Iowa

West Burlington is a city in Des Moines County, Iowa, United States, adjacent to the Mississippi River city of Burlington. The population was 3,197 at the 2020 census. It is part of the Burlington, IA–IL Micropolitan Statistical Area.

== Geography ==
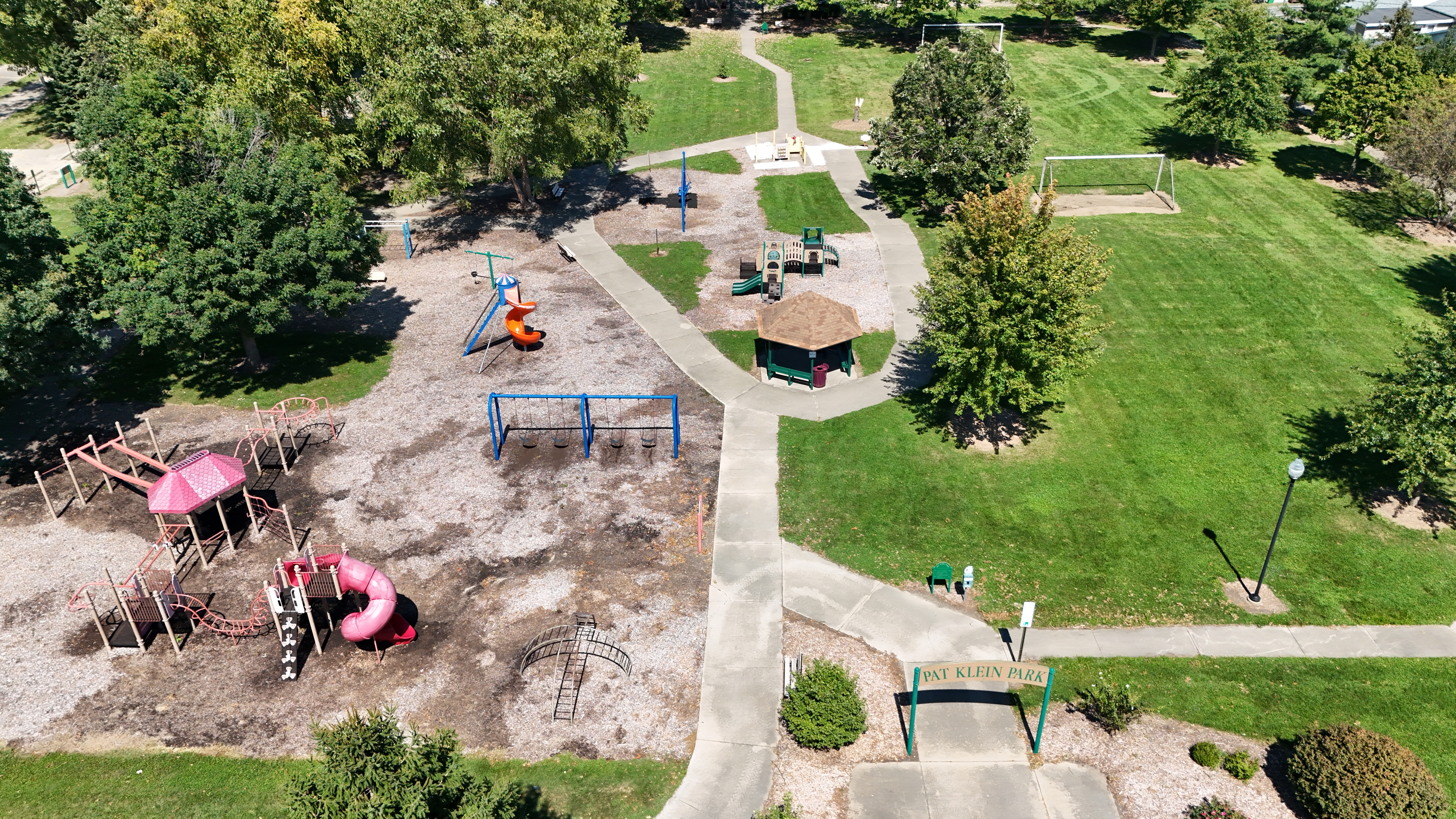
Pat Klein Park in West Burlington

According to the United States Census Bureau, the city has a total area of 4.95 square miles (12.82 km^{2}), all land.

== Demographics ==
Historical populations
Year	Pop.	±%
1890	836	—
1900	1,044	+24.9%
1910	1,206	+15.5%
1920	1,212	+0.5%
1930	1,333	+10.0%
1940	1,323	−0.8%
1950	1,614	+22.0%
1960	2,560	+58.6%
1970	3,139	+22.6%
1980	3,371	+7.4%
1990	3,083	−8.5%
2000	3,161	+2.5%
2010	2,968	−6.1%
2019	2,890	−2.6%
2020	3,197	+10.6%
Source:"U.S. Census website". United States Census Bureau. and Iowa Data Center; Source: U.S. Decennial Census

=== 2020 census ===
As of the 2020 census, West Burlington had a population of 3,197, with 1,395 households and 776 families. The population density was 664.9 inhabitants per square mile (256.7/km^{2}). There were 1,532 housing units at an average density of 318.6 per square mile (123.0/km^{2}).

Of all households, 25.1% had children under the age of 18 living in them. Among households, 37.5% were married-couple households, 6.9% were cohabitating couples, 23.4% were households with a male householder and no spouse or partner present, and 32.2% were households with a female householder and no spouse or partner present. About 44.4% of all households were non-families, 38.7% of households were made up of individuals, and 16.8% had someone living alone who was 65 years of age or older.

The median age was 42.5 years. 24.2% of residents were under the age of 20; 6.1% were between the ages of 20 and 24; 22.1% were from 25 to 44; 23.8% were from 45 to 64; and 23.8% were 65 years of age or older. For every 100 females there were 96.6 males, and for every 100 females age 18 and over there were 92.5 males age 18 and over. The gender makeup of the city was 49.1% male and 50.9% female.

Of all housing units, 8.9% were vacant. The homeowner vacancy rate was 1.1% and the rental vacancy rate was 12.6%. 95.7% of residents lived in urban areas, while 4.3% lived in rural areas.

Racial composition as of the 2020 census
Race	Number	Percent
White	2,640	82.6%
Black or African American	167	5.2%
American Indian and Alaska Native	3	0.1%
Asian	125	3.9%
Native Hawaiian and Other Pacific Islander	0	0.0%
Some other race	61	1.9%
Two or more races	201	6.3%
Hispanic or Latino (of any race)	155	4.8%

=== 2010 census ===
As of the census of 2010, there were 2,968 people, 1,372 households, and 800 families living in the city. The population density was 599.6 inhabitants per square mile (231.5/km^{2}). There were 1,479 housing units at an average density of 298.8 units per square mile (115.4 units/km^{2}). The racial makeup of the city was 90.7% White, 4.1% African American, 0.3% Native American, 1.8% Asian, 0.1% Pacific Islander, 1.0% from other races, and 2.0% from two or more races. Hispanic or Latino of any race were 3.9% of the population.

There were 1,372 households, of which 25.2% had children under the age of 18 living with them, 41.7% were married couples living together, 12.6% had a female householder with no husband present, 4.0% had a male householder with no wife present, and 41.7% were non-families. 36.8% of all households were made up of individuals, and 15.8% had someone living alone who was 65 years of age or older. The average household size was 2.12 and the average family size was 2.76.

The median age in the city was 44.4 years. 20.2% of residents were under the age of 18; 9.1% were between the ages of 18 and 24; 21.4% were from 25 to 44; 29.5% were from 45 to 64; and 19.9% were 65 years of age or older. The gender makeup of the city was 46.9% male and 53.1% female.

=== 2000 census ===
As of the census of 2000, there were 3,161 people, 1,434 households, and 871 families living in the city. The population density was 628.7 inhabitants per square mile (242.7/km^{2}). There were 1,498 housing units at an average density of 297.9 units per square mile (115.0 units/km^{2}). The racial makeup of the city was 94.72% White, 2.50% African American, 0.06% Native American, 1.04% Asian, 0.57% from other races, and 1.11% from two or more races. Hispanic or Latino of any race were 3.07% of the population.

There were 1,434 households, out of which 25.4% had children under the age of 18 living with them, 45.9% were married couples living together, 11.4% had a female householder with no husband present, and 39.2% were non-families. 34.4% of all households were made up of individuals, and 15.6% had someone living alone who was 65 years of age or older. The average household size was 2.18 and the average family size was 2.77.

In the city the population was spread out, with 21.0% under the age of 18, 10.1% from 18 to 24, 24.7% from 25 to 44, 25.1% from 45 to 64, and 19.0% who were 65 years of age or older. The median age was 41 years. For every 100 females, there were 92.7 males. For every 100 females age 18 and over, there were 88.9 males.

The median income for a household in the city was $38,958, and the median income for a family was $45,321. Males had a median income of $34,574 versus $21,225 for females. The per capita income for the city was $19,659. About 4.4% of families and 8.2% of the population were below the poverty line, including 13.1% of those under age 18 and 2.2% of those age 65 or over.

== Education ==
Most residents are in the West Burlington Independent School District.

Some residential developments to the west are in the Burlington Community School District.

== Transportation ==
West Burlington is the hub of Burlington Trailways, an intercity bus operator. As such, West Burlington sees numerous intercity buses operate from its bus station.
