= Franklin Township, Des Moines County, Iowa =

Township in Des Moines County, Iowa

Coordinates: 40.9361°N 91.2011°W

Franklin Township is a township in Des Moines County, Iowa, United States.

== History ==
Franklin Township was established in 1841.
