= Des Moines County Court House =

Courthouse in Burlington, Iowa, United States

- U.S. National Register of Historic Places
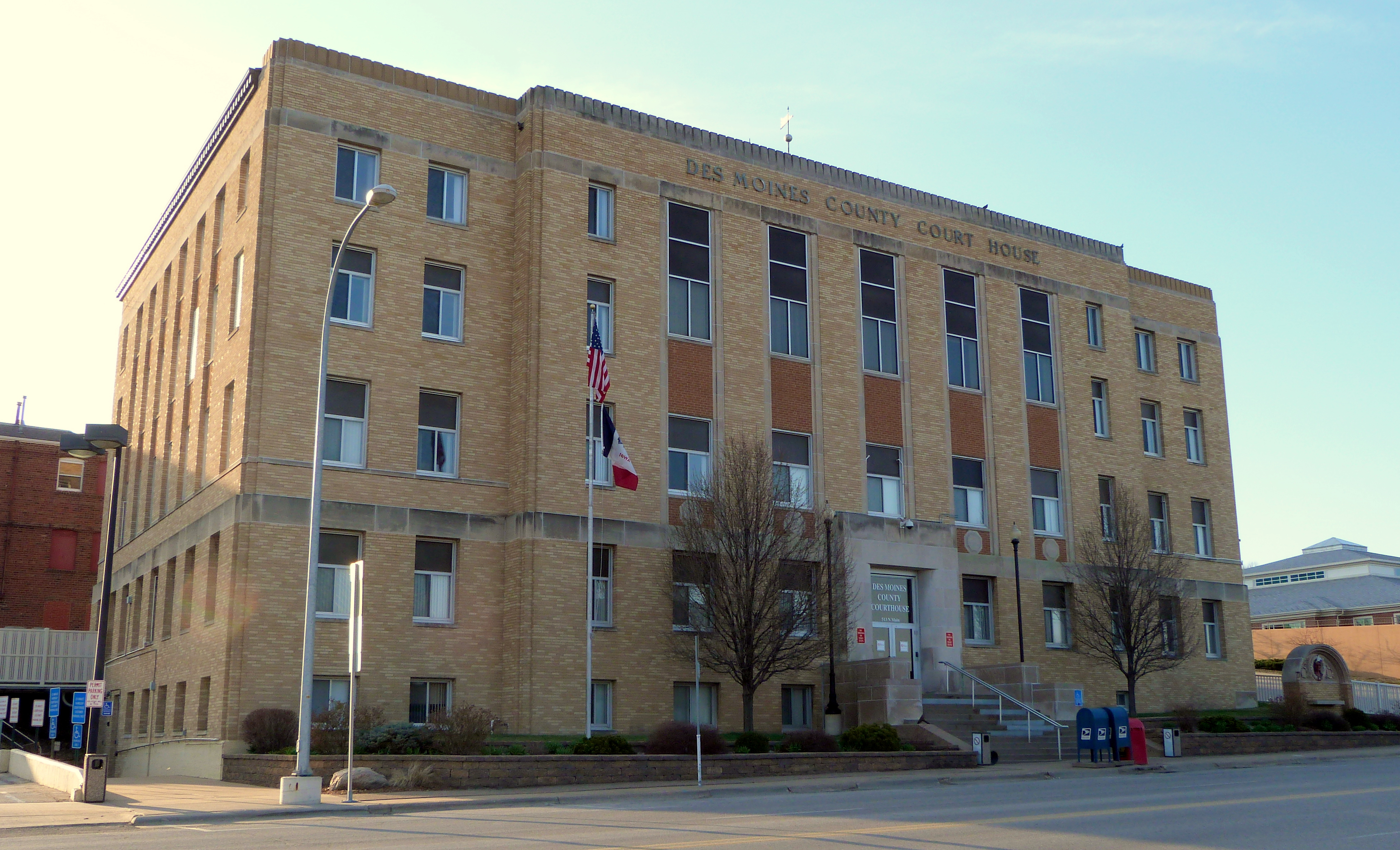
- The Des Moines County Court House in 2013

- Location within Iowa Location within the United States
- Interactive map showing the location of Des Moines County Courthouse
- Location: 513 N. Main Street; Burlington, Iowa
- Coordinates: 40°48′43″N 91°06′04″W
- Area: less than one acre
- Built: 1940
- Built by: Paul Steenberg Construction Co.
- Architect: Keffer and Jones
- Architectural style: PWA Moderne
- MPS: PWA-Era County Courthouses of IA MPS
- NRHP reference No.: 03000817
- Added to NRHP: August 28, 2003

The Des Moines County Court House located in Burlington, Iowa, United States, was built in 1940. It was listed on the National Register of Historic Places in 2003 as a part of the PWA-Era County Courthouses of Iowa Multiple Properties Submission. The courthouse is the fourth structure to house court functions and county administration.

== History ==
The first court sessions in the county were held in log cabins until the county leased Marion Hall. The county purchased Mozart Hall in 1866 which was destroyed in 1873 by a fire that also destroyed many of the county records it housed. County offices again occupied Marion Hall temporarily until 1882 when the new four-story courthouse, designed by Perley Hale, was completed at a cost of $130,000. The building was constructed of sandstone from Ohio and brick and was topped with a cupola. Empty spaces between the ceiling and floor above were filled with concrete in an attempt to fireproof the structure. The county sold the building in 1940 after offices moved into the current courthouse.

The county board of supervisors applied for and received a grant from the Public Works Administration (PWA) in August 1938 to assist with funding for the new courthouse. Voters passed a bond referendum the following month and the board selected the Des Moines architectural firm of Keffer & Jones to design the building. Paul Steenberg Construction Co., of St. Paul, Minnesota, submitted the winning construction bid in February 1939. Final construction costs totaled about $280,000. Construction began a short time after the bidding process, however, poor soil conditions and various labor problems slowed construction. With work nearly finished, county workers moved into the new courthouse in April 1940. The courtroom was dedicated by Justice Oscar Hale of the Iowa Supreme Court on April 6, 1940. A larger celebration was deferred because on the onset of World War II.

== Architecture ==
The architectural style of the building is known as Depression Modern or PWA Moderne. The 126-by-70-foot (38 by 21 m) building features a symmetrical façade with a central section that protrudes slightly forward. The exterior is composed of buff-colored brick and Bedford limestone trim. On the interior, a central corridor extends the length of each floor. Office spaces open onto the corridor and vaults occupy the corners of the structure to house records. The interior featured multi-colored terrazzo floors, marble wainscoting and acoustic tile. Originally, the courtroom was decorated in dark wood tones and Art Deco ornamentation. A single-story addition was added to the north side of the building in the 1970s.

The building is located on a quarter block on the north side of the central business district, overlooking the Mississippi River. The previous courthouse was located a half block to the south. The site itself is a contributing site on the courthouse's nomination to the National Register of Historic Places. Also on the property is a flagpole and a brick and stone monument with a stone carving of the Sauk warrior Black Hawk whose namesake treaty opened this section of Iowa to Euro-American settlement in 1832. The carving was from the old courthouse that was found in storage in the 1960s. The monument was created in 1972. There is also a small freestanding building that is used for transporting county prisoners. It was built in 1997 after the jail was removed from the courthouse in 1997.
