= Washington Township, Des Moines County, Iowa =

Township in Des Moines County, Iowa, U.S.

Coordinates: 40.9935797°N 91.3138446°W

Washington Township is a township in Des Moines County, Iowa, United States.
