= Augusta, Iowa =

- Census-designated place
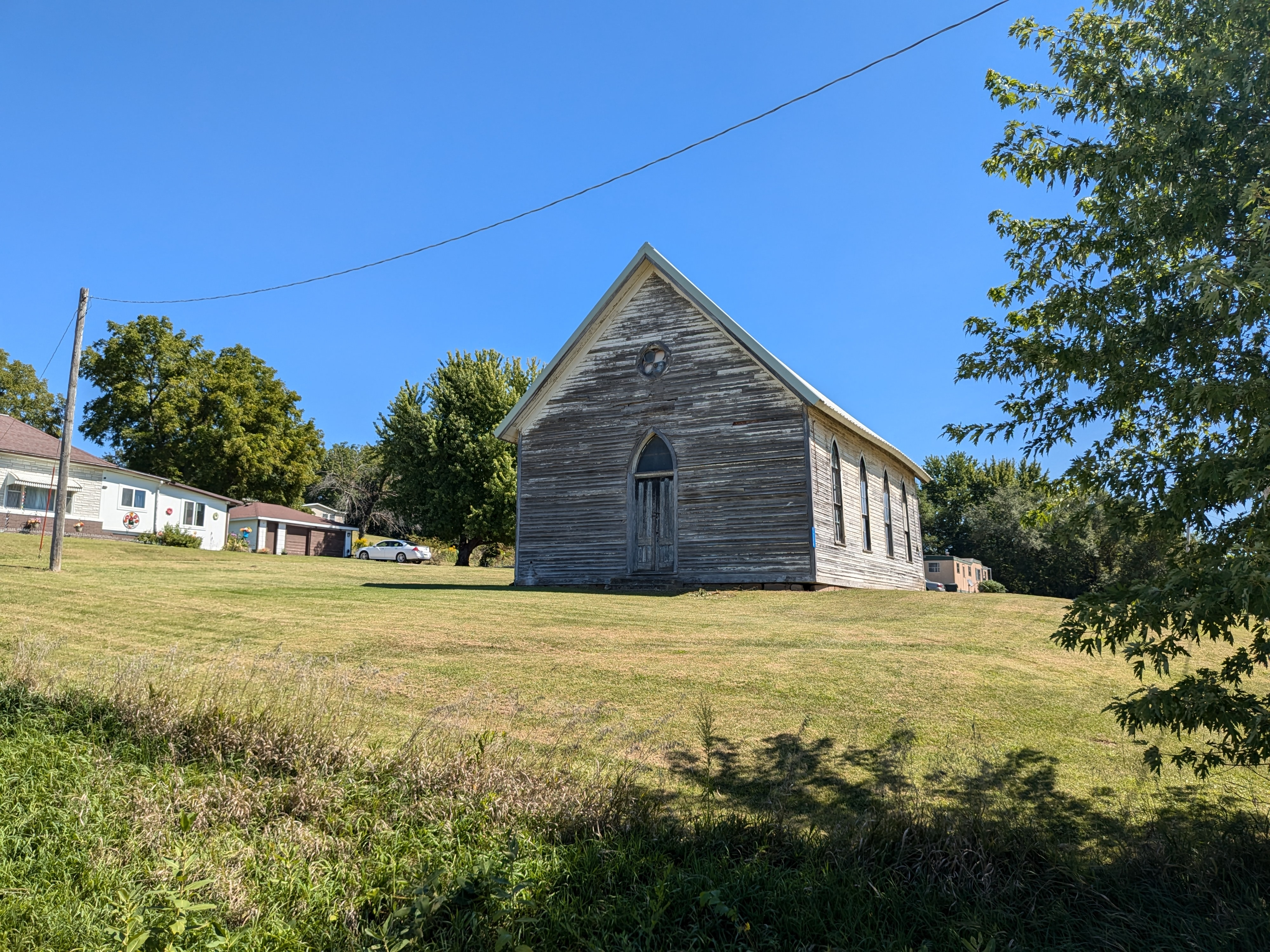
- "The Church on the Hill", a landmark in Augusta

- Location within the state of Iowa Augusta (the United States)
- Coordinates: 40°45′36″N 91°16′37″W
- Country: United States
- State: Iowa
- County: Des Moines

Area
  - Total: 0.84 sq mi (2.18 km^{2})
  - Land: 0.75 sq mi (1.94 km^{2})
  - Water: 0.093 sq mi (0.24 km^{2})
- Elevation: 614 ft (187 m)

Population (2020)
  - Total: 51
  - Density: 68.1/sq mi (26.28/km^{2})
- Time zone: UTC-6 (Central (CST))
  - Summer (DST): UTC-5 (CDT)
- Area code: 319
- FIPS code: 19-03700
- GNIS feature ID: 2804120

Augusta is an unincorporated community and census-designated place (CDP) situated on the Skunk River in Des Moines County, Iowa, United States. It is located 10 miles southwest of Burlington and nine miles north of Fort Madison, off U.S. Route 61 and Iowa Highway 16. The community is part of the Burlington, IA–IL Micropolitan Statistical Area.

As of the 2020 census, Augusta had a population of 51.

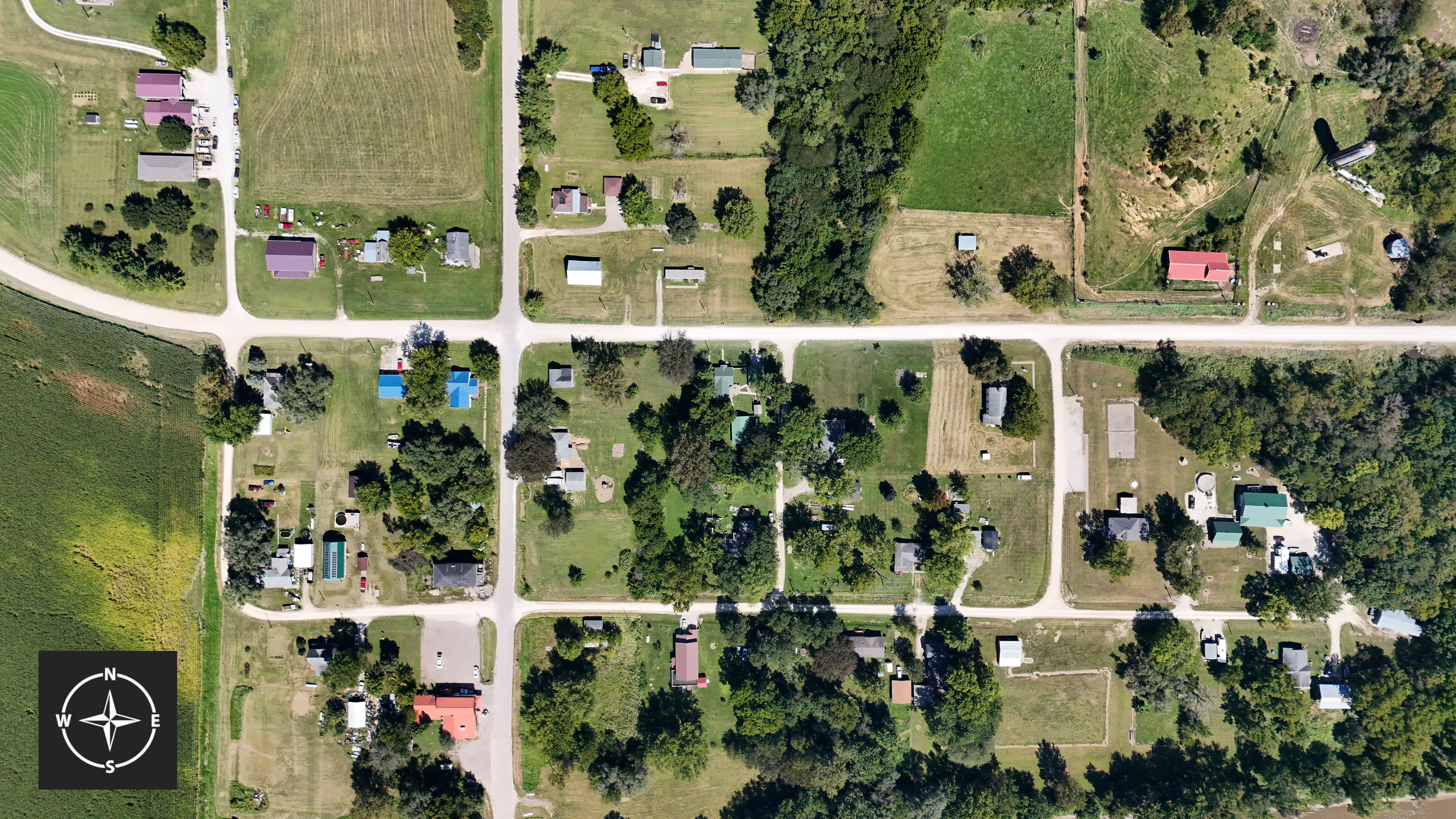
An aerial view of Augusta, taken on September 4, 2024

== History ==
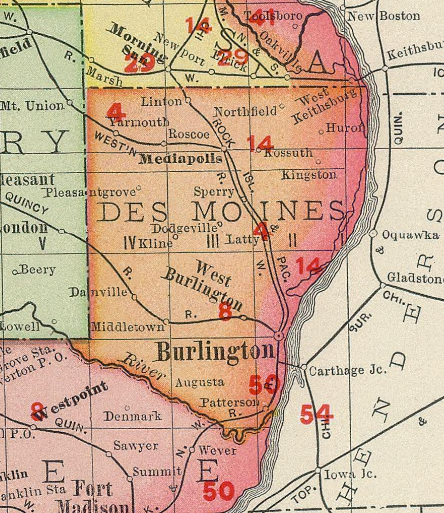
Augusta in Des Moines County Iowa, in 1903

In 1835, Levi Moffitt, one of the first settlers, built the first water-power "flouring" mill in the state of Iowa. In 1842, Moffitt and Dan Jones built a church in Augusta, and helped to transport immigrants up the river to Nauvoo. The means of travel was a small steamboat that was called the Maid of Iowa, which was captained by Dan Jones.

The Augusta Academy, a co-educational institution, was established in Augusta in January 1839. This was followed by the Augusta Literary and Debating Society, founded in 1879.

The first postmaster of Augusta was Joshua Holland, appointed on October 2, 1846.

== Demographics ==
Historical population
Census	Pop.	Note	%±
2020	51		—
U.S. Decennial Census

Augusta's population was 163 in 1902, and 110 in 1925. The population was 87 in 1940.

=== 2020 census ===
As of the census of 2020, there were 51 people, 29 households, and 21 families residing in the community. The population density was 68.1 inhabitants per square mile (26.3/km^{2}). There were 32 housing units at an average density of 42.7 per square mile (16.5/km^{2}). The racial makeup of the community was 100.0% White, 0.0% Black or African American, 0.0% Native American, 0.0% Asian, 0.0% Pacific Islander, 0.0% from other races and 0.0% from two or more races. Hispanic or Latino persons of any race comprised 0.0% of the population.

Of the 29 households, 31.0% of which had children under the age of 18 living with them, 51.7% were married couples living together, 17.2% were cohabitating couples, 13.8% had a female householder with no spouse or partner present and 17.2% had a male householder with no spouse or partner present. 27.6% of all households were non-families. 13.8% of all households were made up of individuals, 10.3% had someone living alone who was 65 years old or older.

The median age in the community was 53.8 years. 7.8% of the residents were under the age of 20; 11.8% were between the ages of 20 and 24; 19.6% were from 25 and 44; 25.5% were from 45 and 64; and 35.3% were 65 years of age or older. The gender makeup of the community was 64.7% male and 35.3% female.
