= Des Moines County, Iowa =

County in Iowa, United States

- County
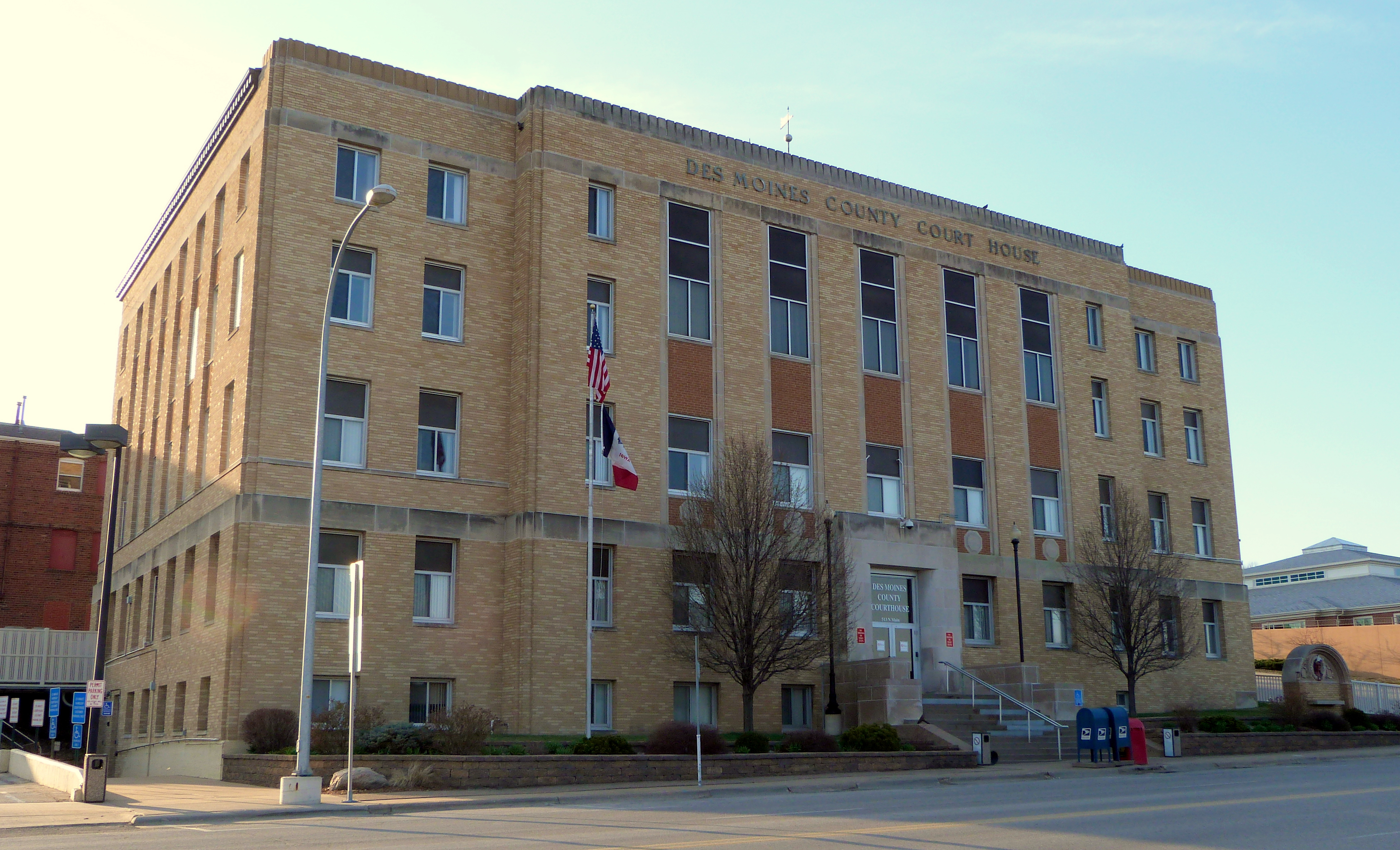
- The Des Moines County Courthouse in Burlington

- Location within the U.S. state of Iowa
- Coordinates: 40.915339°N 91.186925°W
- Country: United States
- State: Iowa
- Founded: October 1, 1834
- Named for: Des Moines River
- Seat: Burlington
- Largest city: Burlington

Area
  - Total: 429.775 sq mi (1,113.11 km^{2})
  - Land: 416.129 sq mi (1,077.77 km^{2})
  - Water: 13.646 sq mi (35.34 km^{2}) 3.18%

Population (2020)
  - Total: 38,910
  - Estimate (2025): 38,077 ▼
  - Density: 93.50/sq mi (36.10/km^{2})
- Time zone: UTC−6 (Central)
  - Summer (DST): UTC−5 (CDT)
- Area code: 319
- Congressional district: 1st
- Website: desmoinescounty.iowa.gov
- Iowa county number 29

Des Moines County is located in the U.S. state of Iowa. As of the 2020 census, the population was 38,910, and was estimated to be 38,077 in 2025. The county seat and largest city is Burlington. It is one of Iowa's two original counties along with Dubuque County; both were organized by the Michigan Territorial legislature in 1834. Des Moines County is part of the Burlington micropolitan statistical area.

Des Moines County sits on Iowa's eastern border alongside the Mississippi River. The city of Des Moines is in Polk County in central Iowa. Both places derive their name from the Des Moines River, which flows through the city of Des Moines and originally flowed through the county. When the county was divided early in Iowa's history, the river ended up further west, forming the border between Lee County, Iowa and the state of Missouri.

== History ==
At an extra session of the Sixth Legislative Assembly of Michigan Territory held in September 1834, the Iowa District was divided into two counties by running a line due west from the lower end of Rock Island in the Mississippi River. The territory north of this line (which started just south of the present-day Davenport) was named Dubuque County, and all south of it was Demoine County. It was named after the Des Moines River. From July 3, 1836, until July 3, 1838, Des Moines County was part of Wisconsin Territory. The county underwent various border changes during this time. July 4, 1838, the named county became part of Iowa Territory (later the state of Iowa).

The current Des Moines County Court House was completed in 1940. The Iowa Army Ammunition Plant was also established in 1940.

== Geography ==
According to the United States Census Bureau, the county has a total area of 429.775 square miles (1,113.11 km^{2}), of which 416.129 square miles (1,077.77 km^{2}) is land and 13.646 square miles (35.34 km^{2}) (3.18%) is water. It is the 93rd largest county in Iowa by total area.

The Mississippi River forms the east border; Skunk River, the south border; and the county is drained by Flint Creek.

=== Major highways ===
- U.S. Highway 34
- U.S. Highway 61

=== Transit ===
- Burlington station
- Burlington Urban Service

=== Airport ===
The Southeast Iowa Regional Airport (IATA code BRL), is located on the southern side of Burlington.

=== Adjacent counties ===
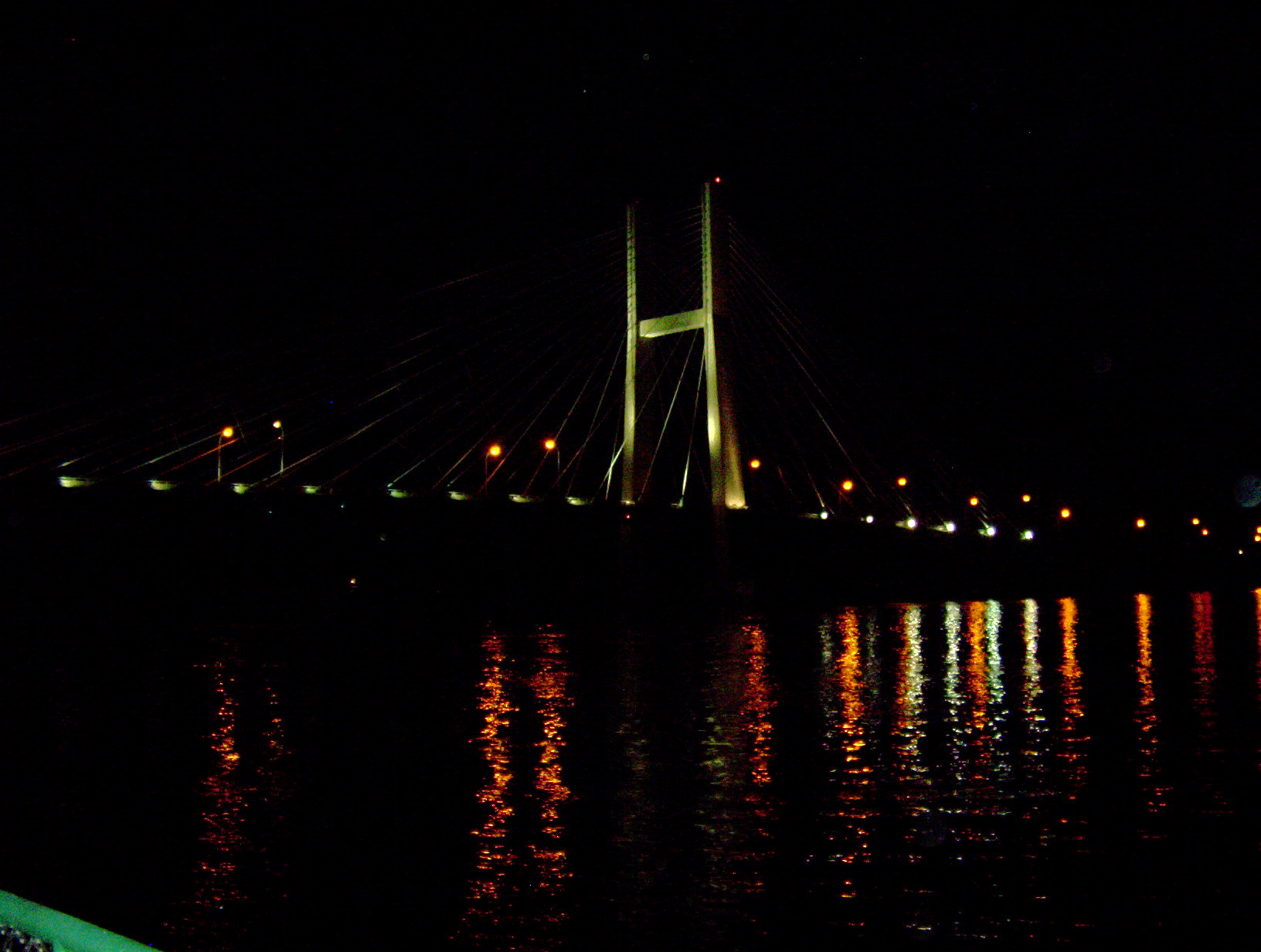
The U.S. Highway 34 bridge over the Mississippi River in Burlington

== Demographics ==
Historical population
Census	Pop.	Note	%±
1850	12,988		—
1860	19,611		51.0%
1870	27,256		39.0%
1880	33,099		21.4%
1890	35,324		6.7%
1900	35,989		1.9%
1910	36,145		0.4%
1920	35,520		−1.7%
1930	38,162		7.4%
1940	36,804		−3.6%
1950	42,056		14.3%
1960	44,605		6.1%
1970	46,982		5.3%
1980	46,203		−1.7%
1990	42,614		−7.8%
2000	42,351		−0.6%
2010	40,325		−4.8%
2020	38,910		−3.5%
2025 (est.)	38,077	▼	−2.1%
U.S. Decennial Census; 1790–1960 1900–1990; 1990–2000 2010–2020

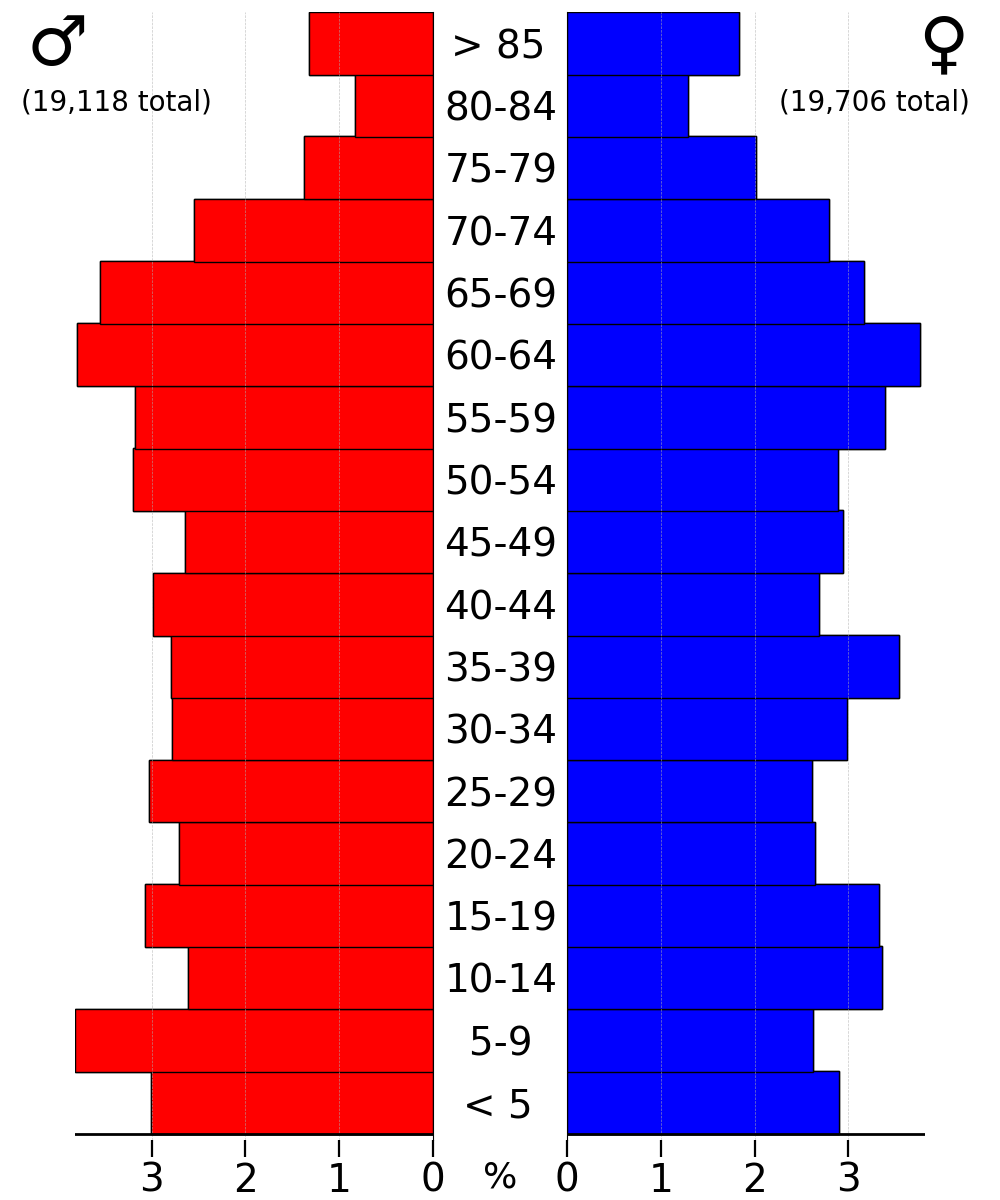
2022 US Census population pyramid for Des Moines County from ACS 5-year estimates

As of the second quarter of 2025, the median home value in Des Moines County was $154,139.

As of the 2023 American Community Survey, there are 17,188 estimated households in Des Moines County with an average of 2.21 persons per household. The county has a median household income of $60,662. Approximately 14.1% of the county's population lives at or below the poverty line. Des Moines County has an estimated 59.3% employment rate, with 23.8% of the population holding a bachelor's degree or higher and 94.0% holding a high school diploma. There were 18,778 housing units at an average density of 45.13 per square mile (17.4/km^{2}).

The top five reported languages (people were allowed to report up to two languages, thus the figures will generally add to more than 100%) were English (96.3%), Spanish (2.2%), Indo-European (0.5%), Asian and Pacific Islander (0.9%), and Other (0.1%).

The median age in the county was 42.2 years.

Des Moines County, Iowa – racial and ethnic composition Note: the US Census treats Hispanic/Latino as an ethnic category. This table excludes Latinos from the racial categories and assigns them to a separate category. Hispanics/Latinos may be of any race.
Race / ethnicity (NH = non-Hispanic)	Pop. 1980	Pop. 1990	Pop. 2000	Pop. 2010	Pop. 2020
White alone (NH)	44,476 (96.26%)	40,506 (95.05%)	39,308 (92.81%)	36,059 (89.42%)	32,753 (84.18%)
Black or African American alone (NH)	1,003 (2.17%)	1,310 (3.07%)	1,488 (3.51%)	2,005 (4.97%)	2,501 (6.43%)
Native American or Alaska Native alone (NH)	63 (0.14%)	68 (0.16%)	93 (0.22%)	88 (0.22%)	67 (0.17%)
Asian alone (NH)	122 (0.26%)	221 (0.52%)	245 (0.58%)	285 (0.71%)	398 (1.02%)
Pacific Islander alone (NH)	—	—	11 (0.03%)	18 (0.04%)	21 (0.05%)
Other race alone (NH)	74 (0.16%)	17 (0.04%)	39 (0.09%)	25 (0.06%)	128 (0.33%)
Mixed race or multiracial (NH)	—	—	427 (1.01%)	803 (1.99%)	1,797 (4.62%)
Hispanic or Latino (any race)	465 (1.01%)	492 (1.15%)	740 (1.75%)	1,042 (2.58%)	1,245 (3.20%)
Total	46,203 (100.00%)	42,614 (100.00%)	42,351 (100.00%)	40,325 (100.00%)	38,910 (100.00%)

=== 2024 estimate ===
As of the 2024 estimate, there were 38,411 people, 17,188 households, and _ families residing in the county. The population density was 92.31 inhabitants per square mile (35.6/km^{2}). There were 18,778 housing units at an average density of 45.13 per square mile (17.4/km^{2}). The racial makeup of the county was 87.9% White (84.7% NH White), 6.6% African American, 0.4% Native American, 1.8% Asian, 0.1% Pacific Islander, _% from some other races and 3.3% from two or more races. Hispanic or Latino people of any race were 4.1% of the population.

=== 2020 census ===
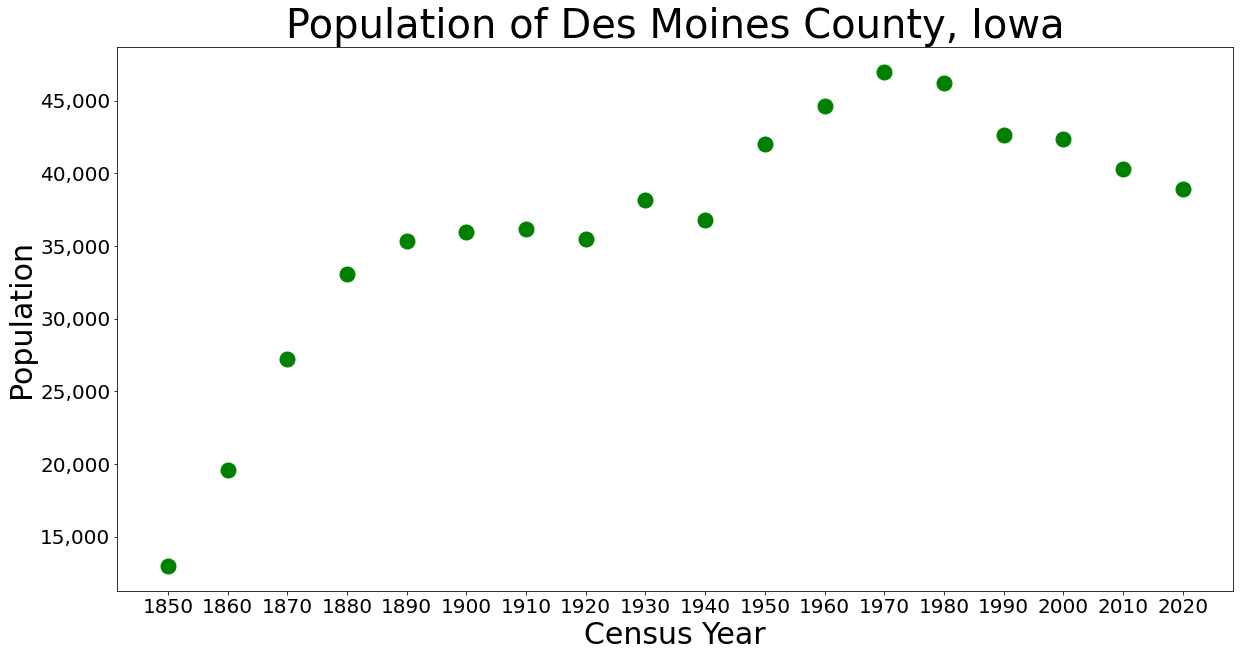
Population of Des Moines County from the U.S. census data

As of the 2020 census, there were 38,910 people, 16,751 households, and 10,297 families residing in the county. The population density was 93.50 inhabitants per square mile (36.1/km^{2}). There were 18,782 housing units at an average density of 45.14 per square mile (17.4/km^{2}). The racial makeup of the county was 85.23% White, 6.51% African American, 0.20% Native American, 1.04% Asian, 0.06% Pacific Islander, 1.22% from some other races and 5.74% from two or more races. Hispanic or Latino people of any race were 3.20% of the population.

The median age was 42.9 years. 21.8% of residents were under the age of 18 and 21.7% of residents were 65 years of age or older. For every 100 females there were 96.3 males, and for every 100 females age 18 and over there were 94.3 males age 18 and over.

There were 16,751 households in the county, of which 26.3% had children under the age of 18 living in them. Of all households, 43.9% were married-couple households, 20.0% were households with a male householder and no spouse or partner present, and 28.4% were households with a female householder and no spouse or partner present. About 32.6% of all households were made up of individuals and 15.4% had someone living alone who was 65 years of age or older.

There were 18,782 housing units, of which 10.8% were vacant. Among occupied housing units, 70.7% were owner-occupied and 29.3% were renter-occupied. The homeowner vacancy rate was 3.0% and the rental vacancy rate was 11.0%.

73.0% of residents lived in urban areas, while 27.0% lived in rural areas.

=== 2010 census ===
As of the 2010 census, there were 40,325 people, 17,003 households, and _ families residing in the county. The population density was 96.91 inhabitants per square mile (37.4/km^{2}). There were 18,535 housing units at an average density of 44.54 per square mile (17.2/km^{2}). The racial makeup of the county was 91.02% White, 5.08% African American, 0.25% Native American, 0.72% Asian, 0.05% Pacific Islander, 0.58% from some other races and 2.31% from two or more races. Hispanic or Latino people of any race were 2.58% of the population.

=== 2000 census ===
As of the 2000 census, there were 42,351 people, 17,270 households, and 11,536 families residing in the county. The population density was 102.0 inhabitants per square mile (39.4/km^{2}). There were 18,643 housing units at an average density of 45.0 per square mile (17.4/km^{2}). The racial makeup of the county was 93.69% White, 3.57% African American, 0.25% Native American, 0.59% Asian, 0.05% Pacific Islander, 0.68% from some other races and 1.18% from two or more races. Hispanic or Latino people of any race were 1.75% of the population.

There were 17,270 households, out of which 29.60% had children under the age of 18 living with them, 52.70% were married couples living together, 10.50% had a female householder with no husband present, and 33.20% were non-families. 28.60% of all households were made up of individuals, and 12.60% had someone living alone who was 65 years of age or older. The average household size was 2.40 and the average family size was 2.94.

In the county, the population was spread out, with 24.40% under the age of 18, 8.50% from 18 to 24, 26.10% from 25 to 44, 24.30% from 45 to 64, and 16.70% who were 65 years of age or older. The median age was 39 years. For every 100 females, there were 93.50 males. For every 100 females age 18 and over, there were 90.30 males.

The median income for a household in the county was $36,790, and the median income for a family was $45,089. Males had a median income of $34,880 versus $22,530 for females. The per capita income for the county was $19,701. About 8.20% of families and 10.70% of the population were below the poverty line, including 17.30% of those under age 18 and 7.40% of those age 65 or over.

== Communities ==
=== Cities ===
- Burlington
- Danville
- Mediapolis
- Middletown
- West Burlington

=== Census-designated places ===
- Augusta
- Beaverdale
- Kingston
- Oak Hills
- Sperry
- Yarmouth

=== Other unincorporated communities ===
- Dodgeville

=== Townships ===
- Benton
- Concordia
- Danville
- Flint River
- Franklin
- Huron
- Jackson
- Pleasant Grove
- Tama
- Union
- Washington
- Yellow Springs

=== Population ranking ===
The population ranking of the following table is based on the 2020 census of Des Moines County.

† county seat

Rank	City/Town/etc.	Municipal type	Population (2020 Census)	Population (2024 Estimate)
1	† Burlington	City	23,982	23,637
2	West Burlington	City	3,197	3,249
3	Mediapolis	City	1,688	1,712
4	Danville	City	927	918
5	Beaverdale	CDP	880	914
6	Middletown	City	363	388
7	Oak Hills	CDP	186	211
8	Sperry	CDP	124	122
9	Yarmouth	CDP	61	94
10	Kingston	CDP	81	90
11	Augusta	CDP	51	47

== Politics ==
From 1896 through 1960, Des Moines County was a primarily Republican county, backing Democratic nominees only four times in the period (Woodrow Wilson in 1912, with a low plurality; Franklin Roosevelt in his two landslides in 1932 and 1936; and Harry Truman in 1948). From 1964 through 2012, it became a Democratic stronghold, backing the Democratic nominee in every election in this period save in Nixon's 1972 landslide. In 2016, Donald Trump became the first Republican since 1972 to carry the county, despite narrowly losing the overall national popular vote; the county swung over 25% in his favor relative to its 2012 vote. The change to the GOP happened while the county experienced an economic decline. In 2020 and 2024, Trump again carried the county, with an increased vote share each time, the first time the county has voted Republican three times in a row since between 1952 and 1960.

United States presidential election results for Des Moines County, Iowa
Year	Republican		Democratic		Third party(ies)	
Year	No.	%	No.	%	No.	%
1896	4,549	53.06%	3,741	43.63%	284	3.31%
1900	4,315	50.72%	3,909	45.94%	284	3.34%
1904	4,496	54.18%	3,043	36.67%	760	9.16%
1908	4,153	48.92%	3,975	46.83%	361	4.25%
1912	2,136	26.49%	3,169	39.30%	2,759	34.21%
1916	4,132	49.51%	3,827	45.86%	386	4.63%
1920	8,287	63.76%	3,449	26.54%	1,261	9.70%
1924	7,995	53.98%	2,616	17.66%	4,199	28.35%
1928	10,547	64.70%	5,578	34.22%	177	1.09%
1932	5,590	35.66%	9,395	59.94%	690	4.40%
1936	6,763	43.06%	7,011	44.64%	1,931	12.30%
1940	10,988	62.34%	6,578	37.32%	59	0.33%
1944	9,488	55.24%	7,543	43.91%	146	0.85%
1948	7,621	45.56%	8,792	52.56%	316	1.89%
1952	12,182	58.13%	8,686	41.45%	89	0.42%
1956	11,152	55.88%	8,781	44.00%	25	0.13%
1960	10,678	51.86%	9,872	47.94%	41	0.20%
1964	5,830	29.50%	13,894	70.31%	38	0.19%
1968	8,452	42.30%	10,164	50.87%	1,363	6.82%
1972	10,216	52.77%	8,869	45.82%	273	1.41%
1976	9,023	43.94%	11,268	54.87%	245	1.19%
1980	9,158	44.85%	9,977	48.87%	1,282	6.28%
1984	9,559	45.85%	11,173	53.59%	118	0.57%
1988	7,652	39.50%	11,593	59.84%	129	0.67%
1992	6,378	30.10%	11,309	53.37%	3,503	16.53%
1996	5,778	31.11%	10,761	57.94%	2,035	10.96%
2000	7,385	38.14%	11,351	58.62%	629	3.25%
2004	8,221	39.38%	12,456	59.67%	197	0.94%
2008	7,721	37.53%	12,462	60.57%	391	1.90%
2012	8,136	39.91%	11,888	58.32%	361	1.77%
2016	9,529	49.88%	8,212	42.99%	1,362	7.13%
2020	10,592	53.08%	8,893	44.56%	471	2.36%
2024	10,794	56.65%	7,935	41.64%	325	1.71%

== See also ==
- National Register of Historic Places listings in Des Moines County, Iowa
