= Tama Township, Des Moines County, Iowa =

Township in Des Moines County, Iowa, U.S.

Coordinates: 40.8712597°N 91.0886085°W

Tama Township is a township in Des Moines County, Iowa, United States. It is settled on the Mississippi River and includes multiple islands in its boundaries.

== Geography ==
Tama Township has three islands, being O'Connell Island, Rush Island and Otter Island. Rush Island and Otter Island are both approximately 2 miles long and a half-mile wide.
