= Huron Township, Des Moines County, Iowa =

Township in Iowa, U.S.

Coordinates: 41.0294°N 91.0217°W

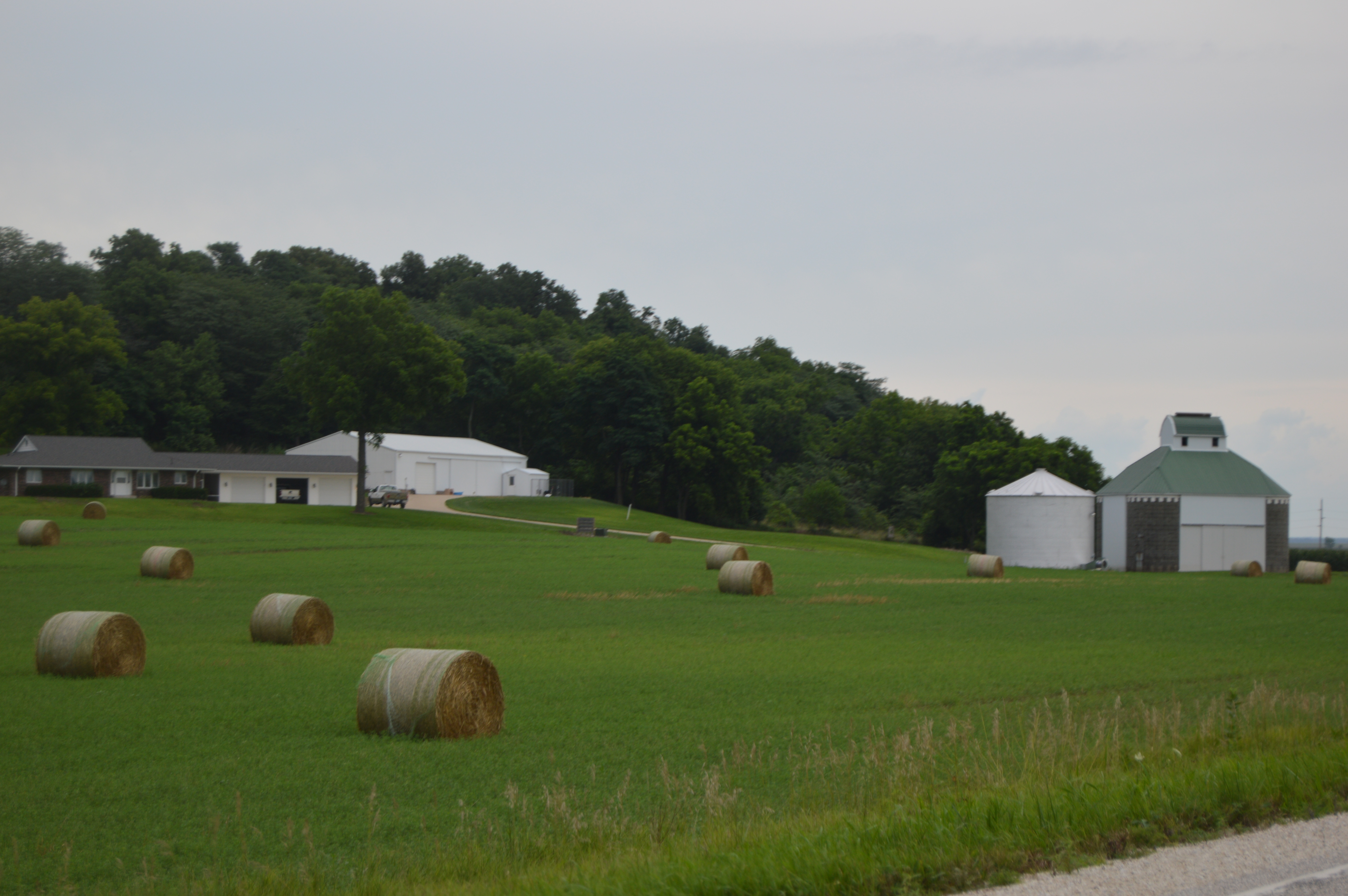
North of Kingston on County Road X99

Huron Township is a township in Des Moines County, Iowa, United States.

== History ==
Huron Township was established in 1848.
