= Kingston, Iowa =

- Census-designated place
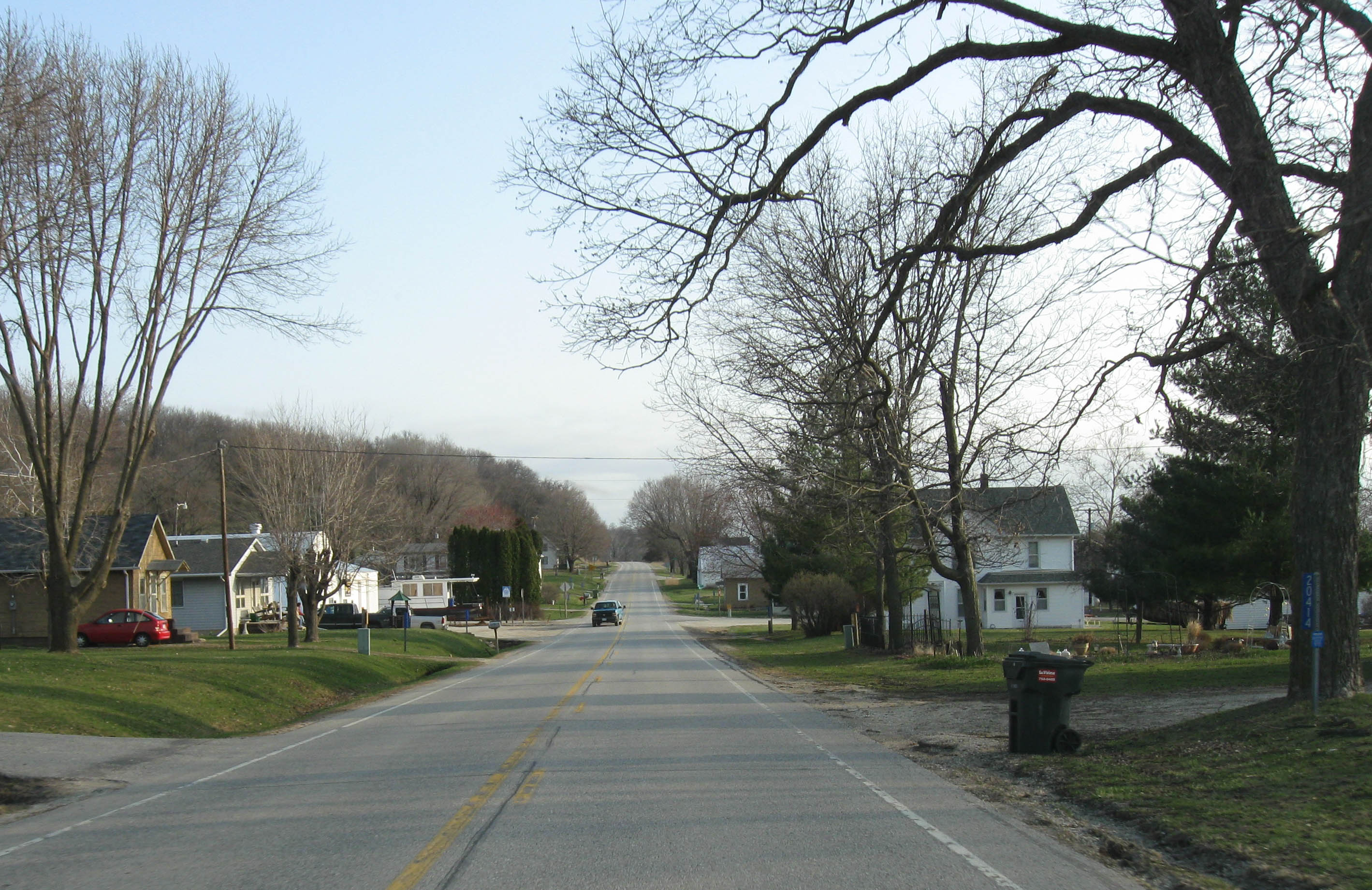
- Streetside in Kingston

- Location within the state of Iowa Kingston (the United States)
- Coordinates: 40°58′36″N 91°2′26″W
- Country: United States
- State: Iowa
- County: Des Moines

Area
  - Total: 1.77 sq mi (4.59 km^{2})
  - Land: 1.77 sq mi (4.59 km^{2})
  - Water: 0 sq mi (0.00 km^{2})
- Elevation: 653 ft (199 m)

Population (2020)
  - Total: 81
  - Density: 45.7/sq mi (17.65/km^{2})
- Time zone: UTC-6 (Central (CST))
  - Summer (DST): UTC-5 (CDT)
- ZIP codes: 52637
- Area code: 319
- FIPS code: 19-41430
- GNIS feature ID: 2804122

Kingston is an unincorporated community and census-designated place (CDP) in Des Moines County, Iowa, United States. As of the 2020 census, Kingston had a population of 81. It is part of the Burlington, IA–IL Micropolitan Statistical Area. Kingston is located along State Highway 99, approximately 15 miles north of Burlington.

== Demographics ==
Historical population
Census	Pop.	Note	%±
2020	81		—
U.S. Decennial Census

=== 2020 census ===
As of the census of 2020, there were 81 people, 34 households, and 29 families residing in the city. The population density was 45.7 inhabitants per square mile (17.7/km^{2}). There were 42 housing units at an average density of 23.7 per square mile (9.2/km^{2}). The racial makeup of the city was 98.8% White, 0.0% Black or African American, 0.0% Native American, 0.0% Asian, 0.0% Pacific Islander, 0.0% from other races and 1.2% from two or more races. Hispanic or Latino persons of any race comprised 0.0% of the population.

Of the 34 households, 23.5% of which had children under the age of 18 living with them, 82.4% were married couples living together, 2.9% were cohabitating couples, 2.9% had a female householder with no spouse or partner present and 11.8% had a male householder with no spouse or partner present. 14.7% of all households were non-families. 14.7% of all households were made up of individuals, 2.9% had someone living alone who was 65 years old or older.

The median age in the city was 43.5 years. 17.3% of the residents were under the age of 20; 12.3% were between the ages of 20 and 24; 24.7% were from 25 and 44; 22.2% were from 45 and 64; and 23.5% were 65 years of age or older. The gender makeup of the city was 55.6% male and 44.4% female.

== History ==
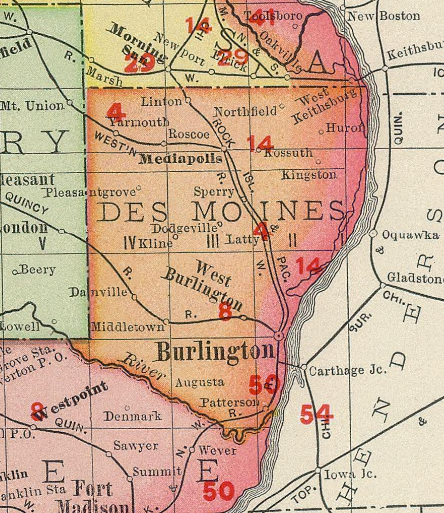
Kingston in Des Moines County Iowa, in 1903

Kingston is known for its Late Prehistoric Kingston Oneota Site and it is close to the Malchow Mounds State Preserve and the grave of Taimah, a native chieftain.

Kingston was named for its founder, W. King. The population was 90 in 1940.
