= Danville Township, Des Moines County, Iowa =

Township in Des Moines County, Iowa, U.S.

Coordinates: 40.8483°N 91.3225°W

Danville Township is a township in Des Moines County, Iowa, United States.

== History ==
Danville Township was established in 1841.
