= Flint River Township, Des Moines County, Iowa =

Township in Des Moines County, Iowa, U.S.

Coordinates: 40.8603°N 91.1994°W

Flint River Township is a township in Des Moines County, Iowa, United States.

== History ==
Flint River Township was established in 1841.

== Government ==
=== Township Trustees ===
- Ted Horn – Trustee (term ends 2026)
- Curtis Schenk – Trustee (term ends 2028)
- Matt Trexel – Trustee (term ends 2026)

=== Township Clerk ===
- Douglas Beckman – Clerk (term ends 2026)

== Emergency services ==
Flint River Township receives fire protection and emergency medical services through the Burlington Fire Department as part of its Quad Townships service area. The department provides coverage to the City of Burlington and the surrounding rural townships of Concordia, Flint River, Tama, and Union. Services include fire suppression, advanced life support ambulance response, hazardous materials response, rescue operations, and fire prevention programs.

== Cemeteries ==
Flint River Township contains the following cemeteries, as listed by Des Moines County:

- Flint River Township Cemetery (Ripley Cemetery)
- Greenwood Cemetery (Burk Cemetery)
- Inghram Cemetery (Schnupper Farm Cemetery)
- Johnson Family Cemetery
- Old Middletown Cemetery (Leuins Point Cemetery)
- Prairie Grove Cemetery
- Schilb / Bolick Cemetery
- St. John's United Church of Christ Cemetery
- Walker Family Plot
