= Union Township, Des Moines County, Iowa =

Township in Des Moines County, Iowa, U.S.

Coordinates: 40.7689°N 91.2131°W

Union Township is a township in Des Moines County, Iowa, United States.

== History ==
Union Township was established in 1841.
