= Gearhart =

Gearhart can refer to:

== Business ==
- Gearhart Industries, an oil well service company

== People ==
- Bertrand W. Gearhart (1890-1955), American lawyer and politician
- Devon Gearhart (born 1995), American teen actor
- Frances Gearhart (1869–1959), American printmaker
- Gary Gearhart (1923– 2001), Major League Baseball outfielder
- G. David Gearhart (born 1952), fifth chancellor of the University of Arkansas
- Jason Gearhart, American politician
- May Gearhart (1872–1951), American printmaker
- Sally Miller Gearhart (1931-2021), American teacher, feminist, science fiction writer, and political activist

== Places ==
- Gearhart Mountain Wilderness, an area in south-central Oregon
- Gearhart, Oregon, a city in Clatsop County, Oregon
