= U.S. Route 34 in Illinois =

US Highway section within the state of Illinois

U.S. Route 34
- Walter Payton Memorial Highway; Ogden Avenue
- US 34 highlighted in red

Route information
- Maintained by IDOT
- Length: 211.37 mi (340.17 km)
- Existed: 1926–present

Major junctions
- West end: US 34 / Iowa 163 in Gulfport
- US 67 / IL 110 (CKC) / IL 164 in Monmouth; US 150 in Galesburg; I-74 / IL 110 (CKC) in Galesburg; US 6 / IL 26 in Princeton; US 52 in Mendota; I-39 / US 51 in Mendota; US 30 in Montgomery; I-355 Toll in Downers Grove; I-294 Toll in Western Springs; US 12 / US 20 / US 45 in LaGrange
- East end: IL 43 in Berwyn

Location
- Country: United States
- State: Illinois
- Counties: Henderson, Warren, Knox, Henry, Bureau, LaSalle, DeKalb, Kendall, Kane, DuPage, Cook

Highway system
- United States Numbered Highway System; List; Special; Divided; Illinois State Highway System; Interstate; US; State; Tollways; Scenic
← IL 33	→ IL 34
← IL 27	IL 28	→ IL 29

U.S. Route 34 (US 34) is an east–west highway in the state of Illinois that runs from the Iowa state line at Gulfport, west of Galesburg, to Illinois Route 43 (IL 43) and Historic U.S. Route 66 at Harlem Avenue in Berwyn. The entire highway in Illinois is named the Walter Payton Memorial Highway after Pro Football Hall of Famer Walter Payton, who wore #34 for the Chicago Bears. The highway is 211.37 miles (340.17 km) long within the state.

The bridge into Iowa over the Mississippi River is called the Great River Bridge. Between Monmouth and Galesburg, the highway is up to Interstate Highway standards with exits at Main Street, Henderson Street, and Seminary Street in Galesburg.

== Route description ==
=== Iowa state line to Monmouth ===
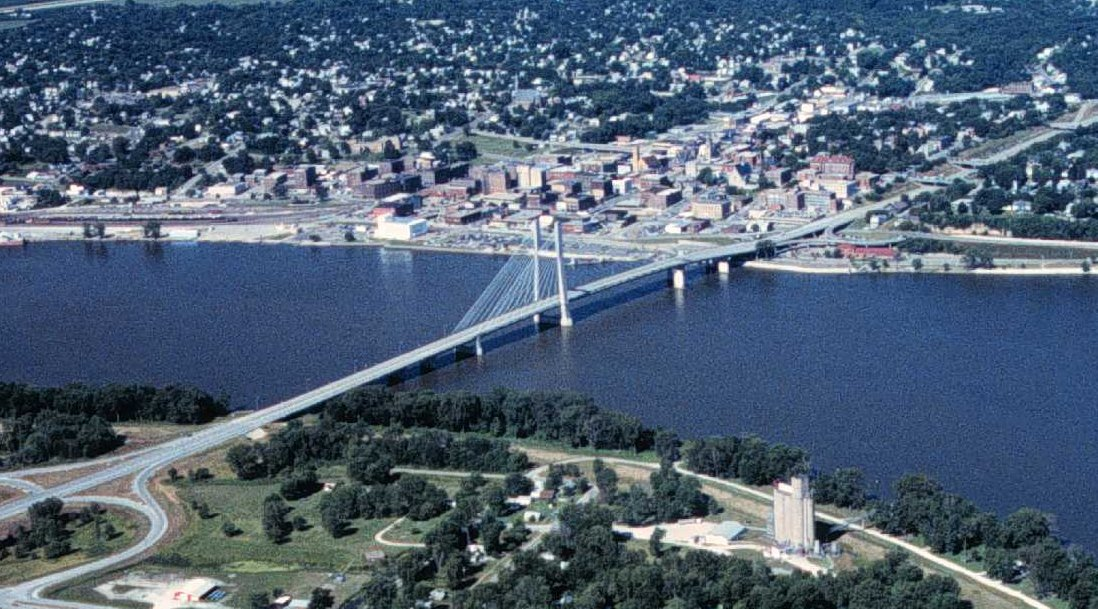
A 1997 picture of the Great River Bridge

After leaving Iowa via the Great River Bridge, US 34 enters Gulfport. In Gulfport, US 34 meets a local road at a parclo. It then travels further east, then turns into a 2-lane undivided highway, then turns northeast, and then back east again. It then meets IL 164 south of Gladstone. Just west of Biggsville, US 34 turns into a 4-lane divided bypass. After that, US 34 meets IL 94 and IL 116. East of Biggsville, it soon reverts to a 2-lane highway again. At Kirkwood, it turns north and then east again. At a 5-ramp parclo, US 34 turns north onto a 4-lane divided expressway (signed as US 67/IL 110 (CKC)). Just west of Monmouth, IL 164 runs concurrently with the other two routes. After they curve east, US 67 branches off north from the other three routes. Just northeast of Monmouth, IL 164 branches off northeast. The other two routes then become a freeway.

=== Monmouth to Kewanee ===
In the middle of Coldbrook and Cameron, the two routes meet a local road at a diamond interchange. Northeast of the Galesburg Municipal Airport, they then meet IL 164 (once again) and IL 41 at another diamond interchange where both IL 164 and IL 41 end. They then meet US 150 at a cloverleaf interchange and then another local road at a diamond interchange. At another cloverleaf interchange, IL 110 diverges north via I-74 while US 34 moves eastward (soon northeastward). At that point, the freeway ends and becomes a 2-lane road. North of Wataga, IL 167 intersects and ends at US 34. It continues northeasterly until it reaches Altona. At that point, it travels due north and then curves east. At that curve, it then runs concurrently with IL 17. IL 17 then diverges southward in Galva. US 34 then turns northeast, begins to run concurrently with IL 78, turn north, and intersect IL 91 before reaching Kewanee.

=== Kewanee to Berwyn ===
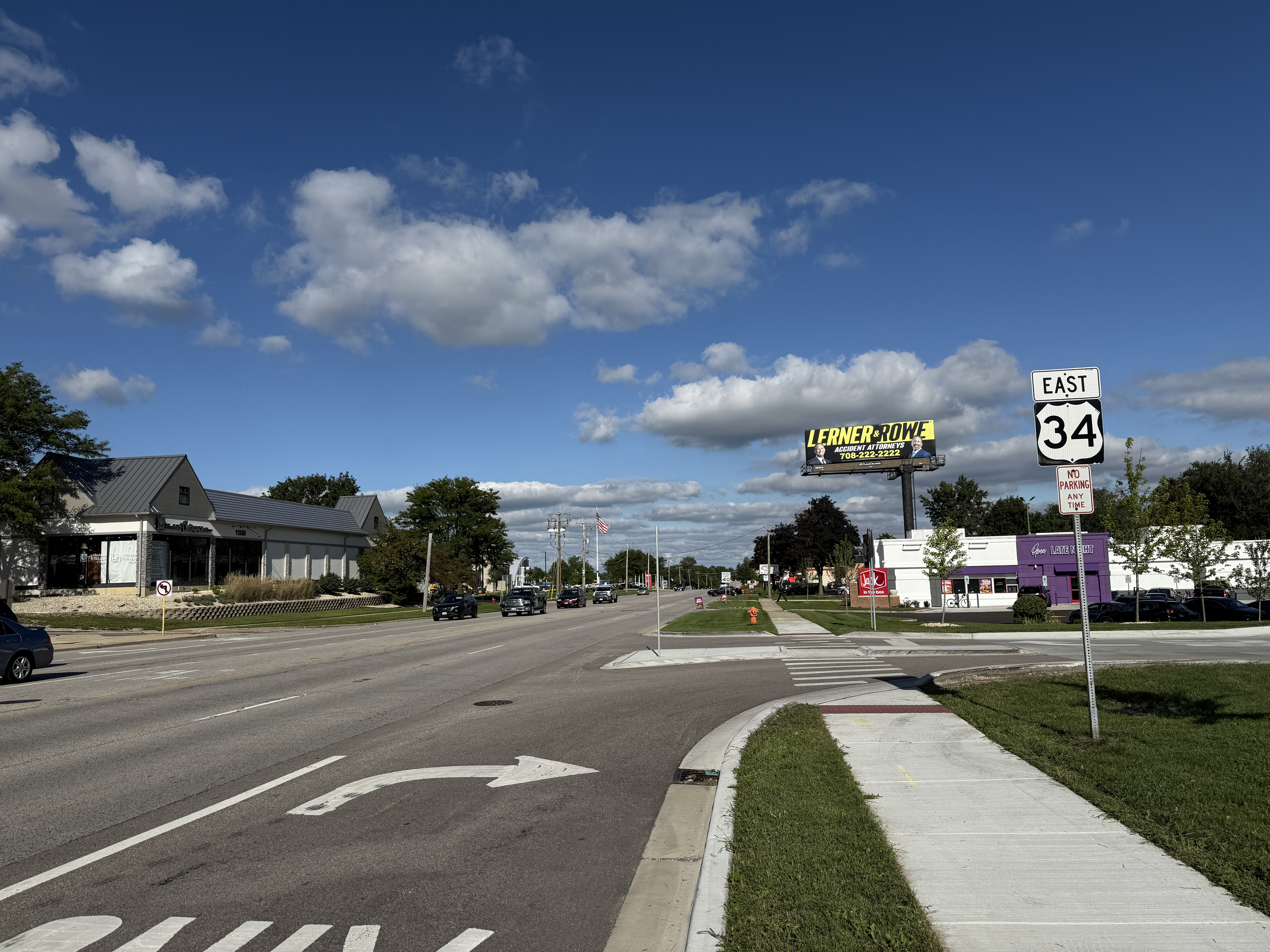
US 34 eastbound past CR 23 in Naperville

At 2nd Street in Kewanee, US 34 turns east from IL 78. Then, it turns north before reaching a railroad. At that point, it turns northeast which follows the railroad. Northeast of Neponset, it turns northward. Between Sheffield and Princeton, US 34 runs concurrently with US 6. In Princeton, it then follows IL 26 before it reaches Elm Place where US 34 branches off east (soon northeast). It then crosses under I-80, intersects IL 89, and then IL 92 in LaMoille. At the junction where US 34 intersect IL 92, it turns east. Further east, it intersects US 52/IL 251 in Mendota, then turns north, northeast, then turns back east, and then meets I-39/US 51 east of Mendota. The route continues east, swinging north and east twice before running along the southern border of Earlville and meeting IL 23 South of Leland. IL 23 runs concurrently with US 34 for about 4 miles. Then, between Leland and Somonauk, IL 23 branches off northward. Continuing east, it intersects IL 47 in Yorkville, IL 31, IL 25, and IL 71 in Oswego. Furthermore, it briefly runs concurrently with US 30 southeast of Aurora, intersects IL 59 at the city limit of Naperville, and meets IL 53 in Lisle at a 4-ramp parclo. Near the Illinois Tollway headquarters, it meets I-355, as well as I-88, at a mix of interchanges. Further east, it meets IL 83 at another 4-ramp parclo, I-294 at a cloverleaf interchange, intersects US 12/US 20/US 45 north of La Grange, and then IL 171 in Lyons before US 34 ends at IL 43 at Berwyn. At that point, the road continues on as Ogden Avenue and Historic US 66 all the way to Chicago.

== History ==
Up until 1935, Illinois Route 28 roughly followed US 34 from Galesburg to Sheffield. Also, a part of IL 8 followed part of US 34 from Burlington to Galesburg. In 1935, US 34 absorbed what had been the last remaining section of US 32 as well as IL 18, IL 28, and a portion of IL 8.

US 34 formerly overlapped US 66 all the way to its endpoint in downtown Chicago, but was truncated to its intersection with US 66 and IL 43 in Berwyn in 1970. When US 66 was subsequently eliminated, the endpoint of US 34 was left at that location—the intersection of Ogden and Harlem Avenues in Berwyn. Due to the elimination of US 66, it is one of the few U.S. Highways that ends at a state highway. With the re-signing of much of Historic US 66, the history of US 34's eastern endpoint is becoming much more clear.

== Major intersections ==
All exits are unnumbered.

County	Location	mi	km	Destinations	Notes
Mississippi River		0.00	0.00	US 34 west / Iowa 163 west – Burlington	Continuation into Iowa
Mississippi River		0.00	0.00	Great River Bridge	
Henderson	Gulfport	0.6	0.97	Gulfport	
Henderson	Gulfport	2.2	3.5	Great River Road south (Carmen Road)	West end of Great River Road overlap; east end of freeway section
Henderson	Gladstone	8.4	13.5	IL 164 east / Great River Road north – Gladstone, Oquawka	East end of Great River Road overlap
Henderson	Biggsville	11.5	18.5	IL 94 / IL 116 east – Biggsville, Stronghurst	Interchange Completed in 2014
Warren	Monmouth	25.9	41.7	US 67 south / IL 110 (CKC) west / 180th Avenue – Macomb	West end of US 67/IL 110 overlap; interchange
Warren	Monmouth	27.8	44.7	IL 164 west (Broadway) – Oquawka	West end of IL 164 overlap
Warren	Monmouth	29.3	47.2	US 67 north (Main Street) – Rock Island	East end of US 67 overlap
Warren	Monmouth	31.4	50.5	IL 164 east	East end of IL 164 overlap
Warren	Monmouth	36.2	58.3	Cameron Road	West end of freeway section
Knox	Galesburg	42.9	69.0	IL 41 south / IL 164 west (Main Street)	
Knox	Galesburg	45.7	73.5	US 150 (Henderson Street) – Alpha	
Knox	Galesburg	46.8	75.3	Seminary Street	
Knox	Galesburg	48.2	77.6	I-74 / IL 110 (CKC) east – Moline, Rock Island, Peoria	East end of IL 110 overlap; east end of freeway section; I-74 exit 46
Knox	Wataga	53.2	85.6	IL 167 east (County Road 2200 North) – Victoria	
Henry	Altona	64.8	104.3	IL 17 west (County Road 090 North) – Woodhull	West end of IL 17 overlap
Henry	Galva	70.8	113.9	IL 17 east (Center Avenue) – La Fayette, Toulon	East end of IL 17 overlap
Henry	Kewanee	77.0	123.9	IL 78 south (East 2650th North Street) – Canton	West end of IL 78 overlap
Henry	Kewanee	77.5	124.7	IL 91 east (North 200th Avenue) – Bradford	
Henry	Kewanee	82.2	132.3	IL 78 north (Main Street)	East end of IL 78 overlap
Bureau	Sheffield	96.0	154.5	US 6 west (County Road 1480 North) – Geneseo	West end of US 6 overlap
Bureau	Sheffield	99.8	160.6	IL 40 (County Road 900 East) – Rock Falls, Peoria	
Bureau	Princeton	111.4	179.3	US 6 east / IL 26 south (Peru Street)	West end of IL 26 overlap; east end of US 6 overlap
Bureau	Princeton	112.2	180.6	IL 26 north (Main Street)	East end of IL 26 overlap
Bureau	La Moille	126.7	203.9	IL 89 south (Main Street)	
Bureau	La Moille	127.7	205.5	IL 92 west	
LaSalle	Mendota	135.7	218.4	US 52 / IL 251 (13th Avenue) – Dixon, Rochelle, Peru	
LaSalle	Mendota	139.5	224.5	I-39 / US 51 – Rockford, LaSalle, Peru	I-39 exit 72
LaSalle	Leland	153.6	247.2	IL 23 south (East 18th Road) – Ottawa	West end of IL 23 overlap
LaSalle	Leland	157.7	253.8	IL 23 north (East 22nd Road) – DeKalb	East end of IL 23 overlap
DeKalb	No major junctions				
Kendall	Yorkville	174.3	280.5	IL 47 (Bridge Street)	
Kendall	Oswego	179.3	288.6	IL 31 north	
Kendall	Oswego	179.8	289.4	IL 25 north (Madison Street)	
Kendall	Oswego	180.4	290.3	IL 71 west	
Kendall	Montgomery	183.7	295.6	US 30 west	West end of US 30 overlap
Kendall	Montgomery	184.1	296.3	US 30 east (Lincoln Highway)	East end of US 30 overlap
Kane	No major junctions				
DuPage	Aurora–Naperville city line	188.7	303.7	IL 59	
DuPage	Lisle	197.1	317.2	IL 53 (Lincoln Avenue) to I-88 Toll east – Arboretum, Lombard, Joliet	Interchange
DuPage	Lisle–Downers Grove village line	198.3	319.1	I-355 Toll (Veterans Memorial Tollway) / I-88 Toll west (Ronald Reagan Memorial Tollway) / IL 110 (CKC) – Joliet, Aurora, Northwest Suburbs	I-355 exits 19 & 20B; I-88 exit 131
DuPage	Westmont–Hinsdale village line	203.9	328.1	IL 83 (Kingery Highway)	Interchange
Cook	Western Springs	205.7	331.0	I-294 Toll (Tri-State Tollway) – Wisconsin, Indiana	I-294 exit 27
Cook	La Grange	208.0	334.7	US 12 / US 20 / US 45 (La Grange Road)	
Cook	Lyons	209.9	337.8	IL 171 (1st Avenue)	
Cook	Berwyn	211.37	340.17	Historic US 66 west / IL 43 (Harlem Avenue)	National eastern terminus
Cook	Berwyn	211.37	340.17	Historic US 66 east (Ogden Avenue)	Continuation beyond IL 43
1.000 mi = 1.609 km; 1.000 km = 0.621 mi: Concurrency terminus; Tolled

U.S. Route 34
Previous state: Iowa	Illinois	Next state: Terminus
