= Illinois Route 116 =

East-west state highway in Illinois, US

Illinois Route 116
- IL 116 highlighted in red

Route information
- Maintained by IDOT
- Length: 176.07 mi (283.36 km)
- Existed: 1924–present

Major junctions
- West end: US 34 / IL 94 in Gladstone
- US 67 / IL 110 (CKC) in Roseville; US 24 / IL 29 in East Peoria; US 150 / IL 8 in East Peoria; I-74 in East Peoria; US 24 / US 150 in East Peoria; I-39 / US 51 in Benson; I-55 in Pontiac; I-57 in Ashkum
- East end: US 45 in Ashkum

Location
- Country: United States
- State: Illinois
- Counties: Henderson, Warren, Knox, Fulton, Peoria, Tazewell, Woodford, Livingston, Ford, Iroquois

Highway system
- Illinois State Highway System; Interstate; US; State; Tollways; Scenic
← IL 115	→ IL 117
← IL 123	→ IL 124

Illinois Route 116 (IL 116) is a 176.07-mile-long (283.36 km) cross-state rural state highway that runs from U.S. Route 34 (US 34) by Gladstone east to the intersection of US 45 (North Front Street) and Old US 45, on the north side of Ashkum.

== Route description ==
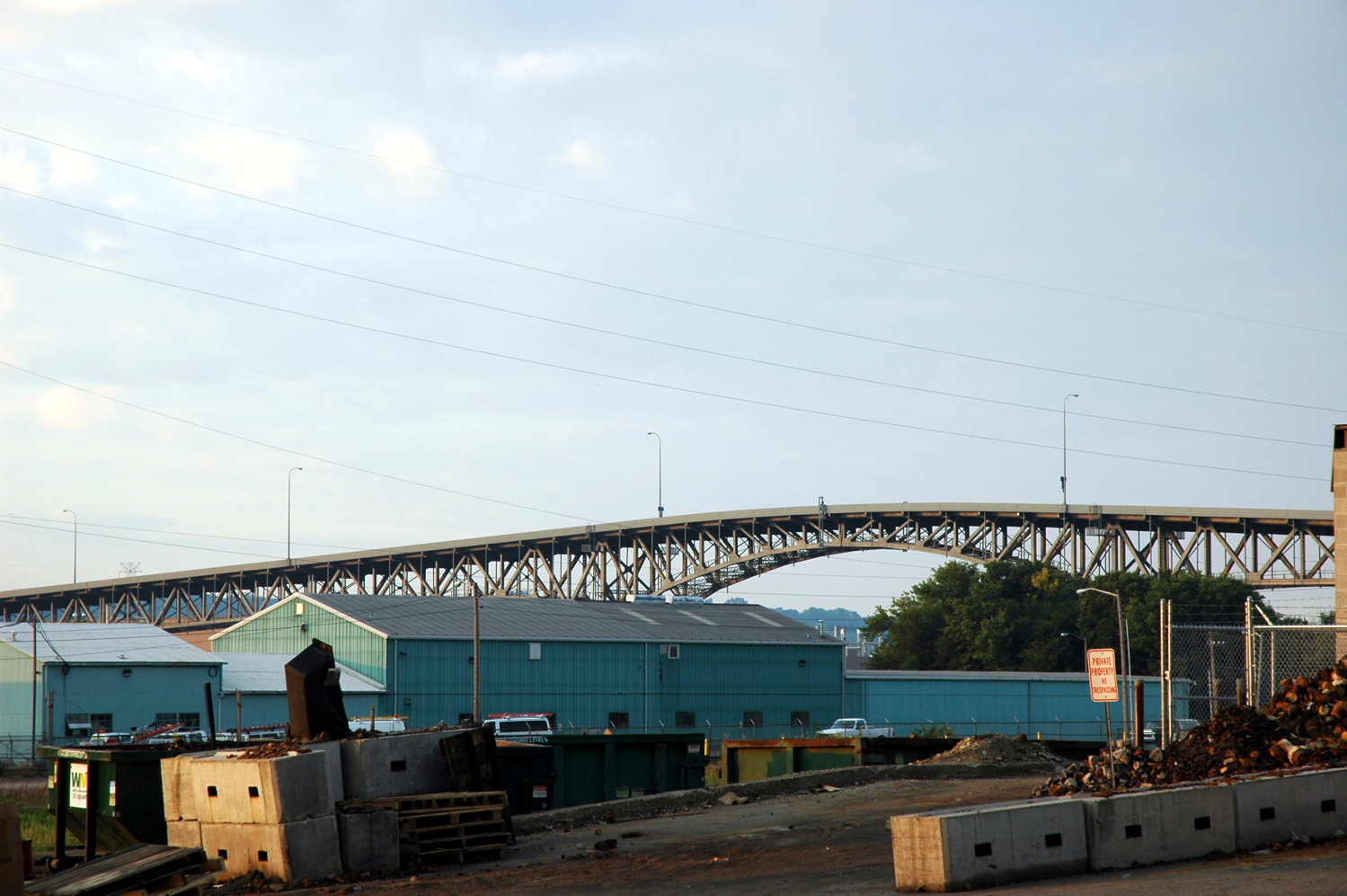
Cedar Street Bridge over the Illinois River in Peoria, Illinois

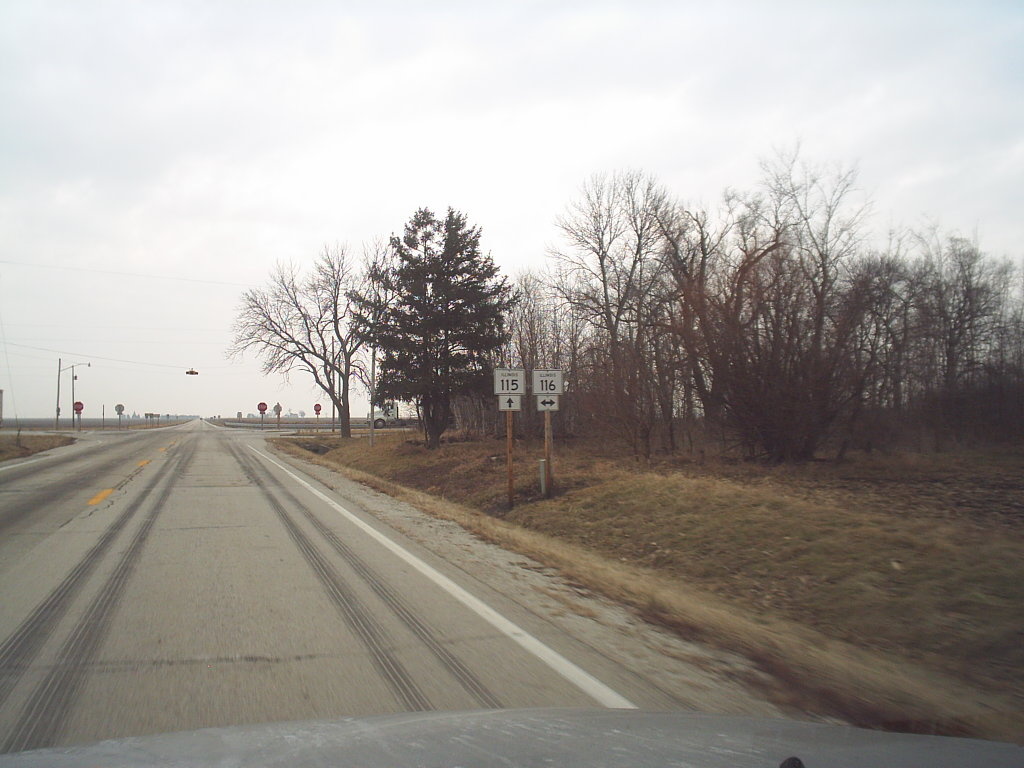
IL 116 at the intersection with IL 115

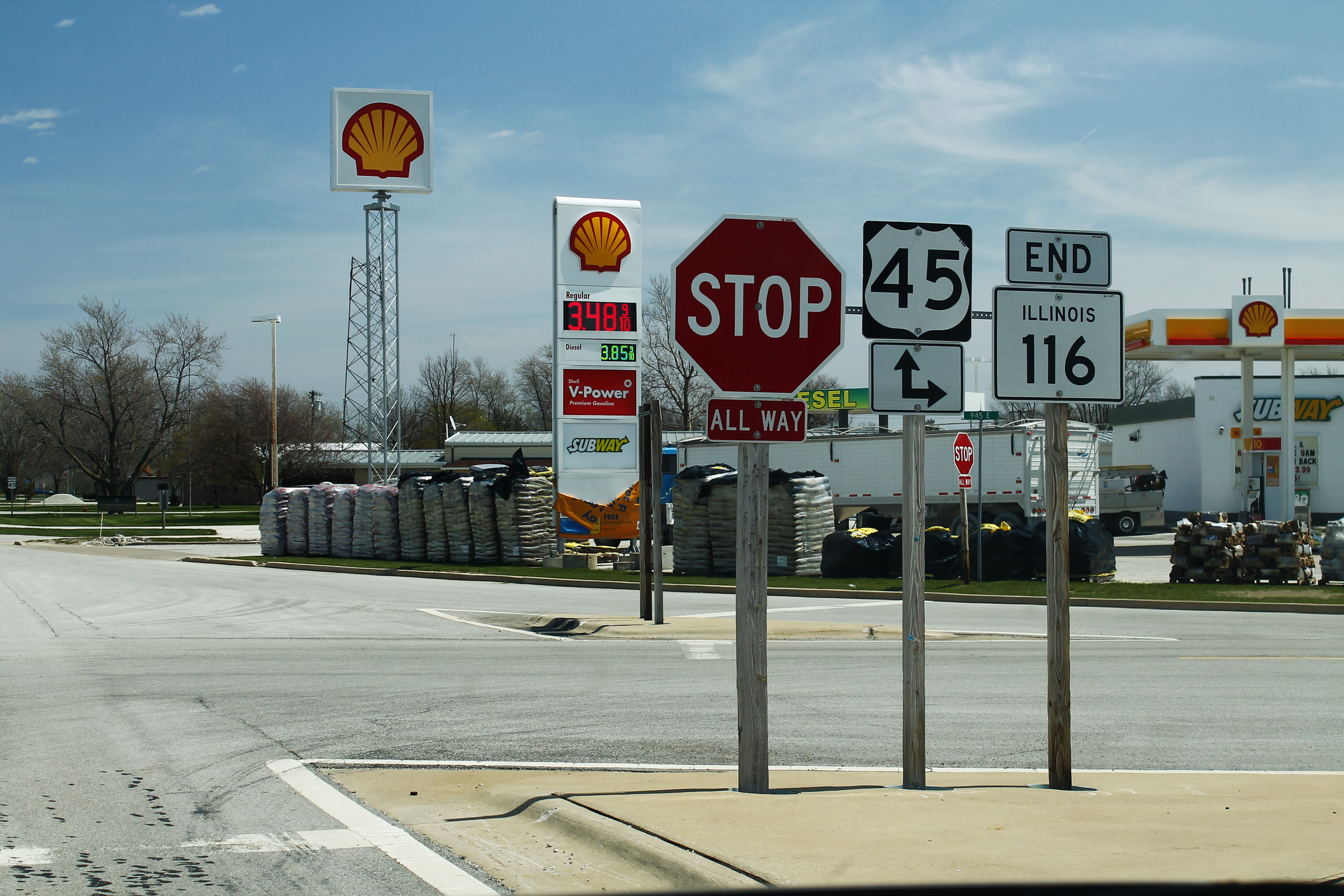
Eastern terminus in Ashkum

The western terminus of Illinois 116 is approximately 10 miles (16 km) from the Iowa state line, east of Burlington, Iowa. It crosses the Illinois River from Peoria to East Peoria with Illinois Route 8 on the Cedar Street Bridge.

On the southeast side of the Illinois River, Route 116, U.S. Route 24 and U.S. Route 150 form a wrong-way concurrency. Travelling northeast along the river, U.S. 150 is marked west before crossing the river to enter Peoria, Illinois 116 is marked east, and U.S. 24 is also marked east before branching to north of Washington. Travelling southwest, U.S. 150 is marked east before branching to Morton, Illinois 116 is marked west before crossing the river to enter Peoria on its southern side, and U.S. 24 is also marked west before continuing south with Illinois Route 29.

== History ==
=== U.S. Route 124 ===
U.S. Route 124
- Location: Peoria–Biggsville, Illinois
- Length: 80 mi (130 km)
- Existed: 1926–1938

U.S. Route 124 (US 124) was a U.S. Highway that was commissioned from 1926 to 1938, and was located in Illinois, traveling from Peoria through Biggsville. It was approximately 80 miles (130 km) in length, and followed much of the route of IL 116, prior to its decommissioning. SBI Route 116 originally traveled separately from east of Ashkum to East Peoria.

US 124 was an original 1928 US route in Illinois, since before then US routes didn't appear on Illinois maps. Its original route was from Peoria to Galesburg, along by the then IL 8, via Farmington and Maquon now on the route of IL 116, west from Peoria to IL 97, north to IL 8, west to IL 97, then northwest on IL 97 to Galesburg, then continues its last few miles on the current US 150.

In 1934, US 124 was rerouted west on the current IL 116 to near Biggsville, where it connected to US 34, for access to the Mississippi River crossing into Iowa. Westbound traffic from Peoria had a choice. Proceed along US 24 to cross the Mississippi River at Quincy (south-west route) – the old Peoria to Quincy stagecoach route, or take US 124 to cross the Mississippi River (US 34) at Burlington, Iowa (north-west route).

=== Illinois Route 116 ===
After the entirety of US 124 changed to Illinois 116 as an extension of that route in east-central Illinois. Illinois 116 was a popular agricultural and commercial truck route from Burlington, Iowa (on the Mississippi River) to Peoria, Illinois (on the Illinois River) during World War II and through the late 1960s. This was due to the: Iowa Army Ammunition Plant near Burlington; active strip mining of coal in Fulton County (largely south of the route); farm livestock traffic to the Peoria stockyards; and grain transport (corn and soybeans) to the Illinois and Mississippi barge terminals.

With the completion of Interstate 474 as a western bypass of Peoria in 1978, an Interstate connector (exit 3 on Interstate 474) was constructed as the eastern terminus for the proposed western Illinois expressway (Peoria to Kansas City via Macomb and Quincy). The connector provides access to IL 116.

== Related routes ==
=== Illinois Route 97A ===
Illinois Route 97A
- Location: Raritan–Media, Illinois
- Existed: 1929–1937

Illinois Route 97A was a short rural spur (state-maintained) that ran from IL 97 (later U.S. Route 124; now IL 116) south of Media to the community of Raritan.

IL 97A was established in 1929 as well as IL 97. It lasted until 1937 when IL 97A was decommissioned. This is because US 124 had superseded what used to be IL 97 entirely in 1935. Today, the route is signed as CR 8.

=== Illinois Route 116A ===
Illinois Route 116A
- Location: Benson–Toluca, Illinois
- Length: 13 mi (21 km)
- Existed: 1929–January 1993

Illinois Route 116A was a 13 miles (21 km) spur of IL 116 that followed what is now part of IL 117.

Initially, IL 116A used to directly connect to Benson. In 1932, the route moved slightly west. It remained like this until 1993 when IL 117 extended north to IL 17 north of Toluca, removing IL 116A in the process.

== Major intersections ==
County	Location	mi	km	Destinations	Notes
Henderson	Biggsville	0.0	0.0	US 34 (Walter Payton Memorial Highway) / IL 94 north – Monmouth, Aledo	Interchange; west end of IL 94 overlap
Henderson	Stronghurst	5.1	8.2	IL 94 south – Carthage	East end of IL 94 overlap
Warren		19.3	31.1	US 67 / IL 110 (CKC) – Macomb, Rock Island	
Warren	Roseville	20.4	32.8	US 67 Bus. (Main Street)	
Knox	St. Augustine	34.0	54.7	IL 41 – Galesburg	
Fulton	Fairview	47.5	76.4	IL 97 – Lewistown	
Fulton	Farmington	56.0	90.1	IL 78 south (South Main Street) – Canton, Havana	West end of IL 78 overlap
Fulton–Peoria county line		57.0	91.7	IL 78 north – Kewanee	East end of IL 78 overlap
Peoria	Bellevue	72.5	116.7	Maxwell Road to I-474	
Peoria	Peoria	76.4	123.0	IL 8 west (Western Avenue) – Elmwood	West end of IL 8 overlap
Illinois River		77.7	125.0	Cedar Street Bridge	
Tazewell	East Peoria	78.5	126.3	Edmund Street	Interchange
Tazewell	East Peoria	79.0	127.1	US 24 west / IL 29 south / Illinois River Road south – Quincy, Pekin, Springfield	Interchange; west end of US 24 / IL 29 / Illinois River Road overlap
Tazewell	East Peoria	79.7	128.3	US 150 east / IL 8 east (Camp Street) – Bloomington-Normal, Washington	West end of US 150 overlap; east end of IL 8 overlap
Tazewell	East Peoria	79.9	128.6	I-74 / IL 29 north – Bloomington, Peoria	Interchange; east end of IL 29 overlap
Tazewell	East Peoria	83.9	135.0	US 150 west (McClugage Bridge) / US 24 east – Peoria, Washington	Interchange; east end of US 24 / US 150 overlap
Tazewell	Germantown Hills	85.0	136.8	IL 26 north / Illinois River Road north – Princeton, Dixon	East end of Illinois River Road overlap
Woodford	Metamora	94.0	151.3	CR 23 (Douglas Street)	
Woodford	Metamora	94.8	152.6	IL 89 north (North Niles Street) – Spring Valley	
Woodford	Metamora	96.1	154.7	CR 3 south	
Woodford	Roanoke	99.4	160.0	IL 117 north / CR 1 north – Toluca	West end of IL 117 overlap
Woodford	Benson	108.7	174.9	IL 117 south / CR 18 west – Eureka	East end of IL 117 overlap
Woodford	Benson	109.7	176.5	CR 5 (Reiter Street)	
Woodford		114.2	183.8	I-39 / US 51 – Bloomington–Normal, Rockford	
Woodford		114.6	184.4	IL 251 south – El Paso	West end of IL 251 overlap
Woodford	Minonk	115.6	186.0	IL 251 north – Peru, Rochelle	East end of IL 251 overlap
Woodford		119.8	192.8	CR 20	
Livingston	Flanagan	123.8	199.2	CR 16	
Livingston	Graymont	128.8	207.3	CR 13	
Livingston	Pontiac	134.3	216.1	I-55 – Bloomington, Joliet	
Livingston	Pontiac	135.7	218.4	Historic US 66 west – Bloomington-Normal	West end of Historic US 66 overlap
Livingston	Pontiac	136.3	219.4	IL 23 north / Historic US 66 east – Ottawa, Joliet	East end of Historic US 66 overlap
Livingston	Saunemin	148.7	239.3	IL 47 – Morris, Gibson City	
Livingston		151.7	244.1	CR 23 north	
Livingston		155.5	250.3	CR 3	
Livingston	Cullom	157.5	253.5	CR 36 north (Cherry Street)	
Ford	Kempton	160.5	258.3	IL 115 – Kankakee, Piper City	
Iroquois	Ashkum	175.3	282.1	I-57 – Champaign, Kankakee	
Iroquois	Ashkum	176.07	283.36	US 45 (North Front Street) – Champaign, Kankakee	
1.000 mi = 1.609 km; 1.000 km = 0.621 mi: Concurrency terminus

== See also ==
- Illinois Route 336
