= Gladstone Township, Henderson County, Illinois =

Gladstone Township
- Township
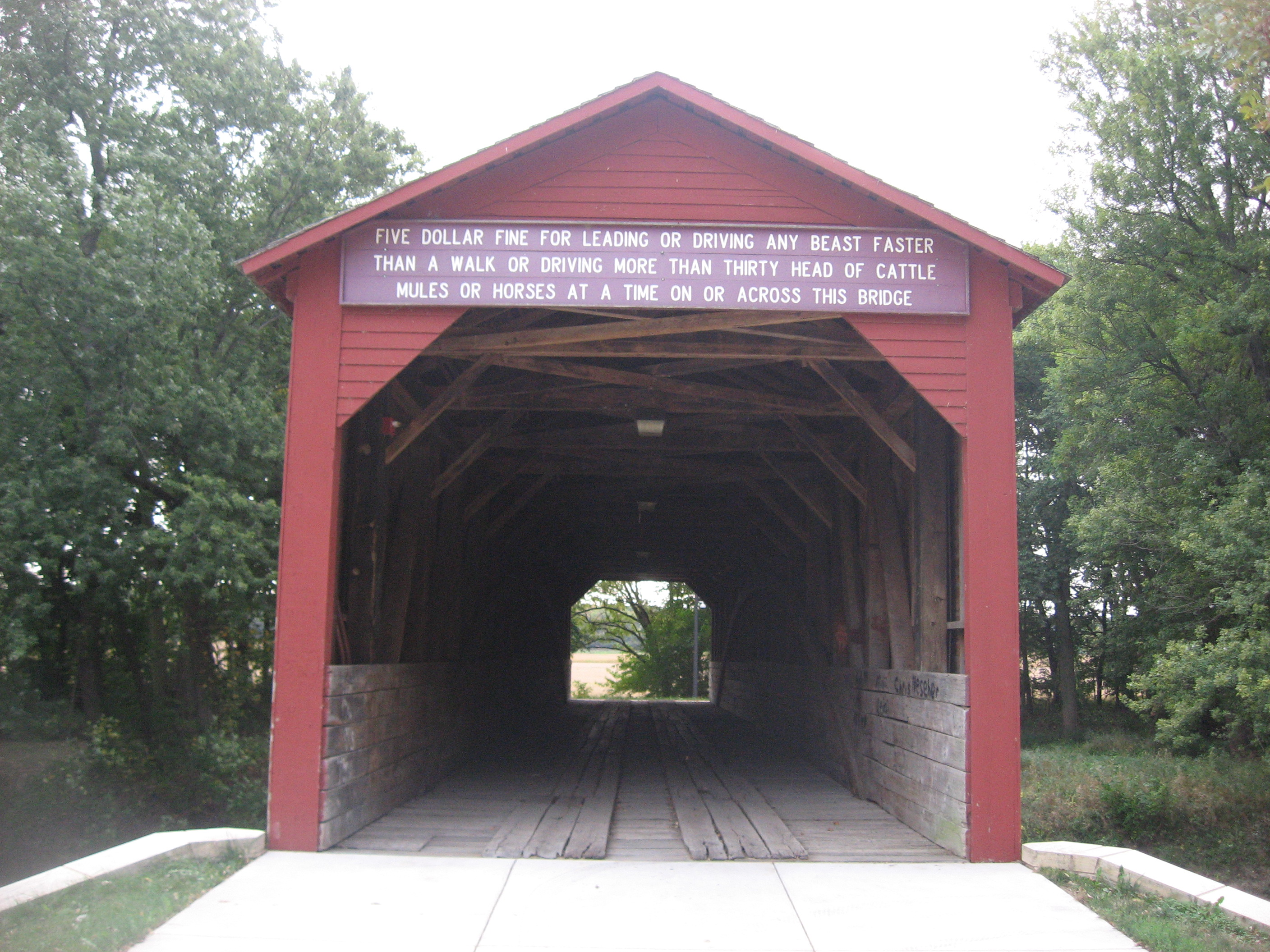
- The Oquawka Wagon Bridge, a covered bridge in the township's far north

- Location in Henderson County

- Henderson County's location in Illinois
- Coordinates: 40°50′41″N 90°58′39″W
- Country: United States
- State: Illinois
- County: Henderson
- Established: November 6, 1906

Area
  - Total: 49.14 sq mi (127.3 km^{2})
  - Land: 46.81 sq mi (121.2 km^{2})
  - Water: 2.33 sq mi (6.0 km^{2}) 4.74%
- Elevation: 548 ft (167 m)

Population (2020)
  - Total: 845
  - Density: 18.1/sq mi (6.97/km^{2})
- Time zone: UTC-6 (CST)
  - Summer (DST): UTC-5 (CDT)
- ZIP codes: 61418, 61425, 61437, 61469
- FIPS code: 17-071-29444

Gladstone Township is one of eleven townships in Henderson County, Illinois, United States. As of the 2020 census, its population was 845 and it contained 461 housing units.

== Geography ==
According to the 2021 census gazetteer files, Gladstone Township has a total area of 49.14 square miles (127.27 km^{2}), of which 46.81 square miles (121.24 km^{2}) (or 95.26%) is land and 2.33 square miles (6.03 km^{2}) (or 4.74%) is water.

=== Cities, towns, villages ===
- Gladstone
- Gulf Port (north half)

=== Unincorporated towns ===
- Lone Tree at 40.836983°N 91.018199°W

(This list is based on USGS data and may include former settlements.)

=== Cemeteries ===
The township contains these two cemeteries: Kemp and South Henderson.

=== Major highways ===
- U.S. Route 34
- Illinois Route 164

=== Lakes ===
- Crystal Lake
- Dutton Lake
- Gladstone Lake
- Pogue Lake
- Stony Point Lake

=== Landmarks ===
- Lock and Dam No. 18
- Oquawka State Wildlife Refuge

== Demographics ==
As of the 2020 census there were 845 people, 400 households, and 199 families residing in the township. The population density was 17.20 inhabitants per square mile (6.64/km^{2}). There were 461 housing units at an average density of 9.38 per square mile (3.62/km^{2}). The racial makeup of the township was 96.45% White, 0.36% African American, 0.47% Native American, 0.12% Asian, 0.00% Pacific Islander, 0.47% from other races, and 2.13% from two or more races. Hispanic or Latino of any race were 1.78% of the population.

There were 400 households, out of which 14.00% had children under the age of 18 living with them, 42.25% were married couples living together, 4.50% had a female householder with no spouse present, and 50.25% were non-families. 42.50% of all households were made up of individuals, and 21.50% had someone living alone who was 65 years of age or older. The average household size was 1.92 and the average family size was 2.68.

The township's age distribution consisted of 17.3% under the age of 18, 3.0% from 18 to 24, 19.6% from 25 to 44, 31.6% from 45 to 64, and 28.6% who were 65 years of age or older. The median age was 51.4 years. For every 100 females, there were 105.6 males. For every 100 females age 18 and over, there were 96.9 males.

The median income for a household in the township was $65,217, and the median income for a family was $75,813. Males had a median income of $52,560 versus $32,344 for females. The per capita income for the township was $34,519. About 3.0% of families and 4.0% of the population were below the poverty line, including 3.8% of those under age 18 and 1.8% of those age 65 or over.

Historical population
Census	Pop.	Note	%±
2000	1,166		—
2010	962		−17.5%
2020	845		−12.2%
U.S. Decennial Census

== School districts ==
- West Central Community Unit School District 235

== Political districts ==
- Illinois's 17th congressional district
- State House District 94
- State Senate District 47
