= Lock and Dam No. 18 =

Dam in Illinois and Iowa, U.S.

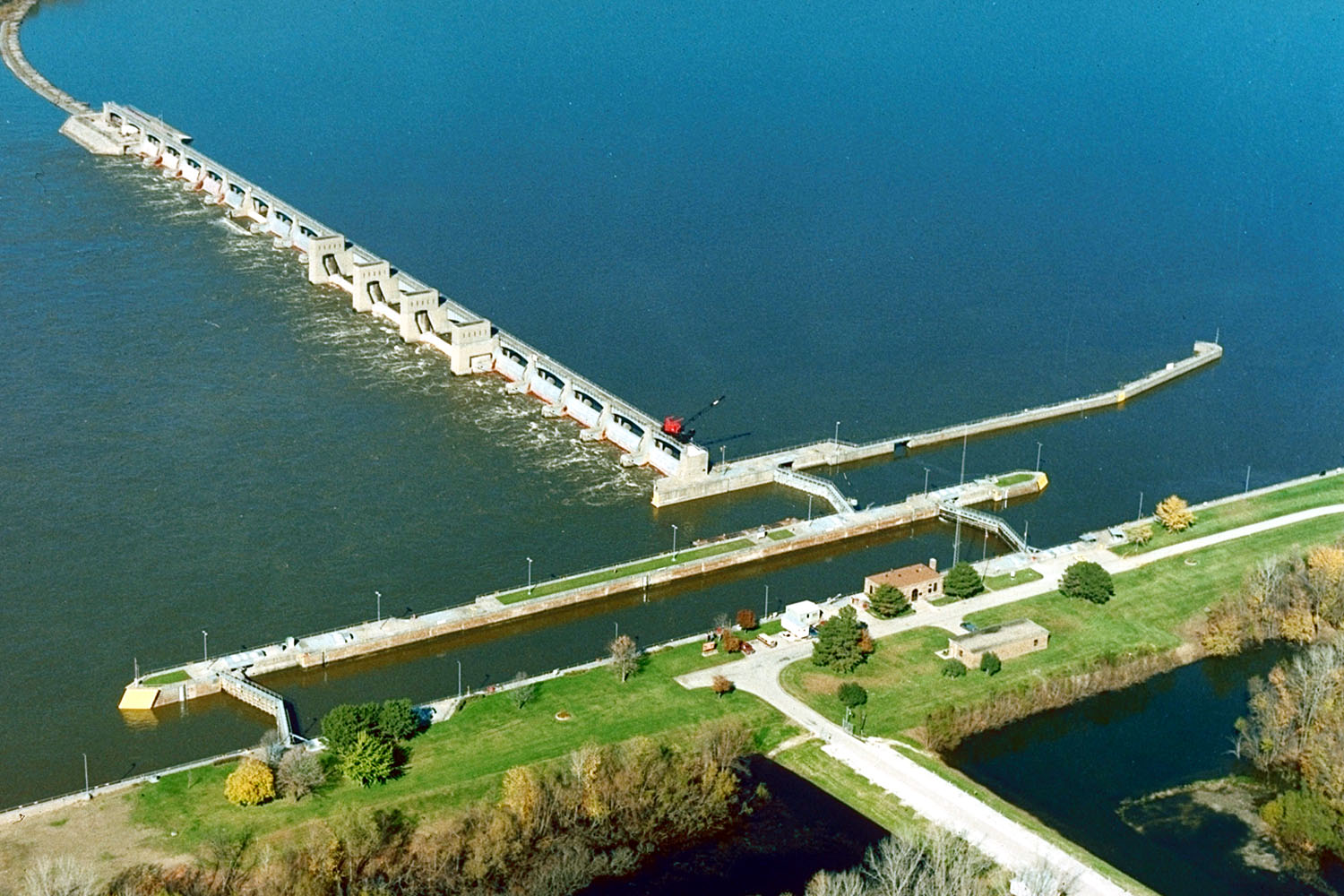
- Mississippi River Lock and Dam No. 18
- Interactive map of Lock and Dam No. 18
- Location: Tama Township, Des Moines County, Iowa / Gladstone Township, Henderson County, Illinois, near Gladstone, Illinois, USA
- Coordinates: 40°52′54″N 91°01′27″W
- Construction began: 1934
- Opening date: September 8, 1937
- Operators: U.S. Army Corps of Engineers, Rock Island District

Dam and spillways
- Impounds: Upper Mississippi River
- Length: 1,350 feet (411.5 m)

Reservoir
- Creates: Pool 18
- Total capacity: 90,000 acre⋅ft (0.11 km^{3})
- Catchment area: 113,600 mi^{2} (294,000 km^{2})
- Lock and Dam No. 18 Historic District
- U.S. National Register of Historic Places
- U.S. Historic district
- Location within Illinois Location within the United States
- Location: 1.5 mi. N of unnamed cty rd. from Gladstone, Gladstone, Illinois
- Area: 204.9 acres (82.9 ha)
- Built: 1937
- Architect: US Army Corps of Engineers; Abbott, Edwin E., Et al.
- MPS: Upper Mississippi River 9-Foot Navigation Project MPS
- NRHP reference No.: 04000178
- Added to NRHP: March 10, 2004

Lock and Dam No. 18 is a lock and dam located near Gladstone, Illinois and Burlington, Iowa on the Upper Mississippi River around river mile 410.5. The movable dam is 1,350 feet (411.5 m) and consists of 3 roller gates and 14 tainter gates. The lock is 110 feet (33.5 m) wide by 600 feet (182.9 m) long. In 2004, the facility was listed in the National Register of Historic Places as Lock and Dam No. 18 Historic District, #04000178 covering 2,049 acres (8.3 km^{2}), 1 building, 4 structures and 4 objects.

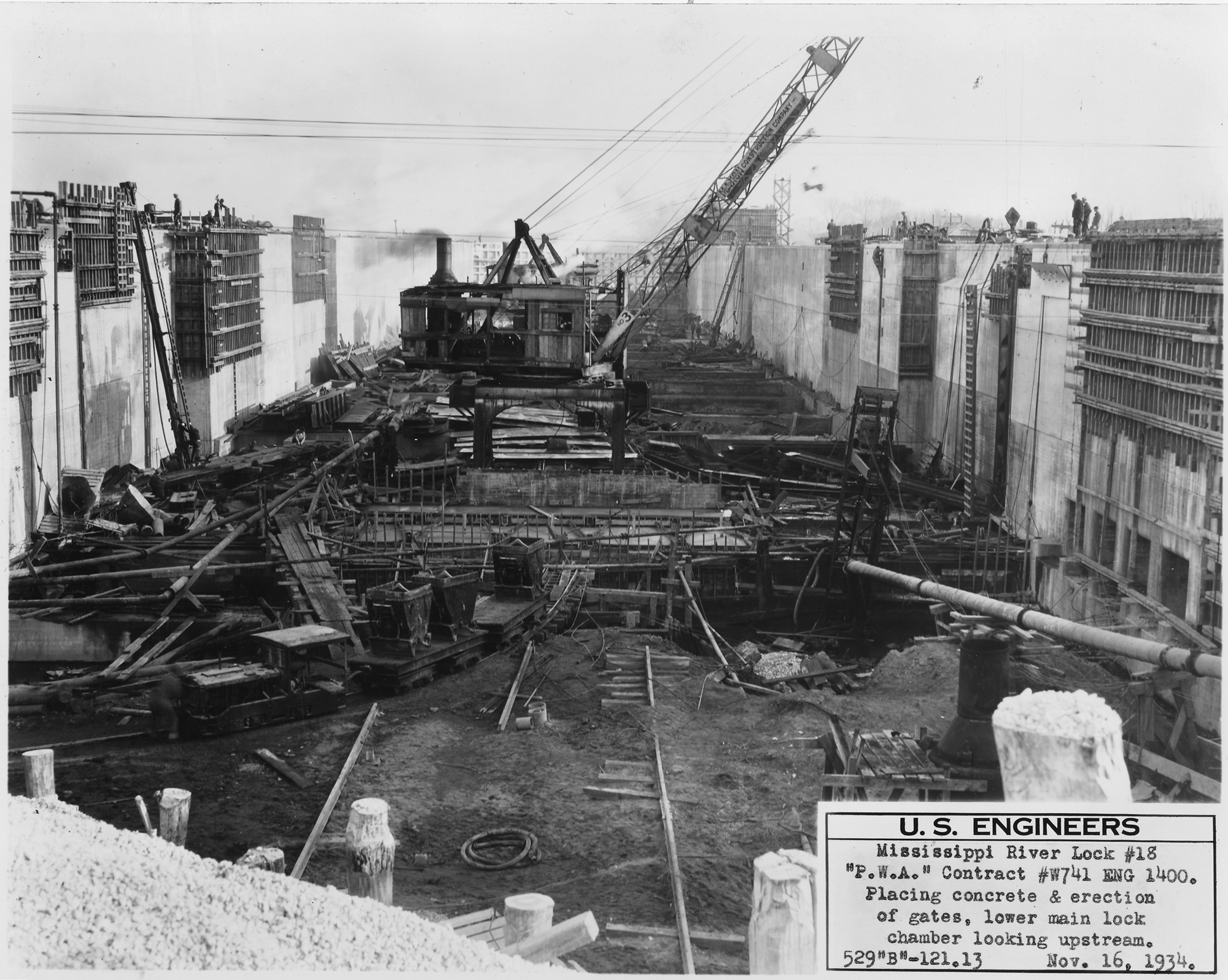
Public Works Administration Project and Army Corps of Engineers Lock and Dam No. 18 construction

== Hydroelectric plant ==
In March 2009, local officials started discussing plans to install a hydroelectric generating plant on the dam.

== See also ==
- Public Works Administration dams list
