= Biggsville Township, Henderson County, Illinois =

Biggsville Township
- Township
- Location in Henderson County

- Henderson County's location in Illinois
- Coordinates: 40°51′06″N 90°50′40″W
- Country: United States
- State: Illinois
- County: Henderson
- Established: November 6, 1906

Area
  - Total: 36.70 sq mi (95.1 km^{2})
  - Land: 36.64 sq mi (94.9 km^{2})
  - Water: 0.06 sq mi (0.16 km^{2}) 0.16%
- Elevation: 682 ft (208 m)

Population (2020)
  - Total: 514
  - Density: 14.0/sq mi (5.42/km^{2})
- Time zone: UTC-6 (CST)
  - Summer (DST): UTC-5 (CDT)
- ZIP codes: 61418, 61437, 61447
- FIPS code: 17-071-05911

Biggsville Township is one of eleven townships in Henderson County, Illinois, USA. As of the 2020 census, its population was 514 and it contained 265 housing units.

== Geography ==
According to the 2021 census gazetteer files, Biggsville Township has a total area of 36.70 square miles (95.05 km^{2}), of which 36.64 square miles (94.90 km^{2}) (or 99.84%) is land and 0.06 square miles (0.16 km^{2}) (or 0.16%) is water.

=== Cities, towns, villages ===
- Biggsville

=== Cemeteries ===
The township contains these four cemeteries: Biggsville, Cumberland Presbyterian, Huss and Salter's Grove.

=== Major highways ===
- U.S. Route 34
- Illinois Route 94

=== Airports and landing strips ===
- Corzatt Airport
- Seymour Landing Strip

== Demographics ==
As of the 2020 census there were 514 people, 295 households, and 208 families residing in the township. The population density was 14.00 inhabitants per square mile (5.41/km^{2}). There were 265 housing units at an average density of 7.22 per square mile (2.79/km^{2}). The racial makeup of the township was 96.30% White, 0.58% African American, 0.58% Native American, 0.19% Asian, 0.00% Pacific Islander, 0.19% from other races, and 2.14% from two or more races. Hispanic or Latino of any race were 1.95% of the population.

There were 295 households, out of which 23.40% had children under the age of 18 living with them, 61.36% were married couples living together, 5.08% had a female householder with no spouse present, and 29.49% were non-families. 25.80% of all households were made up of individuals, and 12.90% had someone living alone who was 65 years of age or older. The average household size was 2.11 and the average family size was 2.39.

The township's age distribution consisted of 14.1% under the age of 18, 9.1% from 18 to 24, 25.8% from 25 to 44, 27.6% from 45 to 64, and 23.3% who were 65 years of age or older. The median age was 45.9 years. For every 100 females, there were 109.1 males. For every 100 females age 18 and over, there were 114.0 males.

The median income for a household in the township was $90,074, and the median income for a family was $91,618. Males had a median income of $80,048 versus $21,500 for females. The per capita income for the township was $64,366. About 3.8% of families and 7.5% of the population were below the poverty line, including 1.1% of those under age 18 and 7.6% of those age 65 or over.

Historical population
Census	Pop.	Note	%±
2000	568		—
2010	552		−2.8%
2020	514		−6.9%
U.S. Decennial Census

== School districts ==
- West Central Community Unit School District 235

== Political districts ==
- Illinois's 17th congressional district
- State House District 94
- State Senate District 47
