= La Harpe City Hall =

- U.S. National Register of Historic Places
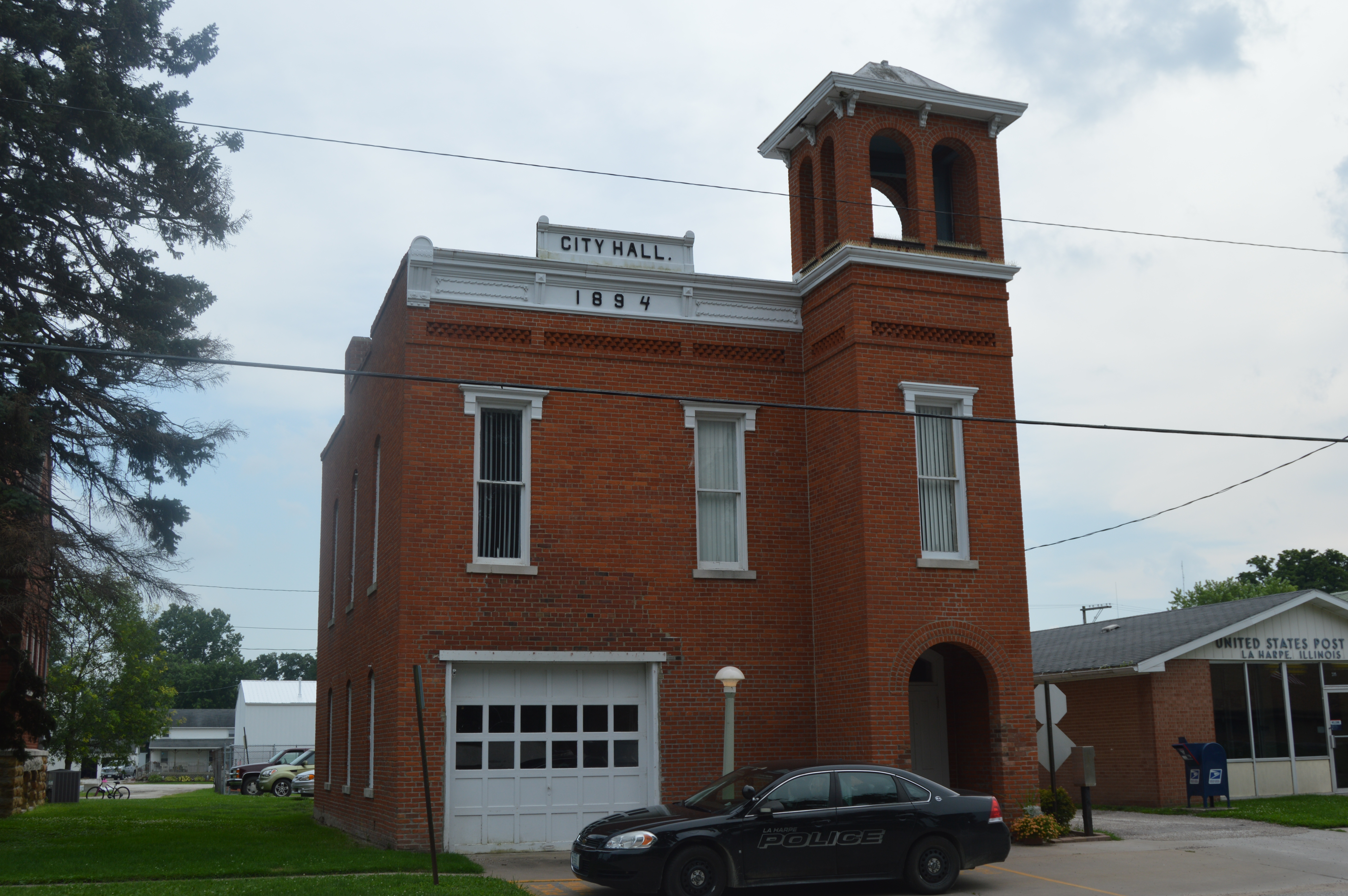

- Location within Illinois Location within the United States
- Location: 207 E. Main St., LaHarpe, Illinois
- Coordinates: 40°35′0″N 90°58′2″W
- Area: less than one acre
- Built: 1894
- Built by: Hillier, A.J.
- NRHP reference No.: 91001689
- Added to NRHP: November 14, 1991

The La Harpe City Hall, located at 207 East Main Street, is the historic city hall serving La Harpe, Illinois. Built in 1894, it housed City Council meetings as well as the town's police and fire departments. As the city had undergone significant commercial growth in the late 19th century, the city council was busy discussing and voting on infrastructure to support a larger city. In addition to giving itself a permanent meeting place in the city hall, the council approved a water works in response to a major fire in 1893 and included a jail in the city hall to aid the police department. After settling in its new city hall, the city council continued to develop the community by funding an electric power plant, supporting a public library, and aiding in efforts to pave Main Street.

The city hall was added to the National Register of Historic Places on November 14, 1991.
