= St. Augustine, Illinois =

- Village
- Location of St. Augustine in Knox County, Illinois
- Coordinates: 40°43′17″N 90°24′25″W
- Country: United States
- State: Illinois
- County: Knox
- Township: Indian Point

Area
  - Total: 0.59 sq mi (1.54 km^{2})
  - Land: 0.59 sq mi (1.54 km^{2})
  - Water: 0 sq mi (0.00 km^{2})
- Elevation: 643 ft (196 m)

Population (2020)
  - Total: 119
  - Density: 200.6/sq mi (77.46/km^{2})
- Time zone: UTC-6 (CST)
  - Summer (DST): UTC-5 (CDT)
- ZIP code: 61474
- Area code: 309
- FIPS code: 17-66677
- GNIS feature ID: 2399158

St. Augustine or Saint Augustine is a village in Knox County, Illinois, United States. The population was 119 at the 2020 census. It is part of the Galesburg Micropolitan Statistical Area.

== Geography ==
St. Augustine is located in the southwest corner of Knox County. The southern boundary of the village follows the Fulton county line. Illinois Route 41 passes through the center of the village, leading north 6 miles (10 km) to Abingdon and 17 miles (27 km) to Galesburg, the county seat. To the south IL 41 leads 14 miles (23 km) to Bushnell. Illinois Route 116 follows the northern border of the village, leading east 8 miles (13 km) to London Mills and west 13 miles (21 km) to Roseville.

According to the 2021 census gazetteer files, St. Augustine has a total area of 0.59 square miles (1.53 km^{2}), all land.

== Demographics ==
Historical population
Census	Pop.	Note	%±
1880	289		—
1890	255		−11.8%
1900	229		−10.2%
1910	187		−18.3%
1920	195		4.3%
1930	158		−19.0%
1940	182		15.2%
1950	198		8.8%
1960	201		1.5%
1970	204		1.5%
1980	204		0.0%
1990	151		−26.0%
2000	152		0.7%
2010	120		−21.1%
2020	119		−0.8%
U.S. Decennial Census

As of the 2020 census there were 119 people, 59 households, and 34 families residing in the village. The population density was 200.67 inhabitants per square mile (77.48/km^{2}). There were 65 housing units at an average density of 109.61 per square mile (42.32/km^{2}). The racial makeup of the village was 94.12% White, 0.00% African American, 0.00% Native American, 0.00% Asian, 0.00% Pacific Islander, 1.68% from other races, and 4.20% from two or more races. Hispanic or Latino of any race were 1.68% of the population.

There were 59 households, out of which 18.6% had children under the age of 18 living with them, 40.68% were married couples living together, 16.95% had a female householder with no husband present, and 42.37% were non-families. 33.90% of all households were made up of individuals, and 15.25% had someone living alone who was 65 years of age or older. The average household size was 3.00 and the average family size was 2.25.

The village's age distribution consisted of 18.8% under the age of 18, 8.3% from 18 to 24, 15.8% from 25 to 44, 42.2% from 45 to 64, and 15.0% who were 65 years of age or older. The median age was 52.2 years. For every 100 females, there were 95.6 males. For every 100 females age 18 and over, there were 96.4 males.

The median income for a household in the village was $44,375, and the median income for a family was $49,583. Males had a median income of $30,625 versus $20,909 for females. The per capita income for the village was $21,198. About 14.7% of families and 17.3% of the population were below the poverty line, including 12.0% of those under age 18 and 0.0% of those age 65 or over.
