= May Gearhart =

American printmaker

May Gearhart (April 22, 1872 – August 14, 1951) was an American printmaker who was part of an early 20th century circle of Southern California printmakers strongly influenced by the Arts and Crafts movement and Japanese art.

== Education and teaching ==
May Gearhart was born in Sagetown, Illinois, in 1872. Her older sister Frances became a noted printmaker and watercolorist; another sister, Edna, was also an artist.

The family moved to California in the 1880s, and Gearhart was educated at the State Normal School at Los Angeles and then at the School of the Art Institute of Chicago, where one of her teachers was Rudolph Schaeffer.

May gained further art training intermittently throughout her life. She learned block printing from the printmaker Arthur Wesley Dow at the Ipswich Summer School of Art in Massachusetts. She learned etching from Benjamin Brown, who lived near her in Pasadena and was a cofounder of the Print Makers of Los Angeles (which later merged with the Print Makers Society of California, PMSC). In 1930 she studied with the painter Hans Hofmann.

May supported herself as an educator, starting out in 1900 as a teacher in the Berkeley (California) public schools. In 1903, she became supervisor of art for the entire Los Angeles city school system, a position she held until 1939. In 1919 she moved to Pasadena to live with Frances, where their house became a headquarters for local printmakers.

== Art ==
Gearhart worked mainly in soft-ground color etching but also made block prints. She favored landscapes and genre scenes whose simplified forms, stylized drawing, and subtle colors and textures were influenced by the Arts and Crafts movement, Japanese art, and Arthur Wesley Dow's aesthetic. Some of her work appeared on the cover of magazines like California Life (1922).

In 1924, she and Frances had a two-person exhibition at the Los Angeles County Museum of Art. Gearhart also took part in exhibitions held by the PMSC, the Chicago Society of Etchers, the Pacific Art Association, and the Society of American Etchers.

In the late 1920s, Gearhart and her two sisters collaborated on a children's book of original verse illustrated with their linocut prints. Entitled Let's Play, it was not published until 2009, when it was brought out by the Book Club of California. The original manuscript is in the Cotsen Children's Library at Princeton University.

In 1939, she published the illustrated book Sketches of a Late Etcher, describing the ordeal of an artist who is late for a publication deadline.

She died in 1951 in Altadena, California. Gearhart's work is in the collections of the Los Angeles County Museum, the San Francisco Museum of Fine Art, the Smithsonian Institution, the Spencer Museum of Art, and the Achenbach Foundation.
