= Illinois Route 95 =

Highway in IllinoiEast-west state highway in Illinois, US

Illinois Route 95
- IL 95 highlighted in red

Route information
- Maintained by IDOT
- Length: 17.12 mi (27.55 km)
- Existed: November 5, 1918–present

Major junctions
- West end: IL 41 in Bardolph
- East end: IL 97 in Cuba

Location
- Country: United States
- State: Illinois
- Counties: McDonough, Fulton

Highway system
- Illinois State Highway System; Interstate; US; State; Tollways; Scenic
← IL 94	→ IL 96

Illinois Route 95 is a minor east–west state route in west central Illinois. It runs from Illinois Route 41 just west of New Philadelphia east to Illinois Route 97 just south of Cuba. This is a distance of 17.12 miles (27.55 km).

== Route description ==
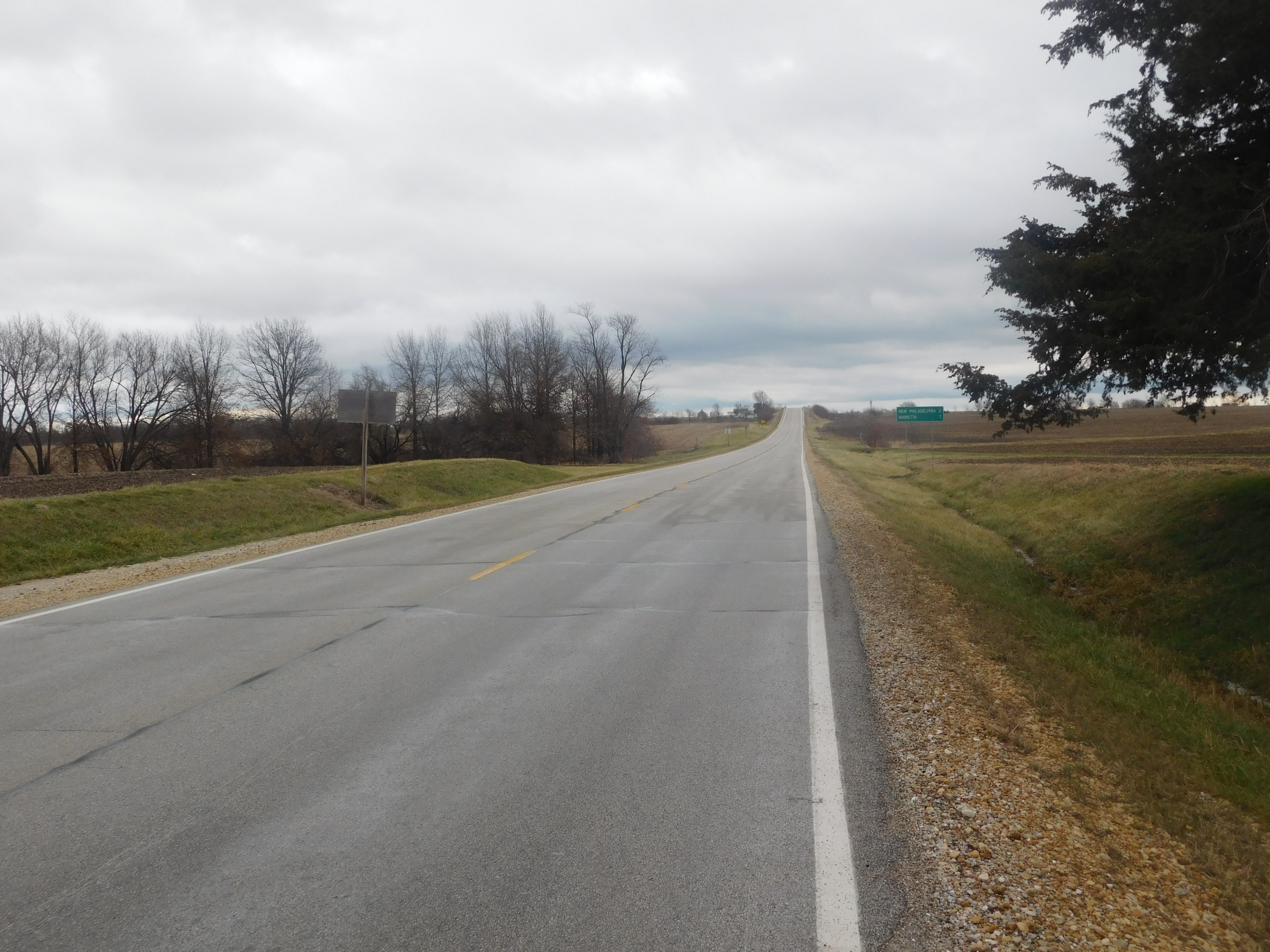
IL 95 heading east of IL 41

Illinois 95 makes up part of direct highway between Macomb and Canton without touching either. It is an undivided, two-lane surface state route for its entire length. At its eastern terminus, Illinois 95 and Illinois 97 form a Y-intersection.

== History ==
SBI Route 95 ran from Niota (at the Mississippi River by Fort Madison, Iowa) to U.S. Route 24 at Illinois Route 78 via Illinois Route 9, Illinois 41, Illinois 95, Illinois 97, and U.S. 24. In March 1937 this was changed to its modern alignment.

The future route for Illinois Route 336 between Macomb and Peoria will likely parallel or replace IL Route 95.

== Major intersections ==
County	Location	mi	km	Destinations	Notes
McDonough	Bardolph	0.00	0.00	IL 41	
Fulton	Cuba	17.12	27.55	IL 97 – Cuba, Lewistown	
1.000 mi = 1.609 km; 1.000 km = 0.621 mi
