= Illinois Route 41 =

North-south state highway in Illinois, US

Illinois Route 41
- IL 41 highlighted in red

Route information
- Maintained by IDOT
- Length: 37.53 mi (60.40 km)
- Existed: November 5, 1918–present

Major junctions
- South end: US 136 in Adair
- North end: US 34 / IL 110 (CKC) / IL 164 in Galesburg

Location
- Country: United States
- State: Illinois
- Counties: McDonough, Fulton, Knox

Highway system
- Illinois State Highway System; Interstate; US; State; Tollways; Scenic
← US 41	→ IL 42

Illinois Route 41 (IL 41) is a north–south route in rural west-central Illinois. It runs from U.S. Route 136 near Macomb north to U.S. Route 34 and Illinois Route 164 in Galesburg, a distance of 37.53 miles (60.40 km). Illinois 41 is maintained by the Illinois Department of Transportation.

== Route description ==
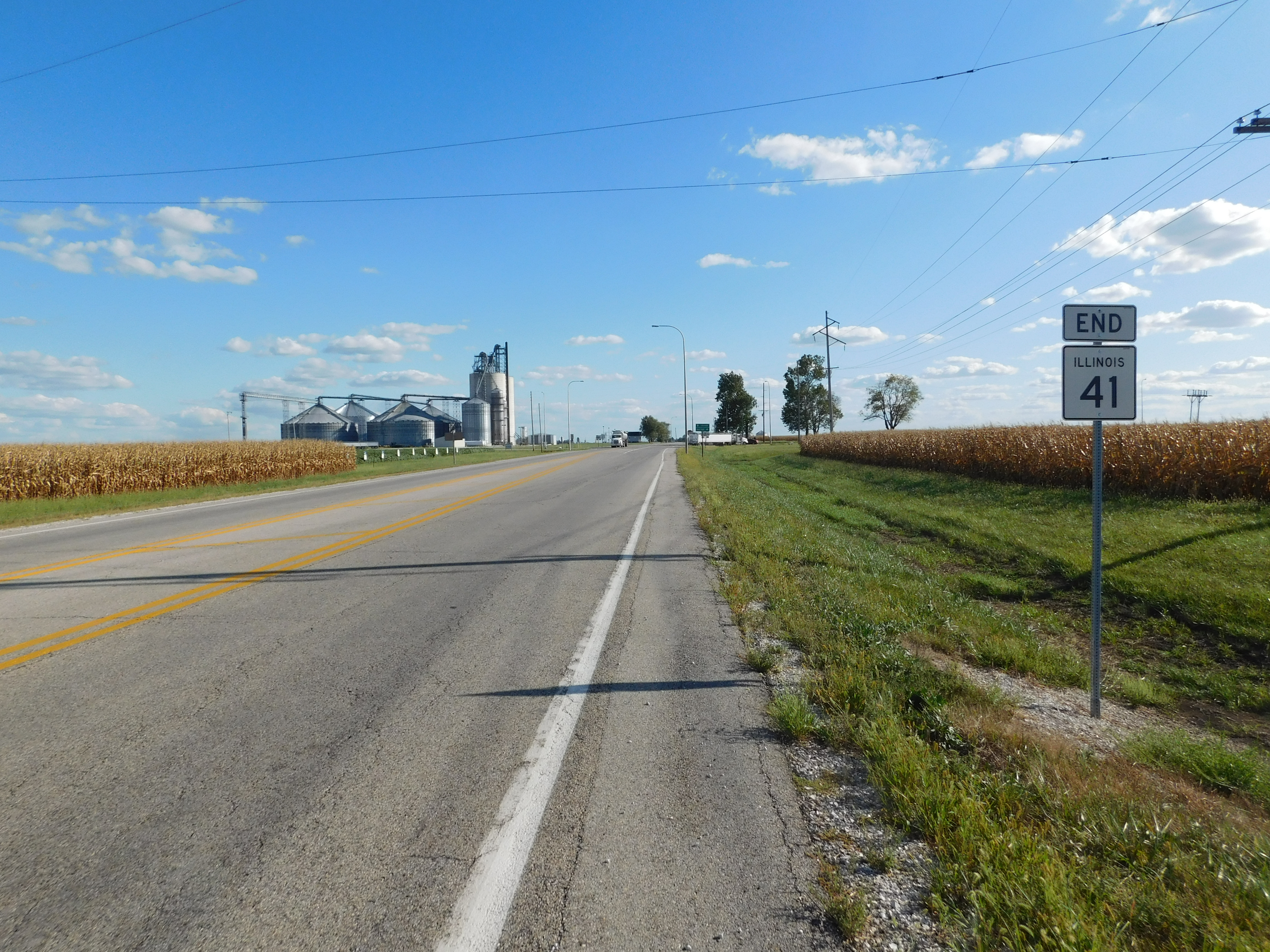
IL 41 south approaching US 136

Illinois 41 begins at a junction with U.S. Route 136 in eastern McDonough County, east of Macomb and north of Adair. The route heads north and intersects Illinois 95 east of Bardolph. Illinois 41 continues north to Bushnell, where it becomes concurrent with Illinois 9. The two highways run northeast until Illinois 41 splits off of Illinois 9 and heads north into Prairie City. The highway leaves Prairie City to the east and enters Fulton County. In Fulton County, Illinois 41 heads north and passes through Avon before entering Knox County. The highway enters St. Augustine in southern Knox County, intersecting Illinois 116 along the village's northern edge. Illinois 41 continues north through Abingdon before entering western Galesburg, where it terminates at a junction with U.S. Route 34 and Illinois 164.

Illinois 41 closely follows the Quincy Line south of Galesburg of the Chicago, Burlington and Quincy Railroad to the Bushnell wye (Quincy–Hannibal line and Beardstown–Paducah line). Four daily Amtrak trains travel this rail line section.

== History ==
Illinois 41 is exactly the same route as SBI Route 41, as instituted in 1918. There have been only minor routing changes, largely at its northern terminus in Galesburg, since its inception. This route parallels the CB&Q railroad from Galesburg to its southern terminus at U.S. 136. This route crosses over the CB&Q right-of-way (Galesburg to Beardstown) twice along its 38-mile (61 km) distance.

The southern terminus in McDonough County at U.S. Route 136 is referred to (locally) as the Nine-Mile Y. The Y in reference to an interchange road architecture historically used on Illinois state routes. While a few of these still remain throughout the state, most of these Y intersections have been replaced with the safer T-style intersections and stop signs.

=== Galesburg alignment change ===
IL-41 enters Galesburg from the south on Linwood Road. The historic alignment turned northeast on Monmouth Blvd. through an industrial section between the former Santa Fe mainline to the north and the former CB&Q connector to the south. At South Henderson, the historic route turned north, crossing the old Santa Fe mainline and terminating at West Main Street U.S. 150 and Illinois Route 164. This alignment moved west with the completion of U.S. 34 as a four-lane expressway to Monmouth. IL-41 now proceeds north on an upgraded and wider Linwood Road to West Main Street Illinois Route 164 where it terminates at the nearby access interchange for U.S. 34.

== Major intersections ==
County	Location	mi	km	Destinations	Notes
McDonough		0.0	0.0	US 136	
McDonough		2.6	4.2	IL 95 east	
McDonough	Bushnell	6.3	10.1	IL 9 west (Ludwig Street)	Southern end of IL 9 concurrency
McDonough		10.3	16.6	IL 9 east	Northern end of IL 9 concurrency
Fulton	No major junctions				
Knox	St. Augustine	22.0	35.4	IL 116	
Knox	Galesburg	37.53	60.40	US 34 / IL 110 (CKC) – Monmouth, Kewanee IL 164 west	Interchange; IL 164 continues west
1.000 mi = 1.609 km; 1.000 km = 0.621 mi: Concurrency terminus
