= Frances Gearhart =

American painter

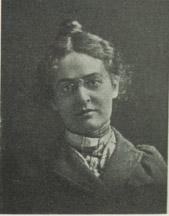
- Frances Gearhart, 1900
- Born: Frances Hammell Gearhart; January 4, 1869; Sagetown, Illinois, United States
- Died: April 4, 1958 (aged 89); Pasadena, California, United States
- Education: State Normal School at Los Angeles (1891)
- Known for: Printmaking; Watercolor
- Website: www.francesgearhart.com

Frances Gearhart (January 4, 1869 – April 4, 1959) was an American printmaker and watercolorist known for her boldly drawn and colored woodcut and linocut prints of American landscapes. Focused especially on California's coasts and mountains, this body of work has been called "a vibrant celebration of the western landscape." She is one of the most important American color block print artists of the early 20th century.

== Early years and education ==
Frances Hammell Gearhart was born January 4, 1869, in Sagetown, Illinois. She moved to California in 1888 and began studying at the State Normal School at Los Angeles (now UCLA) the following year. She graduated in 1891 and thereafter supported herself for several years teaching English at the high school level. At some point, she received further training in art from Charles Herbert Woodbury and Henry Rankin Poore. She may also have taken a class from Frank Morley Fletcher, who was instrumental in bringing Japanese woodblock techniques to Europe and America.

== Art career ==
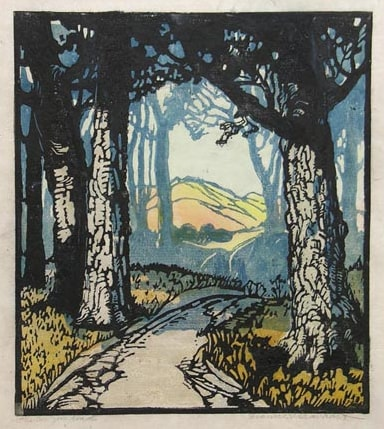
The Canyon Road, 1920

In one of her earliest public displays in Los Angeles, which was a joint exhibit in 1909 with other high school teachers, Frances contributed a collection of "striking water color scenes". At her first one-person exhibition in March 1911 at the Walker Theatre Gallery the Los Angeles Times art critic Antony Anderson described her 35 watercolor landscapes as being "full of movement". Even at this early stage, critics noted her as a colorist who promised to develop into "one of the strongest of California's landscape painters." She continued exhibiting watercolors for several years before moving into printmaking—especially linocuts and woodcuts—which would become her preferred medium.

Gearhart was taught block printing by her sisters May and Edna, also artists, who had learned it from Arthur Wesley Dow at the Ipswich Summer School of Art in Massachusetts. She worked in a traditional Japanese relief-printing method, creating a separate block for each color in the final print, with individual prints requiring up to 8 separate blocks. It is estimated that she created some 250 different prints altogether in editions of 20–50, each of which was printed by hand.

Influenced by the Arts and Crafts movement, Gearhart made prints that featured strong use of inky black or dark blue lines together with rich foreground colors set off against muted deep backgrounds. She frequently included paths, roads, and waterways to lead the viewer into the image and made use of sentinel trees to anchor her compositions. The fusion of stark lines with atmospheric color and light in her images makes her style singularly well suited to depict California's unique combination of "serene and stark beauty."

She became an exhibiting member of the San Francisco-based California Society of Etchers (today's California Society of Printmakers) and for the Society's Eighth Annual Exhibition of 1919 she had five of her color prints accepted by the jury for display.

Gearhart became a member of the Print Makers Society of California (PMSC) in 1919 and was one of the organization's leaders during its formative years. In 1920, she was commissioned to make the first of what became the PMSC's annual series of gift prints. The PMSC exhibitions, which habitually began in Los Angeles, often traveled to northern California. Between 1921 and 1942 the Bay Area press specifically mentioned her work at venues that included the: Oakland Art Gallery, Casa de Maňana Gallery of Berkeley, San Francisco Museum of Art, Print Rooms of San Francisco, Stanford University Art Gallery, and Carmel's Arts & Crafts Club. Frances frequently summered and sketched on the Monterey Peninsula and at the Carmel Annual in 1921 five of her block prints attracted much attention.

She later joined the Prairie Print Makers and the American Federation of the Arts as well.

By 1923, Gearhart was able to leave teaching and devote herself full-time to art. She and her sisters May and Enda set up an art gallery in Pasadena, CA, where they curated exhibitions for the PMSC and for leading European printmakers.

Frances and May held a joint exhibition of color etchings and woodblock prints in October 1922 at the Chouinard Art Institute in Los Angeles. In the fall of 1923, the sisters created an expanded version of this exhibit for the Los Angeles Museum. This was followed by participation in exhibitions at other museums, including the Brooklyn Museum, the Toronto Museum, and the Worcester Art Museum. Her work is in the collection of numerous museums and art institutions.

In June 1926 Frances lectured and staged a solo show of her linoleum block prints at the UCLA Art Gallery. The following month for the Paris exhibition of graphic arts in the Bibliothèque nationale de France she sent her color print Twilight. During her lifetime Frances exhibited at over 30 venues nationally and received several awards, including the 1933 Purchase Prize at the International Exhibition of Print Makers.

Gearhart's output declined after 1940 as her eyesight failed, and she died in Pasadena on April 4, 1958.

In 1990, the Cheney Cowles Museum held an exhibit of Gearhart's work, and in 2009 the Pasadena Museum of California Art mounted a major retrospective.
