= Cedar Street Bridge =

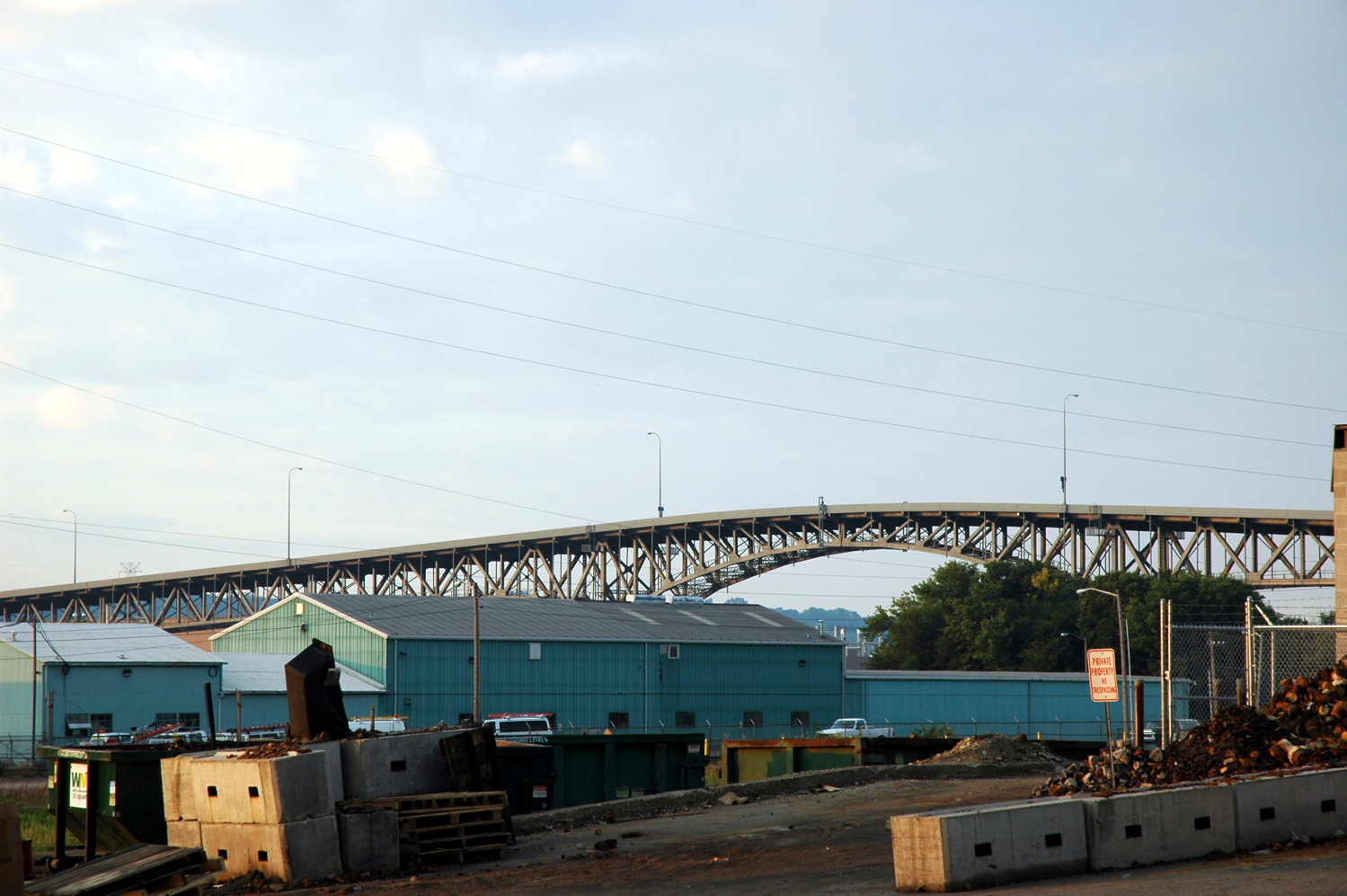
- Cedar Street Bridge. Taken just off Washington Street.
- Coordinates: 40°40′40″N 89°36′1.7″W
- Carries: 4 lanes of ILL 8/ILL 116
- Crosses: Illinois River
- Locale: Peoria, Illinois and East Peoria, Illinois
- Maintained by: Illinois Department of Transportation
- ID number: 000090003019685

Characteristics
- Design: Truss arch bridge
- Total length: 3,750 ft (1,143 m)
- Width: 40 ft (15 m)
- Load limit: 53.1 metric tons
- Clearance below: 61.7 feet (18.8 m)

History
- Opened: 1932

Statistics
- Daily traffic: 12,200

Location
- Interactive map of Cedar Street Bridge

The Cedar Street Bridge carries Illinois Route 8 and Illinois Route 116 over the Illinois River. The bridge is a steel arch design that rises approximately 70 to 80 feet (24 m) above the surface of the river. The name of the bridge comes from the original name of its street on the Peoria side of the river; the street itself is now called MacArthur Highway, while the bridge is still referred to as Cedar Street.

Completed in 1933, it received the Award of Merit plaque of the American Institute of Steel Construction as the most beautiful bridge in class A (costing more than $1,000,000) for that year.
