= Biggsville, Illinois =

- Village
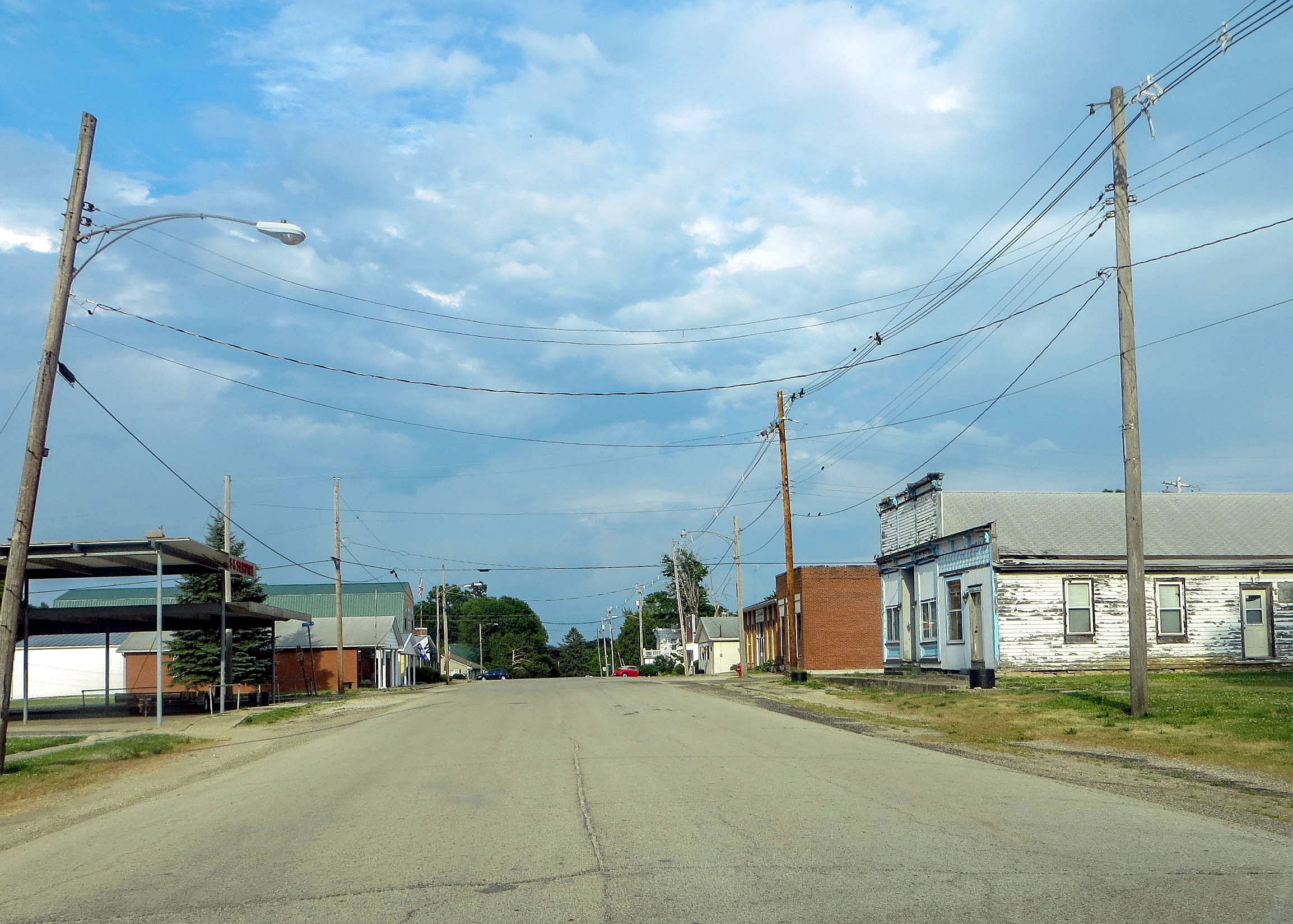
- Main Street

- Location of Biggsville in Henderson County, Illinois

- Location in Illinois Biggsville, Illinois (the United States)
- Coordinates: 40°51′13″N 90°51′44″W
- Country: United States
- State: Illinois
- County: Henderson
- Township: Biggsville

Area
  - Total: 0.34 sq mi (0.87 km^{2})
  - Land: 0.34 sq mi (0.87 km^{2})
  - Water: 0 sq mi (0.00 km^{2})
- Elevation: 640 ft (200 m)

Population (2020)
  - Total: 300
  - Density: 890.4/sq mi (343.79/km^{2})
- Time zone: UTC-6 (CST)
  - Summer (DST): UTC-5 (CDT)
- GNIS feature ID: 2398121
- FIPS code: 17-05898
- Website: villageofbiggsville.com

Biggsville is a village in Henderson County, Illinois, United States. The population was 300 at the 2020 census, down from 304 at the 2010 census. It is part of the Burlington, IA–IL Micropolitan Statistical Area.

== Geography ==
Biggsville is located in east-central Henderson County in the valley of South Henderson Creek. Illinois Route 94 passes through the center of the village, leading north 29 miles (47 km) to Aledo and south 25 miles (40 km) to La Harpe. U.S. Route 34 bypasses the village to the south, leading east 31 miles (50 km) to Galesburg and west 14 miles (23 km) to Burlington, Iowa.

According to the 2021 census gazetteer files, Biggsville has a total area of 0.34 square miles (0.88 km^{2}), all land.

== Demographics ==
Historical population
Census	Pop.	Note	%±
1860	63		—
1870	353		460.3%
1880	358		1.4%
1890	487		36.0%
1900	417		−14.4%
1910	400		−4.1%
1920	425		6.3%
1930	363		−14.6%
1940	344		−5.2%
1950	379		10.2%
1960	345		−9.0%
1970	391		13.3%
1980	411		5.1%
1990	349		−15.1%
2000	343		−1.7%
2010	304		−11.4%
2020	300		−1.3%
U.S. Decennial Census

As of the 2020 census there were 300 people, 200 households, and 134 families residing in the village. The population density was 890.21 inhabitants per square mile (343.71/km^{2}). There were 147 housing units at an average density of 436.20 per square mile (168.42/km^{2}). The racial makeup of the village was 97.00% White, 0.67% African American, 0.33% Native American, 0.00% Asian, 0.00% Pacific Islander, 0.33% from other races, and 1.67% from two or more races. Hispanic or Latino of any race were 2.00% of the population.

There were 200 households, out of which 27.0% had children under the age of 18 living with them, 53.50% were married couples living together, 7.50% had a female householder with no husband present, and 33.00% were non-families. 27.50% of all households were made up of individuals, and 8.50% had someone living alone who was 65 years of age or older. The average household size was 2.49 and the average family size was 2.19.

The village's age distribution consisted of 13.9% under the age of 18, 13.0% from 18 to 24, 30.1% from 25 to 44, 24.5% from 45 to 64, and 18.5% who were 65 years of age or older. The median age was 35.7 years. For every 100 females, there were 123.5 males. For every 100 females age 18 and over, there were 132.7 males.

The median income for a household in the village was $87,143, and the median income for a family was $87,143. Males had a median income of $63,000 versus $23,750 for females. The per capita income for the village was $73,889. About 6.0% of families and 9.6% of the population were below the poverty line, including 1.6% of those under age 18 and 7.4% of those age 65 or over.

== Notable people ==
- Todd Hamilton (born 1965), golfer
- Ora Smith (1884–1965), farmer and politician. Smith resided in Biggsville for most of his adult life and represented it in the Illinois General Assembly.
