= Illinois Route 94 =

State highway in western Illinois, US

Illinois Route 94
- Illinois Route 94 highlighted in red

Route information
- Maintained by IDOT
- Length: 128.76 mi (207.22 km)
- Existed: 1924–present

Major junctions
- South end: US 24 in Camp Point
- US 136 / IL 110 (CKC) / IL 336 in Carthage; US 34 / IL 116 in Biggsville
- North end: US 67 in Oak Grove

Location
- Country: United States
- State: Illinois
- Counties: Adams, Hancock, Henderson, Warren, Mercer, Rock Island

Highway system
- Illinois State Highway System; Interstate; US; State; Tollways; Scenic
← I-94	→ IL 95

Illinois Route 94 is a north–south state highway in western Illinois. It runs from U.S. Route 24 (US 24), east of Camp Point to U.S. Route 67, south of Oak Grove and south of the Quad Cities area. This is a distance of 128.76 miles (207.22 km).

== Route description ==
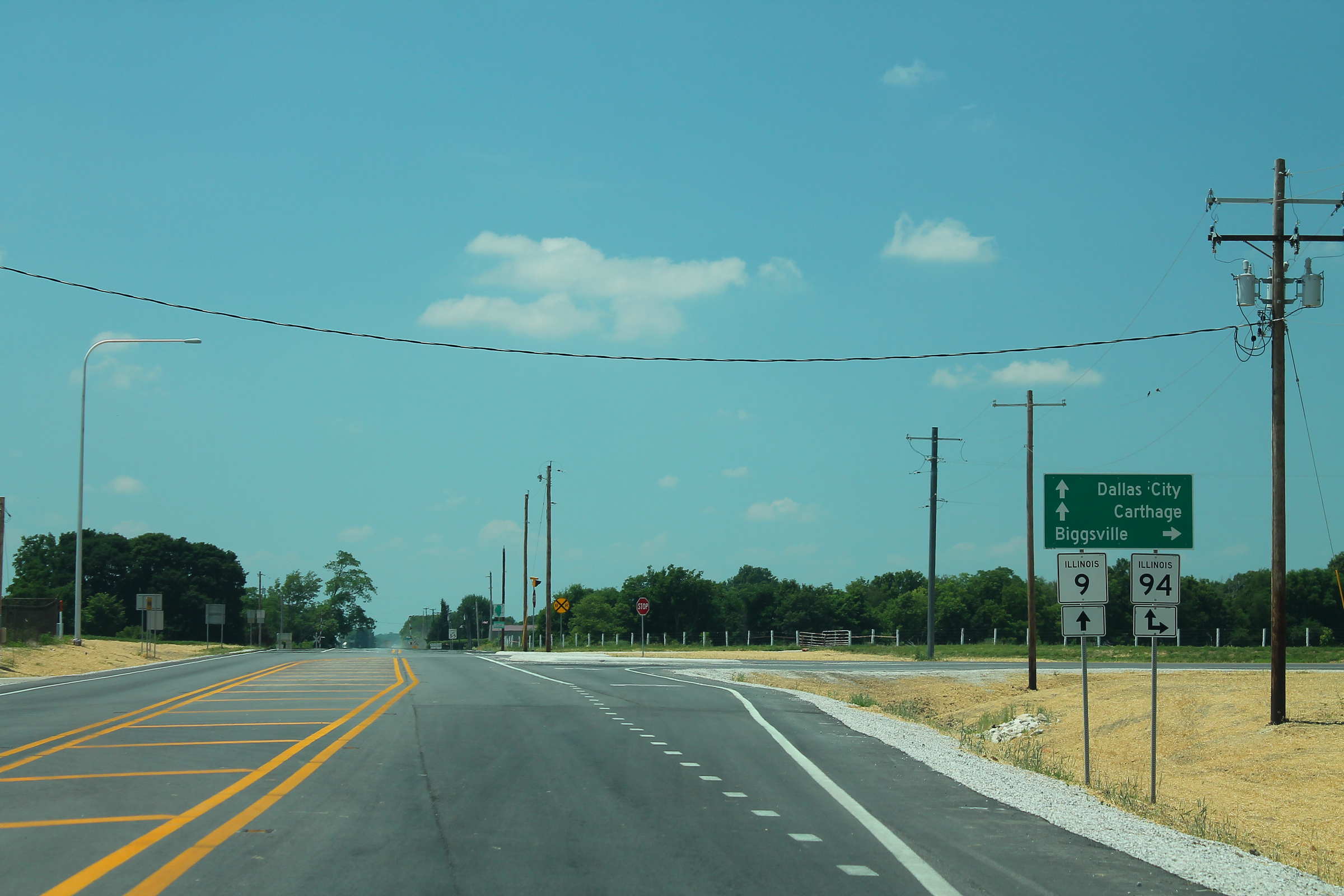
IL 9/IL 94 in La Harpe

Illinois 94 follows a complicated route north from Camp Point on its way to the Quad Cities area, making no fewer than eighteen, ninety-degree turns along the length of the route. It overlaps Illinois Route 61, Illinois Route 336, U.S. Route 136, Illinois Route 9, U.S. Route 34, Illinois Route 135 and Illinois Route 17.

== History ==
SBI Route 94 ran from Taylor Ridge, west of U.S. 67, to La Harpe, at Illinois 9. There was also a spur to Alexis, northwest of Galesburg. In March 1937, that spur was changed to Illinois Route 135 and the main route extended south to Bowen, replacing Illinois Route 94A, parts of Illinois Route 96 and Illinois Route 36. In 1955, it was extended further south to its current terminus, partially replacing Illinois Route 102. It was also extended north to U.S. 67.

Illinois 36 also ran on portions of Illinois Route 61 and U.S. Route 36.

== Future ==
This route is part of the Illinois Route 336 project in western Illinois.

== Major intersections ==
County	Location	mi	km	Destinations	Notes
Adams	Camp Point	0.0	0.0	US 24 – Mount Sterling, Quincy	
Adams		8.9	14.3	IL 61 west – Ursa	South end of IL 61 concurrency
Hancock	Bowen	15.5	24.9	IL 61 east – Macomb, Augusta	North end of IL 61 concurrency
Hancock		19.6	31.5	IL 110 (CKC) south / IL 336 south – Loraine	South end of IL 110/IL 336 concurrency
Hancock		30.9	49.7	US 136 east / IL 110 (CKC) north / IL 336 north – Macomb	North end of IL 110/IL 336 concurrency; south end of US 136 concurrency; interchange
Hancock	Carthage	32.3	52.0	US 136 west – Hamilton	North end of US 136 concurrency
Hancock		44.7	71.9	IL 9 west	South end of IL 9 concurrency
Hancock	La Harpe	52.9	85.1	IL 9 east	North end of IL 9 concurrency
Henderson		59.7	96.1	IL 96 west	
Henderson		69.7	112.2	IL 116 east – Roseville	South end of IL 116 concurrency
Henderson		74.8	120.4	US 34 / IL 116 – Burlington, Monmouth	North end of IL 116 concurrency
Henderson		82.4	132.6	IL 164	
Warren		94.8	152.6	IL 135 south	South end of IL 135 concurrency
Warren–Mercer county line		97.9	157.6	IL 135 north	North end of IL 135 concurrency
Mercer	Aledo	107.1	172.4	IL 17 west – New Boston	South end of IL 17 concurrency
Mercer	Aledo	108.0	173.8	IL 17 east – Viola	North end of IL 17 concurrency
Rock Island	Taylor Ridge	124.3	200.0	IL 192 west – Edgington	
Rock Island	Milan	127.2	204.7	CR K (Ridgewood Road, 28th Street West)	
Rock Island	Oak Grove	128.76	207.22	US 67 – Rock Island, Monmouth	
1.000 mi = 1.609 km; 1.000 km = 0.621 mi: Concurrency terminus
