= La Harpe, Illinois =

- City
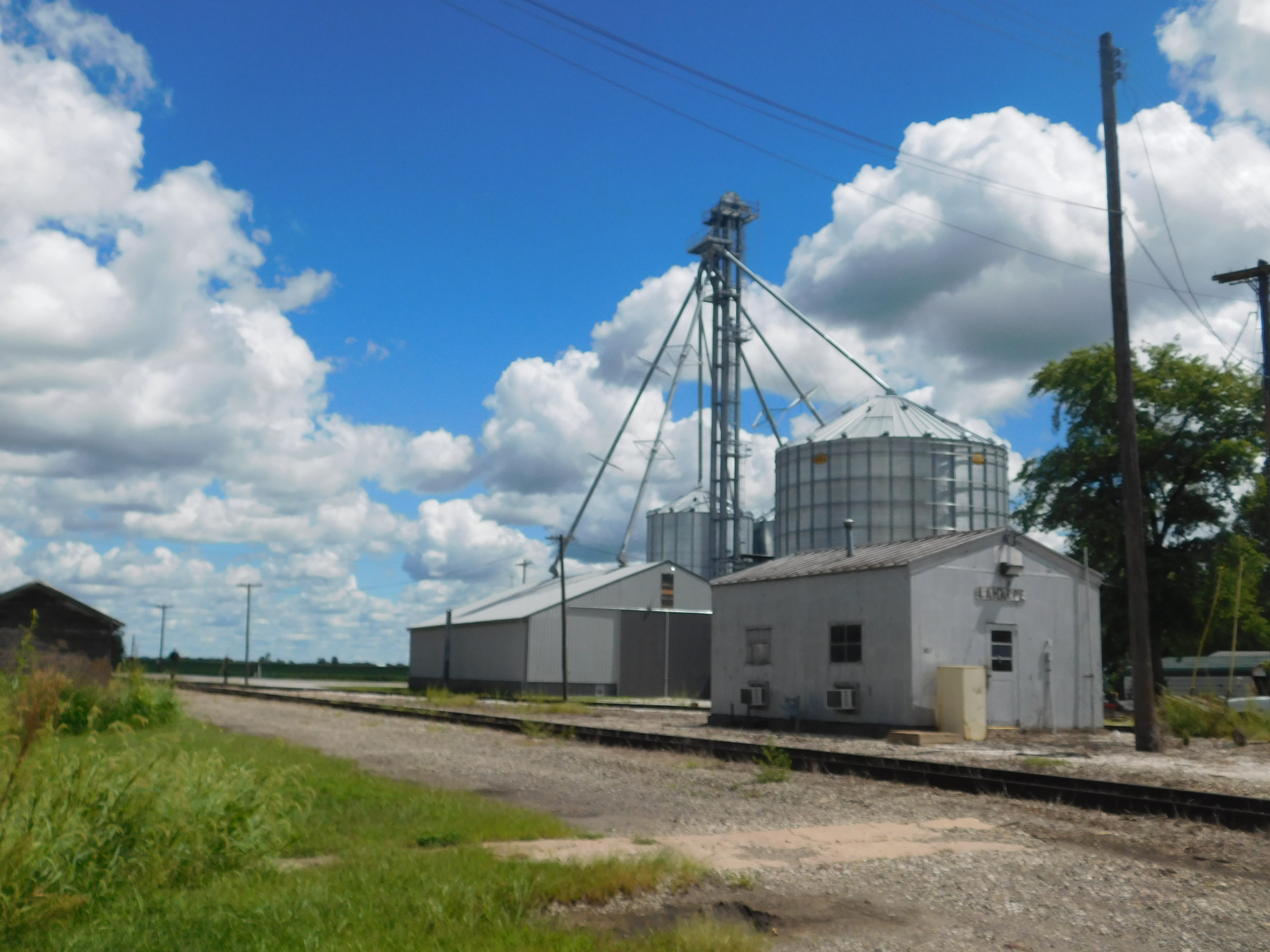
- The former Toledo, Peoria and Western Railroad tracks through La Harpe

- Location of La Harpe in Hancock County, Illinois.
- Coordinates: 40°35′05″N 90°58′10″W
- Country: United States
- State: Illinois
- County: Hancock

Area
  - Total: 1.36 sq mi (3.53 km^{2})
  - Land: 1.36 sq mi (3.53 km^{2})
  - Water: 0 sq mi (0.00 km^{2})
- Elevation: 696 ft (212 m)

Population (2020)
  - Total: 1,175
  - Density: 861.7/sq mi (332.72/km^{2})
- Time zone: UTC-6 (CST)
  - Summer (DST): UTC-5 (CDT)
- ZIP code: 61450
- Area code: 217
- FIPS code: 17-40832
- GNIS feature ID: 2395566
- Website: cityoflaharpe.com

La Harpe is a city in Hancock County, Illinois, United States. The population was 1,175 at the 2020 census.

== History ==
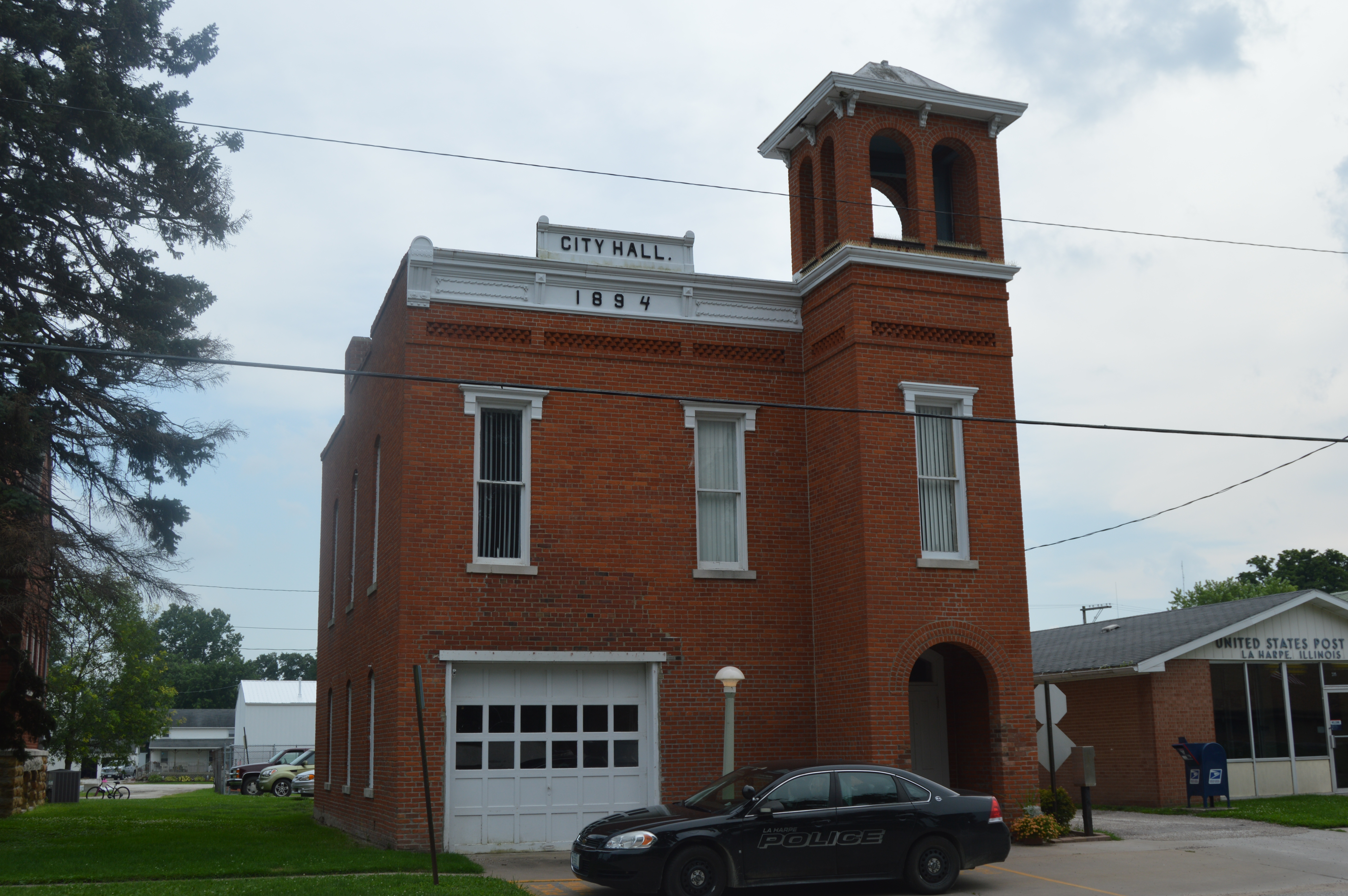
La Harpe City Hall

During the 18th century, French explorers headed by Bernard de la Harpe were forced to spend the winter just north of the present city of La Harpe. About 1896, four stone tablets dated June 15, 1715, and inscribed in French were reportedly found a few miles east of the old fortification built by the explorers. Stones were translated locally by the only French family in town as follows: "We are surrounded by indians and have no hope for survival unless help soon arrives." Said stone tablets were reported to be sent to the Smithsonian for authentication, and were ruled a hoax. Their whereabouts are currently unknown.

Soon after 1830, landowners in the area began to develop a town which they called "Franklin". In 1836, they applied for a post office and were informed another town in Illinois was already named Franklin. The first postmaster, Louis Rice Chaffin, suggested the name be registered as "La Harpe", for the Frenchman who spent the winter over 100 years earlier. The City of La Harpe was granted a charter by the Illinois legislature in 1859. The charter was amended in 1861 to change the size of the town, and the boundaries have changed through the years. Today the city has 22 streets and avenues.

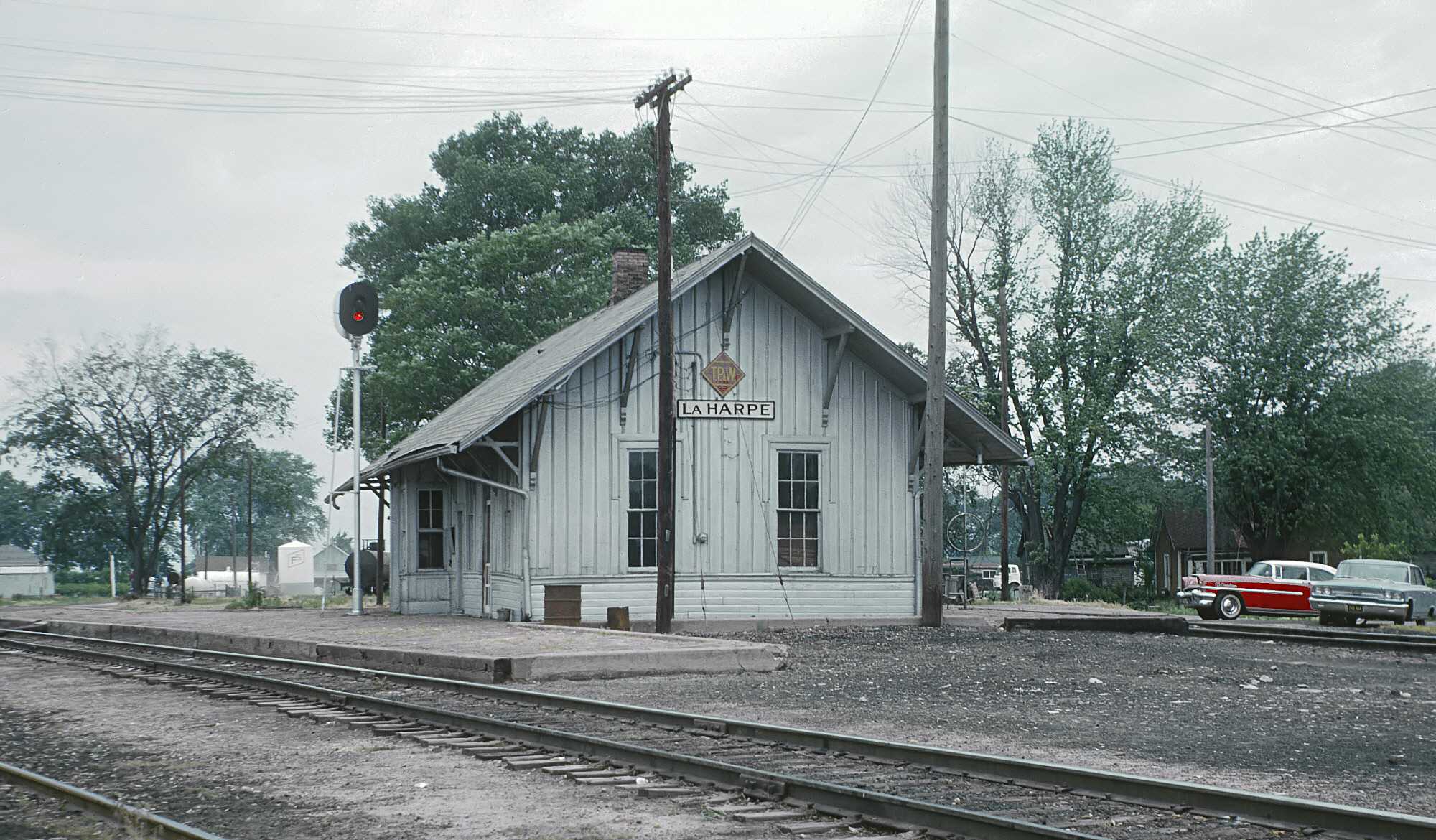
The Toledo, Peoria and Western depot in La Harpe, June 1963

In 1867, the TP&W railroad line was completed through the town. In 1888, the city council bought the first fire engine, but a fire in October 1893 still destroyed nearly all the businesses in one block of Main Street. City Hall was built in 1894. The election of 1895 was the first election in which the women of La Harpe were allowed to vote on the issue of liquor licenses. (The women had a separate ballot box.) The La Harpe Carnegie Public Library was built in 1905, with local support and a donation from Andrew Carnegie. Today it is listed on the National Register of Historic Sites. The City Park was donated by Marvin Tyron, one of the town's founders, as a public square.

In 1986, La Harpe celebrated 150 years of history. During that year, a sesquicentennial history entitled La Harpe, Illinois, 1836-1986 was published.

Each summer the town used to celebrate their Summerfest on the town square. The annual Fred Gibb Car Show is held in August. Gibb's claim to fame was as the sponsor of the original ZL-1 COPO Camaros and Novas during the pony car era of the early 1970s. Gibb's name has since been omitted from the car show.

Today, many of the surviving buildings in La Harpe's business districts, including the City Hall, are on the National Register of Historic Places. La Harpe had the only four-story building in Hancock County. The park district includes a community clubhouse, swimming pool, the LaMoine Valley golf course, and a complex of lighted ball fields. The city park has a lighted shelter house and stage.

== Geography ==
La Harpe is located in northeastern Hancock County south of the South Branch La Moine River. Illinois Route 9 passes through the city as its Main Street, leading east 25 miles (40 km) to Bushnell and west 13 miles (21 km) to Dallas City on the Mississippi River. Illinois Route 94 intersects IL 9 at the western edge of the city, and leads north 15 miles (24 km) to Stronghurst.

According to the 2021 census gazetteer files, La Harpe has a total area of 1.36 square miles (3.52 km^{2}), all land.

=== Climate ===
Climate data for La Harpe, Illinois (1991–2020 normals, extremes 1895–present)
Month	Jan	Feb	Mar	Apr	May	Jun	Jul	Aug	Sep	Oct	Nov	Dec	Year
Record high °F (°C)	70 (21)	79 (26)	88 (31)	94 (34)	105 (41)	108 (42)	110 (43)	113 (45)	103 (39)	96 (36)	83 (28)	73 (23)	113 (45)
Mean daily maximum °F (°C)	31.8 (−0.1)	36.6 (2.6)	49.3 (9.6)	61.7 (16.5)	72.3 (22.4)	81.1 (27.3)	84.6 (29.2)	83.0 (28.3)	76.7 (24.8)	64.2 (17.9)	49.3 (9.6)	37.0 (2.8)	60.6 (15.9)
Daily mean °F (°C)	23.3 (−4.8)	27.8 (−2.3)	39.3 (4.1)	50.9 (10.5)	62.0 (16.7)	71.2 (21.8)	74.6 (23.7)	72.8 (22.7)	65.3 (18.5)	53.2 (11.8)	39.9 (4.4)	28.9 (−1.7)	50.8 (10.4)
Mean daily minimum °F (°C)	14.9 (−9.5)	19.0 (−7.2)	29.3 (−1.5)	40.0 (4.4)	51.7 (10.9)	61.3 (16.3)	64.7 (18.2)	62.6 (17.0)	54.0 (12.2)	42.2 (5.7)	30.5 (−0.8)	20.8 (−6.2)	40.9 (4.9)
Record low °F (°C)	−23 (−31)	−30 (−34)	−13 (−25)	5 (−15)	26 (−3)	37 (3)	42 (6)	36 (2)	23 (−5)	1 (−17)	−3 (−19)	−26 (−32)	−30 (−34)
Average precipitation inches (mm)	1.60 (41)	1.83 (46)	2.42 (61)	3.92 (100)	5.22 (133)	4.94 (125)	4.23 (107)	3.42 (87)	3.83 (97)	3.10 (79)	2.54 (65)	2.05 (52)	39.10 (993)
Average precipitation days (≥ 0.01 in)	5.9	6.0	6.5	9.3	10.7	9.1	8.4	7.4	6.5	7.4	6.4	6.1	89.7
Source: NOAA

== Demographics ==
Historical population
Census	Pop.	Note	%±
1880	958		—
1890	1,113		16.2%
1900	1,591		42.9%
1910	1,349		−15.2%
1920	1,323		−1.9%
1930	1,175		−11.2%
1940	1,322		12.5%
1950	1,295		−2.0%
1960	1,322		2.1%
1970	1,240		−6.2%
1980	1,471		18.6%
1990	1,407		−4.4%
2000	1,385		−1.6%
2010	1,235		−10.8%
2020	1,175		−4.9%
U.S. Decennial Census

=== 2020 census ===
As of the 2020 census, La Harpe had a population of 1,175. The city also had 354 families, and the population density was 861.44 inhabitants per square mile (332.60/km^{2}). The median age was 42.7 years. 21.9% of residents were under the age of 18 and 25.1% were 65 years of age or older. For every 100 females there were 96.2 males, and for every 100 females age 18 and over there were 87.0 males age 18 and over.

0.0% of residents lived in urban areas, while 100.0% lived in rural areas.

There were 505 households in La Harpe, of which 25.0% had children under the age of 18 living in them. Of all households, 45.9% were married-couple households, 18.6% were households with a male householder and no spouse or partner present, and 29.3% were households with a female householder and no spouse or partner present. About 35.1% of all households were made up of individuals and 20.8% had someone living alone who was 65 years of age or older.

There were 568 housing units, of which 11.1% were vacant. The average housing density was 416.42 per square mile (160.78/km^{2}). The homeowner vacancy rate was 0.2% and the rental vacancy rate was 18.3%.

Racial composition as of the 2020 census
Race	Number	Percent
White	1,142	97.2%
Black or African American	6	0.5%
American Indian and Alaska Native	1	0.1%
Asian	1	0.1%
Native Hawaiian and Other Pacific Islander	0	0.0%
Some other race	2	0.2%
Two or more races	23	2.0%
Hispanic or Latino (of any race)	11	0.9%

=== Income and poverty ===
The median income for a household in the city was $37,361, and the median income for a family was $56,389. Males had a median income of $50,694 versus $19,464 for females. The per capita income for the city was $25,743. About 9.6% of families and 11.9% of the population were below the poverty line, including 29.0% of those under age 18 and 3.2% of those age 65 or over.

== Schools ==
=== Illini West High School ===
- Home of the Chargers

In August 2007, La Harpe High School, as well as Dallas City and Carthage High Schools, were deactivated through the first school convergence to be approved by voters in the state of Illinois, with much regret. Former La Harpe students are now attending the newly formed Illini West High School in Carthage, Illinois.

=== La Harpe Grade School/Jr. High ===
The La Harpe Community School District #347 was formed with the dissolution of District #335. The former High School facility was renovated extensively.

La Harpe Elementary was recently named an Illinois Spotlight School. A Spotlight School is a high poverty school where academic performance is closing the "achievement gap".

=== La Harpe High School ===
- Former home of the Eagles/Thunder/Cyclones

In 1996, the Northwestern-La Harpe Thunder football team was the first athletic team with La Harpe High School students to ever participate in the IHSA State Finals. They were defeated 35–28 by the Chenoa Redbirds. In 2000, the team once again made it to the IHSA State Finals and were defeated by the Carthage Blueboys 14–0.

In 1839, a log cabin was built to be used as a blacksmith shop. After a few years it became the first school house in La Harpe. The log cabin served as a school house until 1844, when it was sold and became a blacksmith shop again. The next school building was a brick building that had an enrollment of 98 students. This building served as a public school until the academy was built in 1857. The academy was located on the present site of the elementary school building. A new building was built in 1898 for a larger student body. This building served as the high school and elementary school until it was destroyed by fire in 1927. A new structure was built in 1929. This building was in use until 2012 when it was dismantled in anticipation of grant funding for a new school from the State of Illinois, which never materialized. The school became La Harpe Community School District on April 20, 1942. In 1958, the current high school building was built. On May 2, 1961, the former La Harpe Community School District #335 was formed from the communities of Fountain Green, Terre Haute, La Harpe, and Durham. On May 27, 2007, the high school hosted its final graduation.

== Park District ==
- Lamoine Valley Golf Club
- LaHarpe Community Swimming Pool

== Notable people ==
- Harold Arlin, radio's first salaried announcer, born in La Harpe
- Charles Duryea, co-inventor of the first gasoline-powered automobile
- John Fuhrer, triple jumper and football coach, born in La Harpe
- Olive Oatman, pioneer Mormon teenager abducted by Native Americans (1851)
- Olan Soule, actor, born in La Harpe
