= Illinois Route 164 =

State highway in western Illinois, US

Illinois Route 164
- IL 164 highlighted in red

Route information
- Maintained by IDOT
- Length: 35.70 mi (57.45 km)
- Existed: 1937–present

Major junctions
- West end: US 34 in Gladstone
- US 34 / US 67 / IL 110 (CKC) in Monmouth
- East end: US 34 / IL 41 / IL 110 (CKC) in Galesburg

Location
- Country: United States
- State: Illinois
- Counties: Henderson, Warren, Knox

Highway system
- Illinois State Highway System; Interstate; US; State; Tollways; Scenic
← IL 163	→ IL 165

Illinois Route 164 is a state road in rural western Illinois. It runs from U.S. Route 34 in Gladstone to U.S. Route 34 and Illinois Route 41 in Galesburg. This distance is 35.70 miles (57.45 km).

== Route description ==
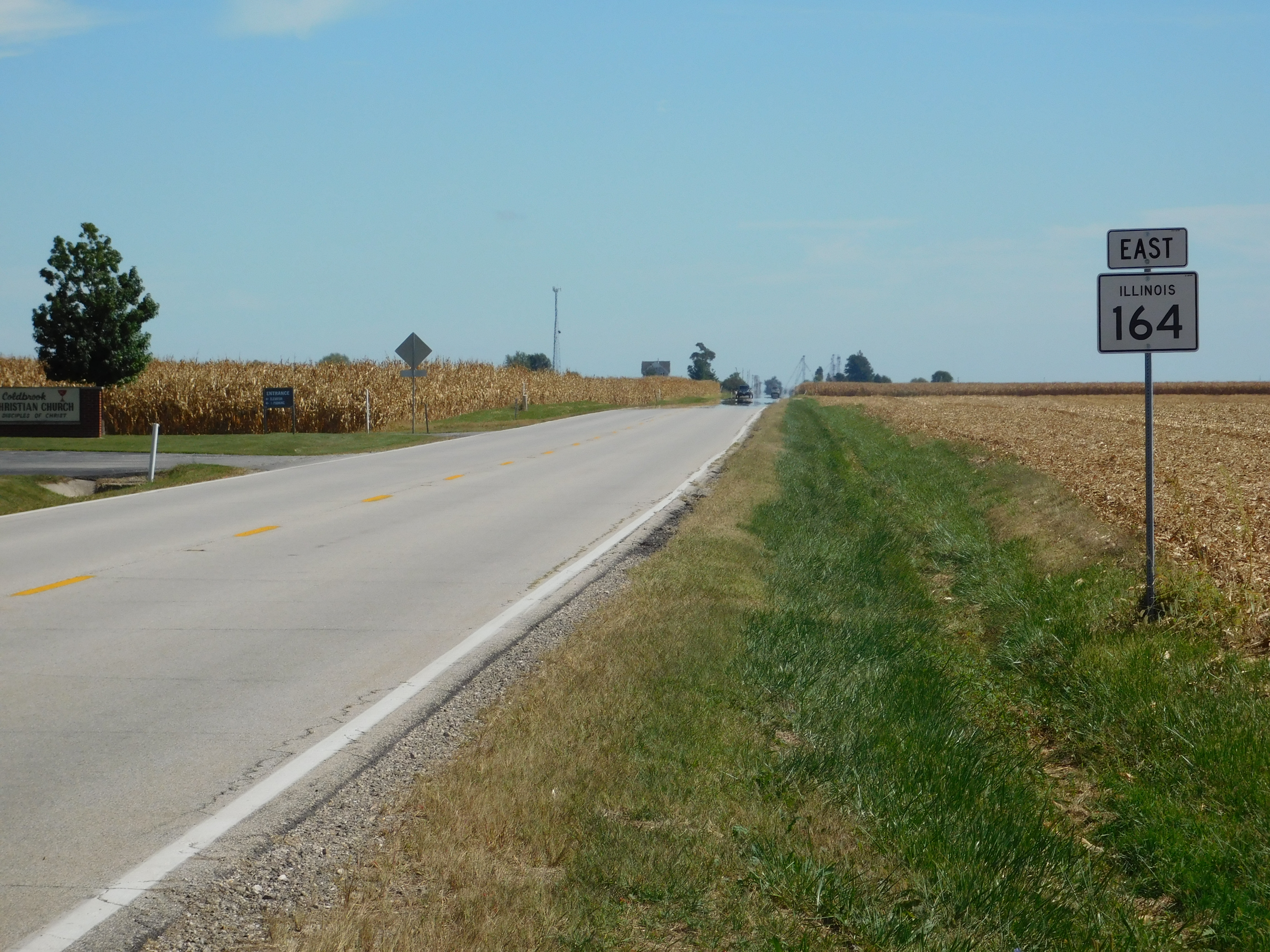
IL 164 east through Warren County

Illinois 164 is the main access road from Monmouth (the county seat of Warren County) to Oquawka (the county seat of Henderson County). It is a rural, two-lane road for its entire length. From Gladstone to Oquawka the route runs north–south; at Oquawka Illinois 164 turns east.

== History ==
In 1924, SBI Route 164 was originally the route from Pekin to west of Bloomington, now part of Illinois Route 9.

In 1937, IL 164 was assigned to the road that had been IL 94A from Monmouth to Gladstone.

This route still exists today in Warren and Henderson Counties. The route was extended in the late 1990s along the old U.S. 34 alignment between Monmouth and Galesburg, after completion of the 4-lane freeway upgrade of US 34 in this section. The current eastern terminus is U.S. 150 at corner of Henderson and Main Streets in Galesburg. This was the historic northern terminus of IL 41.

== Major intersections ==
County	Location	mi	km	Destinations	Notes
Henderson	Gladstone	0.0	0.0	US 34 / Great River Road south	West end of Great River Road overlap
Henderson	Oquawka	6.9	11.1	Great River Road north	East end of Great River Road overlap
Henderson		10.6	17.1	IL 94	
Warren		16.7	26.9	IL 135 north	
Warren	Monmouth	21.1	34.0	US 34 west / US 67 south / IL 110 (CKC) west	West end of US 34/US 67/IL 110 overlap
Warren	Monmouth	22.6	36.4	US 67 north (Main Street)	East end of US 67 overlap
Warren		24.8	39.9	US 34 / IL 110 (CKC) east	East end of US 34/IL 110 overlap
Knox	Galesburg	35.8	57.6	US 34 / IL 110 (CKC) – Kewanee, Monmouth	
Knox	Galesburg			IL 41 south (Main Street)	Continuation beyond US 34
1.000 mi = 1.609 km; 1.000 km = 0.621 mi: Concurrency terminus
