= Gladstone, Illinois =

- Village
- Location of Gladstone in Henderson County, Illinois.

- Location of Illinois in the United States
- Coordinates: 40°51′52″N 90°57′24″W
- Country: United States
- State: Illinois
- County: Henderson
- Township: Gladstone

Area
  - Total: 0.36 sq mi (0.93 km^{2})
  - Land: 0.36 sq mi (0.93 km^{2})
  - Water: 0 sq mi (0.00 km^{2})
- Elevation: 558 ft (170 m)

Population (2020)
  - Total: 234
  - Density: 650.4/sq mi (251.13/km^{2})
- Time zone: UTC-6 (CST)
  - Summer (DST): UTC-5 (CDT)
- ZIP Code(s): 61437
- Area code: 309
- FIPS code: 17-29431
- GNIS feature ID: 2398966
- Wikimedia Commons: Gladstone, Illinois

Gladstone is a village in Henderson County, Illinois, United States. The population was 234 at the 2020 census. It is part of the Burlington, IA–IL Micropolitan Statistical Area.

== History ==
Gladstone grew from a Meskwaki village that was led by Taimah in the 1820s. Gladstone was originally named "Sagetown", after Gideon Sage upon whose land the town was platted. Gladstone is named after the English statesman William Ewart Gladstone.

== Geography ==
Gladstone is located in west-central Henderson County. Illinois Route 164 passes through the village, leading north 5 miles (8 km) to Oquawka, the county seat, and south 1 mile (1.6 km) to U.S. Route 34. Burlington, Iowa, is 10 miles (16 km) southwest of Gladstone via IL-164 and US-34.

According to the 2021 census gazetteer files, Gladstone has a total area of 0.36 square miles (0.93 km^{2}), all land.

== Climate ==
According to the Köppen Climate Classification system, Gladstone has a hot-summer humid continental climate, abbreviated "Dfa" on climate maps. The hottest temperature recorded in Gladstone was 105 °F (40.6 °C) on July 1, 1938, while the coldest temperature recorded was −26 °F (−32.2 °C) on February 4, 1996 and January 16, 2009.

Climate data for Gladstone, Illinois, 1991–2020 normals, extremes 1938–present
Month	Jan	Feb	Mar	Apr	May	Jun	Jul	Aug	Sep	Oct	Nov	Dec	Year
Record high °F (°C)	65 (18)	77 (25)	84 (29)	89 (32)	98 (37)	98 (37)	105 (41)	102 (39)	99 (37)	93 (34)	80 (27)	74 (23)	105 (41)
Mean maximum °F (°C)	54.8 (12.7)	58.8 (14.9)	72.2 (22.3)	81.1 (27.3)	87.2 (30.7)	92.8 (33.8)	95.0 (35.0)	93.8 (34.3)	91.0 (32.8)	83.8 (28.8)	70.0 (21.1)	58.1 (14.5)	96.6 (35.9)
Mean daily maximum °F (°C)	32.2 (0.1)	36.6 (2.6)	49.0 (9.4)	62.3 (16.8)	72.7 (22.6)	82.1 (27.8)	85.5 (29.7)	83.8 (28.8)	77.5 (25.3)	64.8 (18.2)	49.9 (9.9)	37.4 (3.0)	61.2 (16.2)
Daily mean °F (°C)	24.0 (−4.4)	28.2 (−2.1)	39.7 (4.3)	52.0 (11.1)	62.9 (17.2)	72.9 (22.7)	76.2 (24.6)	74.3 (23.5)	66.9 (19.4)	54.7 (12.6)	41.2 (5.1)	29.8 (−1.2)	51.9 (11.1)
Mean daily minimum °F (°C)	15.9 (−8.9)	19.9 (−6.7)	30.3 (−0.9)	41.8 (5.4)	53.1 (11.7)	63.1 (17.3)	66.9 (19.4)	64.8 (18.2)	56.3 (13.5)	44.5 (6.9)	32.5 (0.3)	22.1 (−5.5)	42.6 (5.9)
Mean minimum °F (°C)	−6.1 (−21.2)	−0.5 (−18.1)	11.7 (−11.3)	28.5 (−1.9)	40.2 (4.6)	51.6 (10.9)	57.8 (14.3)	56.0 (13.3)	42.9 (6.1)	30.2 (−1.0)	17.1 (−8.3)	2.7 (−16.3)	−10.1 (−23.4)
Record low °F (°C)	−26 (−32)	−26 (−32)	−8 (−22)	18 (−8)	31 (−1)	42 (6)	49 (9)	47 (8)	29 (−2)	18 (−8)	1 (−17)	−15 (−26)	−26 (−32)
Average precipitation inches (mm)	1.39 (35)	1.69 (43)	2.35 (60)	3.77 (96)	5.02 (128)	4.66 (118)	4.03 (102)	3.60 (91)	3.62 (92)	2.80 (71)	2.45 (62)	1.81 (46)	37.19 (944)
Average snowfall inches (cm)	4.9 (12)	6.3 (16)	1.8 (4.6)	0.3 (0.76)	0.0 (0.0)	0.0 (0.0)	0.0 (0.0)	0.0 (0.0)	0.0 (0.0)	0.1 (0.25)	0.3 (0.76)	3.2 (8.1)	16.9 (42.47)
Average precipitation days (≥ 0.01 in)	7.1	7.2	8.4	10.2	11.9	10.4	8.8	8.7	7.2	7.9	7.8	7.3	102.9
Average snowy days (≥ 0.1 in)	2.3	1.7	0.8	0.1	0.0	0.0	0.0	0.0	0.0	0.0	0.5	1.5	6.9
Source 1: NOAA
Source 2: National Weather Service

== Demographics ==
Historical population
Census	Pop.	Note	%±
1900	433		—
1910	385		−11.1%
1920	450		16.9%
1930	274		−39.1%
1940	367		33.9%
1950	340		−7.4%
1960	356		4.7%
1970	344		−3.4%
1980	354		2.9%
1990	270		−23.7%
2000	284		5.2%
2010	281		−1.1%
2020	234		−16.7%
U.S. Decennial Census

As of the 2020 census there were 234 people, 95 households, and 34 families residing in the village. The population density was 650.00 inhabitants per square mile (250.97/km^{2}). There were 121 housing units at an average density of 336.11 per square mile (129.77/km^{2}). The racial makeup of the village was 96.15% White, 0.43% African American, 0.85% Native American, 0.00% Asian, 0.00% Pacific Islander, 0.00% from other races, and 2.56% from two or more races. Hispanic or Latino of any race were 1.28% of the population.

There were 95 households, out of which 7.4% had children under the age of 18 living with them, 25.26% were married couples living together, 4.21% had a female householder with no husband present, and 64.21% were non-families. 57.89% of all households were made up of individuals, and 29.47% had someone living alone who was 65 years of age or older. The average household size was 2.38 and the average family size was 1.53.

The village's age distribution consisted of 11.0% under the age of 18, 4.1% from 18 to 24, 18% from 25 to 44, 31.8% from 45 to 64, and 35.2% who were 65 years of age or older. The median age was 58.5 years. For every 100 females, there were 81.3 males. For every 100 females age 18 and over, there were 84.3 males.

The median income for a household in the village was $30,250, and the median income for a family was $65,833. Males had a median income of $43,250 versus $18,750 for females. The per capita income for the village was $26,854. About 5.9% of families and 13.8% of the population were below the poverty line, including 31.3% of those under age 18 and noen of those age 65 or over.

== Notable people ==
- Lauren Mayberry (born 1987), Scottish musician and lead singer of Chvrches, lived in Gladstone as a foreign exchange student.
