= Bi-County Conference =

Illinois high school conference

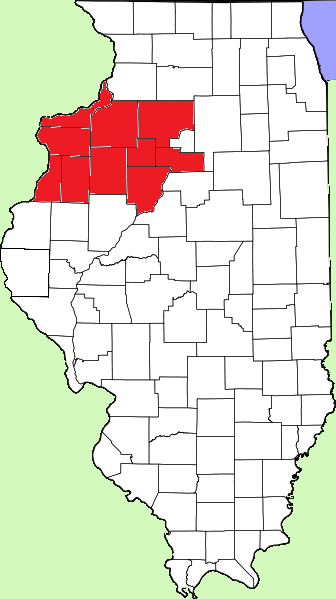
The Lincoln Trail Conference within Illinois

The Bi-County Conference was a high school conference in western central Illinois. The conference par in athletics and activities in the Illinois High School Association (IHSA). The conference comprised nine public high schools with small enrollments in portions of Fulton, Hancock, Henderson, McDonough, and Warren counties.

== Former membership ==
School	Location	Mascot	Colors	Enrollment	IHSA Classes 2/3/4	IHSA Music Class	IHSA Football Class	IHSA Cheerleading Class
Avon High School	Avon, IL	Trojans		70	A/1A/1A	D	1A	Small squad
Dallas City High School	Dallas City, IL	Bulldogs		154	A/1A/1A	D	1A	Small squad
La Harpe High School	La Harpe, IL	Eagles		150	A/1A/2A	D	1A	Small squad
Northwestern High School	Sciota, IL	Huskies		100	A/1A/1A	D	1A	Small squad
Roseville High School	Roseville, IL	Panthers		229	A/1A/1A	D	1A	Small squad
Southern High School	Stronghurst, IL	Rebels		100	A/1A/1A	D	1A	Small squad
Union High School	Biggsville, IL	Yankees		200	A/1A/1A	D	1A	Small squad
Warren High School	Monmouth, IL	Warriors		100	A/1A/1A	D	1A	Small squad
Yorkwood High School	Monmouth, IL	Golden Bears		100	A/1A/1A	D	1A	Small squad
Alexis High School	Alexis, IL	Cardinals		120	A/1A/1A			Small squad

Sources:IHSA Conferences and IHSA Member Schools Directory

== History ==
The conference originally consisted of nine schools. It was believed to have been formed in the 1970s at some point. The conference was very competitive. All of these schools were small schools. In the 1990s, La Harpe and Northwestern formed a co-op (the Thunder), which would ultimately cause the demise of the conference. Soon after, Dallas City would leave the conference, as would Roseville; however, the Bi-County would acquire Spoon River Valley and Alexis. 1997-98 was the final year of the conference. La Harpe-Northwestern won the football title that year. As of now, Northwestern and Colchester have consolidated to form West Prairie High School. Avon High School has co-oped with Abingdon High School. Dallas City has consolidated with La Harpe and Carthage to form Illini West High School. Roseville and Monmouth have consolidated to form Monmouth-Roseville High School. Southern High School and Union High School have consolidated to form West Central High School. Yorkwood, Alexis, and Warren have consolidated to form United High School.
