= West Central High School (Illinois) =

Location
- 1514 U.S. Route 34; Biggsville, Illinois 61418; United States; 40°50′58″N 90°54′03″W

Information
- Type: Public
- Established: 2005
- School district: West Central Community Unit School District 235
- Principal: Jason Kirby
- Grades: 9–12
- Enrollment: 255 (2016-17)
- Campus: Rural
- Colors: Red, white, blue
- Team name: Heat
- Website: Official website

West Central High School (WCHS) is a public four-year high school located near Biggsville, Illinois, U.S. WCHS is part of West Central Community Unit School District 235, which serves the communities of Oquawka, Gladstone, Biggsville, Gulf Port, Stronghurst, Media, Raritan, Smithshire, and Carman. The campus is two miles (3.2 km) west of Biggsville at the intersection of State Route 94 and US 34, 15 miles (24 km) northeast of Burlington, Iowa, as well as 15 miles (24 km) south west of Monmouth, Illinois, and serves a mixed mostly rural residential community. West Central High School was formed by the consolidation of Union High School and Southern High School in 2005.

== Academics ==
West Central High School teaches courses in the following academic departments:

- Agriculture
- Art
- Business & Computers
- Drivers Education
- English
- Family & Consumer Education
- History
- Industrial Arts
- Media
- Math
- Music
- PE & Health
- Science
- Spanish

== Athletics ==
West Central High School competes in the Lincoln Trail Conference and is a member school in the Illinois High School Association. Its mascot is The Heat. The school has no current team state championships on record in team athletics or activities. Theresa Brokaw was 2006 state champion, the first year of the new school, in the IHSA Class A girls' 1600 meter run. However, one of its predecessor schools, Biggsville High School, won back-to-back state championships in Boys' Track and Field in 1898-1899 and 1899-1900.

== History ==
The history of West Central high school is the history of its preceding component schools:

- Biggsville High School
- Gladstone High School
- Oquawka High School
- Stronghurst High School
- Wever High School (Media)
- Gladstone-Oquawka High School
- Union High School
- Southern High School

=== Biggsville High School ===
On April 13, 1895, an election was held in the First National Bank of Biggsville for the purpose of voting for or against a township high school. The vote was in favor of the school. The high school probably started operation in the fall of 1895, but there is no record as to where school was held. The first election for directors for the new school was held May 18, 1895. Those elected were: Isaac William McQuown, Henry Cowden, August Wiegand, Robert McMillen, and William Plummer. The first high school building was built in 1896 and sat just west of the present Biggsville Methodist Church. The cost of the frame structure building was $8,000. It was not modern by today's standards. Mr J. A. Strong was the first principal. His salary was $850 per year. He organized the school, bought and arranged the library, prepared the first course of study, provided the system of records, secured the laboratory equipment, and did all the teaching himself for the first few months.

The high school course of study was limited to three years from 1896 to 1900. Then it was increased to four years. Students were admitted to the high school by examination only. In 1900 the school library had 600 books. These books were selected with reference to the course of study. The school was on the accredited list of the University of Illinois. The first high school building and its contents were destroyed by fire on July 26, 1906. Classes were held in the Wiegand Building on Main Street while the new building was being built.

The second high school building was built in 1906-1907 and was occupied in 1907. Members of the school board were: August Wiegand, D. F. Whiteman, John McIntosh, Dr W. A. Henderson, and John Pearson. L. O. Culp was principal. Diplomas were issued to those who had completed the four years work prescribed in the course of study. In addition to completing the course of study, students were required to write a thesis of not less than 1200 and not more than 2000 words.

The use of tobacco in any form was forbidden on the school grounds. Violation of the rule was considered cause for suspension or expulsion. During the early years various means of transportation were used to get to school. Some students rode horses to town, stabled them, and rode them home after school. Cars furnished a popular way for those who could afford them. Busing of students started during the 1940s. At first there was only one bus, and it had to make several trips to get students to school and back home. Later, more buses were added. Hot lunches were introduced during the years 1948-1949. Meals were first served in the home economics room. Later, lunches were prepared and served in the gum. The brick gym was built in 1925, after a frame building, built three years before, was destroyed by fire. The new addition to the second building was ready for the school year 1949-1950. The new facilities gave much needed equipment and space for science, home economics, and vocational agriculture.

The Class of 1960 was the last class to graduate from the old Biggsville Township High School. The Class of 1961 was the first to graduate from the new Union High School.

The town of Biggsville is technically the address given to Union High School, though the school itself is located in the country two miles west of Biggsville at the intersection of US 94 and US 34.

=== Gladstone High School ===
Gladstone, Illinois had its own high school as recently as the late 1940s. It was in the fall of 1949 that a consolidation effort with its neighbor to the north, Oquawka, took place and the Gladstone-Oquawka School District was initiated.

=== Oquawka High School ===
The residents Oquawka, Illinois have a long history of education in regards to their children. It was in 1914 that the first students attended classes of Oquawka Township High School. According to Marilyn Thompson Stailey, these first classes were held in the German Lutheran Church in Oquawka. It was in 1948 that the towns of Oquawka and Gladstone initiated consolidation talks. This initiative was completed and became a reality in 1949. The Gladstone-Oquawka School District was started, effectively ending the solo educational system of Oquawka. The Gladstone-Oquawka School District eventually joined a consolidation effort of all the schools in western Henderson County, Union. The students of Oquawka now attend school as part of the consolidated West Central School District in Biggsville.

=== Stronghurst High School ===
Stronghurst, Illinois residents began an educational system for their children in the late 19th century. In either the early 20th century or late 19th century it is assumed Stronghurst High School was established. The high school served the town for about seven decades. It was in the late 1960s/early 1970s that consolidation talks with nearby Media Wever High School, and possibly others in the area, took place. This consolidation effort resulted in the creation of the Southern School District in 1971.

The high school for the newly consolidated district was located in Stronghurst. The Southern School lasted for about 34 years when, in 2005, a new school district was again formed with nearby Biggsville Union High School. This was named the West Central School District. The high school for this district is located in Biggsville. The former Stronghurst High School building is now used as the West Central Junior High building.

=== Wever High School (Media) ===
Media, Illinois started its school system much like other small towns of its day, in the late 19th century. The school is named Wever after the founder, Nathan Wever, who began the school as a private academy. Wever platted the town in 1888 when the railroad was built through the area. The school lasted several decades, providing an education for the children of Media. This ended when a consolidation effort with nearby Stronghurst, Illinois took place in 1971. Media Wever High School was absorbed into the newly created Stronghurst Southern School District. The old Media Wever building housed the Southern Junior High School for many years. Today the school serves as part of the West Central School District. The Media Wever High School building stands in town today.

=== Gladstone-Oquawka High School ===
Both Gladstone, Illinois, and Oquawka, Illinois, supported their own high schools through the late 1940s. It was in the fall of 1949 that a consolidation effort took place and the Gladstone-Oquawka School District was initiated. This district lasted for eleven years. In 1960, Gladstone-Oquawka High School consolidated with Biggsville and created the Union School District. The Gladstone-Qquawka high school building still stands, though it is now used for storage purposes. The original Gladstone high school gym is across the street from the old Gladstone-Oquawka High School/Tri-valley Middle School buildings. The gym is connected by the Gladstone grade school that was built in 1969.

=== Union High School ===
In the early 1960s the four towns of Biggsville, Gladstone, Gulf Port, and Oquawka entered into a consolidation effort of the high schools of Biggsville and Gladsone-Oquawka High Schools. The year was 1960 when this effort led to the creation of the Union School District. The high school for the Union District was located near Biggsville. The building served these communities for about 45 years. In 2005 Biggsville Union High agreed to consolidate their educational efforts with its neighbor from the south, Stronghurst Southern High School. The new District was named the West Central School District. Biggsville Union HS is the home to West Central High School.

=== Southern High School ===
Both Stronghurst, Illinois and Media, Illinois supported their own high schools for several decades. The late 1960s brought a consolidation effort between the high schools of Stronghurst and Media. The effort was realized in 1971 with the creation of the Southern School District. Southern High School was located and remained in the Stronghurst High School building. Southern High served the towns and southeast area of Henderson County for 34 years. In 2005 a new consolidation effort was realized between the school districts of Biggsville Union and Stronghurst Southern. The new district was called the West Central School District. The high school for the West Central School District was located in Biggsville. The Stronghurst High School building remains in use as a grade school for the West Central District.

=== Timeline ===
- 1895 - Biggsville High School established
- 1914 - Oquawka High School established
- 1949 - Gladstone High School and Oquawka High School consolidate to form Gladstone-Oquawka High School
- 1960 - Biggsville High School and Gladstone-Qquawka High School consolidate to form Union High School
- 1971 - Stronghurst High School and Wever High School (Media) consolidate to form Southern High School
- 2005 - Union High School and Southern High School consolidate to form West Central High School
