= Alexis Phelps House =

Historic house in Illinois, United States

- U.S. National Register of Historic Places
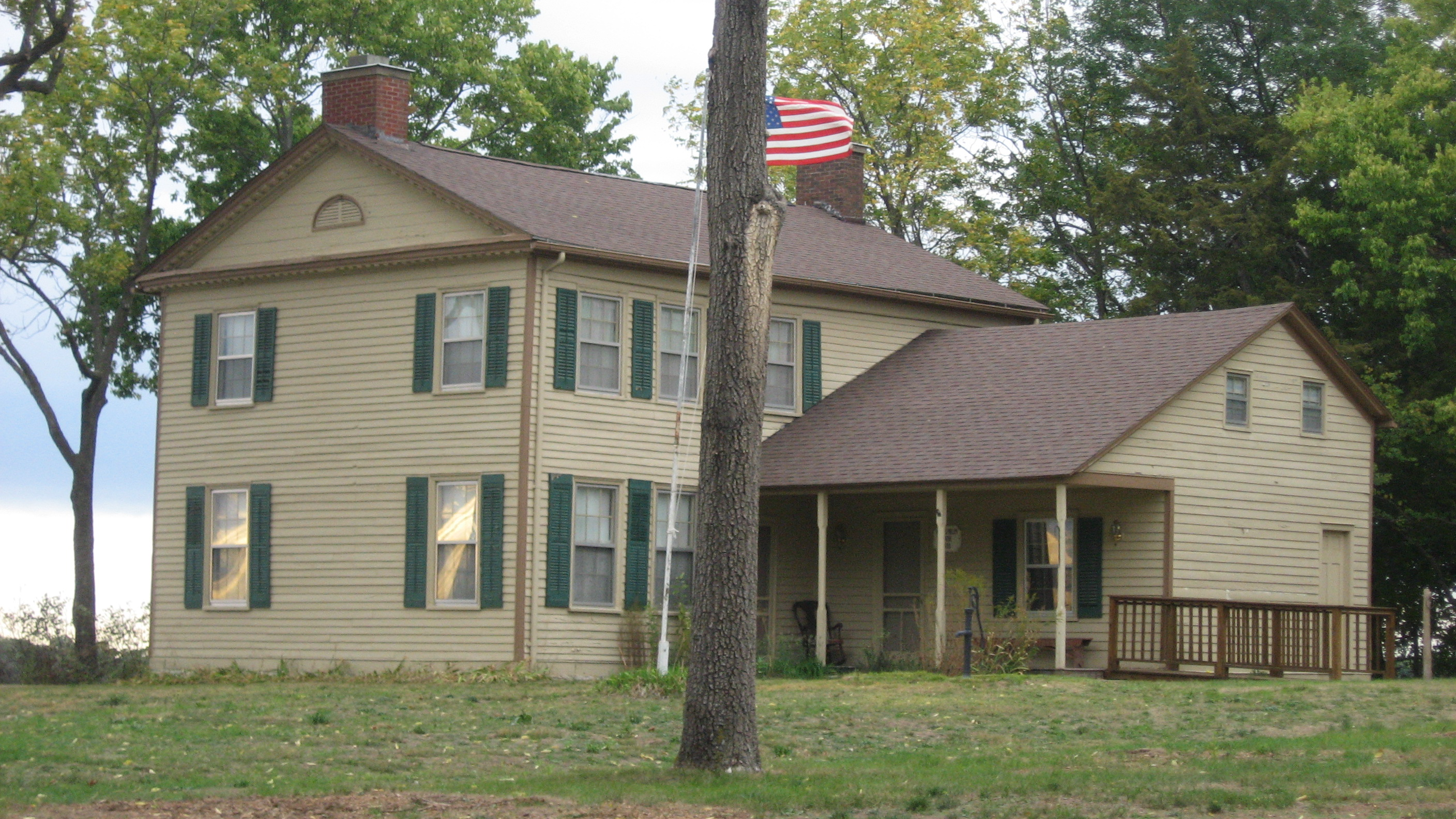
- Rear and southern side

- Location within Illinois Location within the United States
- Location: On Mississippi River, Oquawka, Illinois
- Coordinates: 40°56′20.5″N 90°57′19.5″W
- Area: Less than 1 acre (0.40 ha)
- Built: c. 1833
- Built by: Alexis Phelps
- NRHP reference No.: 82002537
- Added to NRHP: April 28, 1982

The Alexis Phelps House is a historic home located on the Mississippi River at Oquawka in Henderson County, Illinois, United States. The New England–style house was built in 1832-1833 by Alexis Phelps, a fur trader and one of the first settlers of the region. Phelps, who was born in Palmyra, New York, settled on a piece of land known as Yellow Banks, which his brother Stephen had purchased in 1828. Alexis and Stephen Phelps founded Oquawka, which they named for the Native American name for Yellow Banks, in 1836. Stephen A. Douglas, who frequently presided over the Henderson County Circuit Court, stayed in the house during his visits to Oquawka. The house was also rumored to be a stop on the Underground Railroad.

The house was added to the National Register of Historic Places on April 28, 1982. The Henderson County Historical Society rehabilitated the house in the 1980s, saving it from demolition. The historical society now leases the house for events.
