= Hopper, Illinois =

- Unincorporated community
- Location within Illinois Location within the United States
- Coordinates: 40°47′08″N 90°59′27″W
- Country: United States
- State: Illinois
- County: Henderson
- Elevation: 577 ft (176 m)
- Time zone: UTC-6 (Central (CST))
  - Summer (DST): UTC-5 (CDT)
- Area code: 309
- GNIS feature ID: 422821

Hopper is an unincorporated community in Stronghurst Township, Henderson County, Illinois, United States. Hopper is located on County Route 6, 5.3 miles (8.5 km) west-northwest of Stronghurst.

== History ==
Hopper was originally named Warren, Illinois. The village was laid out by Lambert Hopper on March 25, 1840. It was often called Hopper's Mill in the 19th century because Lambert Hopper and his son, Wesley Hopper, operated a thriving lumber mill in the area.
