= Oquawka Township, Henderson County, Illinois =

Oquawka Township
- Township
- Location in Henderson County

- Henderson County's location in Illinois
- Coordinates: 40°57′21″N 90°56′13″W
- Country: United States
- State: Illinois
- County: Henderson
- Established: November 6, 1906

Area
  - Total: 28.51 sq mi (73.8 km^{2})
  - Land: 24.22 sq mi (62.7 km^{2})
  - Water: 4.29 sq mi (11.1 km^{2}) 15.04%
- Elevation: 568 ft (173 m)

Population (2020)
  - Total: 1,659
  - Density: 68.50/sq mi (26.45/km^{2})
- Time zone: UTC-6 (CST)
  - Summer (DST): UTC-5 (CDT)
- ZIP codes: 61418, 61437, 61469
- FIPS code: 17-071-56250

Oquawka Township is one of eleven townships in Henderson County, Illinois, USA. As of the 2020 census, its population was 1,659 and it contained 908 housing units.

== Geography ==
According to the 2021 census gazetteer files, Oquawka Township has a total area of 28.51 square miles (73.84 km^{2}), of which 24.22 square miles (62.73 km^{2}) (or 84.96%) is land and 4.29 square miles (11.11 km^{2}) (or 15.04%) is water.

=== Cities, towns, villages ===
- Oquawka

=== Unincorporated towns ===
- Milroy at 41.018648°N 90.920975°W

(This list is based on USGS data and may include former settlements.)

=== Cemeteries ===
The township contains these two cemeteries: County Farm and Oquawka.

=== Major highways ===
- Illinois Route 164

=== Lakes ===
- Island Lake
- White House Lake

=== Landmarks ===
- Benton Island
- Delabar State Park
- Mill Island

== Demographics ==
As of the 2020 census there were 1,659 people, 1,021 households, and 641 families residing in the township. The population density was 58.20 inhabitants per square mile (22.47/km^{2}). There were 908 housing units at an average density of 31.85 per square mile (12.30/km^{2}). The racial makeup of the township was 93.91% White, 0.96% African American, 0.18% Native American, 0.30% Asian, 0.24% Pacific Islander, 0.60% from other races, and 3.80% from two or more races. Hispanic or Latino of any race were 1.51% of the population.

There were 1,021 households, out of which 26.20% had children under the age of 18 living with them, 45.94% were married couples living together, 10.28% had a female householder with no spouse present, and 37.22% were non-families. 29.40% of all households were made up of individuals, and 16.50% had someone living alone who was 65 years of age or older. The average household size was 2.16 and the average family size was 2.57.

The township's age distribution consisted of 15.4% under the age of 18, 7.9% from 18 to 24, 17.4% from 25 to 44, 29.9% from 45 to 64, and 29.5% who were 65 years of age or older. The median age was 52.6 years. For every 100 females, there were 101.9 males. For every 100 females age 18 and over, there were 95.2 males.

The median income for a household in the township was $43,727, and the median income for a family was $56,181. Males had a median income of $32,917 versus $30,250 for females. The per capita income for the township was $24,384. About 10.6% of families and 11.9% of the population were below the poverty line, including 19.8% of those under age 18 and 2.1% of those age 65 or over.

Historical population
Census	Pop.	Note	%±
2000	2,366		—
2010	1,997		−15.6%
2020	1,659		−16.9%
U.S. Decennial Census

== School districts ==
- West Central Community Unit School District 235
- Westmer Community Unit School District 203

== Political districts ==
- Illinois's 17th congressional district
- State House District 94
- State Senate District 47
