= West Central High School =

West Central High School may refer to:

- West Central High School (Illinois), near Biggsville, Illinois
- West Central High School (Indiana), near Francesville, Indiana
