= Olena, Illinois =

- Unincorporated community
- Location within Illinois Location within the United States
- Coordinates: 40°47′08″N 90°56′20″W
- Country: United States
- State: Illinois
- County: Henderson
- Elevation: 620 ft (190 m)
- Time zone: UTC-6 (Central (CST))
  - Summer (DST): UTC-5 (CDT)
- Area code: 309
- GNIS feature ID: 415078

Olena is an unincorporated community in Stronghurst Township, Henderson County, Illinois, United States. Olena is located on County Route 6, 3.3 miles (5.3 km) north-northwest of Stronghurst.

== History ==
Olena was laid out on August 14, 1838, by Robert Kendall. It had, in the 19th century, a population of approximately 300 inhabitants.
