= Stronghurst Township, Henderson County, Illinois =

Stronghurst Township
- Township
- Location in Henderson County

- Henderson County's location in Illinois
- Coordinates: 40°45′49″N 90°57′49″W
- Country: United States
- State: Illinois
- County: Henderson
- Established: November 6, 1906

Area
  - Total: 35.92 sq mi (93.0 km^{2})
  - Land: 35.92 sq mi (93.0 km^{2})
  - Water: 0 sq mi (0 km^{2}) 0%
- Elevation: 587 ft (179 m)

Population (2020)
  - Total: 1,089
  - Density: 30.32/sq mi (11.71/km^{2})
- Time zone: UTC-6 (CST)
  - Summer (DST): UTC-5 (CDT)
- ZIP codes: 61418, 61425, 61437, 61480
- FIPS code: 17-071-73274

Stronghurst Township is one of eleven townships in Henderson County, Illinois, United States. As of the 2020 census, its population was 1,089 and it contained 510 housing units.

== Geography ==
According to the 2021 census gazetteer files, Stronghurst Township has a total area of 35.92 square miles (93.03 km^{2}), all land.

=== Cities, towns, villages ===
- Stronghurst (west three-quarters)

=== Unincorporated towns ===
- Decorra at 40.727818°N 90.970141°W
- Hopper at 40.785596°N 90.990697°W
- Olena at 40.785595°N 90.938752°W

(This list is based on USGS data and may include former settlements.)

=== Cemeteries ===
The township contains these five cemeteries: Best, Hopper, Maple Grove, Olena and Watson.

=== Major highways ===
- Illinois Route 94

== Demographics ==
As of the 2020 census there were 1,089 people, 391 households, and 294 families residing in the township. The population density was 30.32 inhabitants per square mile (11.71/km^{2}). There were 510 housing units at an average density of 14.20 per square mile (5.48/km^{2}). The racial makeup of the township was 94.95% White, 0.46% African American, 0.09% Native American, 0.46% Asian, 0.00% Pacific Islander, 0.00% from other races, and 4.04% from two or more races. Hispanic or Latino of any race were 1.93% of the population.

There were 391 households, out of which 40.90% had children under the age of 18 living with them, 60.61% were married couples living together, 8.70% had a female householder with no spouse present, and 24.81% were non-families. 22.30% of all households were made up of individuals, and 13.60% had someone living alone who was 65 years of age or older. The average household size was 2.81 and the average family size was 3.27.

The township's age distribution consisted of 31.1% under the age of 18, 9.2% from 18 to 24, 24.1% from 25 to 44, 18.9% from 45 to 64, and 16.7% who were 65 years of age or older. The median age was 35.3 years. For every 100 females, there were 75.6 males. For every 100 females age 18 and over, there were 70.6 males.

The median income for a household in the township was $57,083, and the median income for a family was $72,500. Males had a median income of $40,994 versus $27,500 for females. The per capita income for the township was $21,625. About 4.4% of families and 6.8% of the population were below the poverty line, including 4.8% of those under age 18 and 1.3% of those age 65 or over.

Historical population
Census	Pop.	Note	%±
2000	1,164		—
2010	1,115		−4.2%
2020	1,089		−2.3%
U.S. Decennial Census

== School districts ==
- West Central Community Unit School District 235

== Political districts ==
- Illinois's 17th congressional district
- State House District 94
- State Senate District 47
