= Carman Township, Henderson County, Illinois =

Carman Township
- Township
- Location in Henderson County

- Henderson County's location in Illinois
- Coordinates: 40°45′45″N 91°03′43″W
- Country: United States
- State: Illinois
- County: Henderson
- Established: November 6, 1906

Area
  - Total: 26.36 sq mi (68.3 km^{2})
  - Land: 21.95 sq mi (56.9 km^{2})
  - Water: 4.40 sq mi (11.4 km^{2}) 16.71%
- Elevation: 509 ft (155 m)

Population (2020)
  - Total: 227
  - Density: 10.3/sq mi (3.99/km^{2})
- Time zone: UTC-6 (CST)
  - Summer (DST): UTC-5 (CDT)
- ZIP codes: 61425, 61454
- FIPS code: 17-071-11280

Carman Township is one of eleven townships in Henderson County, Illinois, USA. As of the 2020 census, its population was 227 and it contained 203 housing units.

== Geography ==
According to the 2021 census gazetteer files, Carman Township has a total area of 26.36 square miles (68.27 km^{2}), of which 21.95 square miles (56.85 km^{2}) (or 83.29%) is land and 4.40 square miles (11.40 km^{2}) (or 16.71%) is water.

=== Cities, towns, villages ===
- Gulf Port (south portion)

=== Unincorporated towns ===
- Carman at 40.740596°N 91.059588°W
- Carthage Lake at 40.790595°N 91.075422°W
- Heapsville at 40.759762°N 91.071811°W
- Shokokon at 40.747540°N 91.074311°W
- Yellow Banks at 40.730318°N 91.081255°W

(This list is based on USGS data and may include former settlements.)

=== Extinct towns ===
- Silver Lake at 40.763929°N 91.064311°W

(These towns are listed as "historical" by the USGS.)

=== Cemeteries ===
The township contains Carman Cemetery.

=== Airports and landing strips ===
- Johnson Farm Airport

=== Rivers ===
- Mississippi River

=== Lakes ===
- Brush Lake
- Carthage Lake
- Fish Lake
- Goose Lake
- Lily Lake
- Long Lake
- Millman Lake
- Orchard City Lake
- Rhodes Lake
- Silver Lake

== Demographics ==
As of the 2020 census there were 227 people, 160 households, and 135 families residing in the township. The population density was 8.61 inhabitants per square mile (3.32/km^{2}). There were 203 housing units at an average density of 7.70 per square mile (2.97/km^{2}). The racial makeup of the township was 96.92% White, 0.00% African American, 0.00% Native American, 0.00% Asian, 0.00% Pacific Islander, 0.44% from other races, and 2.64% from two or more races. Hispanic or Latino of any race were 2.20% of the population.

There were 160 households, out of which none had children under the age of 18 living with them, 65.00% were married couples living together, 13.75% had a female householder with no spouse present, and 15.63% were non-families. 15.60% of all households were made up of individuals, and 9.40% had someone living alone who was 65 years of age or older. The average household size was 1.88 and the average family size was 2.04.

The township's age distribution consisted of 0.0% under the age of 18, 0.0% from 18 to 24, 6% from 25 to 44, 65.9% from 45 to 64, and 28.0% who were 65 years of age or older. The median age was 64.2 years. For every 100 females, there were 125.6 males. For every 100 females age 18 and over, there were 125.6 males.

The median income for a household in the township was $44,750, and the median income for a family was $50,781. Males had a median income of $50,536 versus $21,875 for females. The per capita income for the township was $32,985. No of families and 5.0% of the population were below the poverty line, including 17.9% of those age 65 or over.

Historical population
Census	Pop.	Note	%±
2000	378		—
2010	309		−18.3%
2020	227		−26.5%
U.S. Decennial Census

== School districts ==
- West Central Community Unit School District 235

== Political districts ==
- Illinois's 17th congressional district
- State House District 94
- State Senate District 47
