= Sciota Township, McDonough County, Illinois =

Coordinates: 40°35′14″N 90°44′06″W

Sciota Township
- Township
- Location in McDonough County

- McDonough County's location in Illinois
- Country: United States
- State: Illinois
- County: McDonough
- Established: November 4, 1856

Area
  - Total: 37.69 sq mi (97.6 km^{2})
  - Land: 37.69 sq mi (97.6 km^{2})
  - Water: 0 sq mi (0 km^{2}) 0%

Population (2010)
  - Estimate (2016): 514
  - Density: 14.3/sq mi (5.5/km^{2})
- Time zone: UTC-6 (CST)
  - Summer (DST): UTC-5 (CDT)
- FIPS code: 17-109-68211

Sciota Township is located in McDonough County, Illinois. As of the 2010 census, its population was 539 and it contained 248 housing units. The village of Sciota is located in Sciota Township.

== Geography ==
According to the 2010 census, the township has a total area of 37.69 square miles (97.6 km^{2}), all land.

== Demographics ==
Historical population
Census	Pop.	Note	%±
2016 (est.)	514
U.S. Decennial Census
