= Bald Bluff Township, Henderson County, Illinois =

Bald Bluff Township
- Township
- Location in Henderson County

- Henderson County's location in Illinois
- Coordinates: 41°02′12″N 90°51′16″W
- Country: United States
- State: Illinois
- County: Henderson
- Established: November 6, 1906

Area
  - Total: 42.85 sq mi (111.0 km^{2})
  - Land: 42.06 sq mi (108.9 km^{2})
  - Water: 0.79 sq mi (2.0 km^{2}) 1.84%
- Elevation: 640 ft (195 m)

Population (2020)
  - Total: 212
  - Density: 5.04/sq mi (1.95/km^{2})
- Time zone: UTC-6 (CST)
  - Summer (DST): UTC-5 (CDT)
- ZIP codes: 61442, 61453, 61469, 61476
- FIPS code: 17-071-03415

Bald Bluff Township is one of eleven townships in Henderson County, Illinois, USA. As of the 2020 census, its population was 212 and it contained 115 housing units.

== Geography ==
According to the 2021 census gazetteer files, Bald Bluff Township has a total area of 42.85 square miles (110.98 km^{2}), of which 42.06 square miles (108.93 km^{2}) (or 98.16%) is land and 0.79 square miles (2.05 km^{2}) (or 1.84%) is water.

=== Unincorporated towns ===
- Bald Bluff at 41.018648°N 90.853752°W

(This list is based on USGS data and may include former settlements.)

=== Cemeteries ===
The township contains Belmont Cemetery.

=== Airports and landing strips ===
- Earl J Meyer Airport
- Meyer Landing Strip
- Shissler Seed Company Incorporated Airport

== Demographics ==
As of the 2020 census there were 212 people, 49 households, and 18 families residing in the township. The population density was 4.95 inhabitants per square mile (1.91/km^{2}). There were 115 housing units at an average density of 2.68 per square mile (1.03/km^{2}). The racial makeup of the township was 93.40% White, 0.94% African American, 0.00% Native American, 0.47% Asian, 0.00% Pacific Islander, 0.47% from other races, and 4.72% from two or more races. Hispanic or Latino of any race were 0.94% of the population.

There were 49 households, out of which 0.00% had children under the age of 18 living with them, 36.73% were married couples living together, 0.00% had a female householder with no spouse present, and 63.27% were non-families. 63.30% of all households were made up of individuals, and 40.80% had someone living alone who was 65 years of age or older. The average household size was 1.41 and the average family size was 1.78.

The township's age distribution consisted of 0.0% under the age of 18, 0.0% from 18 to 24, 0% from 25 to 44, 34.7% from 45 to 64, and 65.2% who were 65 years of age or older. The median age was 75.0 years. For every 100 females, there were 165.4 males. For every 100 females age 18 and over, there were 165.4 males.

The per capita income for the township was $24,832. No families and 8.7% of the population were below the poverty line.

Historical population
Census	Pop.	Note	%±
2000	288		—
2010	334		16.0%
2020	212		−36.5%
U.S. Decennial Census

== School districts ==
- Aledo Community Unit School District 201
- United Community School District 304
- West Central Community Unit School District 235
- Westmer Community Unit School District 203

== Political districts ==
- Illinois's 17th congressional district
- State House District 94
- State Senate District 47
