= Shokokon, Illinois =

- Unincorporated community
- Location within Illinois Location within the United States
- Coordinates: 40°44′51″N 91°04′28″W
- Country: United States
- State: Illinois
- County: Henderson County
- Township: Carman Township
- Elevation: 528 ft (161 m)
- ZIP code: 61425
- GNIS feature ID: 0418455

Shokokon is an unincorporated community in Carman Township, Henderson County, Illinois, United States.

== History ==
=== Founding ===
A small riverside community located on the riverside of the levee, Shokokon traces its origins to 1836; Shokokon derives its name from the Sauk and Meskwaki name "Shoquoquon" which translates to Flint Hills. Robert McQueen, attracted by the relatively good river access, platted a village of sixteen square blocks. Over several years, a ferry operated from the shores of the town where residents could take the ferry from Shokokon across the river to Iowa.

=== Influences ===
Joseph Smith, founder of the Church of Jesus Christ of Latter-day Saints, considered expanding his base from Nauvoo by establishing another Mormon community at Shokokon in 1843. He visited several times and preached to the local public. However, the plans were abandoned as Smith became embroiled in several conflicts within the surrounding areas in and around Nauvoo.

=== Population ===
The village population never grew larger than 300 residents, and when the Santa Fe railroad bypassed the village it became considerably much smaller.

=== Commerce ===
The majority of the commercial buildings moved several miles southeast to be near the newly built Carthage and Burlington Railroad station at Carman in 1869. There are a few businesses within the township.

=== River and levee system ===
Located within the Pool 19 (also known as Lake Cooper), Shokokon's relationship to the Mississippi River is complex, the levee system is on the opposite side of the township. The United States Army Corps of Engineers designated the township under the Henderson County Drainage District #2. It is estimated that at least 28,000 acres were under water in Henderson County (which Shokokon is located) due to the flooding of 2008.

The township has no protection from flooding.

The township has weathered several historic floods, namely five in the 21st century and the Great Flood of 1993 which left the township underwater for months. Over the township's history, a small number of summer residences have been built in the unincorporated village. The structures are typically elevated high enough to stay dry during most periods of flooding.
