= Guy C. Scott =

American judge (1863–1909)

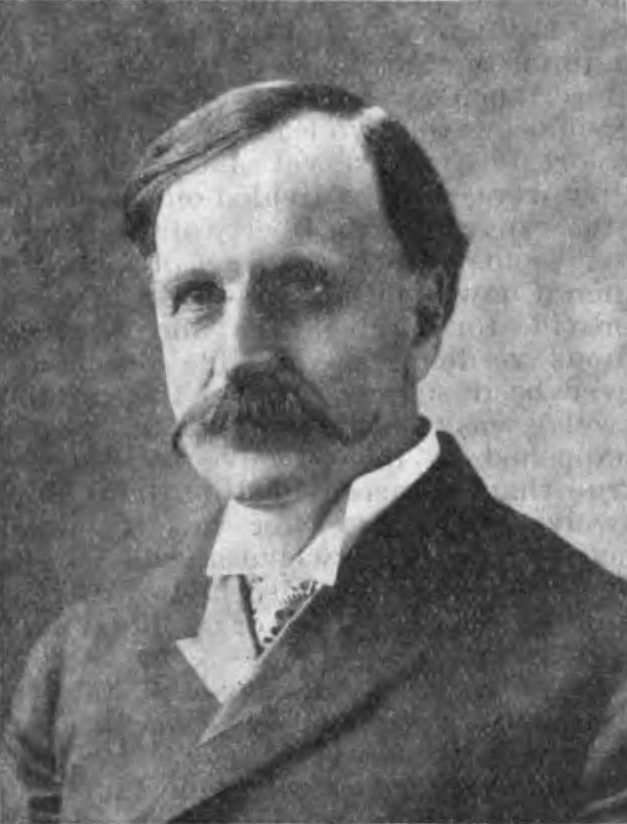
- Scott c. 1906
- Born: August 14, 1863; Bald Bluff, Illinois, U.S.
- Died: May 24, 1909 (aged 45); Galesburg, Illinois, U.S.
- Education: Knox College

Guy C. Scott (August 14, 1863 – May 24, 1909) was an American jurist and politician.

Born in Bald Bluff, Illinois, Scott went to Knox College, in Galesburg, Illinois. He then studied law and was admitted to the Illinois bar. Scott served as deputy county clerk, county clerk for Mercer County, Illinois and as mayor of Aledo, Illinois. Scott was also involved with the Democratic Party. Scott served on the Illinois Supreme Court from 1903 until his death in 1909. He was chief justice. Scott died aged 45 in a hospital in Galesburg, Illinois after surgery following an appendicitis attack.
