= Media Township, Henderson County, Illinois =

Media Township
- Township
- Location in Henderson County

- Henderson County's location in Illinois
- Coordinates: 40°45′56″N 90°50′20″W
- Country: United States
- State: Illinois
- County: Henderson
- Established: November 6, 1906

Area
  - Total: 36.41 sq mi (94.3 km^{2})
  - Land: 36.41 sq mi (94.3 km^{2})
  - Water: 0 sq mi (0 km^{2}) 0%
- Elevation: 712 ft (217 m)

Population (2020)
  - Total: 361
  - Density: 9.91/sq mi (3.83/km^{2})
- Time zone: UTC-6 (CST)
  - Summer (DST): UTC-5 (CDT)
- ZIP codes: 61418, 61460, 61478, 61480
- FIPS code: 17-071-48086

Media Township is one of eleven townships in Henderson County, Illinois, USA. As of the 2020 census, its population was 361 and it contained 182 housing units.

== Geography ==
According to the 2021 census gazetteer files, Media Township has a total area of 36.41 square miles (94.30 km^{2}), all land.

=== Cities, towns, villages ===
- Media
- Stronghurst (east quarter)

=== Cemeteries ===
The township contains these three cemeteries: Adair, Davidson and Walnut Grove.

=== Major highways ===
- Illinois Route 94
- Illinois Route 116

=== Airports and landing strips ===
- Neff Airport

== Demographics ==
As of the 2020 census there were 361 people, 177 households, and 123 families residing in the township. The population density was 9.92 inhabitants per square mile (3.83/km^{2}). There were 182 housing units at an average density of 5.00 per square mile (1.93/km^{2}). The racial makeup of the township was 97.51% White, 0.00% African American, 0.00% Native American, 0.00% Asian, 0.00% Pacific Islander, 0.00% from other races, and 2.49% from two or more races. Hispanic or Latino of any race were 0.83% of the population.

There were 177 households, out of which 24.30% had children under the age of 18 living with them, 64.97% were married couples living together, 4.52% had a female householder with no spouse present, and 30.51% were non-families. 29.40% of all households were made up of individuals, and 23.20% had someone living alone who was 65 years of age or older. The average household size was 2.09 and the average family size was 2.54.

The township's age distribution consisted of 21.9% under the age of 18, 0.8% from 18 to 24, 11.1% from 25 to 44, 37.7% from 45 to 64, and 28.6% who were 65 years of age or older. The median age was 55.0 years. For every 100 females, there were 96.8 males. For every 100 females age 18 and over, there were 124.0 males.

The median income for a household in the township was $63,295, and the median income for a family was $63,472. Males had a median income of $35,556 versus $35,625 for females. The per capita income for the township was $32,522. About 4.9% of families and 8.6% of the population were below the poverty line, including 21.0% of those under age 18 and 1.9% of those age 65 or over.

Historical population
Census	Pop.	Note	%±
2000	478		—
2010	392		−18.0%
2020	361		−7.9%
U.S. Decennial Census

== School districts ==
- West Central Community Unit School District 235

== Political districts ==
- Illinois's 17th congressional district
- State House District 94
- State Senate District 47
