= Bald Bluff, Illinois =

- Unincorporated community
- Location within Illinois Location within the United States
- Coordinates: 41°01′07″N 90°51′14″W
- Country: United States
- State: Illinois
- County: Henderson
- Elevation: 633 ft (193 m)
- Time zone: UTC-6 (Central (CST))
  - Summer (DST): UTC-5 (CDT)
- Area code: 309
- GNIS feature ID: 422428

Bald Bluff (also Baldbluff) is an unincorporated community, in Bald Bluff Township, Henderson County, Illinois, United States.

== Notable people ==
- Guy C. Scott, Chief Justice of the Illinois Supreme Court, was born in Bald Bluff.
