= Big River State Forest =

State forest in Illinois, United States

- IUCN category VI (protected area with sustainable use of natural resources)
- Location within Illinois
- Location: Henderson County, Illinois, USA
- Nearest city: Keithsburg, Illinois
- Coordinates: 41°00′37″N 90°54′45″W
- Area: 2,900 acres (1,174 ha)
- Established: 1925
- Governing body: Illinois Department of Natural Resources

Big River State Forest is a conservation area on 2,900 acres (1,174 ha) in Henderson County, Illinois, United States. The land was first acquired in 1925 as only a 200-acre (81 ha) refuge, but subsequent land purchases raised the total to 2,900 acres (1,200 ha).
