= Terre Haute Township, Henderson County, Illinois =

Terre Haute Township
- Township
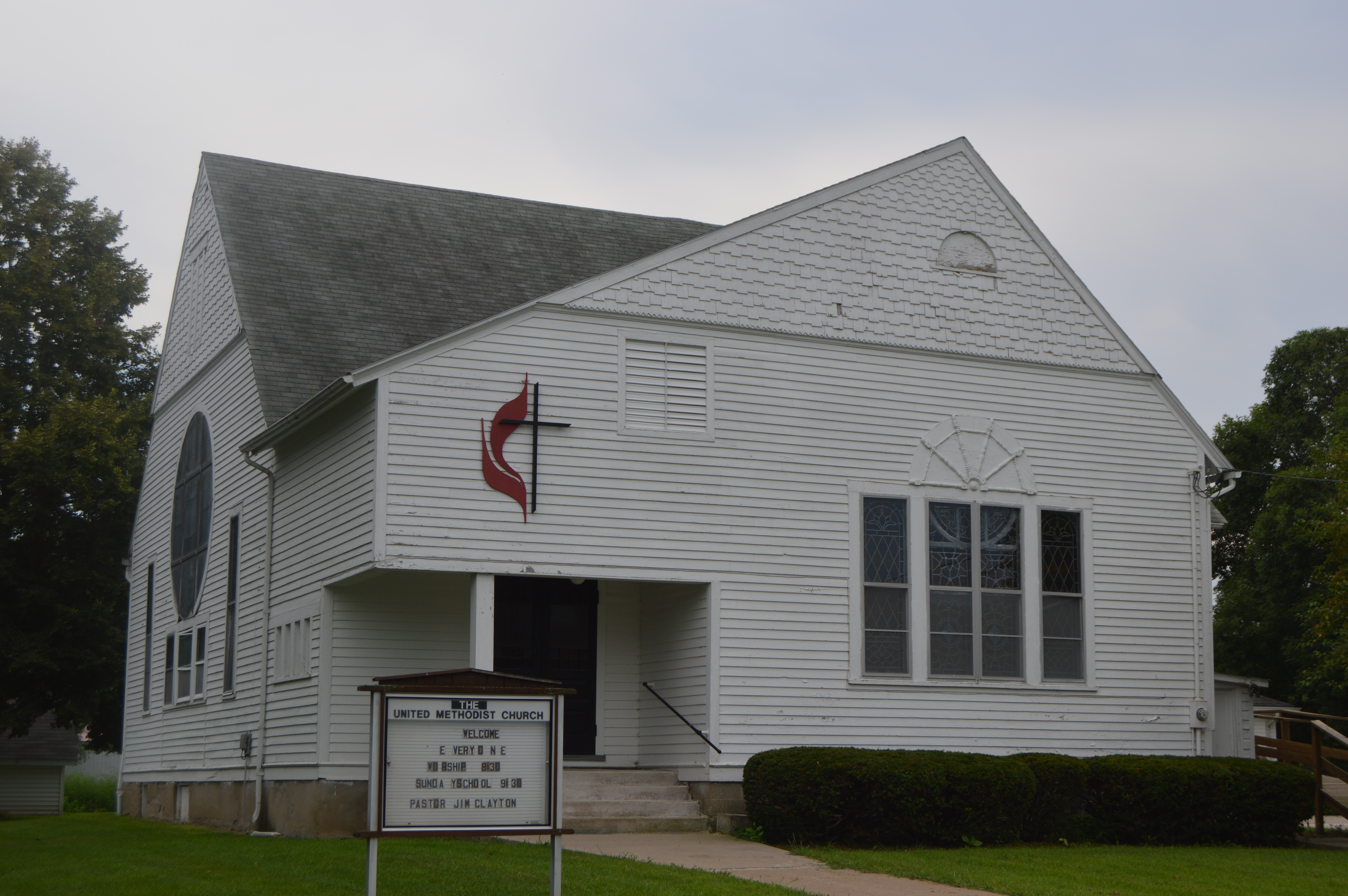
- Terre Haute United Methodist Church

- Location in Henderson County

- Henderson County's location in Illinois
- Coordinates: 40°40′27″N 90°57′42″W
- Country: United States
- State: Illinois
- County: Henderson
- Established: November 6, 1906

Area
  - Total: 35.98 sq mi (93.2 km^{2})
  - Land: 35.96 sq mi (93.1 km^{2})
  - Water: 0.02 sq mi (0.052 km^{2}) 0.06%
- Elevation: 728 ft (222 m)

Population (2020)
  - Total: 227
  - Density: 6.31/sq mi (2.44/km^{2})
- Time zone: UTC-6 (CST)
  - Summer (DST): UTC-5 (CDT)
- ZIP codes: 61425, 61450, 61454, 61480
- FIPS code: 17-071-74730

Terre Haute Township is one of eleven townships in Henderson County, Illinois, USA. As of the 2020 census, its population was 227 and it contained 112 housing units.

== Geography ==
According to the 2021 census gazetteer files, Terre Haute Township has a total area of 35.98 square miles (93.19 km^{2}), of which 35.96 square miles (93.14 km^{2}) (or 99.94%) is land and 0.02 square miles (0.05 km^{2}) (or 0.06%) is water.

=== Unincorporated towns ===
- Terre Haute at 40.66643°N 90.981251°W

(This list is based on USGS data and may include former settlements.)

=== Cemeteries ===
The township contains these two cemeteries: Peasley and Terre Haute.

=== Major highways ===
- Illinois Route 94
- Illinois Route 96

=== Airports and landing strips ===
- Clover Landing Strip

== Demographics ==
As of the 2020 census there were 227 people, 76 households, and 52 families residing in the township. The population density was 6.31 inhabitants per square mile (2.44/km^{2}). There were 112 housing units at an average density of 3.11 per square mile (1.20/km^{2}). The racial makeup of the township was 96.92% White, 0.00% African American, 0.00% Native American, 0.00% Asian, 0.00% Pacific Islander, 0.88% from other races, and 2.20% from two or more races. Hispanic or Latino of any race were 1.32% of the population.

There were 76 households, out of which 7.90% had children under the age of 18 living with them, 60.53% were married couples living together, 7.89% had a female householder with no spouse present, and 31.58% were non-families. 31.60% of all households were made up of individuals, and 14.50% had someone living alone who was 65 years of age or older. The average household size was 2.17 and the average family size was 2.71.

The township's age distribution consisted of 11.5% under the age of 18, 13.3% from 18 to 24, 5.4% from 25 to 44, 32.1% from 45 to 64, and 37.6% who were 65 years of age or older. The median age was 52.0 years. For every 100 females, there were 85.4 males. For every 100 females age 18 and over, there were 97.3 males.

The median income for a household in the township was $62,308, and the median income for a family was $71,786. Males had a median income of $52,566 versus $31,458 for females. The per capita income for the township was $29,628. None of the population was below the poverty line.

Historical population
Census	Pop.	Note	%±
2000	264		—
2010	263		−0.4%
2020	227		−13.7%
U.S. Decennial Census

== School districts ==
- West Central Community Unit School District 235

== Political districts ==
- Illinois's 17th congressional district
- State House District 94
- State Senate District 47
