= Terre Haute, Illinois =

- Unincorporated community
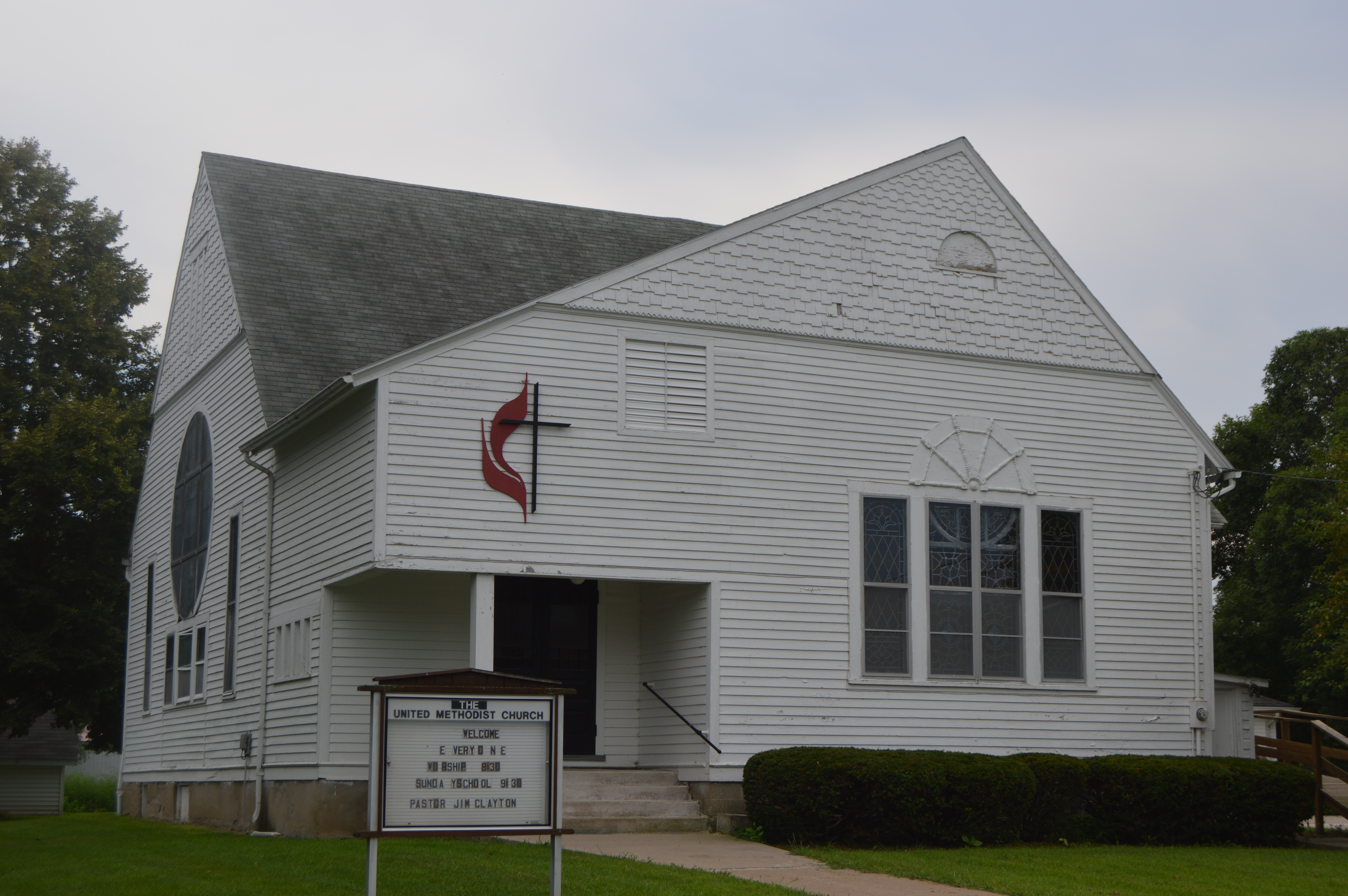
- Methodist church

- Location within Illinois Location within the United States
- Coordinates: 40°39′59″N 90°58′53″W
- Country: United States
- State: Illinois
- County: Henderson County
- Township: Terre Haute Township
- Elevation: 712 ft (217 m)
- ZIP code: 61454
- GNIS feature ID: 0419604

Terre Haute is an unincorporated community in Terre Haute Township, Henderson County, Illinois, United States.
