= Raritan Township, Henderson County, Illinois =

Raritan Township
- Township
- Location in Henderson County

- Henderson County's location in Illinois
- Coordinates: 40°40′45″N 90°50′52″W
- Country: United States
- State: Illinois
- County: Henderson
- Established: November 6, 1906

Area
  - Total: 34.01 sq mi (88.1 km^{2})
  - Land: 34.01 sq mi (88.1 km^{2})
  - Water: 0 sq mi (0 km^{2}) 0%
- Elevation: 741 ft (226 m)

Population (2020)
  - Total: 242
  - Density: 7.12/sq mi (2.75/km^{2})
- Time zone: UTC-6 (CST)
  - Summer (DST): UTC-5 (CDT)
- ZIP codes: 61420, 61460, 61471, 61480
- FIPS code: 17-071-62861

Raritan Township is one of eleven townships in Henderson County, Illinois, USA. As of the 2020 census, its population was 242 and it contained 120 housing units.

== Geography ==
According to the 2021 census gazetteer files, Raritan Township has a total area of 34.01 square miles (88.09 km^{2}), all land.

=== Cities, towns, villages ===
- Raritan

=== Cemeteries ===
The township contains two cemeteries: Raritan and Saint Patrick's.

== Demographics ==
As of the 2020 census there were 242 people, 58 households, and 48 families residing in the township. The population density was 7.12 inhabitants per square mile (2.75/km^{2}). There were 120 housing units at an average density of 3.53 per square mile (1.36/km^{2}). The racial makeup of the township was 99.17% White, 0.00% African American, 0.00% Native American, 0.00% Asian, 0.00% Pacific Islander, 0.00% from other races, and 0.83% from two or more races. Hispanic or Latino of any race were 0.00% of the population.

There were 58 households, out of which 25.90% had children under the age of 18 living with them, 70.69% were married couples living together, 12.07% had a female householder with no spouse present, and 17.24% were non-families. 15.50% of all households were made up of individuals, and 13.80% had someone living alone who was 65 years of age or older. The average household size was 2.50 and the average family size was 2.71.

The township's age distribution consisted of 28.3% under the age of 18, 0.7% from 18 to 24, 18.7% from 25 to 44, 22.8% from 45 to 64, and 29.7% who were 65 years of age or older. The median age was 46.6 years. For every 100 females, there were 66.7 males. For every 100 females age 18 and over, there were 76.3 males.

The median income for a household in the township was $58,750, and the median income for a family was $46,500. Males had a median income of $70,179 versus $23,889 for females. The per capita income for the township was $28,274. None of the population was below the poverty line.

Historical population
Census	Pop.	Note	%±
2000	340		—
2010	286		−15.9%
2020	242		−15.4%
U.S. Decennial Census

== School districts ==
- West Central Community Unit School District 235
- West Prairie Community Unit School District 103

== Political districts ==
- Illinois's 17th congressional district
- State House District 94
- State Senate District 47
