= Raritan, Illinois =

- Village
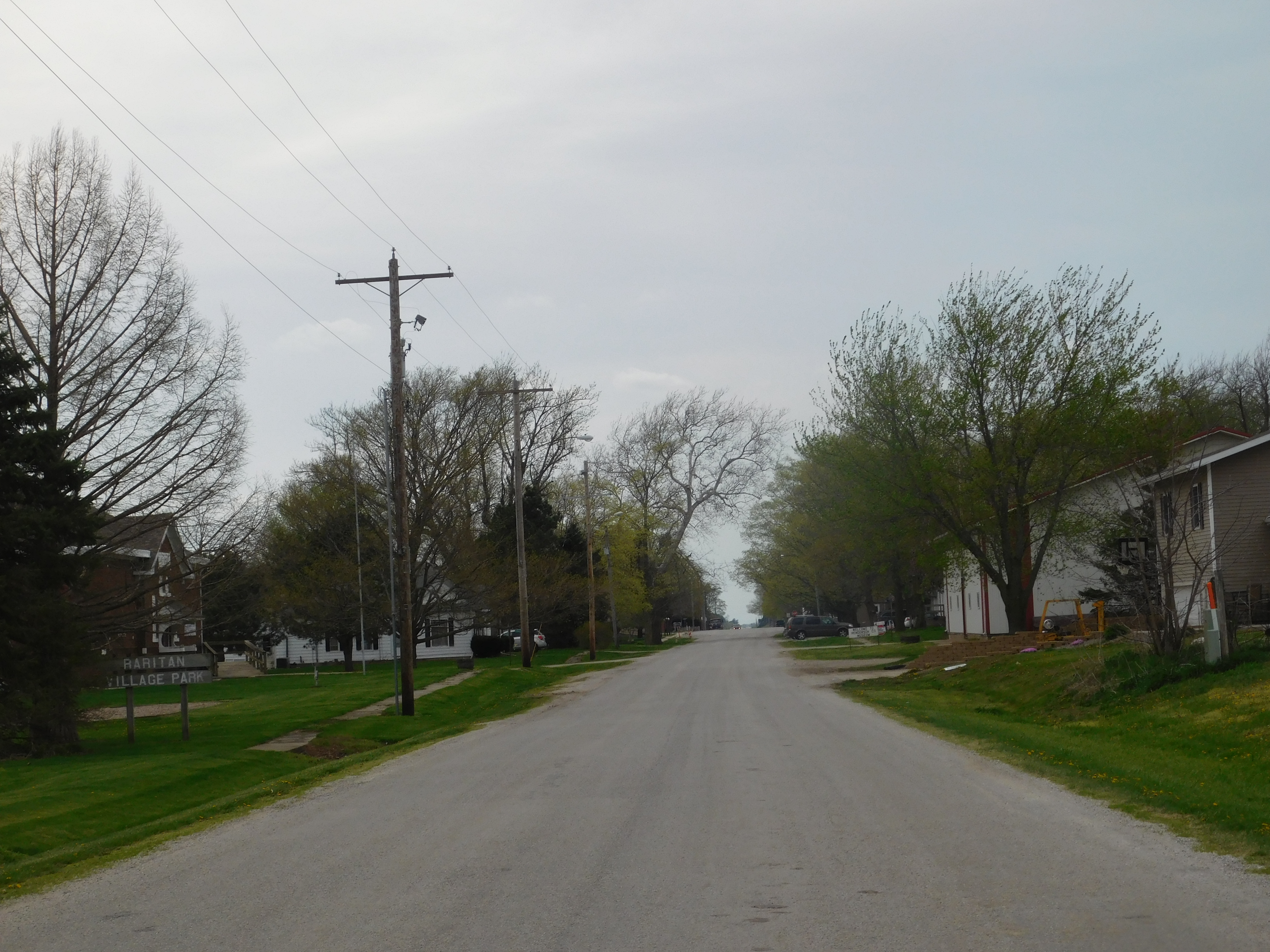
- The village of Raritan along its main street, 400 N in April 2017

- Location of Raritan in Henderson County, Illinois.

- Location of Illinois in the United States
- Coordinates: 40°41′45″N 90°49′30″W
- Country: United States
- State: Illinois
- County: Henderson
- Township: Raritan

Area
  - Total: 0.097 sq mi (0.25 km^{2})
  - Land: 0.097 sq mi (0.25 km^{2})
  - Water: 0 sq mi (0.00 km^{2})
- Elevation: 761 ft (232 m)

Population (2020)
  - Total: 102
  - Density: 1,073.2/sq mi (414.35/km^{2})
- Time zone: UTC-6 (CST)
  - Summer (DST): UTC-5 (CDT)
- ZIP Code(s): 61471
- Area code: 309
- FIPS code: 17-62848
- GNIS feature ID: 2399045
- Wikimedia Commons: Raritan, Illinois

Raritan is a village in Henderson County, Illinois, United States. The population was 102 at the 2020 census. It is part of the Burlington, IA–IL Micropolitan Statistical Area.

== History ==
=== Founding of the village ===
Raritan was founded by settlers of Dutch Reformed Church who originated from Raritan, New Jersey.

"In the southeast corner of Henderson county, the village of Raritan began in 1856 when a group of immigrants of the Dutch Reformed denomination from New Jersey came to what was then called Bedford Precinct. Since many of the settlers came from New Jersey towns located along the Raritan River, it was only natural for them to name their new community after the land they left behind."

== Geography ==
Raritan is located in southeastern Henderson County.

According to the 2021 census gazetteer files, Raritan has a total area of 0.10 square miles (0.26 km^{2}), all land.

=== Tornado outbreak of 1995 ===
Raritan was hit with an F4 tornado in May 1995.

== Demographics ==
Historical population
Census	Pop.	Note	%±
1860	42		—
1870	201		378.6%
1960	182		—
1970	206		13.2%
1980	177		−14.1%
1990	146		−17.5%
2000	140		−4.1%
2010	138		−1.4%
2020	102		−26.1%
U.S. Decennial Census

As of the 2020 census there were 102 people, 43 households, and 40 families residing in the village. The population density was 1,073.68 inhabitants per square mile (414.55/km^{2}). There were 56 housing units at an average density of 589.47 per square mile (227.60/km^{2}). The racial makeup of the village was 100.00% White, 0.00% African American, 0.00% Native American, 0.00% Asian, 0.00% Pacific Islander, 0.00% from other races, and 0.00% from two or more races. Hispanic or Latino of any race were 0.00% of the population.

There were 43 households, out of which 34.9% had children under the age of 18 living with them, 76.74% were married couples living together, 16.28% had a female householder with no husband present, and 6.98% were non-families. 4.65% of all households were made up of individuals, and 2.33% had someone living alone who was 65 years of age or older. The average household size was 2.88 and the average family size was 2.86.

The village's age distribution consisted of 33.3% under the age of 18, 0.8% from 18 to 24, 22% from 25 to 44, 26.9% from 45 to 64, and 17.1% who were 65 years of age or older. The median age was 36.4 years. For every 100 females, there were 70.8 males. For every 100 females age 18 and over, there were 86.4 males.

The median income for a household in the village was $64,464, and the median income for a family was $58,750. Males had a median income of $70,179 versus $23,889 for females. The per capita income for the village was $29,183. None of the population was below the poverty line.
