= Gulfport, Illinois =

Gulfport, Illinois Gulf Port
- Village
- Location of Gulfport in Henderson County, Illinois.
- Coordinates: 40°48′31″N 91°05′04″W
- Country: United States
- State: Illinois
- County: Henderson
- Townships: Gladstone, Carman

Area
  - Total: 2.29 sq mi (5.94 km^{2})
  - Land: 1.41 sq mi (3.66 km^{2})
  - Water: 0.88 sq mi (2.29 km^{2})
- Elevation: 518 ft (158 m)

Population (2020)
  - Total: 42
  - Density: 33.3/sq mi (12.85/km^{2})
- Time zone: UTC-6 (CST)
  - Summer (DST): UTC-5 (CDT)
- ZIP Code(s): 61425
- Area code: 309
- FIPS code: 17-31992
- GNIS feature ID: 2398216

Gulfport is a village in Henderson County, Illinois, United States. As of the 2020 census, the village population was 42, down from 54 at the 2010 census. It is part of the Burlington, IA–IL Micropolitan Statistical Area. The village was completely submerged, save the roofs of some homes and buildings, by a levee break during the flood of 2008.

== Geography ==
Gulfport is located on the western edge of Henderson County. It is bordered to the west by the Mississippi River, which is also the state boundary with Iowa. U.S. Route 34 passes through the village, crossing the Mississippi via the Great River Bridge to Burlington, Iowa. To the east US 34 leads 27 miles (43 km) to Monmouth and 44 miles (71 km) to Galesburg.

According to the 2021 census gazetteer files, Gulfport has a total area of 2.30 square miles (5.96 km^{2}), of which 1.41 square miles (3.65 km^{2}) (or 61.53%) is land and 0.88 square miles (2.28 km^{2}) (or 38.47%) is water.

== Demographics ==
Historical population
Census	Pop.	Note	%±
1930	126		—
1940	174		38.1%
1950	232		33.3%
1960	214		−7.8%
1970	220		2.8%
1980	224		1.8%
1990	209		−6.7%
2000	207		−1.0%
2010	54		−73.9%
2020	42		−22.2%
U.S. Decennial Census

As of the 2020 census there were 42 people, 22 households, and 20 families residing in the village. The population density was 18.30 inhabitants per square mile (7.07/km^{2}). There were 34 housing units at an average density of 14.81 per square mile (5.72/km^{2}). The racial makeup of the village was 85.71% White, 0.00% African American, 0.00% Native American, 2.38% Asian, 0.00% Pacific Islander, 0.00% from other races, and 11.90% from two or more races. Hispanic or Latino of any race were 4.76% of the population.

There were 22 households, none of which had children under the age of 18 living with them, 90.91% were married couples living together, none had a female householder with no husband present, and 9.09% were non-families. 9.09% of all households were made up of individuals, and 9.09% had someone living alone who was 65 years of age or older. The average household size was 1.95 and the average family size was 1.86.

The village's age distribution consisted of 0.0% under the age of 18, 2.4% from 18 to 24, 12.2% from 25 to 44, 58.6% from 45 to 64, and 26.8% who were 65 years of age or older. The median age was 58.5 years. For every 100 females, there were 141.2 males. For every 100 females age 18 and over, there were 141.2 males.

The median income for a household in the village was $85,357, and the median income for a family was $85,714. Males had a median income of $70,833 versus $15,000 for females. The per capita income for the village was $39,161. None of the population was below the poverty line.
