= Decorra, Illinois =

- Unincorporated community
- Location within Illinois Location within the United States
- Coordinates: 40°43′40″N 90°58′13″W
- Country: United States
- State: Illinois
- County: Henderson
- Elevation: 682 ft (208 m)
- Time zone: UTC-6 (Central (CST))
  - Summer (DST): UTC-5 (CDT)
- Area code: 309
- GNIS feature ID: 422609

Decorra is an unincorporated community in Henderson County, in the U.S. state of Illinois.

== History ==
Decorra was founded in the 1880s when the railroad was extended to that point. A post office was established at Decorra in 1888, and remained in operation until 1929.

== Transportation ==
Amtrak’s Southwest Chief, which operates between Los Angeles and Chicago, passes through the town on BNSF tracks, but makes no stop. A station is located in Fort Madison, 23 miles (37 km) to the southwest. The California Zephyr has a stop located in Burlington, which is 14 miles (23 km) to the northwest.
