= Sciota, Illinois =

Sciota, Illinois Amicus, Clarkesville
- Village
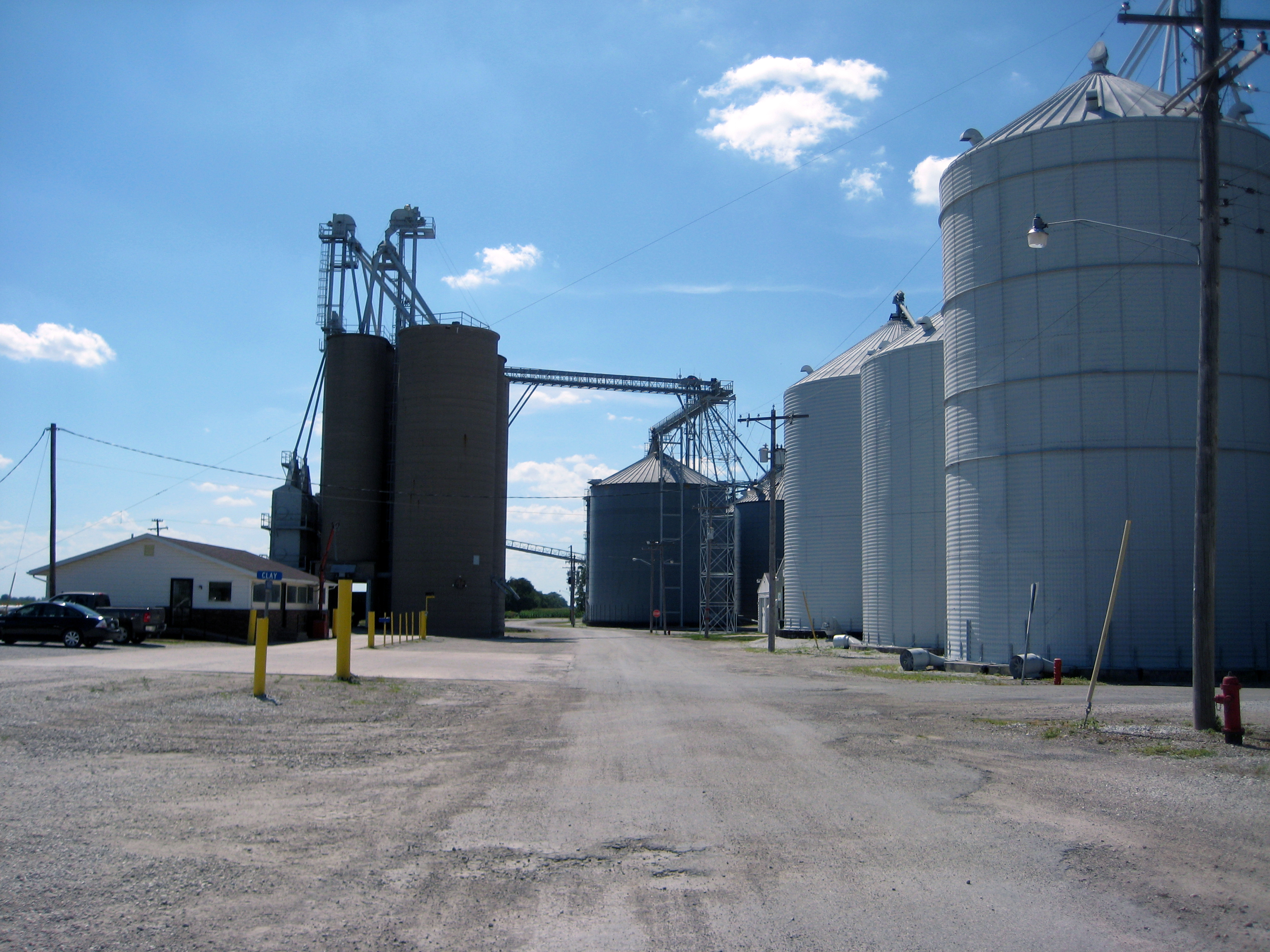
- Farmers Elevator Company in Sciota, 2013
- Etymology: Named for Sciota Township
- Location in McDonough County, Illinois
- Coordinates: 40°33′44″N 90°45′03″W
- Country: United States
- State: Illinois
- County: McDonough
- Township: Sciota
- Founded: 1867

Government
  - Type: Village

Area
  - Total: 0.31 sq mi (0.81 km^{2})
  - Land: 0.31 sq mi (0.81 km^{2})
  - Water: 0 sq mi (0.00 km^{2})
- Elevation: 758 ft (231 m)

Population (2020)
  - Total: 38
  - Density: 121.7/sq mi (46.98/km^{2})
- Time zone: UTC-6 (CST)
  - Summer (DST): UTC-5 (CDT)
- ZIP code: 61475
- Area code: 309
- FIPS code: 17-68198
- GNIS feature ID: 2399774

Sciota /saɪˈoʊdə/ is a village in McDonough County, Illinois, United States. The population was 38 at the 2020 census, down from 61 in 2010.

== History ==
Sciota was laid out in September 1867 by William B. Clarke and was called "Clarkesville" in his honor. Another town in Illinois already had been named Clarksville (without the "e"), so when the new town's post office was established on February 7, 1868, it was called "Amicus". This discrepancy between town name and post office name led the residents to change both names to "Sciota", after the township in which the town lies. (Sciota Township was named after the Scioto River in Ohio.) The Illinois General Assembly approved the name change on March 29, 1869.

A Christian church was erected in 1869, a Baptist church in 1871, and a school building in 1872.

In 1878, Sciota was the largest grain market in McDonough County. At that time, the primary crops were corn and oats; now, the village is surrounded by fields of corn and soybeans.

A newspaper, The Sciota Sentinel, was published by H. C. Harl around 1895, but only one issue seems to have survived (October 17, 1895, no. 49).

== Geography ==
Sciota is located in northern McDonough County 0.5 miles (0.8 km) north of Illinois Route 9 and 10 miles (16 km) northwest of Macomb, the county seat.

According to the U.S. Census Bureau, Sciota has a total area of 0.31 square miles (0.80 km^{2}), all land. It is situated east of the headwaters of an unnamed tributary of Spring Creek, itself a tributary of the East Fork of the La Moine River, part of the Illinois River watershed.

The village of Sciota lies in an area of prime farmland with soil classified as Mollisols.

== Demographics ==
Historical population
Census	Pop.	Note	%±
1880	349		—
1890	238		−31.8%
1900	238		0.0%
1910	160		−32.8%
1920	195		21.9%
1930	150		−23.1%
1940	156		4.0%
1950	128		−17.9%
1960	120		−6.2%
1970	101		−15.8%
1980	81		−19.8%
1990	68		−16.0%
2000	58		−14.7%
2010	61		5.2%
2020	38		−37.7%
U.S. Decennial Census

As of the 2010 census, there were 61 people, 26 households, and 12 families residing in the village. The racial makeup of the village was 100.00% White.

== Transportation and infrastructure ==
Sciota is accessible by public roads from the south via McDonough County road East 800th Street (County Highway 13) which intersects with Illinois Route 9 1/2 mile south of the village. East 800th Street is called Buel Street within the village proper and extends north to the county line.

Sciota is served by the Keokuk Junction Railway. As of January 2010, there were two rail sidings. There is one grade crossing protected by a pair of crossbucks with flashing lights and a mechanical warning bell (no gates).

The village received a state grant of $400,000 in 2001 to connect to the Good Hope water supply system and to build a water tower. While Sciota has a water supply system, it does not have a sanitary sewer system; residents rely on septic systems for sewage disposal.

== Education ==
It is home to West Prairie Community Unit School District 103. Students attend elementary school at North Elementary in Good Hope. West Prairie High School was located in Sciota and is now located in Colchester.
