= Oquawka, Illinois =

Oquawka Oquawkiek (Sauk and Meskwaki peoples)
- Village
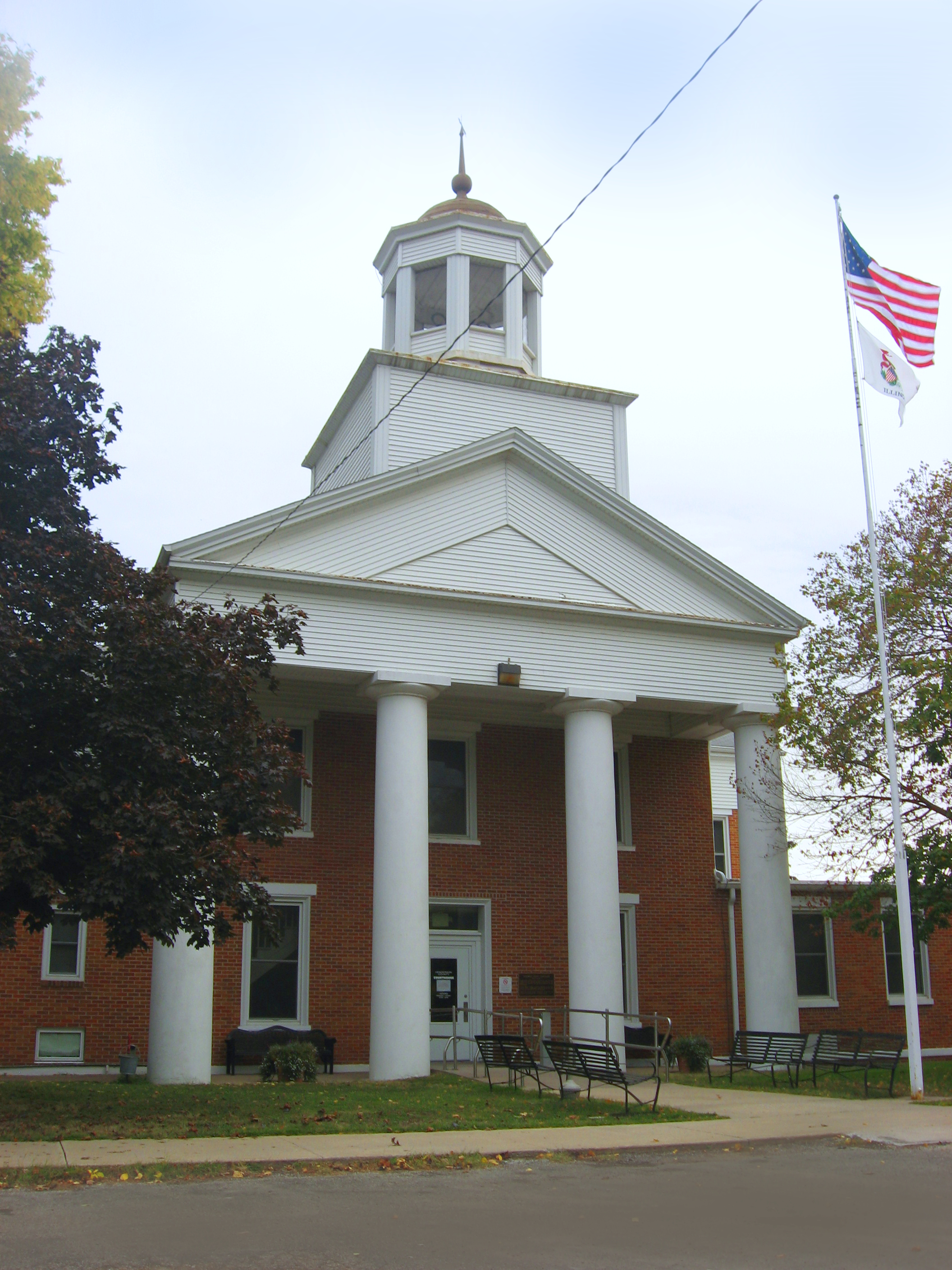
- Henderson County Courthouse
- Interactive map of Oquawka
- Location within Illinois Location within the United States
- Coordinates: 40°56′16″N 90°56′59″W
- Country: United States
- State: Illinois
- County: Henderson
- Township: Oquawka
- Seat: County

Area
  - Total: 1.86 sq mi (4.82 km^{2})
  - Land: 1.47 sq mi (3.80 km^{2})
  - Water: 0.39 sq mi (1.01 km^{2})
- Elevation: 551 ft (168 m)

Population (2020)
  - Total: 1,134
  - Density: 772.0/sq mi (298.08/km^{2})
- Time zone: UTC-6 (CST)
  - Summer (DST): UTC-5 (CDT)
- ZIP Code(s): 61469
- Area code: 309
- FIPS code: 17-56237
- GNIS feature ID: 2399579
- Wikimedia Commons: Oquawka, Illinois
- Website: villageoquawka.wordpress.com

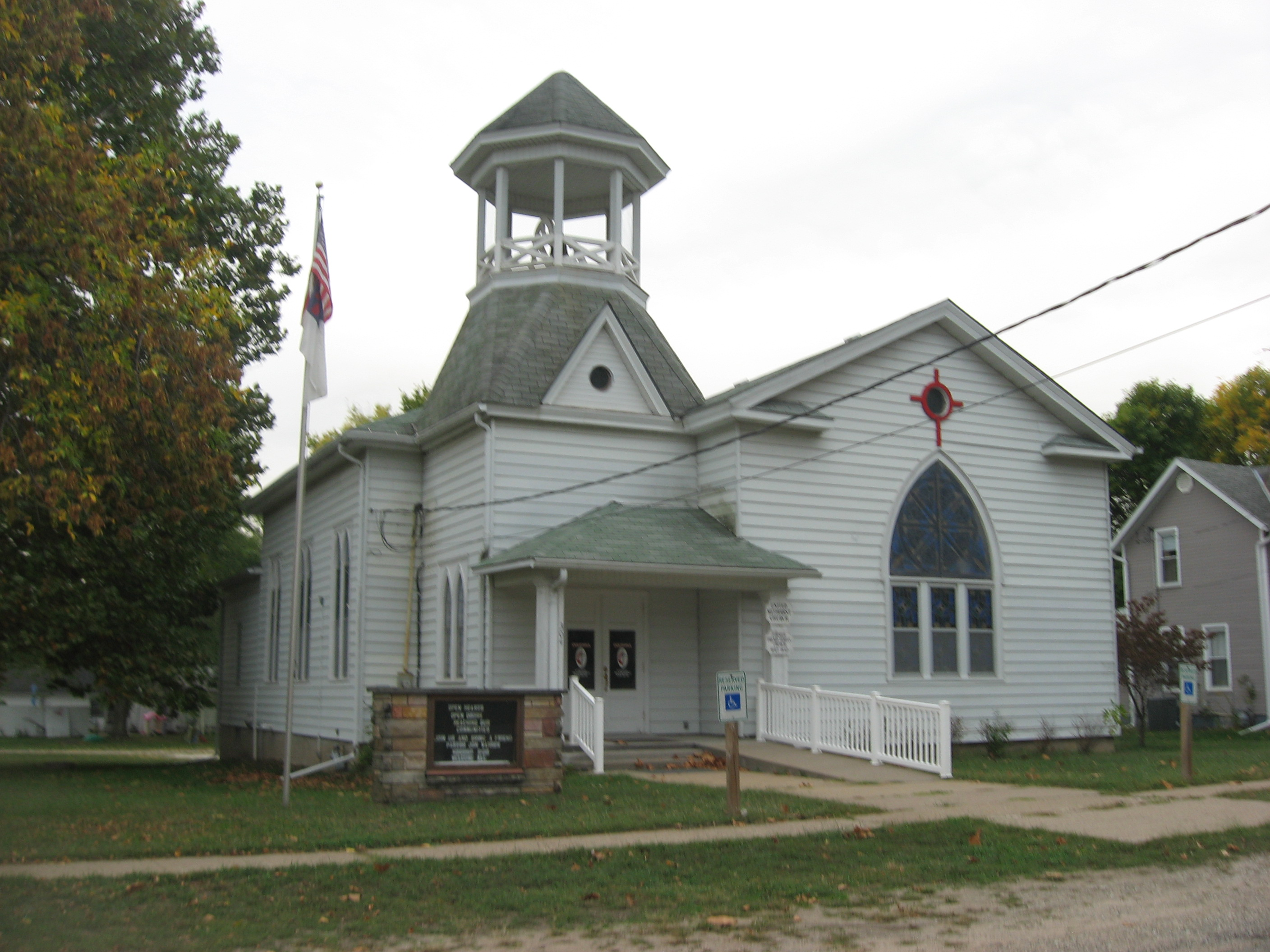
Front and northern side of the Oquawka United Methodist Church, located on the northeastern corner of the intersection of Third and Knox Streets in Oquawka, Illinois (2013).

Oquawka is a village and the county seat of Henderson County, Illinois, United States. The population was 1,134 at the 2020 census. Oquawka is part of the Burlington micropolitan area.

== History ==
The Sauk and Meskwaki peoples once thrived on flatlands that gently fold into the Mississippi River. They called the area Oquawkiek, meaning “yellow banks.” White settlers arrived and kept the peace, thanks to Stephen S. Phelps, the founder of the village of Oquawka, who harbored respect for the native peoples. Phelps would befriend Abraham Lincoln, who was said to spend a lot of time visiting Oquawka. Here, long before his presidency, Lincoln supposedly met Jefferson Davis, then a faithful officer with the U.S. Army. In 1858, Lincoln made a stump speech here, as did his rival and another Phelps family friend, Stephen Douglas, the first circuit judge in this seat of Henderson County.

That period saw the peak of commerce in Oquawka, as a mill and shipping concern. Civic leaders saw great promise for growth, but—in a familiar story from the 19th century—that went to the wayside when railroads went elsewhere. Still, Oquawka survives well as a village, with 1,134 residents and a half-shuttered downtown that supports locals as well as visiting boaters. In fact, east-west Illinois Route 164 stops in—not at, but in—the river, where the pavement slopes into the waterway to accommodate boat trailers.

=== Norma Jean ===
On July 17, 1972, a circus was in town. The main attraction of the Clark & Walter Circus was a 29-year-old elephant named Norma Jean. History records little of her background, except that she was born in the U.S. She was an Asian elephant, which have smaller ears and bodies than the African variety, and weighed 6,500 pounds (2,900 kg).

As nightfall approached, head elephant caretaker "Possum Red" tethered Norma Jean to a tree at the village park in the center of town, using a metal chain. Not long after, in rolled storm clouds. A bolt of lightning ripped through the sky and found Norma Jean's tree—the only one in the park. The voltage fired through the tree, along the metal chain, and into Norma Jean. Possum Red, who was still on the scene, was thrown 30 feet (10 m) by the electrical blast. Norma Jean thudded to the ground, lifeless. Possum Red and the rest of the circus scurried out of town. The following year, without its lone elephant—uninsured and worth the then-princely sum of $10,000—the circus folded.

Townsfolk used a backhoe to dig a 12-foot (3.7 m) hole, rolled the three-ton-plus pachyderm corpse into the grave and marked it with a plywood sign. After town druggist Wade Meloan had raised enough money to erect a memorial, he and a mason friend rounded up two tons of rock and cemented together a 5 feet (1.5 m) tall wall stretching 12 feet (3.7 m) over the grave. Atop the monument, they secured a concrete elephant statue and ringed the wall with flowers. They affixed a glass case to the wall with newspaper accounts about Norma Jean. The plaque on the wall proclaims:

“Norma Jean Elephant, Aug. 10, 1942 to July 17, 1972. This memorial is dedicated in memory of an elephant named Norma Jean, who was killed by lightning at this location and lies buried here.”

When they finished they invited hundreds of well-wishers to the dedication. They even rented a baby elephant to carry a wreath in its trunk to lay at the marker. Meloan became something of a sideshow barker for Norma Jean. He printed professional postcards of the memorial, selling them in Oquawka and beyond to drum up tourism. When reporters came calling, he'd gush over the lore of Norma Jean.

John Behnke, a graduate student from Southern Illinois University's cinema program, filmed a 15-minute documentary on the marker, which later appeared on the television network Showtime. By the mid-1990s, the site averaged two visitors a day. Tourism would get a boost when Oquawka would host a yearly fest to honor Norma Jean, with an elephant walk, white elephant sale and a bake sale featuring "elephant ears".

Meloan, Norma Jean's biggest supporter, died in 2004. Norma Jean has gone from a headline to a footnote. Hardly anyone stops by the grave anymore. A few years ago, unknown vandals destroyed the original elephant atop the memorial. The village got a replacement, but locals otherwise no longer pay much notice to the grave.

=== 1993 Flood ===
During the month of July, The Flood of 1993 turned Oquawka into an island. There was no getting in, and no getting out. Oquawka, which sits above the Mississippi, for the most part stayed dry. The roads did not. Due to flash flooding of all the creeks, the town was cut off from the outside world for at least a day and a half.

=== 2008 Flood ===
On the early morning of June 14, the town of Oquawka was evacuated, due to a levee breach along the swollen Iowa River. The city council believed this would affect the flood waters in the already flooding Mississippi River. The same day, two levees broke near the town of Keithsburg, Illinois, flooding the entire town.

== Geography ==
According to the 2021 census gazetteer files, Oquawka has a total area of 1.86 square miles (4.82 km^{2}), of which 1.47 square miles (3.81 km^{2}) (or 78.98%) is land and 0.39 square miles (1.01 km^{2}) (or 21.02%) is water.

== Demographics ==
Historical population
Census	Pop.	Note	%±
1850	553		—
1860	1,641		196.7%
1870	1,370		−16.5%
1900	1,010		—
1910	907		−10.2%
1920	888		−2.1%
1930	777		−12.5%
1940	912		17.4%
1950	929		1.9%
1960	1,090		17.3%
1970	1,352		24.0%
1980	1,533		13.4%
1990	1,442		−5.9%
2000	1,539		6.7%
2010	1,371		−10.9%
2020	1,134		−17.3%
U.S. Decennial Census

=== 2020 census ===
As of the 2020 census, Oquawka had a population of 1,134. The median age was 50.2 years. 17.4% of residents were under the age of 18 and 25.5% of residents were 65 years of age or older. For every 100 females, there were 93.8 males, and for every 100 females age 18 and over, there were 91.6 males age 18 and over.

0.0% of residents lived in urban areas, while 100.0% lived in rural areas.

There were 533 households in Oquawka, of which 17.6% had children under the age of 18 living in them. Of all households, 40.3% were married-couple households, 22.1% were households with a male householder and no spouse or partner present, and 28.1% were households with a female householder and no spouse or partner present. About 39.4% of all households were made up of individuals and 18.1% had someone living alone who was 65 years of age or older.

The population density was 609.68 inhabitants per square mile (235.40/km^{2}). There were 621 housing units at an average density of 333.87 per square mile (128.91/km^{2}), of which 14.2% were vacant. The homeowner vacancy rate was 0.7% and the rental vacancy rate was 15.8%.

Racial composition as of the 2020 census
Race	Number	Percent
White	1,043	92.0%
Black or African American	16	1.4%
American Indian and Alaska Native	2	0.2%
Asian	5	0.4%
Native Hawaiian and Other Pacific Islander	4	0.4%
Some other race	10	0.9%
Two or more races	54	4.8%
Hispanic or Latino (of any race)	25	2.2%

=== Income and poverty ===
The median income for a household in the village was $40,898, and the median income for a family was $55,650. Males had a median income of $32,125 versus $29,531 for females. The per capita income for the village was $21,993. About 10.3% of families and 12.0% of the population were below the poverty line, including 15.5% of those under age 18 and 4.1% of those age 65 or over.

== Notable people ==
- Charles Lincoln Edwards, zoologist
- Todd Hamilton, PGA pro golfer, 2004 PGA Tour Rookie of the Year
- Charles M. Harris, U.S. Representative, Illinois 4th district (1863–1865)
- James McKinney, U.S. Representative, Illinois 14th District (1905–1913)
- Joyce Ricketts, AAGPBL pro baseball player (1953–1954)

== Attractions ==
- Delabar State Park
