= Carthage Lake, Illinois =

- Unincorporated community
- Location within Illinois Location within the United States
- Coordinates: 40°47′26″N 91°04′32″W
- Country: United States
- State: Illinois
- County: Henderson
- Elevation: 522 ft (159 m)
- Time zone: UTC-6 (Central (CST))
  - Summer (DST): UTC-5 (CDT)
- Area code: 309
- GNIS feature ID: 422531

Carthage Lake is an unincorporated community in Henderson County, Illinois, United States.
