= Media, Illinois =

- Village
- Location of Media in Henderson County, Illinois.

- Location of Illinois in the United States
- Coordinates: 40°46′10″N 90°49′58″W
- Country: United States
- State: Illinois
- County: Henderson
- Township: Media
- Founded: 1887
- Founded by: Nathan Wever

Area
  - Total: 1.70 sq mi (4.40 km^{2})
  - Land: 1.70 sq mi (4.40 km^{2})
  - Water: 0 sq mi (0.00 km^{2})
- Elevation: 712 ft (217 m)

Population (2020)
  - Total: 121
  - Density: 71.3/sq mi (27.52/km^{2})
- Time zone: UTC-6 (CST)
  - Summer (DST): UTC-5 (CDT)
- ZIP Code(s): 61460
- Area code: 309
- FIPS code: 17-48073
- GNIS feature ID: 2399304
- Wikimedia Commons: Media, Illinois

Media is a village in Henderson County, Illinois, United States. The population was 121 at the 2020 census, up from 107 at the 2010 census. It is part of the Burlington, IA–IL Micropolitan Statistical Area.

== Origin of the village name ==
According to the common theory, the name of the village originated from the fact that the town is situated halfway between Chicago and Kansas City on the Santa Fe Railroad.

== Geography ==
Media is located in southeastern Henderson County. Illinois Route 116 passes through the village, leading west and north 9 miles (14 km) to U.S. Route 34 near Biggsville, and south and east 11 miles (18 km) to Roseville.

According to the 2021 census gazetteer files, Media has a total area of 1.70 square miles (4.40 km^{2}), all land.

== Demographics ==
Historical population
Census	Pop.	Note	%±
1910	226		—
1920	170		−24.8%
1930	194		14.1%
1940	187		−3.6%
1950	148		−20.9%
1960	165		11.5%
1970	180		9.1%
1980	179		−0.6%
1990	146		−18.4%
2000	130		−11.0%
2010	107		−17.7%
2020	121		13.1%
U.S. Decennial Census

As of the 2020 census there were 121 people, 46 households, and 38 families residing in the village. The population density was 71.26 inhabitants per square mile (27.51/km^{2}). There were 58 housing units at an average density of 34.16 per square mile (13.19/km^{2}). The racial makeup of the village was 95.87% White, 0.00% African American, 0.00% Native American, 0.00% Asian, 0.00% Pacific Islander, 0.00% from other races, and 4.13% from two or more races. Hispanic or Latino of any race were 0.00% of the population.

There were 46 households, out of which 32.6% had children under the age of 18 living with them, 65.22% were married couples living together, 17.39% had a female householder with no husband present, and 17.39% were non-families. 17.39% of all households were made up of individuals, and 2.17% had someone living alone who was 65 years of age or older. The average household size was 2.66 and the average family size was 2.39.

The village's age distribution consisted of 26.4% under the age of 18, 1.8% from 18 to 24, 17.2% from 25 to 44, 43.6% from 45 to 64, and 10.9% who were 65 years of age or older. The median age was 51.1 years. For every 100 females, there were 80.3 males. For every 100 females age 18 and over, there were 92.9 males.

The median income for a household in the village was $63,864, and the median income for a family was $63,611. Males had a median income of $39,167 versus $37,500 for females. The per capita income for the village was $25,797. About 15.8% of families and 25.5% of the population were below the poverty line, including 58.6% of those under age 18 and none of those age 65 or over.

== Transportation ==
Amtrak’s Southwest Chief, which operates between Los Angeles and Chicago, passes through the town on BNSF tracks, but makes no stop. A station is located in Galesburg, 34 miles (55 km) to the northeast. The California Zephyr has a stop located in Burlington, which is 18 miles (29 km) to the west.
