= Avon High School (Illinois) =

Public school in Fulton County, Illinois, US

Location
- 320 East Wood Street; Avon, Fulton County, Illinois 61415; United States; 40°39′53″N 90°25′47″W

Information
- Type: Comprehensive Public High School
- School district: Avon Community Unit School District 176
- Principal: Tina Stier
- Grades: 9–12
- Enrollment: 73
- Campus type: Rural, village
- Colors: Red, White, Blue
- Athletics conference: Prairieland
- Team name: Spartans
- PSAE average: 62%
- Feeder schools: Avon Elementary School
- Website: Avon High School Website

Avon High School, or AHS, is a public four-year high school located at 320 East Wood Street in Avon, Illinois, a village in Fulton County, Illinois, in the Midwestern United States. AHS is part of Avon Community Unit School District 176, which serves the communities of Avon, St. Augustine, and Greenbush, and also includes Avon Grade School. The campus is located 25 miles west of Canton, Illinois, 20 miles south of Galesburg, Illinois, and serves a mixed village and rural residential community. The school lies within the Canton micropolitan statistical area.

== Academics ==
Avon High School mascot

In 2009 Avon High School made Adequate Yearly Progress, with 62% of students meeting standards, on the Prairie State Achievement Examination, a state test that is part of the No Child Left Behind Act. The school's average high school graduation rate between 1999 and 2009 was 94%.

== Athletics ==
Avon High School competes in the Prairieland Conference and is a member school in the Illinois High School Association. It coops with neighboring Bushnell-Prairie City High School for all athletics. Their combined name and mascot is the Spartans. The school has no state championships on record in team athletics and activities.

== History ==
=== Consolidation ===
Beginning in late 2008 the Avon School District began discussing reorganization or consolidation with neighboring school districts. In the summer of 2009 a feasibility study was commissioned to investigate the possibilities of consolidation with neighboring Bushnell-Prairie City and Abingdon school districts. The results of the study were released at a public meeting on January 28, 2010. The recommendations of the study included: consolidation of all three districts into one unit district, placement of the combined high school in the current Bushnell-Prairie City High/Middle School buildings, placement of the combined middle school in the current Abingdon High/Middle School, and keeping the current elementary buildings in place.
