= Carman, Illinois =

- Census-designated place
- Location within Illinois Location within the United States
- Coordinates: 40°44′10″N 91°03′42″W
- Country: United States
- State: Illinois
- County: Henderson County
- Township: Carman Township

Area
  - Total: 0.41 sq mi (1.06 km^{2})
  - Land: 0.41 sq mi (1.06 km^{2})
  - Water: 0 sq mi (0.00 km^{2})
- Elevation: 535 ft (163 m)

Population (2020)
  - Total: 67
  - Density: 164.0/sq mi (63.32/km^{2})
- ZIP code: 61425
- FIPS code: 17-11267
- GNIS feature ID: 2806467

Carman is an unincorporated village in Carman Township, Henderson County, Illinois, United States. As of the 2020 census, Carman had a population of 67.

== Geography ==
Carman lies on along the Mississippi River across from Burlington, Iowa. Due to its proximity to the river, parts of Carman frequently flood.

According to the 2021 census gazetteer files, Carman has a total area of 0.41 square miles (1.06 km^{2}), all land.

== Demographics ==
Historical population
| Census | Pop. | Note | %± |
|---|---|---|---|
| 2020 | 67 | | — |
U.S. Decennial Census

Carman first appeared as a census designated place in the 2020 U.S. census.

As of the 2020 census there were 67 people, 91 households, and 85 families residing in the CDP. The population density was 163.81 inhabitants per square mile (63.25/km^{2}). There were 29 housing units at an average density of 70.90 per square mile (27.37/km^{2}). The racial makeup of the CDP was 97.01% White, 0.00% African American, 0.00% Native American, 0.00% Asian, 0.00% Pacific Islander, 0.00% from other races, and 2.99% from two or more races. Hispanic or Latino of any race were 4.48% of the population.

There were 91 households, out of which 0.0% had children under the age of 18 living with them, 83.52% were married couples living together, 0.00% had a female householder with no husband present, and 6.59% were non-families. 6.59% of all households were made up of individuals, and 0.00% had someone living alone who was 65 years of age or older. The average household size was 2.13 and the average family size was 2.05.

The CDP's age distribution consisted of 0.0% under the age of 18, 0.0% from 18 to 24, 9.1% from 25 to 44, 67.9% from 45 to 64, and 23.0% who were 65 years of age or older. The median age was 64.2 years. For every 100 females, there were 133.8 males. For every 100 females age 18 and over, there were 133.8 males.
