= Delabar State Park =

State park in Henderson County, Illinois

- IUCN category III (natural monument or feature)
- Location within Illinois Location within the United States
- Location: Henderson County, Illinois, United States
- Nearest city: Oquawka, Illinois
- Coordinates: 40°57′44″N 90°56′22″W
- Area: 89 acres (36 ha)
- Established: 1960
- Governing body: Illinois Department of Natural Resources

Delabar State Park is an Illinois state park on 89 acres (36 ha) in Henderson County, Illinois, United States. The park officially opened in 1960 and was named after the two brothers, Roy and Jack Delabar, who donated the site of the park in 1959.
