= Henderson County Courthouse (Illinois) =

Local government building in the United States

Coordinates: 40°56′7″N 90°57′12″W

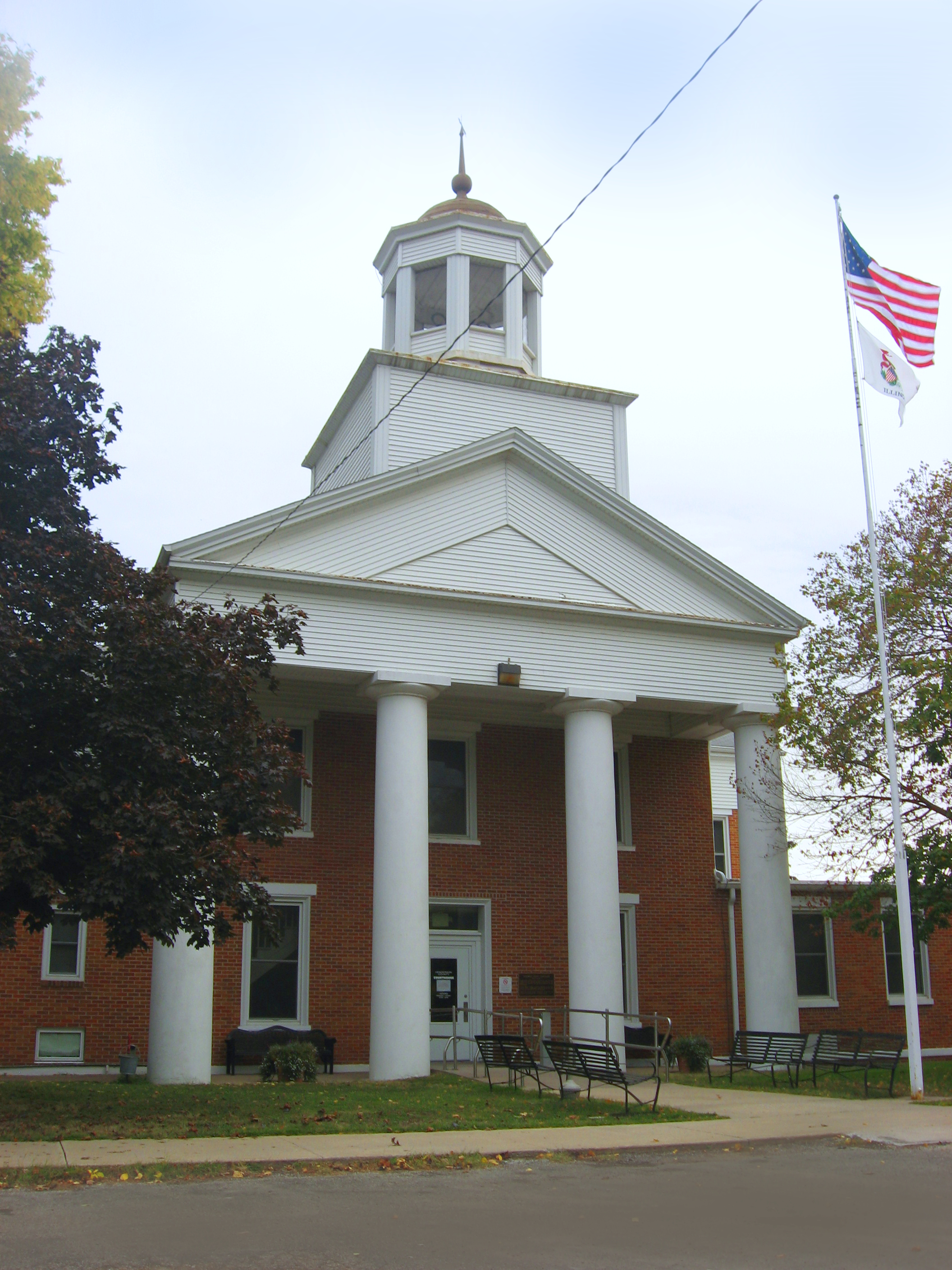
Front and eastern side of the courthouse

The Henderson County Courthouse is a government building in Oquawka, the county seat of Henderson County, Illinois, United States. Built in 1842 and later expanded, it remains in use as the county's courthouse, despite repeated attempts by other towns to obtain the status of county seat.

== History ==
Treaties were signed with local Indians as early as 1804, but cruelty on the part of early squatters in the area provoked them to warfare, and not until 1829 could land be sold in what became western Henderson County. Here a town was platted in 1836 and named Oquawka, and by 1838 it was prosperous enough to attempt to gain the status of county seat for Warren County.

Henderson County was created out of Warren County in April 1841 by a law that designated also Oquawka the county seat, and one of the first acts of the original county commission was to accept from commissioner Alexis Phelps a donation of land for county business. (Phelps and others had reserved land for this purpose five years earlier, when founding the town.) In October 1841, the county commission first announced plans to build a courthouse, and as the lowest bidder, Phelps was chosen as the contractor for a price of $1,219. Working with architect Abner Hebbard, brick mason James Ryason, and a pair of other contractors, he finished the building by the end of 1842.

Oquawka sits twice as far from the county's southern boundary as from the northern, and for this reason, residents of the southern part of the county repeatedly sought to move the seat closer to their homes. Elections were held in 1859 (seeking to move it to Warren), 1865 (to Gladstone), 1869 (to Biggsville), and 1872 (again to Gladstone), but majorities consistently favored retaining the original location. As the county has never replaced the original building, it is Illinois' second-oldest active courthouse.

Although Oquawka was not chosen to host any of the Lincoln-Douglas debates in 1858, both men visited at the Henderson County Courthouse during their campaigns; Douglas spoke on October 4, and Lincoln spoke on October 9. Douglas was already familiar with the location, having used the courthouse in the 1840s while a state appeals court judge.

== Architecture ==
At the time of construction, the courthouse was a simple two-story rectangle, built in the Greek Revival style. Its first floor was originally divided into office spaces for county officials, and a pair of staircases provided access to the large courtroom that occupied the entire second story. Two record vaults occupy the southwestern quarter; one was added after construction, while the other is perhaps original or may have been added later. A door at the rear of the building was removed in the early 1900s to make space for a small room for the judge, and in 1905 this room was expanded. The county sought to make major changes to the building in 1946, but voters rejected the proposed spending, and a smaller-scale renovation project was conducted in 1965.

Outside, the facade features a four-column portico; the columns' original brick exterior was covered with stucco in 1905. A door sits at the center of the facade, surrounded by windows. Above it, the building's roof rises to a gable, and an octagonal cupola with square base sits atop the roof and above the portico. Before wings were added to the sides, three windows pierced each story of the building's sides.
