= Henderson County, Illinois =

County in Illinois, United States

- County
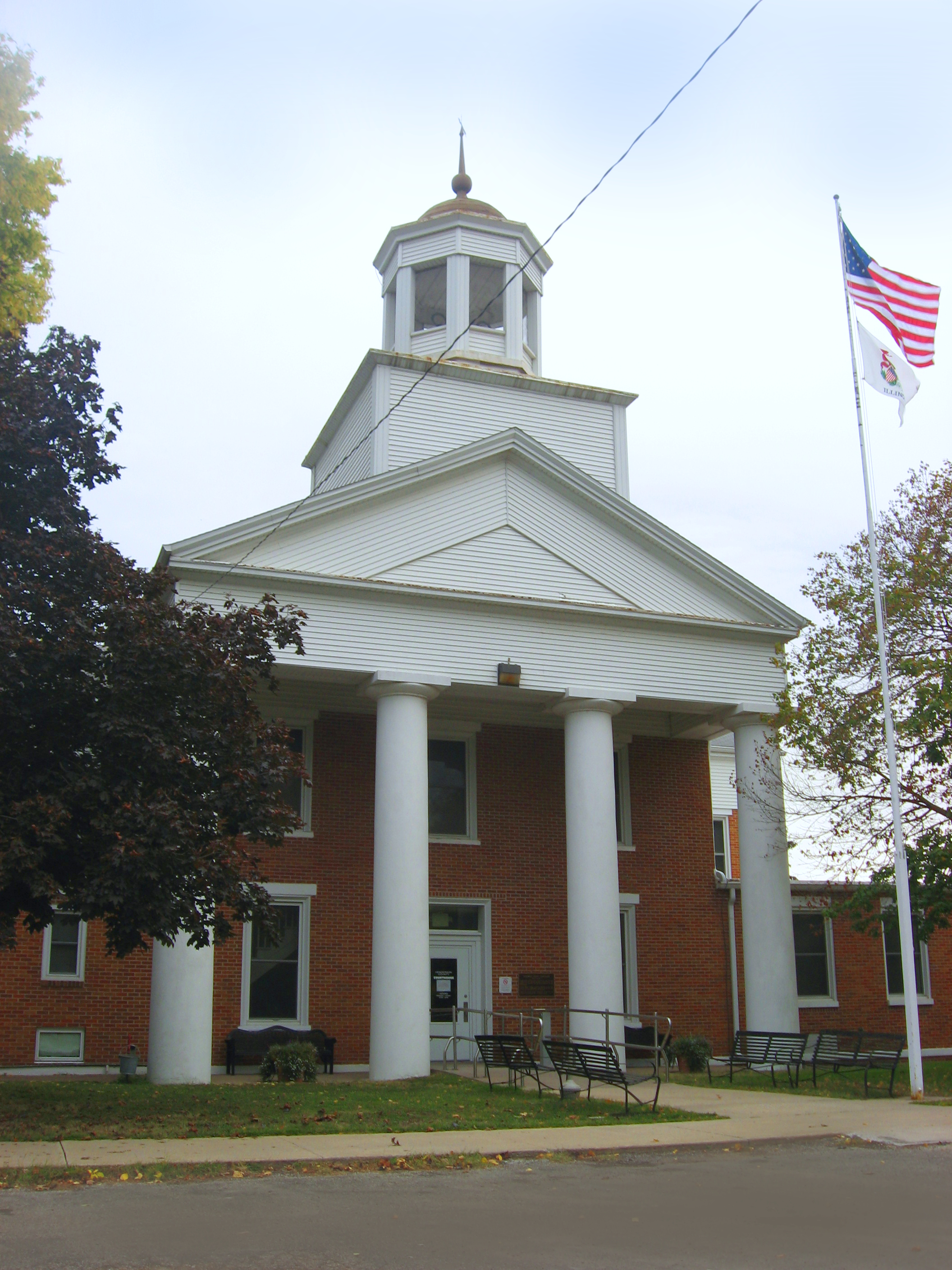
- Henderson County Courthouse, Oquawka

- Location within the U.S. state of Illinois
- Coordinates: 40°49′N 90°56′W
- Country: United States
- State: Illinois
- Founded: 1841
- Named for: Richard Henderson
- Seat: Oquawka
- Largest village: Oquawka

Area
  - Total: 395 sq mi (1,020 km^{2})
  - Land: 379 sq mi (980 km^{2})
  - Water: 16 sq mi (41 km^{2}) 4.1%

Population (2020)
  - Total: 6,387
  - Estimate (2025): 5,984 ▼
  - Density: 16.9/sq mi (6.51/km^{2})
- Time zone: UTC−6 (Central)
  - Summer (DST): UTC−5 (CDT)
- Congressional district: 15th
- Website: www.hendersoncountyedc.com

Henderson County is a county located in the U.S. state of Illinois. According to the 2020 United States census, it has a population of 6,387. Its county seat is Oquawka. Henderson County is part of the Burlington, IA–IL Micropolitan Statistical Area.

== History ==
Henderson County was formed in 1841 from a portion of Warren County. It was named for Henderson County, Kentucky, which was named for Richard Henderson, founder of the Transylvania Company, an early attempt to organize what later became Kentucky around 1775.

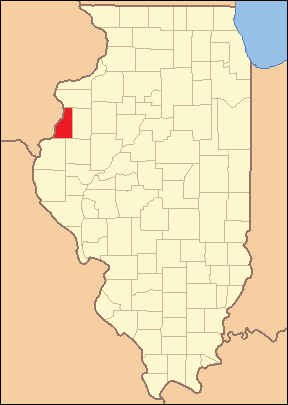
Henderson County at the time of its creation in 1841

== Geography ==
According to the US Census Bureau, the county has a total area of 395 square miles (1,020 km^{2}), of which 379 square miles (980 km^{2}) is land and 16 square miles (41 km^{2}) (4.1%) is water.

=== Climate and weather ===
Oquawka, Illinois

Climate chart (precipitation, max. and min. temperature)
J	F	M	A	M	J	J	A	S	O	N	D
1.3 30 15	1.5 36 21	3 49 31	3.6 62 43	4.4 72 54	4.5 82 63	4.5 85 67	3.9 83 65	3.6 76 57	2.9 65 46	2.7 49 33	2.1 35 21
- █ Average max. and min. temperatures in °F
- █ Precipitation totals in inches
- Source: The Weather Channel
Metric conversion
J	F	M	A	M	J	J	A	S	O	N	D
33 −1 −9	39 2 −6	75 9 −1	92 17 6	112 22 12	113 28 17	114 29 19	98 28 18	91 24 14	74 18 8	69 9 1	53 2 −6
- █ Average max. and min. temperatures in °C
- █ Precipitation totals in mm

In recent years, average temperatures in the county seat of Oquawka have ranged from a low of 15 °F (−9 °C) in January to a high of 85 °F (29 °C) in July, although a record low of −26 °F (−32 °C) was recorded in February 1996 and a record high of 105 °F (41 °C) was recorded in August 1983. Average monthly precipitation ranged from 1.31 inches (33 mm) in January to 4.48 inches (114 mm) in July.

=== Major highways ===
- U.S. Highway 34
- Illinois Route 94
- Illinois Route 96
- Illinois Route 116
- Illinois Route 164

=== Adjacent counties ===
- Mercer County - north
- Warren County - east
- McDonough County - southeast
- Hancock County - south
- Lee County, Iowa - southwest
- Des Moines County, Iowa - west

== Demographics ==
Historical population
Census	Pop.	Note	%±
1850	4,612		—
1860	9,501		106.0%
1870	12,582		32.4%
1880	10,722		−14.8%
1890	9,876		−7.9%
1900	10,836		9.7%
1910	9,724		−10.3%
1920	9,770		0.5%
1930	8,778		−10.2%
1940	8,949		1.9%
1950	8,416		−6.0%
1960	8,237		−2.1%
1970	8,451		2.6%
1980	9,114		7.8%
1990	8,096		−11.2%
2000	8,213		1.4%
2010	7,331		−10.7%
2020	6,387		−12.9%
2025 (est.)	5,984	▼	−6.3%
US Decennial Census; 1790-1960 1900-1990; 1990-2000 2010

=== 2020 census ===
As of the 2020 census, the county had a population of 6,387. The median age was 50.1 years. 18.8% of residents were under the age of 18 and 26.0% of residents were 65 years of age or older. For every 100 females there were 99.4 males, and for every 100 females age 18 and over there were 96.3 males age 18 and over.

The racial makeup of the county was 95.4% White, 0.5% Black or African American, 0.2% American Indian and Alaska Native, 0.3% Asian, 0.1% Native Hawaiian and Pacific Islander, 0.4% from some other race, and 3.2% from two or more races. Hispanic or Latino residents of any race comprised 1.8% of the population.

0.5% of residents lived in urban areas, while 99.5% lived in rural areas.

There were 2,834 households in the county, of which 23.2% had children under the age of 18 living in them. Of all households, 51.4% were married-couple households, 18.9% were households with a male householder and no spouse or partner present, and 22.8% were households with a female householder and no spouse or partner present. About 30.8% of all households were made up of individuals and 16.0% had someone living alone who was 65 years of age or older.

There were 3,357 housing units, of which 15.6% were vacant. Among occupied housing units, 80.3% were owner-occupied and 19.7% were renter-occupied. The homeowner vacancy rate was 1.0% and the rental vacancy rate was 11.8%.

=== Racial and ethnic composition ===
Henderson County, Illinois – Racial and ethnic composition Note: the US Census treats Hispanic/Latino as an ethnic category. This table excludes Latinos from the racial categories and assigns them to a separate category. Hispanics/Latinos may be of any race.
Race / Ethnicity (NH = Non-Hispanic)	Pop 1980	Pop 1990	Pop 2000	Pop 2010	Pop 2020	% 1980	% 1990	% 2000	% 2010	% 2020
White alone (NH)	9,003	7,998	8,041	7,133	6,060	98.78%	98.79%	97.91%	97.30%	94.88%
Black or African American alone (NH)	1	8	21	15	29	0.01%	0.10%	0.26%	0.20%	0.45%
Native American or Alaska Native alone (NH)	4	24	7	15	5	0.04%	0.30%	0.09%	0.20%	0.08%
Asian alone (NH)	15	10	8	15	14	0.16%	0.12%	0.10%	0.20%	0.22%
Native Hawaiian or Pacific Islander alone (NH)	x	x	3	5	5	x	x	0.04%	0.07%	0.08%
Other race alone (NH)	9	0	0	3	0	0.10%	0.00%	0.00%	0.04%	0.00%
Mixed race or Multiracial (NH)	x	x	61	66	162	x	x	0.74%	0.90%	2.54%
Hispanic or Latino (any race)	82	56	72	79	112	0.90%	0.69%	0.88%	1.08%	1.75%
Total	9,114	8,096	8,213	7,331	6,387	100.00%	100.00%	100.00%	100.00%	100.00%

=== 2010 census ===
As of the 2010 United States census, there were 7,331 people, 3,149 households, and 2,127 families residing in the county. The population density was 19.3 inhabitants per square mile (7.5/km^{2}). There were 3,827 housing units at an average density of 10.1 per square mile (3.9/km^{2}).

The racial makeup of the county was 98.2% white, 0.2% Asian, 0.2% American Indian, 0.2% black or African American, 0.1% Pacific islander, 0.2% from other races, and 1.0% from two or more races. Those of Hispanic or Latino origin made up 1.1% of the population. In terms of ancestry, 24.4% were German, 14.5% were Irish, 11.9% were English, 5.9% were Swedish, and 5.0% were American.

Of the 3,149 households, 26.9% had children under the age of 18 living with them, 54.9% were married couples living together, 8.7% had a female householder with no husband present, 32.5% were non-families, and 27.3% of all households were made up of individuals. The average household size was 2.31 and the average family size was 2.78. The median age was 47.2 years.

The median income for a household in the county was $43,450 and the median income for a family was $55,154. Males had a median income of $41,052 versus $27,426 for females. The per capita income for the county was $22,492. About 7.8% of families and 11.4% of the population were below the poverty line, including 13.3% of those under age 18 and 8.3% of those age 65 or over.

== Government and politics ==
=== Government ===
==== County Board ====
Office	Name	Party
County Board at-large	Kim Gullberg	Republican
County Board at-large	Bill Knupp	Republican
County Board at-large	Kurt McChesney	Republican
County Board at-large	Todd Miller	Republican
County Board at-large	Janet Stubbs	Republican

County Board at-large Dick Bigger Democrat

==== County Officials ====
Office	Name	Party
Circuit Clerk	Sandra Keane	Republican
Coroner	John Fedler	Republican
State's Attorney	Kristen L. Petrie	Republican

=== Courts ===
==== Judicial Court ====
Office	Name	Party
9th Circuit Court	Bruce Beal	Independent
9th Circuit Court	James Standard	Independent
9th Circuit Court	Nigel Graham	Republican
9th Circuit Court	Rodney Clark	Independent

As part of Yankee-settled Northern Illinois, Henderson County was solidly Whig in its first three elections and then equally Republican from that party's formation until the Great Depression. Franklin D. Roosevelt in 1932 was the first Democrat to win it, but the county returned to Republican Alf Landon in 1936 and was not won by a Democrat until the GOP nominated the southern-oriented conservative Barry Goldwater in 1964.

After that, like many Yankee counties, it returned to its Republican roots between 1968 and 1984, but turned reliably Democratic in presidential elections from 1988 to 2012. Republican Donald Trump carried the county with over 61 percent of the vote in 2016; the highest percentage won by any Republican candidate since Dwight D. Eisenhower in 1956, and for then Democratic opponent Hillary Clinton, it was the lowest by a Democrat since Al Smith in 1928. Republican margins have continued to improve in each subsequent election as rural Illinois shifts sharply to the right and native son Barack Obama is no longer on the ballot, with Trump's 68% in 2024 marking the best Republican result since 1928. The county's new Republican dominance has extended to the local level as well, with Republicans going entirely unchallenged for county office.

Henderson County is located in Illinois's 15th Congressional District and is currently represented by Republican Mary Miller. For the Illinois House of Representatives, the county is located in the 94th district and is currently represented by Republican Norine Hammond. The county is located in the 47th district of the Illinois Senate, and is currently represented by Republican Jil Tracy. Along with five other counties, (Note: Fulton, Hancock, Knox, McDonough, Warren) Henderson County makes up Illinois's 9th Judicial Circuit Court.

United States presidential election results for Henderson County, Illinois
Year	Republican		Democratic		Third party(ies)	
Year	No.	%	No.	%	No.	%
1892	1,352	55.94%	921	38.11%	144	5.96%
1896	1,756	62.80%	962	34.41%	78	2.79%
1900	1,772	61.98%	976	34.14%	111	3.88%
1904	1,668	65.67%	708	27.87%	164	6.46%
1908	1,547	62.23%	820	32.98%	119	4.79%
1912	648	27.84%	721	30.97%	959	41.19%
1916	2,528	58.50%	1,611	37.28%	182	4.21%
1920	2,747	76.65%	740	20.65%	97	2.71%
1924	2,879	72.87%	803	20.32%	269	6.81%
1928	2,695	71.11%	1,065	28.10%	30	0.79%
1932	1,815	42.55%	2,372	55.60%	79	1.85%
1936	2,663	51.02%	2,496	47.82%	61	1.17%
1940	3,264	61.81%	1,977	37.44%	40	0.76%
1944	2,695	63.34%	1,550	36.43%	10	0.24%
1948	2,336	60.87%	1,465	38.17%	37	0.96%
1952	2,839	65.98%	1,458	33.88%	6	0.14%
1956	2,743	65.08%	1,469	34.85%	3	0.07%
1960	2,572	60.19%	1,697	39.71%	4	0.09%
1964	1,863	45.07%	2,271	54.93%	0	0.00%
1968	2,224	53.62%	1,635	39.42%	289	6.97%
1972	2,689	60.62%	1,744	39.31%	3	0.07%
1976	2,210	50.15%	2,152	48.83%	45	1.02%
1980	2,443	57.54%	1,609	37.89%	194	4.57%
1984	2,289	53.51%	1,969	46.03%	20	0.47%
1988	1,726	45.17%	2,085	54.57%	10	0.26%
1992	1,310	32.36%	2,013	49.73%	725	17.91%
1996	1,233	34.07%	1,953	53.97%	433	11.96%
2000	1,708	44.18%	2,030	52.51%	128	3.31%
2004	1,857	44.71%	2,269	54.64%	27	0.65%
2008	1,541	40.25%	2,215	57.85%	73	1.91%
2012	1,541	43.19%	1,978	55.44%	49	1.37%
2016	2,155	61.26%	1,155	32.83%	208	5.91%
2020	2,394	65.48%	1,187	32.47%	75	2.05%
2024	2,369	68.27%	1,026	29.57%	75	2.16%

== Communities ==
=== City ===
- Dallas City (partly in Hancock County)

=== Villages ===
- Biggsville
- Gladstone
- Gulfport
- Lomax
- Media
- Oquawka
- Raritan
- Stronghurst

=== Census-designated place ===
- Carman

=== Unincorporated communities ===
- Bald Bluff
- Carthage Lake
- Decorra
- Hopper
- Olena
- Shokonon
- Terre Haute

=== Townships ===
Henderson County is divided into eleven townships:

- Bald Bluff
- Biggsville
- Carman
- Gladstone
- Lomax
- Media
- Oquawka
- Raritan
- Rozetta
- Stronghurst
- Terre Haute

=== State and Federal facilities ===
- Big River State Forest - 2,900 acre preserve adjacent to the Mississippi River (1925)
- Delabar State Park - 89 acre preserve adjacent to the Mississippi River (1960)
- Oquawka State Wildlife Refuge

== Education ==
K-12 school districts include:

- Mercer County School District 404
- United Community School District 304
- West Central Community Unit School District 235
- West Prairie Community Unit School District 103

There is one secondary school district that extends into the county, Illini West High School District 307, as well as two elementary school districts: Dallas Elementary School District 327 and La Harpe Community School District 347.

== See also ==
- National Register of Historic Places listings in Henderson County, Illinois
