= Stronghurst, Illinois =

- Village
- Location of Stronghurst in Henderson County, Illinois.

- Location of Illinois in the United States
- Coordinates: 40°44′46″N 90°54′32″W
- Country: United States
- State: Illinois
- County: Henderson
- Townships: Stronghurst, Media

Area
  - Total: 0.87 sq mi (2.26 km^{2})
  - Land: 0.87 sq mi (2.26 km^{2})
  - Water: 0 sq mi (0.00 km^{2})
- Elevation: 673 ft (205 m)

Population (2020)
  - Total: 833
  - Density: 954.0/sq mi (368.36/km^{2})
- Time zone: UTC-6 (CST)
  - Summer (DST): UTC-5 (CDT)
- ZIP Code(s): 61480
- Area code: 309
- FIPS code: 17-73261
- GNIS feature ID: 2399921
- Wikimedia Commons: Stronghurst, Illinois
- Website: https://www.villageofstronghurst.org/

Stronghurst is a village in Henderson County, Illinois, United States. The population was 833 at the 2020 census. It is part of the Burlington, IA–IL Micropolitan Statistical Area.

== Geography ==
Stronghurst is located in southern Henderson County. Illinois Route 94 passes through the village, leading north 9 miles (14 km) to Biggsville and south 15 miles (24 km) to La Harpe. Burlington, Iowa, is 15 miles to the northwest.

According to the 2021 census gazetteer files, Stronghurst has a total area of 0.87 square miles (2.25 km^{2}), all land.

== Demographics ==
Historical population
Census	Pop.	Note	%±
1900	762		—
1910	762		0.0%
1920	836		9.7%
1930	734		−12.2%
1940	691		−5.9%
1950	741		7.2%
1960	815		10.0%
1970	836		2.6%
1980	865		3.5%
1990	799		−7.6%
2000	896		12.1%
2010	883		−1.5%
2020	833		−5.7%
U.S. Decennial Census

As of the 2020 census there were 833 people, 373 households, and 268 families residing in the village. The population density was 954.18 inhabitants per square mile (368.41/km^{2}). There were 404 housing units at an average density of 462.77 per square mile (178.68/km^{2}). The racial makeup of the village was 95.32% White, 0.60% African American, 0.00% Native American, 0.48% Asian, 0.00% Pacific Islander, 0.00% from other races, and 3.60% from two or more races. Hispanic or Latino of any race were 2.16% of the population.

There were 373 households, out of which 40.5% had children under the age of 18 living with them, 56.57% were married couples living together, 9.12% had a female householder with no husband present, and 28.15% were non-families. 24.93% of all households were made up of individuals, and 14.75% had someone living alone who was 65 years of age or older. The average household size was 3.28 and the average family size was 2.75.

The village's age distribution consisted of 31.1% under the age of 18, 9.3% from 18 to 24, 23.9% from 25 to 44, 18% from 45 to 64, and 17.7% who were 65 years of age or older. The median age was 35.4 years. For every 100 females, there were 74.5 males. For every 100 females age 18 and over, there were 67.6 males.

The median income for a household in the village was $51,979, and the median income for a family was $72,188. Males had a median income of $38,281 versus $28,750 for females. The per capita income for the village was $20,945. About 4.9% of families and 7.7% of the population were below the poverty line, including 5.1% of those under age 18 and 2.6% of those age 65 or over.

== Transportation ==
Amtrak’s Southwest Chief, which operates between Los Angeles and Chicago, passes through the town on BNSF tracks, but makes no stop. A station is located in Fort Madison, 27 miles (43 km) to the southwest. The California Zephyr has a stop located in Burlington, which is 18 miles (29 km) to the west.

== Community activities ==
Community activities include the Henderson County Fair, the Henderson County Old Tyme Farm Show, and the holiday merchants' walk. An annual Easter egg hunt has been held at the city park for the last few years.
