= Latham, Illinois =

- Village
- Interactive map of Latham, Illinois
- Coordinates: 39°58′01″N 89°9′44″W
- Country: United States
- State: Illinois
- County: Logan
- Township: Laenna

Area
  - Total: 0.27 sq mi (0.71 km^{2})
  - Land: 0.27 sq mi (0.71 km^{2})
  - Water: 0 sq mi (0.00 km^{2})
- Elevation: 620 ft (190 m)

Population (2020)
  - Total: 333
  - Density: 1,219.2/sq mi (470.73/km^{2})
- Time zone: UTC−6 (CST)
  - Summer (DST): UTC−5 (CDT)
- ZIP code: 62543
- Area code: 217
- FIPS code: 17-42249
- GNIS feature ID: 2398396

Latham is a village in Logan County, Illinois, United States. As of the 2020 census, Latham had a population of 333.

== History ==
Latham was platted in 1871 and named in honor of Robert B. Latham, a railroad official. A post office called Latham has been in operation since 1872.

== Geography ==
Latham is located in southeastern Logan County. Illinois Route 121 passes around the north and east sides of the village, leading northwest 7 miles (11 km) to Mount Pulaski and 18 miles (29 km) to Lincoln, the county seat, while to the southeast it leads 6 miles (10 km) to Warrensburg and 15 miles (24 km) to Decatur.

According to the 2021 census gazetteer files, Latham has a total area of 0.27 square miles (0.70 km^{2}), all land.

== Demographics ==
Historical population
Census	Pop.	Note	%±
1880	251		—
1890	265		5.6%
1900	429		61.9%
1910	438		2.1%
1920	444		1.4%
1930	372		−16.2%
1940	369		−0.8%
1950	387		4.9%
1960	389		0.5%
1970	361		−7.2%
1980	564		56.2%
1990	482		−14.5%
2000	371		−23.0%
2010	380		2.4%
2020	333		−12.4%
U.S. Decennial Census

As of the 2020 census there were 333 people, 149 households, and 84 families residing in the village. The population density was 1,219.78 inhabitants per square mile (470.96/km^{2}). There were 191 housing units at an average density of 699.63 per square mile (270.13/km^{2}). The racial makeup of the village was 94.29% White, 0.00% African American, 0.00% Native American, 0.30% Asian, 0.00% Pacific Islander, 0.30% from other races, and 5.11% from two or more races. Hispanic or Latino of any race were 0.60% of the population.

There were 149 households, out of which 20.8% had children under the age of 18 living with them, 46.31% were married couples living together, 6.04% had a female householder with no husband present, and 43.62% were non-families. 12.75% of all households were made up of individuals, and 2.68% had someone living alone who was 65 years of age or older. The average household size was 2.95 and the average family size was 2.38.

The village's age distribution consisted of 19.4% under the age of 18, 19.7% from 18 to 24, 14.7% from 25 to 44, 28.4% from 45 to 64, and 17.7% who were 65 years of age or older. The median age was 39.1 years. For every 100 females, there were 129.0 males. For every 100 females age 18 and over, there were 116.7 males.

The median income for a household in the village was $54,309, and the median income for a family was $66,250. Males had a median income of $41,411 versus $24,000 for females. The per capita income for the village was $26,002. About 7.1% of families and 11.3% of the population were below the poverty line, including 20.3% of those under age 18 and 0.0% of those age 65 or over.

== Education ==
It is in the Warrensburg-Latham Community Unit School District 11.

== Notable people ==
- Chad Gray, (b. 1971) singer in heavy metal band Mudvayne and the Super Group HELLYEAH
- Eugene Earl "Junior" Thompson, (1917 - 2006) pitcher for the Cincinnati Reds and New York Giants
