= Burton View, Illinois =

- Unincorporated community
- Location in Illinois Location in the United States
- Coordinates: 40°10′15″N 89°29′05″W
- Country: United States
- State: Illinois
- County: Logan
- Townships: Sheridan, West Lincoln
- Elevation: 568 ft (173 m)
- Time zone: UTC-6 (CST)
  - Summer (DST): UTC-5 (CDT)
- Area code: 217
- GNIS feature ID: 405276

Burton View is an unincorporated community in Logan County, along Illinois Route 10 in Central Illinois. The community lies between Lincoln and New Holland on Route 10.

== History ==
Burton View was originally called Burton, and under the latter name had its start when the Champaign, Lincoln and Eastern Railroad was extended to that point. A post office called Burton View was established in 1873, and remained in operation until 1918.
