= Harness, Illinois =

- Unincorporated community
- Location within Illinois Location within the United States
- Coordinates: 40°14′51″N 89°35′30″W
- Country: United States
- State: Illinois
- County: Logan
- Township: Prairie Creek
- Elevation: 561 ft (171 m)
- Time zone: UTC-6 (Central (CST))
  - Summer (DST): UTC-5 (CDT)
- Area code: 217
- GNIS feature ID: 422773

Harness is an unincorporated community in Logan County, Illinois, United States. Harness is located west of Hartsburg and south of San Jose.

== History ==
Harness was laid out in 1900 by Daniel R. Harness, and named for him.
