= Illini Township, Macon County, Illinois =

Coordinates: 39°55′N 89°5′W

Illini Township
- Township
- Location in Macon County

- Macon County's location in Illinois
- Country: United States
- State: Illinois
- County: Macon
- Settlement: February 1864

Area
  - Total: 36.67 sq mi (95.0 km^{2})
  - Land: 36.67 sq mi (95.0 km^{2})
  - Water: 0 sq mi (0 km^{2}) 0%

Population (2020)
  - Total: 1,347
  - Density: 36.73/sq mi (14.18/km^{2})
- Time zone: UTC-6 (CST)
  - Summer (DST): UTC-5 (CDT)
- FIPS code: 17-115-37023

Illini Township is located in Macon County, Illinois. As of the 2020 census, its population was 1,347 and it contained 619 housing units.

== Cities and towns ==
- Heman
- Warrensburg

== Adjacent townships ==
- Austin Township (north)
- Maroa Township (northeast)
- Hickory Point Township (east)
- Decatur Township (southeast)
- Harristow Township (south)
- Niantic Township (southwest and west)
- Lake Fork Township, Logan County (west)
- Laenna Township, Logan County (northwest)

== Geography ==
According to the 2021 census gazetteer files, Illini Township has a total area of 36.67 square miles (94.97 km^{2}), all land.

== Demographics ==
As of the 2020 census there were 1,347 people, 505 households, and 406 families residing in the township. The population density was 36.74 inhabitants per square mile (14.19/km^{2}). There were 619 housing units at an average density of 16.88 per square mile (6.52/km^{2}). The racial makeup of the township was 93.39% White, 0.45% African American, 0.07% Native American, 0.15% Asian, 0.00% Pacific Islander, 0.67% from other races, and 5.27% from two or more races. Hispanic or Latino of any race were 1.34% of the population.

There were 505 households, out of which 39.00% had children under the age of 18 living with them, 54.65% were married couples living together, 20.79% had a female householder with no spouse present, and 19.60% were non-families. 18.60% of all households were made up of individuals, and 9.70% had someone living alone who was 65 years of age or older. The average household size was 2.85 and the average family size was 3.23.

According to the 2020 American Community Survey, township's age distribution consisted of 26.9% under the age of 18, 14.5% from 18 to 24, 19.9% from 25 to 44, 20.6% from 45 to 64, and 18.0% who were 65 years of age or older. The median age was 37.2 years. For every 100 females, there were 101.3 males. For every 100 females age 18 and over, there were 99.6 males.

The median income for a household in the township was $63,750, and the median income for a family was $80,323. Males had a median income of $39,839 versus $33,614 for females. The per capita income for the township was $26,411. About 4.7% of families and 6.4% of the population were below the poverty line, including 3.9% of those under age 18 and 8.5% of those age 65 or over.

Historical population
Census	Pop.	Note	%±
2000	1,563		—
2010	1,469		−6.0%
2020	1,347		−8.3%
U.S. Decennial Census
