= Chestervale, Illinois =

- Unincorporated community
- Location in Illinois Location in the United States
- Coordinates: 40°05′32″N 89°19′18″W
- Country: United States
- State: Illinois
- County: Logan
- Township: Chester
- Elevation: 610 ft (190 m)
- Time zone: UTC−6 (CST)
  - Summer (DST): UTC−5 (CDT)
- ZIP Code: 62656
- Area code: 217
- GNIS feature ID: 406031

Chestervale is an unincorporated community in Logan County in Central Illinois. It is approximately 3.2 miles southeast of Lincoln, along Illinois Route 121. The community consists of a grain elevator, a county highway shed and a few homes. It is on the Canadian National Railway.
