= West Lincoln Township, Logan County, Illinois =

West Lincoln Township
- Township
- Location in Logan County

- Logan County's location in Illinois
- Country: United States
- State: Illinois
- County: Logan
- Established: November 7, 1865

Area
  - Total: 38.24 sq mi (99.0 km^{2})
  - Land: 38.06 sq mi (98.6 km^{2})
  - Water: 0.18 sq mi (0.47 km^{2}) 0.46%

Population (2020)
  - Total: 7,437
  - Density: 195.4/sq mi (75.45/km^{2})
- Time zone: UTC-6 (CST)
  - Summer (DST): UTC-5 (CDT)
- FIPS code: 17-107-80593

West Lincoln Township is located in Logan County, Illinois. As of the 2020 census, its population was 7,437 and it contained 3,618 housing units.

== Geography ==
According to the 2021 census gazetteer files, West Lincoln Township has a total area of 38.24 square miles (99.04 km^{2}), of which 38.06 square miles (98.57 km^{2}) (or 99.54%) is land and 0.18 square miles (0.47 km^{2}) (or 0.46%) is water.

=== Cities, Towns, Villages ===
- Lincoln (west half)

=== Unincorporated Towns ===
- Bell
- Burton View (east half)

=== Extinct Towns ===
- Postville at 40.147377°N 89.380328°W

== Demographics ==
As of the 2020 census there were 7,437 people, 3,379 households, and 2,100 families residing in the township. The population density was 194.49 inhabitants per square mile (75.09/km^{2}). There were 3,618 housing units at an average density of 94.62 per square mile (36.53/km^{2}). The racial makeup of the township was 90.71% White, 2.55% African American, 0.20% Native American, 0.70% Asian, 0.01% Pacific Islander, 0.52% from other races, and 5.30% from two or more races. Hispanic or Latino of any race were 2.26% of the population.

There were 3,379 households, out of which 21.90% had children under the age of 18 living with them, 45.93% were married couples living together, 6.72% had a female householder with no spouse present, and 37.85% were non-families. 29.70% of all households were made up of individuals, and 14.40% had someone living alone who was 65 years of age or older. The average household size was 2.10 and the average family size was 2.63.

According to the 2020 American Community Survey, township's age distribution consisted of 19.9% under the age of 18, 8.4% from 18 to 24, 20% from 25 to 44, 27% from 45 to 64, and 24.7% who were 65 years of age or older. The median age was 46.2 years. For every 100 females, there were 89.2 males. For every 100 females age 18 and over, there were 84.5 males.

The median income for a household in the township was $49,907, and the median income for a family was $61,354. Males had a median income of $40,185 versus $33,489 for females. The per capita income for the township was $33,260. About 14.5% of families and 11.2% of the population were below the poverty line, including 9.9% of those under age 18 and 7.9% of those age 65 or over.

Historical population
Census	Pop.	Note	%±
2000	8,042		—
2010	7,685		−4.4%
2020	7,437		−3.2%
U.S. Decennial Census
