= Mount Pulaski Courthouse State Historic Site =

- Mount Pulaski Courthouse
- U.S. National Register of Historic Places
- Illinois State Historic Site
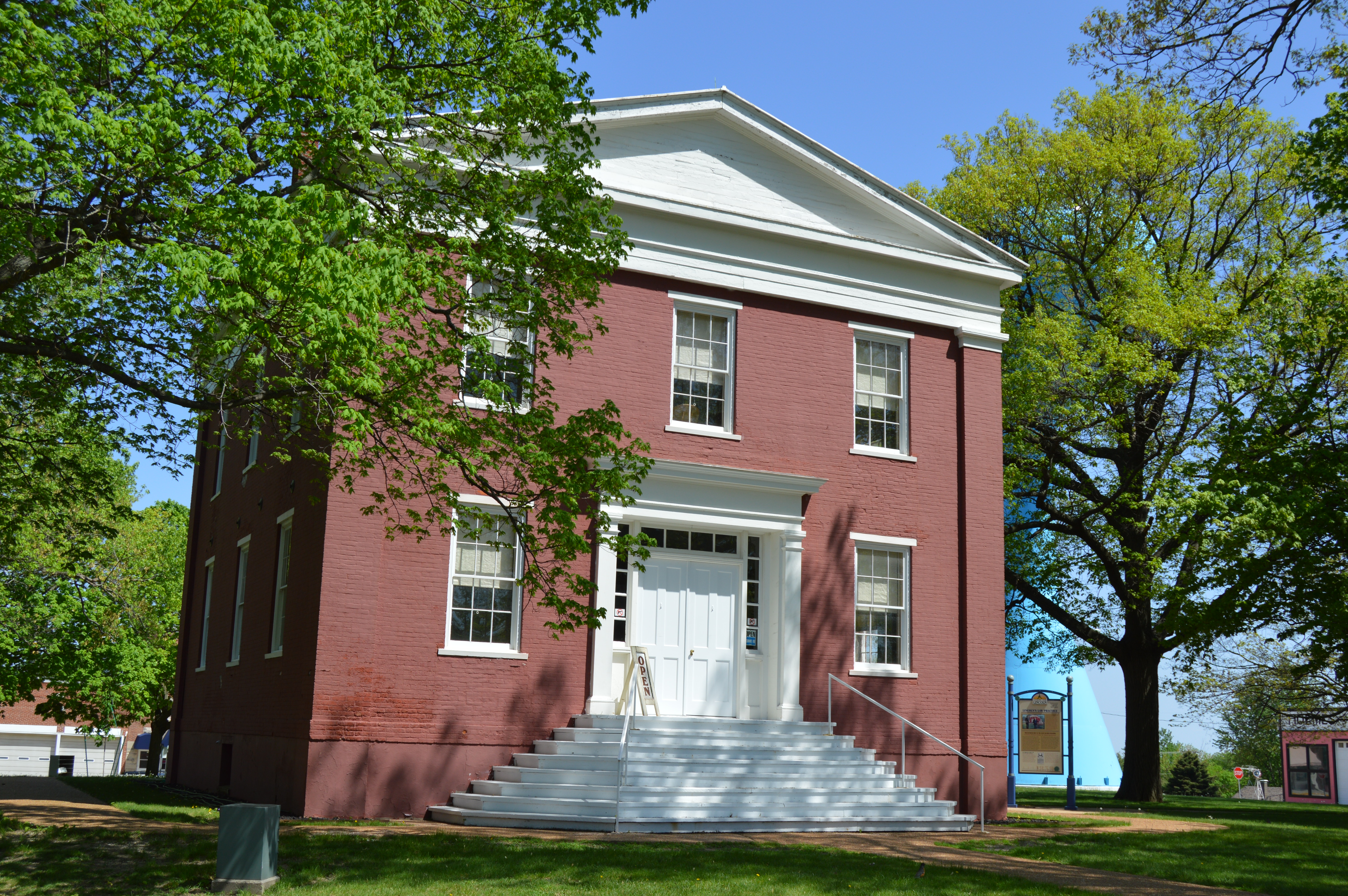
- Western front and northern side

- Location within Illinois Location within the United States
- Location: Public Sq., Mount Pulaski, Illinois
- Coordinates: 40°0′34″N 89°17′10″W
- Area: Less than 1 acre (0.40 ha)
- Built: 1847
- Architectural style: Greek Revival
- NRHP reference No.: 78001164
- Added to NRHP: August 3, 1978

The Mount Pulaski Courthouse State Historic Site is a historic county courthouse located in Mount Pulaski, Illinois, United States. It was the county seat of Logan County from 1848 until 1855. It is one of only two remaining courthouses from Illinois's Eighth Circuit, the circuit on which central Illinois lawyer Abraham Lincoln carried out much of his practice of law. The courthouse is operated by the Illinois Historic Preservation Agency as a state historic site. Visitors are given guided tours of the recreated county offices and courtroom.

== 1848-1855: courthouse ==
Prior to 1848, the people of Logan County used a frame courthouse, now the Postville Courthouse State Historic Site, located close to the center of the county at Postville. Frame courthouses were especially vulnerable to fire, and county leaders began looking for a community that would subsidize the construction of a masonry structure. Mount Pulaski citizens combined to contribute $2,700 toward the $3,000 for a new structure. This two-story brick building stands today as the Mount Pulaski Courthouse. The Greek Revival building features pediments spanning the length of the building and pilasters at each corner.

When the new courthouse was built in 1848, Abraham Lincoln of nearby Springfield was representing central Illinois in the U.S. House of Representatives. Returning to Illinois in 1849, he resumed the practice of law in the Eighth Circuit, and often visited the Mount Pulaski courthouse. Mount Pulaski is located 25 miles (40 km) north of Springfield, a day's journey by the horse and light buggy that Lincoln used.

Mount Pulaski is located in the southeastern quarter of Logan County. In the early 1850s, developers built a railroad, which would become the Chicago and Alton Railroad, northeastward from Springfield through Logan County. The new railroad became the focus of county development, and it did not go near Mount Pulaski. The railroad and county leaders agreed to move the Logan County seat once again, to a location very near the center of the county and directly on the new railroad line. The new county seat was named Lincoln, Illinois, after lawyer Lincoln, who by this time had made many friends throughout the county. The decision was affirmed by county voters in a referendum in 1853, and the court and county government had moved away by 1855.

County leaders' fear of fire proved to be well-founded in 1857, when a blaze destroyed the relocated county records, including the dockets of the Logan County circuit court. As a result, very little is known of Lincoln's specific legal cases in Logan County during the Mount Pulaski interval.

== After 1855 ==
Mount Pulaski only served as the county seat until 1853, when it moved to Lincoln, so the courthouse only served in its intended capacity for five years. After 1853, the building served as a school, the Mount Pulaski city hall and jail, and the local post office.

Illinois Governor Henry Horner launched a statewide search in the 1930s for surviving public buildings with which Lincoln had been familiar. Mount Pulaski gave the old brick courthouse building to the state of Illinois in 1936, and the state extensively restored it in 1936–1939 to resemble its function as the county courthouse.

The courthouse was added to the National Register of Historic Places on August 3, 1978, qualifying both because of its place in local history and because of its historically significant architecture. According to a member of the Logan County planning commission at the time, the building "ranks among the finest and best-preserved pre-1850 buildings in the state."
