= Niantic Township, Macon County, Illinois =

Coordinates: 39°52′N 89°11′W

Niantic Township
- Township
- Location in Macon County

- Macon County's location in Illinois
- Country: United States
- State: Illinois
- County: Macon
- Settlement: November 8, 1859

Area
  - Total: 29.17 sq mi (75.5 km^{2})
  - Land: 29.11 sq mi (75.4 km^{2})
  - Water: 0.06 sq mi (0.16 km^{2}) 0.20%

Population (2020)
  - Total: 751
  - Density: 25.8/sq mi (9.96/km^{2})
- Time zone: UTC-6 (CST)
  - Summer (DST): UTC-5 (CDT)
- FIPS code: 17-115-52974

Niantic Township is located in Macon County, Illinois. As of the 2020 census, its population was 751 and it contained 330 housing units.

== Cities and towns ==
- Niantic

== Adjacent townships ==
- Lake Fork Township, Logan County (northwest and north)
- Illini Township (northeast and east)
- Harristown Township (east)
- Blue Mound Township (southeast)
- Mosquito Township, Christian County (south and southwest)
- Illiopolis Township, Sangamon County (west)

== Geography ==
According to the 2021 census gazetteer files, Niantic Township has a total area of 29.17 square miles (75.55 km^{2}), of which 29.11 square miles (75.39 km^{2}) (or 99.80%) is land and 0.06 square miles (0.16 km^{2}) (or 0.20%) is water.

== Demographics ==
As of the 2020 census there were 751 people, 250 households, and 157 families residing in the township. The population density was 25.75 inhabitants per square mile (9.94/km^{2}). There were 330 housing units at an average density of 11.31 per square mile (4.37/km^{2}). The racial makeup of the township was 95.47% White, 0.13% African American, 0.53% Native American, 0.67% Asian, 0.00% Pacific Islander, 0.40% from other races, and 2.80% from two or more races. Hispanic or Latino of any race were 1.20% of the population.

There were 250 households, out of which 26.40% had children under the age of 18 living with them, 51.20% were married couples living together, 3.60% had a female householder with no spouse present, and 37.20% were non-families. 31.20% of all households were made up of individuals, and 14.00% had someone living alone who was 65 years of age or older. The average household size was 2.96 and the average family size was 3.74.

According to the 2020 American Community Survey, township's age distribution consisted of 33.5% under the age of 18, 5.8% from 18 to 24, 22.1% from 25 to 44, 25.8% from 45 to 64, and 12.8% who were 65 years of age or older. The median age was 37.3 years. For every 100 females, there were 99.7 males. For every 100 females age 18 and over, there were 100.7 males.

The median income for a household in the township was $56,607, and the median income for a family was $72,083. Males had a median income of $56,406 versus $24,643 for females. The per capita income for the township was $26,574. About 2.5% of families and 3.4% of the population were below the poverty line, including 0.9% of those under age 18 and 6.3% of those age 65 or over.

Historical population
Census	Pop.	Note	%±
2000	896		—
2010	842		−6.0%
2020	751		−10.8%
U.S. Decennial Census
