= Orvil Township, Logan County, Illinois =

Coordinates: 40°16′21″N 89°25′37″W

Orvil Township
- Township
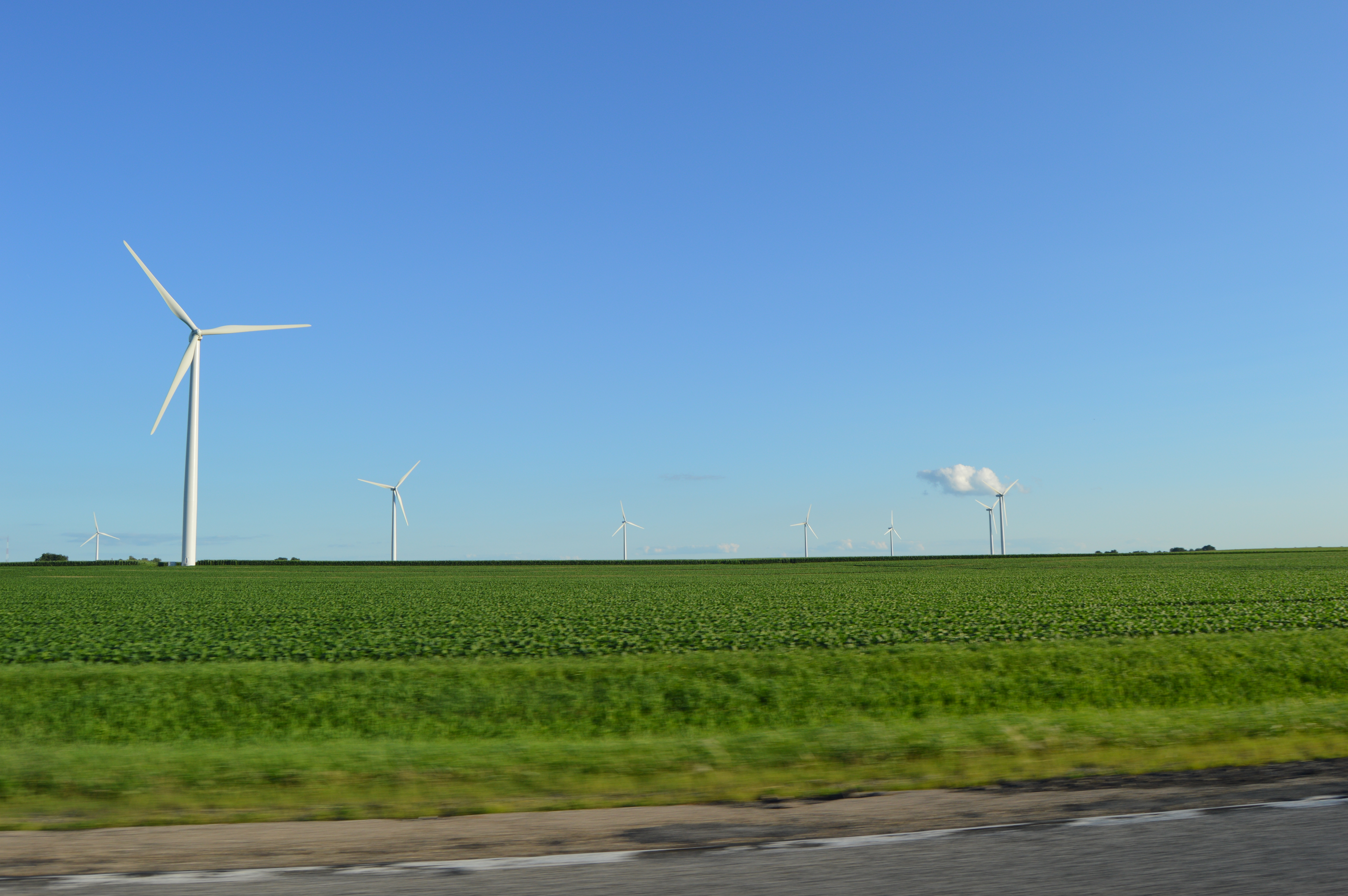
- Turbines at the Rail Splitter Wind Farm

- Location in Logan County

- Logan County's location in Illinois
- Country: United States
- State: Illinois
- County: Logan
- Established: November 7, 1865

Area
  - Total: 41.92 sq mi (108.6 km^{2})
  - Land: 41.92 sq mi (108.6 km^{2})
  - Water: 0 sq mi (0 km^{2}) 0%

Population (2020)
  - Total: 977
  - Density: 23.3/sq mi (9.00/km^{2})
- Time zone: UTC-6 (CST)
  - Summer (DST): UTC-5 (CDT)
- FIPS code: 17-107-56705

Orvil Township is located in Logan County, Illinois. As of the 2020 census, its population was 977 and it contained 471 housing units. Communities found in this township are Hartsburg and Emden.

== Geography ==
According to the 2021 census gazetteer files, Orvil Township has a total area of 41.92 square miles (108.57 km^{2}), all land.

== Demographics ==
Historical population
Census	Pop.	Note	%±
2000	1,116		—
2010	1,068		−4.3%
2020	977		−8.5%

As of the 2020 census there were 977 people, 470 households, and 310 families residing in the township. The population density was 23.30 inhabitants per square mile (9.00/km^{2}). There were 471 housing units at an average density of 11.23 per square mile (4.34/km^{2}). The racial makeup of the township was 95.09% White, 0.82% African American, 0.31% Native American, 0.41% Asian, 0.00% Pacific Islander, 0.51% from other races, and 2.87% from two or more races. Hispanic or Latino of any race were 0.92% of the population.

There were 470 households, out of which 36.40% had children under the age of 18 living with them, 45.53% were married couples living together, 9.15% had a female householder with no spouse present, and 34.04% were non-families. 26.80% of all households were made up of individuals, and 13.00% had someone living alone who was 65 years of age or older. The average household size was 2.52 and the average family size was 3.16.

According to the 2020 American Community Survey, township's age distribution consisted of 28.5% under the age of 18, 10.1% from 18 to 24, 25.9% from 25 to 44, 20.3% from 45 to 64, and 15.3% who were 65 years of age or older. The median age was 33.1 years. For every 100 females, there were 104 males. For every 100 females age 18 and over, there were 104.8 males.

The median income for a household in the township was $63,750, and the median income for a family was $75,789. Males had a median income of $34,735 versus $35,156 for females. The per capita income for the township was $29,217. About 2.3% of families and 2.2% of the population were below the poverty line, including 0.0% of those under age 18 and 9.4% of those age 65 or over.
