= Lake Fork, Illinois =

- Unincorporated community
- Location in Illinois Location in the United States
- Coordinates: 39°58′14″N 89°21′00″W
- Country: United States
- State: Illinois
- County: Logan
- Township: Mount Pulaski
- Elevation: 600 ft (180 m)
- Time zone: UTC-6 (CST)
  - Summer (DST): UTC-5 (CDT)
- Postal code: 62541
- Area code: 217
- GNIS feature ID: 411713

Lake Fork is an unincorporated community in Logan County, Illinois along Illinois Route 54.

== History ==
Lake Fork was laid out in 1881. The community is named after Buffalo Lake, a now-vanished prairie wetland in southern Logan County on the upper reaches of the Lake Fork of Salt Creek. A post office called Lake Fork has been in operation since 1881.
