= New Holland-Middletown Elementary School District 88 =

School district in Logan County, Illinois, United States

Address
- 75 1250th Street Middletown, Illinois, 62666; United States

District information
- Type: Public
- Grades: K–8
- NCES District ID: 1700103

Students and staff
- Students: 88

Other information
- Website: www.nhm88.com

New Holland-Middletown Elementary School District 88 (NH-M) is an elementary and middle school district headquartered in Middletown, Illinois.

The district is mostly in Logan County, where it includes Middletown and New Holland. The school district extends into Mason and Menard counties.

The high school for students assigned to District 88 schools is Lincoln Community High School.
