= Atlanta Township =

Atlanta Township may refer to the following townships in the United States:

- Atlanta Township, Logan County, Illinois
- Atlanta Township, Rice County, Kansas
- Atlanta Township, Becker County, Minnesota
