= Mount Fulcher, Illinois =

- Unincorporated community
- Location within Illinois Location within the United States
- Coordinates: 39°59′31″N 89°30′44″W
- Country: United States
- State: Illinois
- County: Logan
- Township: Hurlbut
- Elevation: 597 ft (182 m)
- Time zone: UTC-6 (Central (CST))
  - Summer (DST): UTC-5 (CDT)
- Area code: 217
- GNIS feature ID: 1720884

Mount Fulcher is an unincorporated community in Logan County, Illinois, United States. Mount Fulcher is located along Interstate 55 and former U.S. Route 66, northeast of Williamsville.

The elevated area on which the community sits is an end, or terminal moraine, a deposit of rocks and soil left by glaciers at the end of the last ice age. This large natural moraine was greatly reduced by the cutting of the railroad right-of-way between 1853 and 1945, and later by the cutting of right-of-way for the successive highways Illinois Route 4, U.S. Route 66, then U.S. Interstate 55.

The construction of this portion of U.S. Interstate 55 from 1973 to 1978 greatly reduced the height and area of Mount Fulcher. When U.S. Route 66 was the major highway, Mount Fulcher was a predominant feature of the local landscape, second only to nearby Elkhart Hill. Nevertheless, one can still readily observe a portion of the moraine to the east of the railroad and interstate, while the much larger portion of the moraine on the west side of the Interstate is clearly apparent.
