= Union, Logan County, Illinois =

Union, Illinois
- Unincorporated community
- Location within Illinois Location within the United States
- Coordinates: 40°17′15″N 89°22′01″W
- Country: United States
- State: Illinois
- County: Logan
- Township: Eminence
- Elevation: 722 ft (220 m)
- Time zone: UTC-6 (Central (CST))
  - Summer (DST): UTC-5 (CDT)
- Area code: 217
- GNIS feature ID: 423263

Union is an unincorporated community in Logan County, Illinois, United States. Union is located east of Emden and west of Atlanta.
