= Corwin Township =

Corwin Township may refer to the following townships in the United States:

- Corwin Township, Logan County, Illinois
- Corwin Township, Ida County, Iowa
- Corwin Township, Warren County, Ohio, former name of Salem Township, Warren County, Ohio
