= Mountjoy, Illinois =

- Unincorporated community
- Location within Illinois Location within the United States
- Coordinates: 40°17′12″N 89°16′55″W
- Country: United States
- State: Illinois
- County: Logan
- Township: Eminence
- Elevation: 725 ft (221 m)
- Time zone: UTC-6 (Central (CST))
  - Summer (DST): UTC-5 (CDT)
- Area code: 217
- GNIS feature ID: 423005

Mountjoy is an unincorporated community in Logan County, Illinois, United States. Mountjoy is northwest of Atlanta.
