= Middletown, Illinois =

Middletown
- Village
- Location in Logan County, Illinois
- Coordinates: 40°05′58″N 89°35′25″W
- Country: United States
- State: Illinois
- County: Logan
- Township: Corwin

Area
  - Total: 0.34 sq mi (0.88 km^{2})
  - Land: 0.34 sq mi (0.88 km^{2})
  - Water: 0 sq mi (0.00 km^{2})
- Elevation: 584 ft (178 m)

Population (2020)
  - Total: 329
  - Density: 963.5/sq mi (372.01/km^{2})
- Time zone: UTC-6 (CST)
  - Summer (DST): UTC-5 (CDT)
- ZIP code: 62666
- Area code: 217
- FIPS code: 17-48853
- GNIS feature ID: 2399334
- Website: middletownillinois.com

Middletown is a village in Logan County, Illinois, United States. As of the 2020 census, Middletown had a population of 329.

== History ==
Middletown, founded in 1832, is the oldest town in Logan County. However, it was not incorporated until 1900.

At one time, Middletown was considered as a location for the capital of Illinois. Middletown was a frequent overnight stop for legislators traveling between Springfield and Peoria in the mid-to-late 19th century. The Stage Coach Inn, located off the town square, is the oldest such wooden structure in Illinois. It is believed that Abraham Lincoln stayed at the Inn. Unfortunately, official records were destroyed in a fire many years ago.

The town does have at least one official and verified link to Abe Lincoln as he surveyed the site which would become the town during his early days surveying in Logan County.

Middletown is also home to the Knapp library and museum. The Knapp building is the oldest brick building in Logan county.

Several hot air balloon records were set in Middletown and the historic Vin Fiz, the first cross country flight, counts Middletown as one of the stops on that journey.

Middletown celebrated its Terquasquicentennial (175th birthday) during June 2007.

== Geography ==
According to the 2021 census gazetteer files, Middletown has a total area of 0.34 square miles (0.88 km^{2}), all land.

== Demographics ==
Historical population
Census	Pop.	Note	%±
1860	361		—
1870	223		−38.2%
1910	751		—
1920	587		−21.8%
1930	507		−13.6%
1940	496		−2.2%
1950	480		−3.2%
1960	543		13.1%
1970	626		15.3%
1980	503		−19.6%
1990	436		−13.3%
2000	434		−0.5%
2010	324		−25.3%
2020	329		1.5%
U.S. Decennial Census

As of the 2020 census there were 329 people, 91 households, and 65 families residing in the village. The population density was 964.81 inhabitants per square mile (372.52/km^{2}). There were 165 housing units at an average density of 483.87 per square mile (186.82/km^{2}). The racial makeup of the village was 95.74% White, 0.00% African American, 0.00% Native American, 0.00% Asian, 0.00% Pacific Islander, 0.00% from other races, and 4.26% from two or more races. Hispanic or Latino of any race were 1.82% of the population.

There were 91 households, out of which 29.7% had children under the age of 18 living with them, 53.85% were married couples living together, 10.99% had a female householder with no husband present, and 28.57% were non-families. 27.47% of all households were made up of individuals, and 16.48% had someone living alone who was 65 years of age or older. The average household size was 2.65 and the average family size was 2.33.

The village's age distribution consisted of 26.9% under the age of 18, 0.0% from 18 to 24, 26.4% from 25 to 44, 29.2% from 45 to 64, and 17.5% who were 65 years of age or older. The median age was 41.8 years. For every 100 females, there were 114.1 males. For every 100 females age 18 and over, there were 98.7 males.

The median income for a household in the village was $51,477, and the median income for a family was $62,917. Males had a median income of $27,188 versus $30,625 for females. The per capita income for the village was $24,532. About 6.2% of families and 11.3% of the population were below the poverty line, including 8.8% of those under age 18 and 8.1% of those age 65 or over.

== Education ==
New Holland-Middletown Elementary School District 88 operates the primary and middle school for the community. The high school for students assigned to District 88 schools is Lincoln Community High School.
