= Warrensburg-Latham Community Unit School District 11 =

School district in Illinois, United States

Coordinates: 39°55′57″N 89°4′6″W

Warrensburg-Latham Community Unit District 11 is a school district encompassing the villages of Warrensburg, Latham, parts of northwest Decatur, and parts of Forsyth, all in Illinois, and much of the surrounding countryside.

Most of the district is in Macon County, while parts extend into Logan County.

Warrensburg School and Latham School were separated schools. Latham's (defunct) mascot was the Rabbits. Warrensburg's elementary and middle school was formerly known as the Warrensburg Rebels and continued to be the Rebels after the merger of Warrensburg and Latham until 1995, due to racial issues with the confederate flag, the mascot was changed to the Cardinals after a vote of the student body. The Warrensburg High school (defunct) has always been the Cardinals, before and after the merger.

Both the Elementary/Middle School and the high school are located on the same plot of land on the northwest edge of Warrensburg. Their mascot is the Cardinal.

Famous alumni include Stephen Mason (guitarist with Jars of Clay), Hall of Fame jockey John L. Rotz (rider of the winners of two Triple Crown races, the 1962 Preakness Stakes on the horse Greek Money, and 1970 Belmont Stakes on the colt, High Echelon).

Warrensburg and Latham are both situated on Illinois Route 121 northwest of Decatur.
