= Postville Courthouse State Historic Site =

Coordinates: 40°8′50″N 89°22′49″W

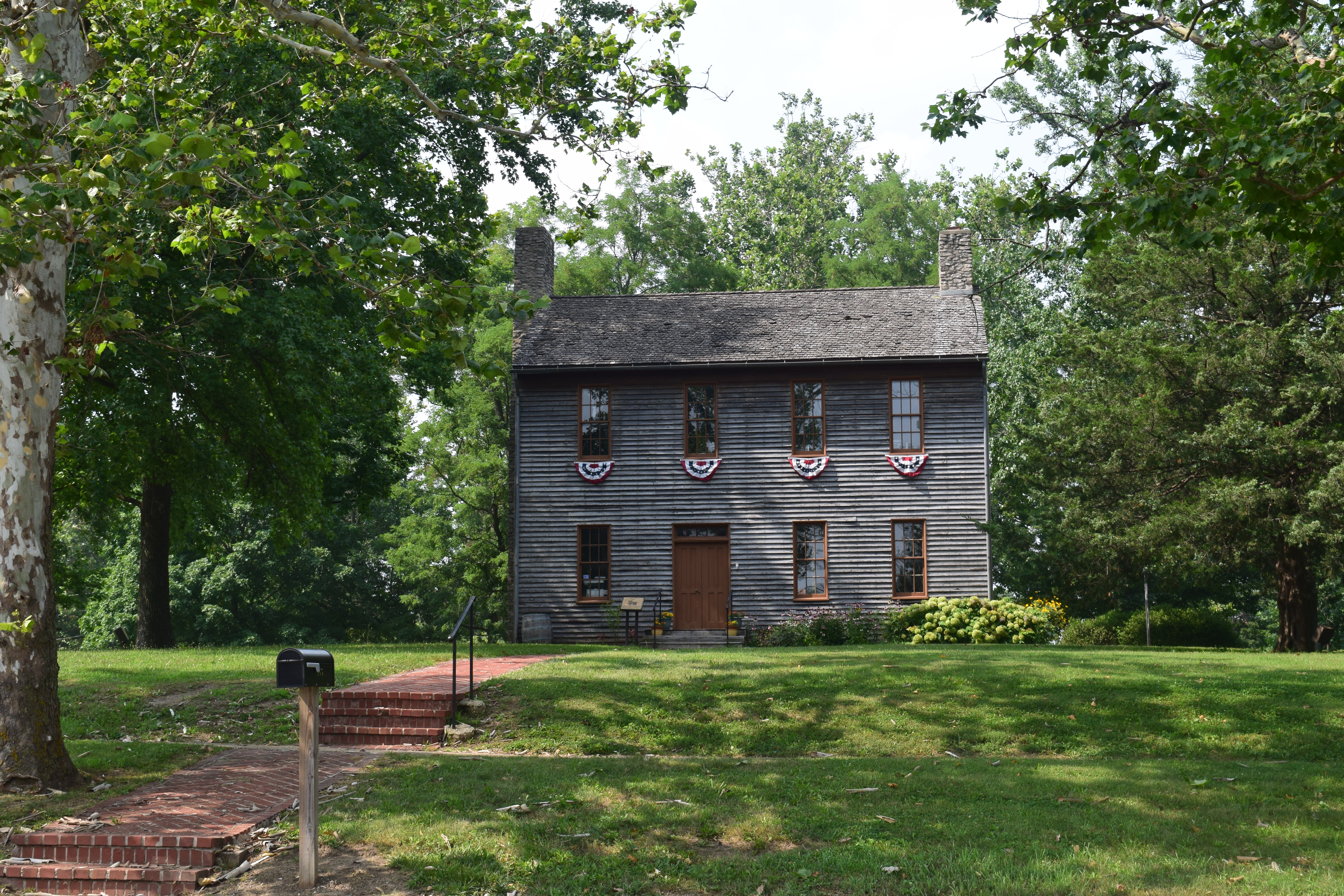
The replica courthouse in Lincoln

The Postville Courthouse State Historic Site is a replica county courthouse in Lincoln, Illinois, United States. The original frame courthouse was built in 1840 and later moved to Greenfield Village in Michigan; the current courthouse, which is a close replica of the first, was built in 1953. The building's unusual history is derived from its status as one of the courthouses used by lawyer Abraham Lincoln as he traveled the circuit of courtrooms in central Illinois. The courthouse replica is operated by the Illinois Historic Preservation Agency.

== The courthouse ==
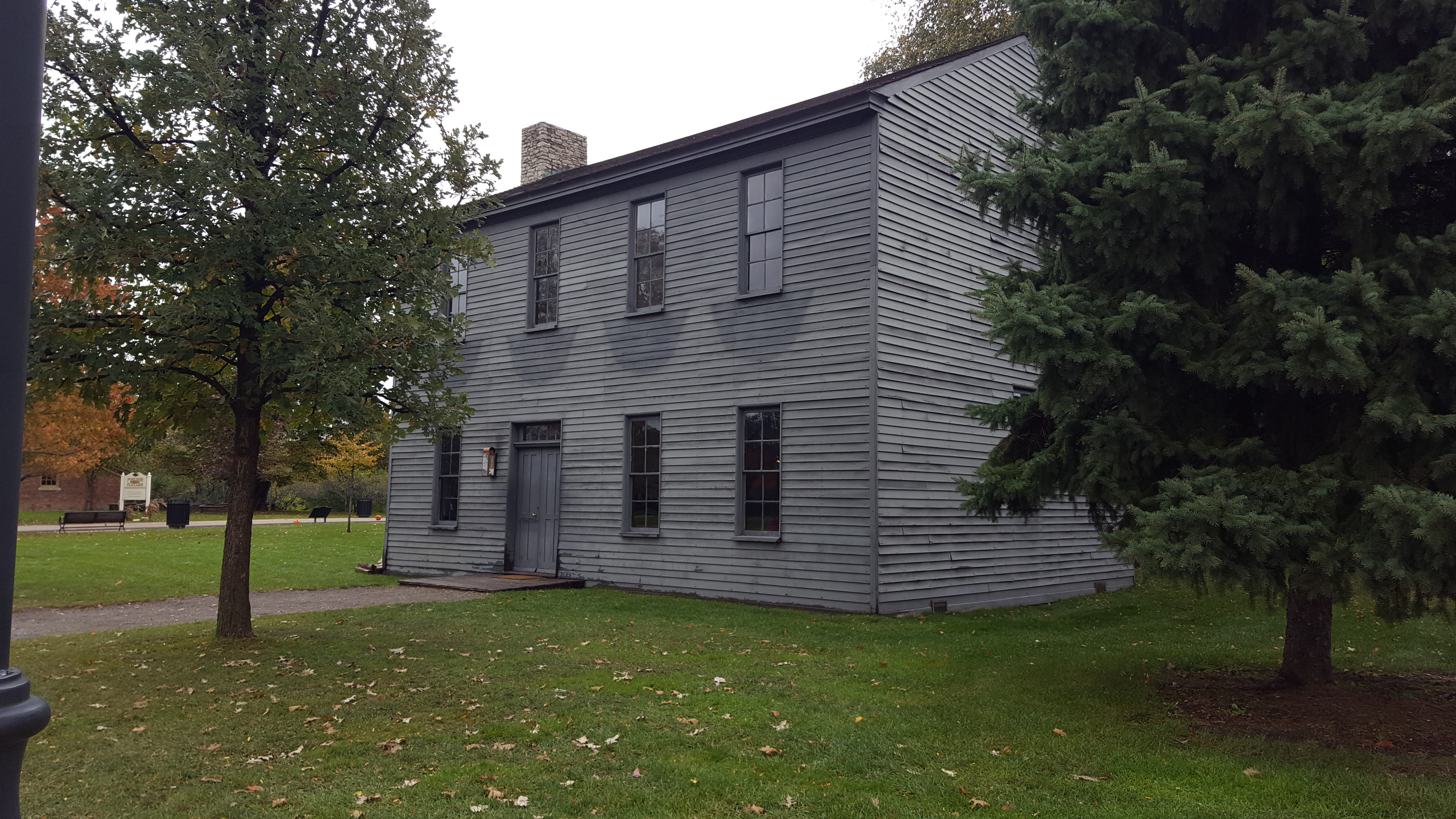
Original courthouse as reassembled in Greenfield Village, Dearborn, Michigan

Postville, a frontier settlement, was founded in 1835 by Russell Post. In 1839, the Illinois General Assembly chartered a new county from territory undergoing settlement. The new county was named Logan, and the county's first commissioners chose Postville, located close to the center of the new county, as the county seat.

A simple frame courthouse was raised in the following year. Built in an austere Federal style, the new courthouse resembled a private home. It contained not only a circuit courtroom, but also offices for the county clerk, the sheriff, the county recorder of deeds, the coroner, and the county surveyor. In addition, the county board of commissioners and the justice of the peace sat in the courtroom during their times of duty.

The Postville Courthouse served the people of Logan County for only eight years, from 1840 until 1848. In the latter year, the people of a nearby town, Mount Pulaski, Illinois, offered to take over the county seat in exchange for building a brick courthouse for the county's use. Concerned about the possibility of a courthouse fire and the destruction of the county's legal records, the county's leaders accepted the offer. The new courthouse, which still survives, is now the Mount Pulaski Courthouse State Historic Site.

== Abraham Lincoln ==
After seven years in Mount Pulaski from 1848 until 1855, the county seat was moved to a site by the newly built Chicago and Alton Railroad tracks. The new county seat, which was close to Postville, was named Lincoln, Illinois after the central Illinois lawyer. A fire in Lincoln in 1857 did indeed destroy Logan County's court records. As a result, little is known about the legal cases at Postville in which Lincoln was involved.

During the active use of the Postville courthouse, Lincoln was a young lawyer who was struggling to make a name for himself. The state of Illinois law at that time did not encourage specialization, and Lincoln would have taken any case for which he was hired.

Although law on the frontier was competitive, Lincoln made many friends in Logan County at this time. In 1846, the people of Central Illinois elected him to serve a term in the U.S. House of Representatives, and in 1853, the people of central Logan County named their new county seat for him. The new town of Lincoln grew so fast that by the 1860s, it had swallowed up nearby Postville, which was annexed and ceased to exist as an autonomous municipality.

Neighbors of the old Postville courthouse passed down stories. One well-corroborated tale says that the field across from the courthouse, then a vacant lot, was used by Lincoln and other young lawyers as a place to play town ball, a 19th-century variety of baseball, while the counselors were waiting for their cases to come up on the docket.

== Later history ==
After Postville became a neighborhood of Lincoln, the courthouse became a private home and gradually faded in importance. In 1929, inventor Henry Ford, eager to buy historic old buildings, purchased the old structure for $8,000. His contractors dismantled the frame structure, dug up the foundation, and moved everything to the Henry Ford Museum and Greenfield Village in Dearborn, Michigan; the reconstructed Postville Courthouse, built with original materials, still stands in Michigan today.

The people of Lincoln were troubled by losing this item from their heritage, and asked the state of Illinois to try to make up part of the loss. The state built a replica courthouse in 1953, using the dimensions and data of the original building. This replica, furnished as a courtroom of the 1840s, serves as the current Postville Courthouse State Historic Site.
