= Niantic, Illinois =

- Village
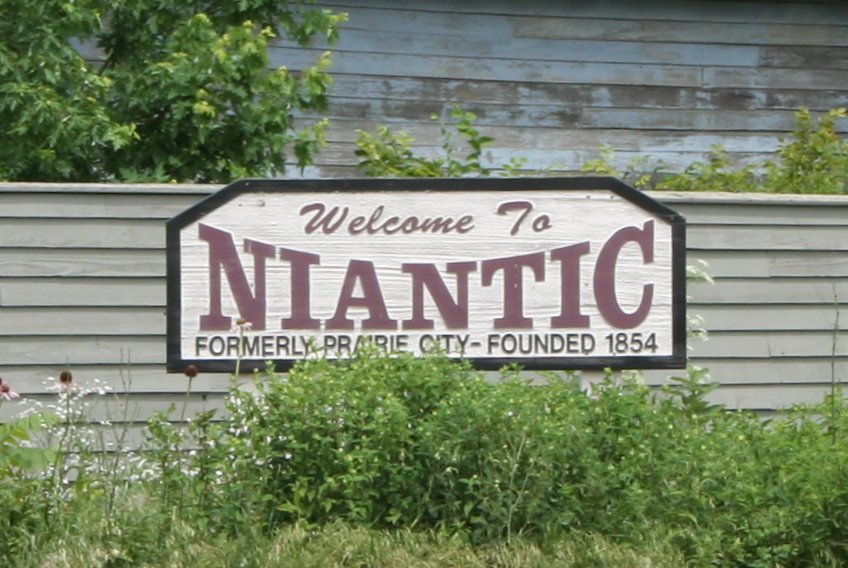
- Welcome sign

- Location in Macon County, Illinois
- Coordinates: 39°51′15″N 89°09′55″W
- Country: United States
- State: Illinois
- County: Macon
- Township: Niantic

Area
  - Total: 1.04 sq mi (2.69 km^{2})
  - Land: 1.04 sq mi (2.69 km^{2})
  - Water: 0 sq mi (0.00 km^{2})
- Elevation: 607 ft (185 m)

Population (2020)
  - Total: 612
  - Density: 588.9/sq mi (227.38/km^{2})
- Time zone: UTC-6 (CST)
  - Summer (DST): UTC-5 (CDT)
- ZIP code: 62551
- Area code: 217
- FIPS code: 17-52961
- GNIS feature ID: 2399496

Niantic is a village in Macon County, Illinois, United States. Its population was 612 at the 2020 census, down from 707 in 2010. It is included in the Decatur, Illinois Metropolitan Statistical Area.

== History ==
Niantic was among the earliest settled townships in the county. In 1825, Joseph Strickling, a native of Ohio, first settled in what is now Niantic Township. He erected the first log cabin in Niantic.

From 1825 to 1840, there were very few permanent settlers. The township's population varied on settlers setting up temporary homes on their way to the American West. The first schoolhouse was a log cabin built in 1847.

The Potawatomi Death Trail ran through Niantic in 1838.

== Geography ==
Niantic is located in western Macon Count. It is 12 miles (19 km) west of Decatur, the county seat, and 30 miles (48 km) east-northeast of Springfield, the state capital.

According to the 2021 census gazetteer files, Niantic has a total area of 1.04 square miles (2.69 km^{2}), all land. The village drains westward to southwest-flowing tributaries of the Sangamon River.

== Demographics ==
Historical population
Census	Pop.	Note	%±
1880	321		—
1890	639		99.1%
1900	654		2.3%
1910	685		4.7%
1920	613		−10.5%
1930	589		−3.9%
1940	625		6.1%
1950	625		0.0%
1960	629		0.6%
1970	705		12.1%
1980	761		7.9%
1990	647		−15.0%
2000	738		14.1%
2010	707		−4.2%
2020	612		−13.4%
U.S. Decennial Census

As of the 2020 census there were 612 people, 210 households, and 125 families residing in the village. The population density was 589.03 inhabitants per square mile (227.43/km^{2}). There were 271 housing units at an average density of 260.83 per square mile (100.71/km^{2}). The racial makeup of the village was 95.26% White, 0.16% African American, 0.49% Native American, 0.82% Asian, 0.00% Pacific Islander, 0.49% from other races, and 2.78% from two or more races. Hispanic or Latino of any race were 0.98% of the population.

There were 210 households, out of which 31.4% had children under the age of 18 living with them, 45.71% were married couples living together, 4.29% had a female householder with no husband present, and 40.48% were non-families. 33.33% of all households were made up of individuals, and 16.67% had someone living alone who was 65 years of age or older. The average household size was 4.09 and the average family size was 3.13.

The village's age distribution consisted of 37.7% under the age of 18, 6.5% from 18 to 24, 22.7% from 25 to 44, 18.6% from 45 to 64, and 14.5% who were 65 years of age or older. The median age was 33.3 years. For every 100 females, there were 142.4 males. For every 100 females age 18 and over, there were 123.5 males.

The median income for a household in the village was $53,500, and the median income for a family was $56,875. Males had a median income of $55,430 versus $29,583 for females. The per capita income for the village was $23,163. About 3.2% of families and 3.8% of the population were below the poverty line, including 0.9% of those under age 18 and 6.3% of those age 65 or over.

== Education ==
It is in the Sangamon Valley Community Unit School District 9.

Niantic is home to Sangamon Valley High School, which is part of Sangamon Valley C.U.S.D. #9.

== Notable people ==
- Art Phelan, third baseman for the Chicago Cubs and Cincinnati Reds; born in Niantic
- John L. Rotz, a jockey in National Museum of Racing and Hall of Fame; born in Niantic

== Gallery ==
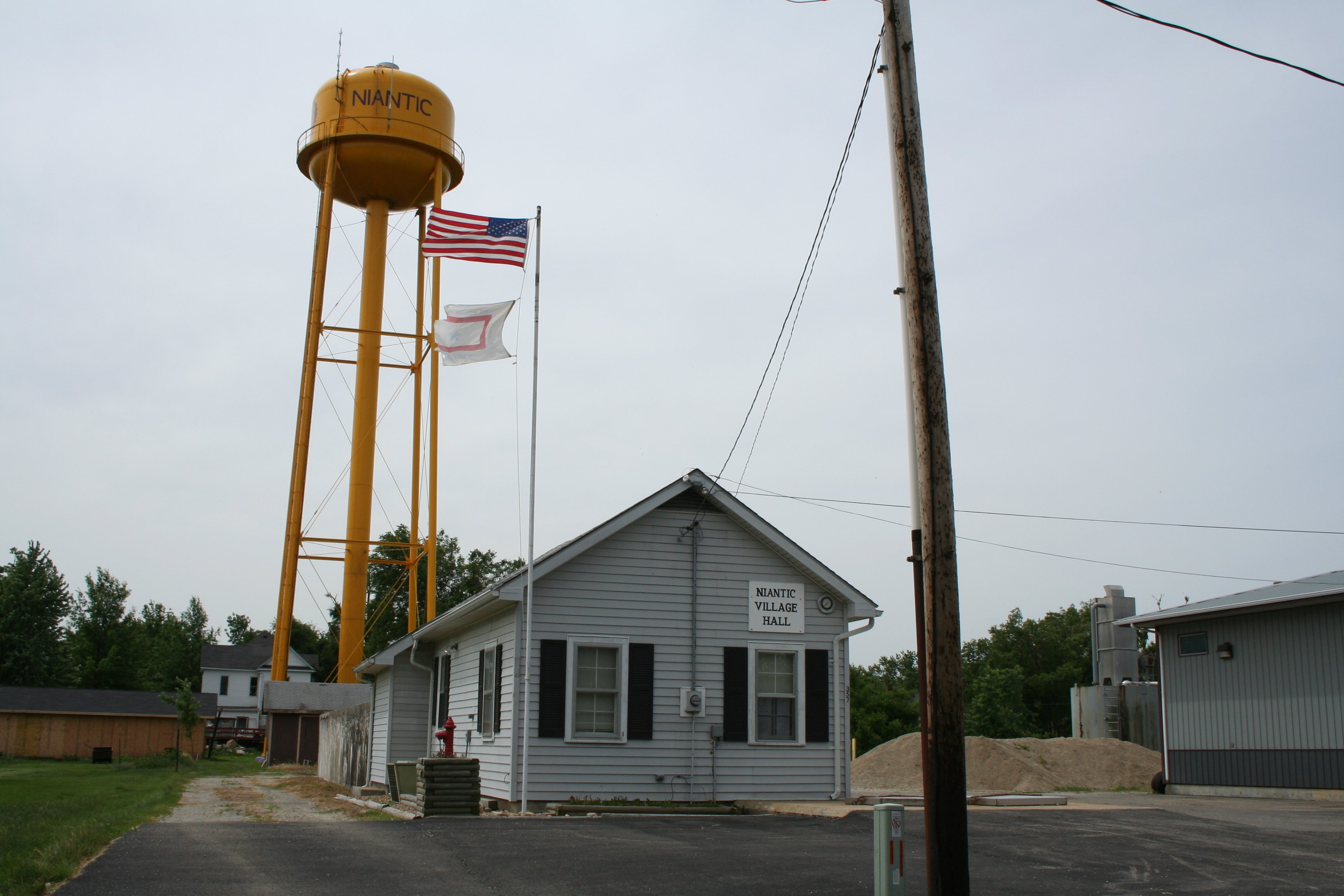
Niantic Village Hall and water tower

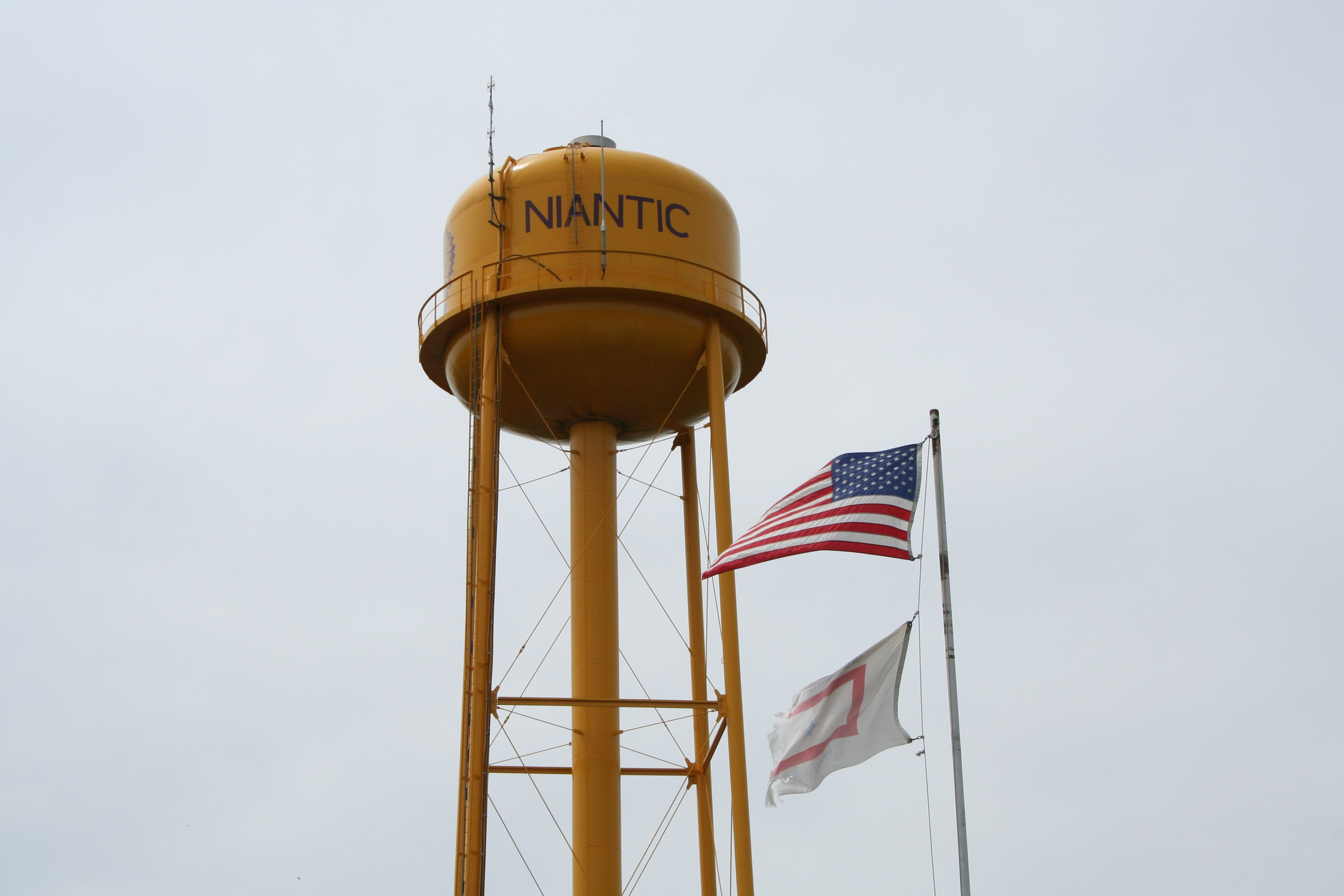
Niantic water tower

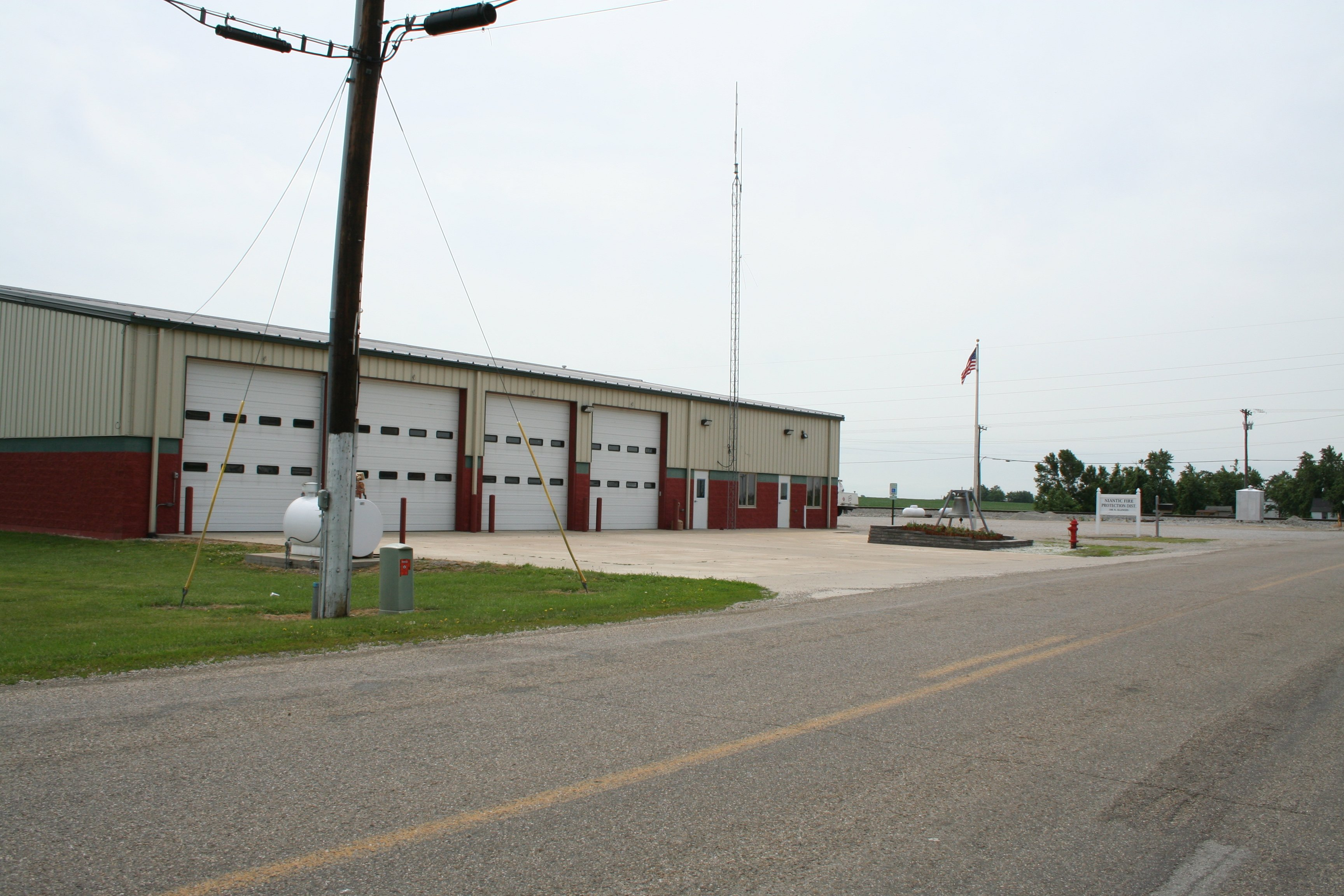
Niantic Fire Station

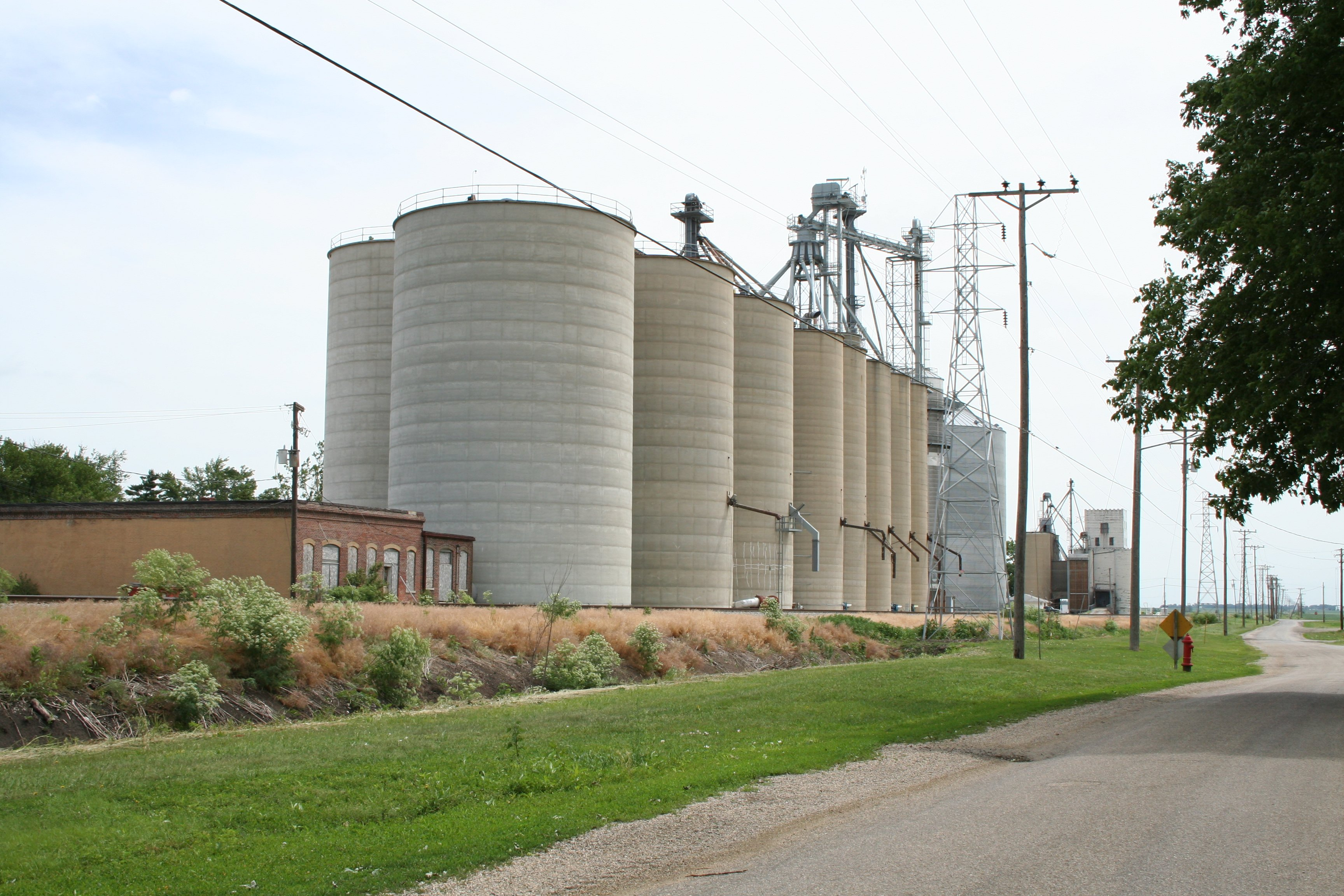
Niantic grain elevators
