= New Holland, Illinois =

- Village
- Location in Logan County, Illinois
- Coordinates: 40°11′01″N 89°34′57″W
- Country: United States
- State: Illinois
- County: Logan
- Township: Sheridan

Area
  - Total: 0.31 sq mi (0.80 km^{2})
  - Land: 0.31 sq mi (0.80 km^{2})
  - Water: 0 sq mi (0.00 km^{2})
- Elevation: 548 ft (167 m)

Population (2020)
  - Total: 275
  - Density: 886.4/sq mi (342.26/km^{2})
- Time zone: UTC-6 (CST)
  - Summer (DST): UTC-5 (CDT)
- ZIP code: 62671
- Area code: 217
- FIPS code: 17-52545
- GNIS feature ID: 2399467
- Website: www.new-holland-il.com

New Holland is a village in Logan County, Illinois, United States. As of the 2020 census, New Holland had a population of 275.

== Geography ==
According to the 2021 census gazetteer files, New Holland has a total area of 0.31 square miles (0.80 km^{2}), all land.

Illinois Route 10 runs through the village.

== Demographics ==
Historical population
Census	Pop.	Note	%±
1890	269		—
1900	358		33.1%
1910	387		8.1%
1920	457		18.1%
1930	353		−22.8%
1940	336		−4.8%
1950	343		2.1%
1960	314		−8.5%
1970	321		2.2%
1980	295		−8.1%
1990	330		11.9%
2000	318		−3.6%
2010	269		−15.4%
2020	275		2.2%
Decennial US Census

As of the 2020 census there were 275 people, 105 households, and 69 families residing in the village. The population density was 887.10 inhabitants per square mile (342.51/km^{2}). There were 123 housing units at an average density of 396.77 per square mile (153.19/km^{2}). The racial makeup of the village was 94.55% White, 0.00% African American, 0.00% Native American, 0.00% Asian, 0.00% Pacific Islander, 0.73% from other races, and 4.73% from two or more races. Hispanic or Latino of any race were 1.82% of the population.

There were 105 households, out of which 22.9% had children under the age of 18 living with them, 52.38% were married couples living together, 12.38% had a female householder with no husband present, and 34.29% were non-families. 28.57% of all households were made up of individuals, and 13.33% had someone living alone who was 65 years of age or older. The average household size was 3.03 and the average family size was 2.45.

The village's age distribution consisted of 24.1% under the age of 18, 1.6% from 18 to 24, 23% from 25 to 44, 36.3% from 45 to 64, and 15.2% who were 65 years of age or older. The median age was 47.4 years. For every 100 females, there were 83.6 males. For every 100 females age 18 and over, there were 75.7 males.

The median income for a household in the village was $77,083, and the median income for a family was $89,375. Males had a median income of $54,750 versus $31,750 for females. The per capita income for the village was $30,580. About 5.8% of families and 6.6% of the population were below the poverty line, including 11.3% of those under age 18 and 0.0% of those age 65 or over.

== Education ==
New Holland-Middletown Elementary School District 88 operates the elementary and middle school for the community. The high school for students assigned to District 88 schools is Lincoln Community High School.
