= Harristown Township, Macon County, Illinois =

Coordinates: 39°50′N 89°5′W

Harristown Township
- Township
- Location in Macon County

- Macon County's location in Illinois
- Country: United States
- State: Illinois
- County: Macon
- Settlement: November 8, 1859

Area
  - Total: 28.29 sq mi (73.3 km^{2})
  - Land: 28.09 sq mi (72.8 km^{2})
  - Water: 0.19 sq mi (0.49 km^{2}) 0.68%

Population (2020)
  - Total: 1,752
  - Density: 62.37/sq mi (24.08/km^{2})
- Time zone: UTC-6 (CST)
  - Summer (DST): UTC-5 (CDT)
- FIPS code: 17-115-33240

Harristown Township is located in Macon County, Illinois, USA. As of the 2020 census, its population was 1,752 and it contained 790 housing units.

== Cities and towns ==
- Harristown

== Adjacent townships ==
- Illini Township (north)
- Hickory Point Township (northeast)
- Decatur Township (east)
- South Wheatland Township (southeast)
- Blue Mound Township (south)
- Mosquito Township, Christian County (southwest)
- Niantic Township (west and northwest)

== Geography ==
According to the 2021 census gazetteer files, Harristown Township has a total area of 28.29 square miles (73.27 km^{2}), of which 28.09 square miles (72.75 km^{2}) (or 99.32%) is land and 0.19 square miles (0.49 km^{2}) (or 0.68%) is water.

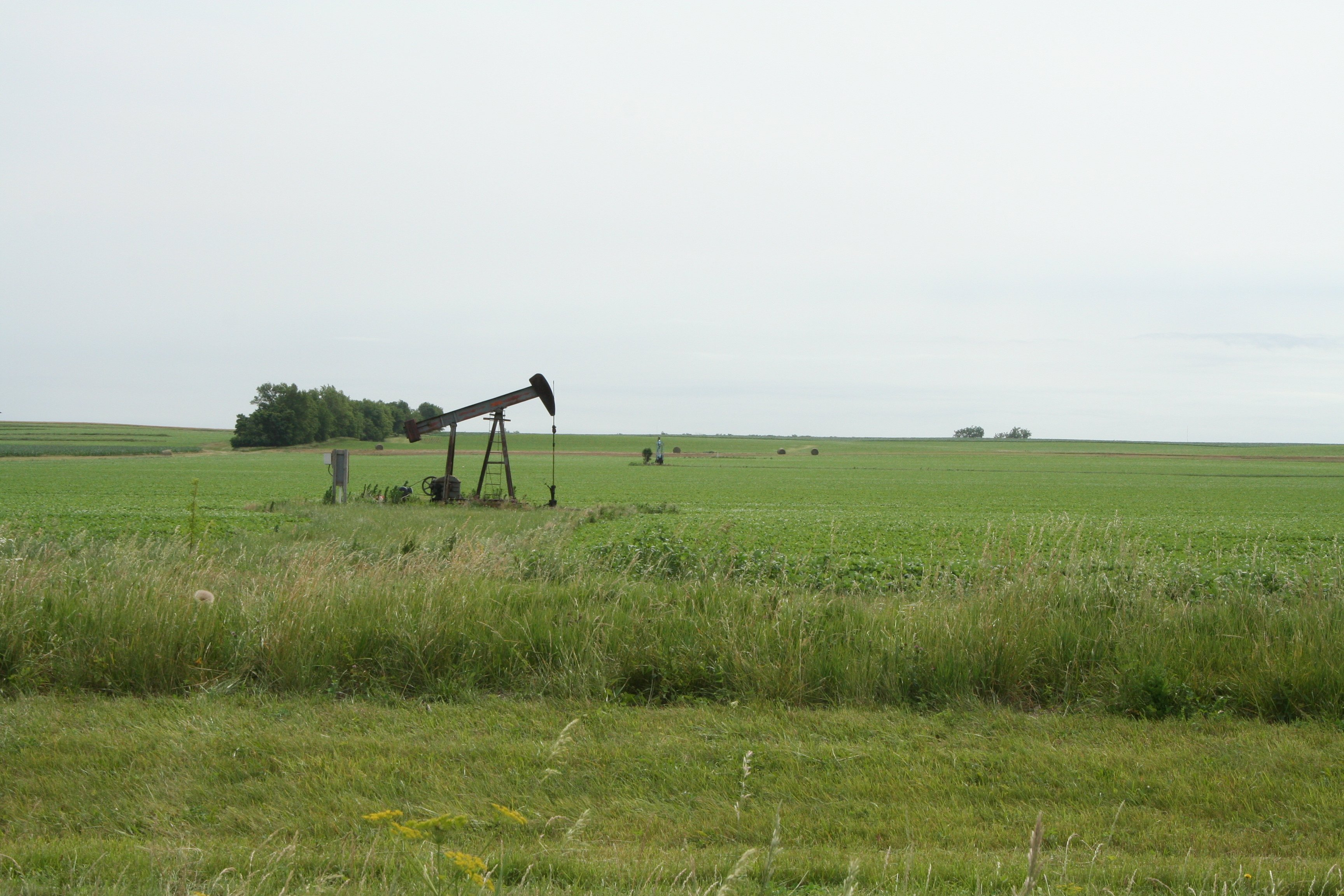
Oil wells in Harristown Township

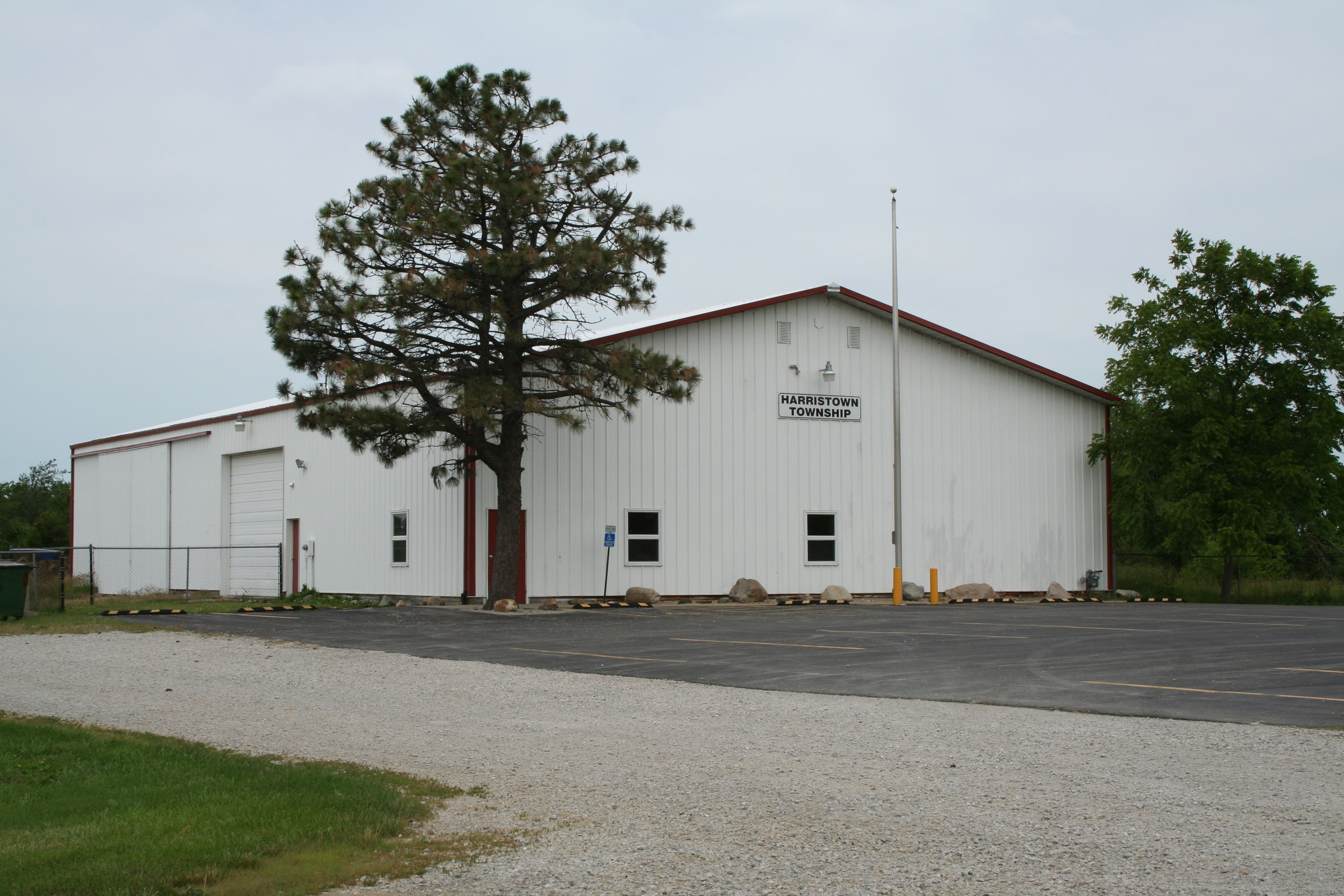
Harristown Township building

== Demographics ==
As of the 2020 census there were 1,752 people, 768 households, and 497 families residing in the township. The population density was 61.94 inhabitants per square mile (23.92/km^{2}). There were 790 housing units at an average density of 27.93 per square mile (10.78/km^{2}). The racial makeup of the township was 95.32% White, 0.51% African American, 0.11% Native American, 0.29% Asian, 0.06% Pacific Islander, 0.51% from other races, and 3.20% from two or more races. Hispanic or Latino of any race were 1.08% of the population.

There were 768 households, out of which 17.60% had children under the age of 18 living with them, 55.34% were married couples living together, 6.38% had a female householder with no spouse present, and 35.29% were non-families. 30.60% of all households were made up of individuals, and 14.60% had someone living alone who was 65 years of age or older. The average household size was 2.24 and the average family size was 2.79.

According to the 2020 American Community Survey, township's age distribution consisted of 20.2% under the age of 18, 5.3% from 18 to 24, 19.2% from 25 to 44, 31.2% from 45 to 64, and 24.1% who were 65 years of age or older. The median age was 49.6 years. For every 100 females, there were 95.5 males. For every 100 females age 18 and over, there were 94.2 males.

The median income for a household in the township was $60,536, and the median income for a family was $71,518. Males had a median income of $59,583 versus $29,390 for females. The per capita income for the township was $33,062. About 6.2% of families and 10.4% of the population were below the poverty line, including 14.6% of those under age 18 and 8.7% of those age 65 or over.

Historical population
Census	Pop.	Note	%±
2000	1,913		—
2010	1,921		0.4%
2020	1,752		−8.8%
U.S. Decennial Census
