= Art Phelan =

American baseball player (1887–1964)

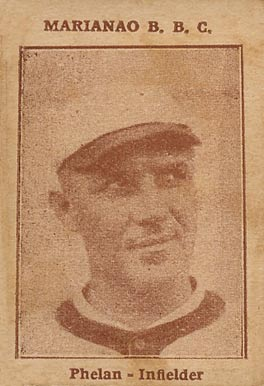
- Third baseman
- Born: August 14, 1887; Niantic, Illinois, U.S.
- Died: December 27, 1964 (aged 77); Fort Worth, Texas, U.S.
- Batted: Right Threw: Right

MLB debut
- June 25, 1910, for the Cincinnati Reds

Last MLB appearance
- October 3, 1915, for the Chicago Cubs

MLB statistics
- Batting average: .236
- Home runs: 8
- Runs batted in: 131
- Stats at Baseball Reference

Teams
- Cincinnati Reds (1910, 1912); Chicago Cubs (1913–1915)

Arthur Thomas Phelan (August 14, 1887 – December 27, 1964) was an American professional baseball infielder in the Major Leagues from 1910 to 1915, who played for the Chicago Cubs and Cincinnati Reds.
