= Chuck Verderber =

American dentist and former college basketball player

Personal information
- Born: November 3, 1959
- Listed height: 6 ft 6 in (1.98 m)
- Listed weight: 220 lb (100 kg)

Career information
- High school: Lincoln (Lincoln, Illinois)
- College: Kentucky (1978–1982)
- NBA draft: 1982: 7th round, 145th overall pick
- Drafted by: Chicago Bulls
- Position: Forward
- Number: 34

Career history
- 1982: Obradoiro CAB

Career highlights
- McDonald's All-American (1978)
- Stats at Basketball Reference

Charles Verderber (born November 3, 1959) is an American former professional basketball player. He played college basketball for the Kentucky Wildcats and was the team's captain during his junior and senior seasons. After graduating, Verderber was drafted by the Chicago Bulls in the seventh round of the 1982 NBA draft, and played one season professionally for Obradoiro CAB in Spain. He later became a dentist.

== Basketball career ==
=== High school career ===
Verderber played for Lincoln Community High School where he was named a McDonald's All-American. Over his high school career, he had 2,032 points and 1,014 rebounds for the Railsplitters, who went 28–2 and won a sectional in 1978. In 2017, the Chicago Tribune named him one of Illinois's 100 best high school basketball players ever.

=== College career ===
Verderber played college basketball at the University of Kentucky for 1978–1982. In 113 games for the Wildcats, he averaged 5.1 points and 3.5 rebounds per game. In 1985, the Lexington Herald-Leader reported that he was one of 26 Kentucky basketball players who said they received cash payments while playing for the Wildcats.

=== Professional career ===
After graduating, Verderber was selected with the 145th pick in the 7th round of the 1982 NBA draft by the Chicago Bulls although he never joined the team. Instead, he signed with Spanish club Obradoiro CAB. His season in Spain was cut short after he tore his achilles tendon in November 1982. He underwent a successful surgery on November 7 to repair the damage. At the time of his injury, he was the fifth leading scorer in the league, averaging 25.6 points per game.

== After basketball ==
Verderber enrolled in the University of Kentucky College of Dentistry in 1983 after his Achilles injury. As of 2019, he had been a dentist in St. Albans, Vermont for over 30 years.

== Personal life ==
Verderber's sister, Barb Verderber, was inducted in to the Illinois Basketball Coaches Association Hall of Fame in 2008.
