= Warrensburg, Illinois =

- Village
- Location in Macon County, Illinois
- Coordinates: 39°55′55″N 89°03′46″W
- Country: United States
- State: Illinois
- County: Macon
- Township: Illini

Area
  - Total: 0.73 sq mi (1.89 km^{2})
  - Land: 0.73 sq mi (1.89 km^{2})
  - Water: 0 sq mi (0.00 km^{2})
- Elevation: 705 ft (215 m)

Population (2020)
  - Total: 1,110
  - Density: 1,524/sq mi (588.3/km^{2})
- Time zone: UTC-6 (CST)
  - Summer (DST): UTC-5 (CDT)
- ZIP code: 62573
- Area code: 217
- FIPS code: 17-78916
- GNIS feature ID: 2400095
- Website: warrensburgillinois.wpcomstaging.com

Warrensburg is a village in Macon County, Illinois, United States. Its population was 1,110 at the 2020 census, down from 1,201 in 2010. It is included in the Decatur, Illinois Metropolitan Statistical Area. Warrensburg was established in 1841.

== Geography ==
Warrensburg is located in northwestern Macon County. Illinois Route 121 passes through the northeast side of the village, leading southeast 9 miles (14 km) to Decatur, the county seat, and northwest 14 miles (23 km) to Mount Pulaski.

According to the U.S. Census Bureau, Warrensburg has a total area of 0.73 square miles (1.89 km^{2}), all land.

== Demographics ==
Historical population
Census	Pop.	Note	%±
1900	503		—
1910	504		0.2%
1920	490		−2.8%
1930	517		5.5%
1940	456		−11.8%
1950	549		20.4%
1960	681		24.0%
1970	811		19.1%
1980	1,372		69.2%
1990	1,274		−7.1%
2000	1,289		1.2%
2010	1,210		−6.1%
2020	1,110		−8.3%
U.S. Decennial Census

=== 2020 census ===
As of the 2020 census there were 1,110 people, 447 households, and 361 families residing in the village. The population density was 1,524.73 inhabitants per square mile (588.70/km^{2}). The racial makeup of the village was 92.70% White, 0.45% African American, 0.09% Native American, 0.18% Asian, 0.00% Pacific Islander, 0.81% from other races, and 5.77% from two or more races. Hispanic or Latino of any race were 1.62% of the population.

There were 447 households, out of which 35.1% had children under the age of 18 living with them, 51.68% were married couples living together, 23.49% had a female householder with no husband present, and 19.24% were non-families. 18.12% of all households were made up of individuals, and 10.96% had someone living alone who was 65 years of age or older. The average household size was 3.16 and the average family size was 2.80.

The village's age distribution consisted of 25.5% under the age of 18, 14.9% from 18 to 24, 21.1% from 25 to 44, 18.9% from 45 to 64, and 19.5% who were 65 years of age or older. The median age was 37.1 years. For every 100 females, there were 90.2 males. For every 100 females age 18 and over, there were 74.9 males.

The median income for a household in the village was $62,917, and the median income for a family was $74,821. Males had a median income of $45,903 versus $30,417 for females. The per capita income for the village was $26,567. About 5.3% of families and 7.4% of the population were below the poverty line, including 4.7% of those under age 18 and 8.9% of those age 65 or over.

There were 519 housing units, of which 11.9% were vacant. The homeowner vacancy rate was 2.0% and the rental vacancy rate was 19.2%.

Racial composition as of the 2020 census
Race	Number	Percent
White	1,029	92.7%
Black or African American	5	0.5%
American Indian and Alaska Native	1	0.1%
Asian	2	0.2%
Native Hawaiian and Other Pacific Islander	0	0.0%
Some other race	9	0.8%
Two or more races	64	5.8%
Hispanic or Latino (of any race)	18	1.6%

== Education ==
It is in the Warrensburg-Latham Community Unit School District 11.

== Notable people ==
- John L. Rotz, Hall of Fame jockey, winner of 1970 Belmont Stakes
- Margie Wright, Hall of Fame softball coach
