= Chester Township, Logan County, Illinois =

Coordinates: 40°05′34″N 89°18′47″W

Chester Township
- Township
- Location in Logan County

- Logan County's location in Illinois
- Country: United States
- State: Illinois
- County: Logan
- Established: November 7, 1865

Area
  - Total: 38.32 sq mi (99.2 km^{2})
  - Land: 38.30 sq mi (99.2 km^{2})
  - Water: 0.02 sq mi (0.052 km^{2}) 0.05%

Population (2020)
  - Total: 654
  - Density: 17.1/sq mi (6.59/km^{2})
- Time zone: UTC-6 (CST)
  - Summer (DST): UTC-5 (CDT)
- FIPS code: 17-107-13126

Chester Township is located in Logan County, Illinois. As of the 2020 census, its population was 654 and it contained 265 housing units. Chester Township changed its name from Madison Township sometime prior to 1921.

== Geography ==
According to the 2021 census gazetteer files, Chester Township has a total area of 38.32 square miles (99.25 km^{2}), of which 38.30 square miles (99.20 km^{2}) (or 99.95%) is land and 0.02 square miles (0.05 km^{2}) (or 0.05%) is water.

== Demographics ==
As of the 2020 census there were 654 people, 206 households, and 162 families residing in the township. The population density was 17.07 inhabitants per square mile (6.59/km^{2}). There were 265 housing units at an average density of 6.92 per square mile (2.67/km^{2}). The racial makeup of the township was 95.72% White, 0.76% African American, 0.00% Native American, 0.61% Asian, 0.00% Pacific Islander, 0.61% from other races, and 2.29% from two or more races. Hispanic or Latino of any race were 1.68% of the population.

There were 206 households, out of which 35.40% had children under the age of 18 living with them, 65.05% were married couples living together, 0.00% had a female householder with no spouse present, and 21.36% were non-families. 21.40% of all households were made up of individuals, and 16.50% had someone living alone who was 65 years of age or older. The average household size was 2.73 and the average family size was 3.15.

According to the 2020 American Community Survey, township's age distribution consisted of 29.9% under the age of 18, 1.4% from 18 to 24, 15.1% from 25 to 44, 29.8% from 45 to 64, and 23.7% who were 65 years of age or older. The median age was 45.8 years. For every 100 females, there were 103.7 males. For every 100 females age 18 and over, there were 101.6 males.

The median income for a household in the township was $78,750, and the median income for a family was $91,250. Males had a median income of $58,000 versus $34,750 for females. The per capita income for the township was $38,517. About 3.1% of families and 6.4% of the population were below the poverty line, including 14.3% of those under age 18 and 0.0% of those age 65 or over.

Historical population
Census	Pop.	Note	%±
2000	723		—
2010	669		−7.5%
2020	654		−2.2%
U.S. Decennial Census
