= Lincoln Community High School =

Location
- 1000 Railer Way; Lincoln, Illinois 62656; United States

Information
- School district: Lincoln Community High School District #404
- Principal: David Helm
- Teaching staff: 60.57 (FTE)
- Grades: 8–12
- Enrollment: 779 (2023-2024)
- Student to teacher ratio: 12.86
- Colors: Green and Red
- Athletics: IHSA
- Athletics conference: Central State 8
- Mascot: Railsplitters
- Website: www.lchsrailers.org

Lincoln Community High School is located at 1000 Railer Way in Lincoln, Illinois, United States. It is the only high school of the Lincoln Community High School District #404.

The school district, mostly in Logan County, covers Lincoln, Beason, Broadwell, Middletown, and New Holland. It extends into DeWitt, Mason, and Menard counties.

== Sports ==
The school is a traditional power in boys' basketball, music, and individual events (speech team) in Central Illinois. The Railsplitters were Sectional Champions (state finalists) in the state basketball tournament in 1929, 1951, 1955, 1969, 1970, 1973, 1978, 1980, 1999, 2003, 2005, 2007, and 2014. In 2014 the Railers were State runners-up, losing to Morgan Park in the finals. State finalists prior to 1972 was the final 16 in a single-class system, state finalists appearances from 1973 to 2007 were as being in the final 16 of the large school class in a two-class system, and beginning in 2008, Lincoln competes in class 3A in a four-class system with 4A containing the largest schools and the state finalists being the final eight in each class.

The Lady Railer Girls Basketball Team is the only sports team in LCHS history with a state championship trophy. The ladies placed 2nd in 2023 and were determined to return (all starters were juniors) and win the state trophy in 2024, which they did, complete with an undefeated season.

Floyd Bee coached the wrestling team for over 30 years, managing a winning season each time. The wrestling program has continued to have a winning season each year since. The girls' basketball team finished second in state in 1978 and fourth in 1999.

Dan "Mac" McLaughlin led the LCHS Speech program for over 25 years in the 1970s, 1980s, and 1990s. During his tenure as coach of the LCHS Speech team, Mac was able to build the program into a consistent state-wide powerhouse that produced several individual state champions and, in 1981, led the Speech team to Lincoln Community High School's first team state championship in history. Mac also led several Group Interpretation teams to yearly state contention, placing in the top 3 in the state several years.

The last time the boys' football team was in the playoffs was in the 2023-24 school year. The football team qualified for the state playoffs in the 1975-76 and 1984-85 school years. The boys' football team is currently classified as class 4A in an eight-class system.

== Academics ==
The school is consistently at or close to the state average on standardized tests.

== Notable alumni ==
- Brian Cook (1999) – former NBA player and Illinois Fighting Illini
- Norm Cook (1973) – former NBA player and Kansas Jayhawk, father of Brian Cook
- Andy King – former NFL player
- Kelly McEvers – journalist and co-host of All Things Considered on NPR
- Dick Reichle – former MLB player (Boston Red Sox)
- Kevin Seitzer – former MLB third baseman
- Tony Semple – former NFL guard and long snapper
- Chuck Verderber (1978) – former basketball player
