= Prairie Creek Township, Logan County, Illinois =

Coordinates: 40°16′30″N 89°33′00″W

Prairie Creek Township
- Township
- Location in Logan County

- Logan County's location in Illinois
- Country: United States
- State: Illinois
- County: Logan
- Established: November 7, 1865

Area
  - Total: 42.28 sq mi (109.5 km^{2})
  - Land: 42.28 sq mi (109.5 km^{2})
  - Water: 0 sq mi (0 km^{2}) 0%

Population (2020)
  - Total: 415
  - Density: 9.82/sq mi (3.79/km^{2})
- Time zone: UTC-6 (CST)
  - Summer (DST): UTC-5 (CDT)
- FIPS code: 17-107-61574

Prairie Creek Township is located in Logan County, Illinois. As of the 2020 census, its population was 415 and it contained 176 housing units.

== Geography ==
According to the 2021 census gazetteer files, Prairie Creek Township has a total area of 42.28 square miles (109.50 km^{2}), all land.

=== Major highways ===
- US 136
- CR 3
- CR 14
- CR 16
- CR 18
- CR 22
- CR 28
- CR 34E

== Demographics ==
As of the 2020 census there were 415 people, 124 households, and 92 families residing in the township. The population density was 9.82 inhabitants per square mile (3.79/km^{2}). There were 176 housing units at an average density of 4.16 per square mile (1.61/km^{2}). The racial makeup of the township was 93.25% White, 0.48% African American, 0.24% Native American, 0.24% Asian, 0.00% Pacific Islander, 0.72% from other races, and 5.06% from two or more races. Hispanic or Latino of any race were 2.65% of the population.

There were 124 households, out of which 28.20% had children under the age of 18 living with them, 66.13% were married couples living together, 8.06% had a female householder with no spouse present, and 25.81% were non-families. 16.90% of all households were made up of individuals, and 11.30% had someone living alone who was 65 years of age or older. The average household size was 2.15 and the average family size was 2.40.

According to the 2020 American Community Survey, township's age distribution consisted of 14.3% under the age of 18, 3.8% from 18 to 24, 32.7% from 25 to 44, 28.5% from 45 to 64, and 20.7% who were 65 years of age or older. The median age was 44.8 years. For every 100 females, there were 115 males. For every 100 females age 18 and over, there were 112.7 males.

The median income for a household in the township was $86,923, and the median income for a family was $93,750. Males had a median income of $46,071 versus $48,646 for females. The per capita income for the township was $39,855. None of the population was below the poverty line.

Historical population
Census	Pop.	Note	%±
2000	533		—
2010	487		−8.6%
2020	415		−14.8%
U.S. Decennial Census
