= Hurlbut Township, Logan County, Illinois =

Coordinates: 40°00′45″N 89°32′10″W

Hurlbut Township
- Township
- Location in Logan County

- Logan County's location in Illinois
- Country: United States
- State: Illinois
- County: Logan
- Established: November 7, 1865

Area
  - Total: 25.18 sq mi (65.2 km^{2})
  - Land: 25.15 sq mi (65.1 km^{2})
  - Water: 0.03 sq mi (0.078 km^{2}) 0.12%

Population (2020)
  - Total: 338
  - Density: 12.1/sq mi (4.7/km^{2})
- Time zone: UTC-6 (CST)
  - Summer (DST): UTC-5 (CDT)
- FIPS code: 17-107-36789

Hurlbut Township is located in Logan County, Illinois. As of the 2020 census, its population was 338 and it contained 136 housing units.

== Geography ==
According to the 2021 census gazetteer files, Hurlbut Township has a total area of 25.18 square miles (65.22 km^{2}), of which 25.15 square miles (65.14 km^{2}) (or 99.88%) is land and 0.03 square miles (0.08 km^{2}) (or 0.12%) is water.

== Demographics ==
As of the 2020 census there were 338 people, 206 households, and 164 families residing in the township. The population density was 13.42 inhabitants per square mile (5.18/km^{2}). There were 136 housing units at an average density of 5.40 per square mile (2.08/km^{2}). The racial makeup of the township was 94.67% White, 0.59% African American, 0.30% Native American, 1.48% Asian, 0.00% Pacific Islander, 0.00% from other races, and 2.96% from two or more races. Hispanic or Latino of any race were 0.89% of the population.

There were 206 households, out of which 53.90% had children under the age of 18 living with them, 73.79% were married couples living together, 0.97% had a female householder with no spouse present, and 20.39% were non-families. 19.90% of all households were made up of individuals, and 4.40% had someone living alone who was 65 years of age or older. The average household size was 2.90 and the average family size was 3.37.

According to the 2020 American Community Survey, township's age distribution consisted of 38.5% under the age of 18, 0.5% from 18 to 24, 27.4% from 25 to 44, 26.8% from 45 to 64, and 6.7% who were 65 years of age or older. The median age was 38.6 years. For every 100 females, there were 100 males. For every 100 females age 18 and over, there were 100.8 males.

The median income for a household in the township was $100,556, and the median income for a family was $116,019. Males had a median income of $62,159 versus $56,000 for females. The per capita income for the township was $41,401. About 0.6% of families and 0.8% of the population were below the poverty line, including 0.0% of those under age 18 and 2.5% of those age 65 or over.

Historical population
Census	Pop.	Note	%±
2000	367		—
2010	305		−16.9%
2020	338		10.8%
U.S. Decennial Census
