= Atlanta Township, Logan County, Illinois =

Coordinates: 40°14′56″N 89°12′35″W

Atlanta Township
- Township
- Location in Logan County

- Logan County's location in Illinois
- Country: United States
- State: Illinois
- County: Logan
- Established: November 7, 1865

Area
  - Total: 24.20 sq mi (62.7 km^{2})
  - Land: 24.18 sq mi (62.6 km^{2})
  - Water: 0.02 sq mi (0.052 km^{2}) 0.07%

Population (2020)
  - Total: 1,906
  - Density: 78.83/sq mi (30.43/km^{2})
- Time zone: UTC-6 (CST)
  - Summer (DST): UTC-5 (CDT)
- FIPS code: 17-107-02765
- Website: atlantaillinoistownship.org

Atlanta Township is located in Logan County, Illinois. As of the 2020 census, its population was 1,906 and it contained 871 housing units.

== Geography ==
According to the 2021 census gazetteer files, Atlanta Township has a total area of 24.20 square miles (62.68 km^{2}), of which 24.18 square miles (62.63 km^{2}) (or 99.93%) is land and 0.02 square miles (0.05 km^{2}) (or 0.07%) is water.

== Demographics ==
As of the 2020 census there were 1,906 people, 898 households, and 659 families residing in the township. The population density was 78.77 inhabitants per square mile (30.41/km^{2}). There were 871 housing units at an average density of 35.99 per square mile (13.90/km^{2}). The racial makeup of the township was 94.86% White, 0.26% African American, 0.16% Native American, 0.21% Asian, 0.00% Pacific Islander, 0.47% from other races, and 4.04% from two or more races. Hispanic or Latino of any race were 2.05% of the population.

There were 898 households, out of which 35.00% had children under the age of 18 living with them, 54.57% were married couples living together, 17.59% had a female householder with no spouse present, and 26.61% were non-families. 21.30% of all households were made up of individuals, and 9.40% had someone living alone who was 65 years of age or older. The average household size was 2.60 and the average family size was 3.01.

According to the 2020 American Community Survey, township's age distribution consisted of 27.2% under the age of 18, 12.4% from 18 to 24, 22.6% from 25 to 44, 23.7% from 45 to 64, and 14.0% who were 65 years of age or older. The median age was 35.8 years. For every 100 females, there were 92.5 males. For every 100 females age 18 and over, there were 91.7 males.

The median income for a household in the township was $58,125, and the median income for a family was $70,706. Males had a median income of $47,813 versus $25,911 for females. The per capita income for the township was $25,221. About 10.3% of families and 13.6% of the population were below the poverty line, including 22.6% of those under age 18 and 3.7% of those age 65 or over.

Historical population
| Census | Pop. | Note | %± |
|---|---|---|---|
| 2000 | 1,888 | | — |
| 2010 | 1,926 | | 2.0% |
| 2020 | 1,906 | | −1.0% |
U.S. Decennial Census
