= Logan County, Illinois =

County in Illinois, United States

- County
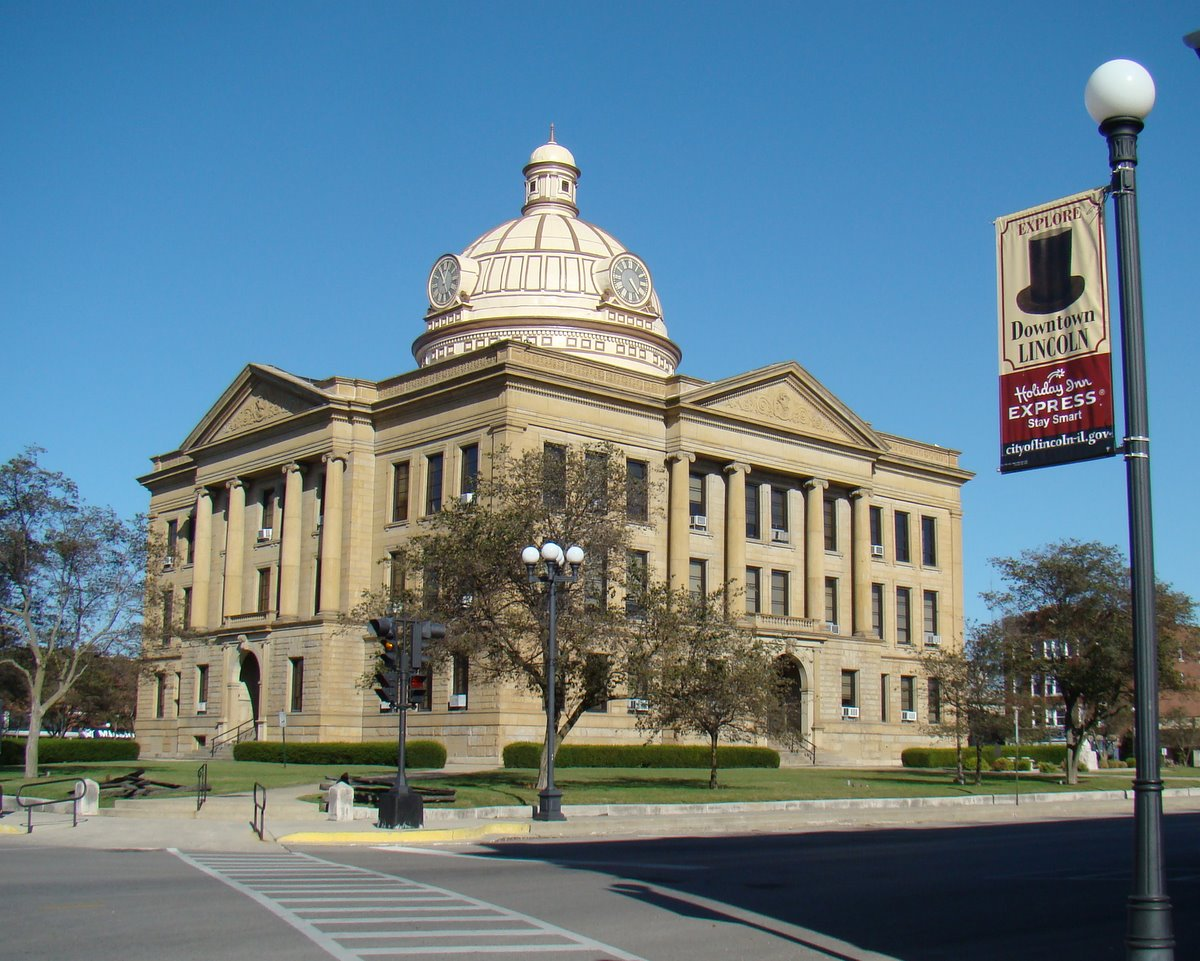
- Logan County Courthouse

- Location within the U.S. state of Illinois
- Coordinates: 40°08′N 89°22′W
- Country: United States
- State: Illinois
- Founded: February 15, 1839
- Named for: John A. Logan
- Seat: Lincoln
- Largest city: Lincoln

Area
  - Total: 619 sq mi (1,600 km^{2})
  - Land: 618 sq mi (1,600 km^{2})
  - Water: 0.9 sq mi (2.3 km^{2}) 0.1%

Population (2020)
  - Total: 27,987
  - Estimate (2025): 27,182 ▼
  - Density: 45.3/sq mi (17.5/km^{2})
- Time zone: UTC−6 (Central)
  - Summer (DST): UTC−5 (CDT)
- Congressional district: 15th
- Website: logancountyil.gov/index.php?lang=en

Logan County is a county located in the U.S. state of Illinois. According to the 2020 census, it had a population of 27,987. Its county seat is Lincoln.

Logan County comprises the Lincoln, IL Micropolitan Statistical Area, which is included in the Springfield-Jacksonville-Lincoln, IL Combined Statistical Area.

== History ==
Established in 1839, Logan County was named after physician and State Representative John Logan, father of Union General John Alexander Logan.

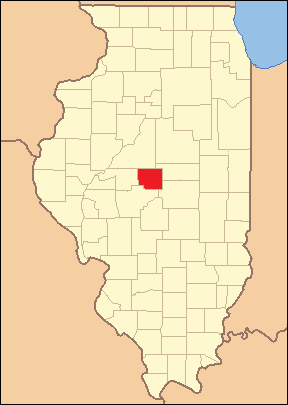
Logan County from the time of its creation to 1841

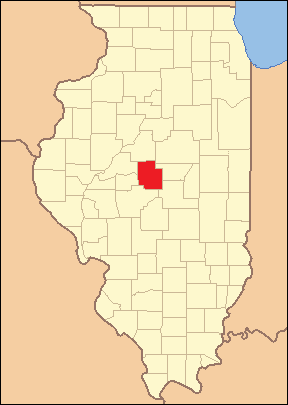
Logan County between 1841 and 1845

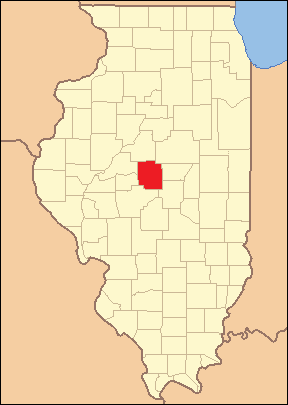
In 1845, a portion of Dewitt County was ceded to Logan, bringing it to its current size

== Geography ==
According to the U.S. Census Bureau, the county has a total area of 619 square miles (1,600 km^{2}), of which 618 square miles (1,600 km^{2}) is land and 0.9 square miles (2.3 km^{2}) (0.1%) is water.

=== Climate and weather ===
Lincoln, Illinois

Climate chart (precipitation, max. and min. temperature)
| J | F | M | A | M | J | J | A | S | O | N | D |
| 1.7 32 15 | 1.6 38 19 | 3.1 50 29 | 3.6 63 39 | 4.4 74 50 | 4 83 61 | 4.4 86 64 | 4 84 62 | 3.1 78 53 | 2.8 66 41 | 3 51 31 | 2.6 38 21 |
- █ Average max. and min. temperatures in °F
- █ Precipitation totals in inches
- Source: The Weather Channel
Metric conversion
| J | F | M | A | M | J | J | A | S | O | N | D |
| 43 0 −9 | 39 3 −7 | 79 10 −2 | 92 17 4 | 112 23 10 | 101 28 16 | 110 30 18 | 102 29 17 | 80 26 12 | 71 19 5 | 76 11 −1 | 67 3 −6 |
- █ Average max. and min. temperatures in °C
- █ Precipitation totals in mm

In recent years, average temperatures in the county seat of Lincoln have ranged from a low of 15 °F (−9.4 °C) in January to a high of 86 °F (30 °C) in July, although a record low of −29 °F (−33.9 °C) was recorded in December 1914 and a record high of 113 °F (45 °C) was recorded in July 1936. Average monthly precipitation ranged from 1.55 inches (39.4 mm) in February to 4.42 inches (112.3 mm) in May.

=== Transit ===
- SHOW Bus
- Lincoln station

=== Major highways ===
- I-55
  - I-55 BL (Lincoln)
- I-155
- US 136
- IL 10
- IL 54 (former US 54)
- IL 121

=== Adjacent counties ===
- Mason County - northwest
- Tazewell County - north
- McLean County - northeast
- De Witt County - east
- Macon County - southeast
- Sangamon County - south
- Menard County - west

== Demographics ==
Historical population
| Census | Pop. | Note | %± |
|---|---|---|---|
| 1840 | 2,333 | | — |
| 1850 | 5,128 | | 119.8% |
| 1860 | 14,272 | | 178.3% |
| 1870 | 23,053 | | 61.5% |
| 1880 | 25,037 | | 8.6% |
| 1890 | 25,489 | | 1.8% |
| 1900 | 28,680 | | 12.5% |
| 1910 | 30,216 | | 5.4% |
| 1920 | 29,562 | | −2.2% |
| 1930 | 28,863 | | −2.4% |
| 1940 | 29,438 | | 2.0% |
| 1950 | 30,671 | | 4.2% |
| 1960 | 33,656 | | 9.7% |
| 1970 | 33,538 | | −0.4% |
| 1980 | 31,802 | | −5.2% |
| 1990 | 30,798 | | −3.2% |
| 2000 | 31,183 | | 1.3% |
| 2010 | 30,305 | | −2.8% |
| 2020 | 27,987 | | −7.6% |
| 2025 (est.) | 27,182 | ▼ | −2.9% |
U.S. Decennial Census; 1790-1960 1900-1990; 1990-2000 2010-2013

=== 2020 census ===
Logan County, Illinois – Racial and ethnic composition Note: the US Census treats Hispanic/Latino as an ethnic category. This table excludes Latinos from the racial categories and assigns them to a separate category. Hispanics/Latinos may be of any race.
| Race / Ethnicity (NH = Non-Hispanic) | Pop 1980 | Pop 1990 | Pop 2000 | Pop 2010 | Pop 2020 | % 1980 | % 1990 | % 2000 | % 2010 | % 2020 |
|---|---|---|---|---|---|---|---|---|---|---|
| White alone (NH) | 30,655 | 28,984 | 28,247 | 26,586 | 24,452 | 96.39% | 94.11% | 90.58% | 87.73% | 87.37% |
| Black or African American alone (NH) | 813 | 1,281 | 2,037 | 2,243 | 1,494 | 2.56% | 4.16% | 6.53% | 7.40% | 5.34% |
| Native American or Alaska Native alone (NH) | 26 | 36 | 48 | 54 | 48 | 0.08% | 0.12% | 0.15% | 0.18% | 0.17% |
| Asian alone (NH) | 109 | 136 | 165 | 184 | 178 | 0.34% | 0.44% | 0.53% | 0.61% | 0.64% |
| Native Hawaiian or Pacific Islander alone (NH) | x | x | 4 | 5 | 1 | x | x | 0.01% | 0.02% | 0.00% |
| Other race alone (NH) | 15 | 13 | 3 | 12 | 76 | 0.05% | 0.04% | 0.01% | 0.04% | 0.27% |
| Mixed race or Multiracial (NH) | x | x | 176 | 328 | 920 | x | x | 0.56% | 1.08% | 3.29% |
| Hispanic or Latino (any race) | 184 | 348 | 503 | 893 | 818 | 0.58% | 1.13% | 1.61% | 2.95% | 2.92% |
| Total | 31,802 | 30,798 | 31,183 | 30,305 | 27,987 | 100.00% | 100.00% | 100.00% | 100.00% | 100.00% |

As of the 2020 census, the county had a population of 27,987. The median age was 41.9 years. 19.5% of residents were under the age of 18 and 19.9% of residents were 65 years of age or older. For every 100 females there were 91.9 males, and for every 100 females age 18 and over there were 89.0 males age 18 and over.

The racial makeup of the county was 88.1% White, 5.4% Black or African American, 0.2% American Indian and Alaska Native, 0.6% Asian, <0.1% Native Hawaiian and Pacific Islander, 1.6% from some other race, and 4.0% from two or more races. Hispanic or Latino residents of any race comprised 2.9% of the population.

50.0% of residents lived in urban areas, while 50.0% lived in rural areas.

There were 10,749 households in the county, of which 26.4% had children under the age of 18 living in them. Of all households, 46.3% were married-couple households, 19.2% were households with a male householder and no spouse or partner present, and 27.1% were households with a female householder and no spouse or partner present. About 31.7% of all households were made up of individuals and 15.5% had someone living alone who was 65 years of age or older.

There were 11,984 housing units, of which 10.3% were vacant. Among occupied housing units, 71.5% were owner-occupied and 28.5% were renter-occupied. The homeowner vacancy rate was 2.9% and the rental vacancy rate was 8.2%.

=== 2010 census ===
According to the 2010 United States census, there were 30,305 people, 11,070 households, and 7,274 families residing in the county. The population density was 49.0 inhabitants per square mile (18.9/km^{2}). There were 12,107 housing units at an average density of 19.6 per square mile (7.6/km^{2}). The racial makeup of the county was 89.1% white, 7.5% black or African American, 0.6% Asian, 0.2% American Indian, 1.2% from other races, and 1.3% from two or more races. Those of Hispanic or Latino origin made up 2.9% of the population. In terms of ancestry, 30.9% were German, 17.4% were American, 13.1% were Irish, and 10.8% were English.

Of the 11,070 households, 29.7% had children under the age of 18 living with them, 50.3% were married couples living together, 10.6% had a female householder with no husband present, 34.3% were non-families, and 29.2% of all households were made up of individuals. The average household size was 2.34 and the average family size was 2.85. The median age was 39.4 years. 14.4% of the population were living in group quarters including 11.4% of the population institutionalized.

The median income for a household in the county was $48,999 and the median income for a family was $63,245. Males had a median income of $43,940 versus $31,783 for females. The per capita income for the county was $22,063. About 6.8% of families and 9.8% of the population were below the poverty line, including 15.1% of those under age 18 and 5.2% of those age 65 or over.

== Communities ==
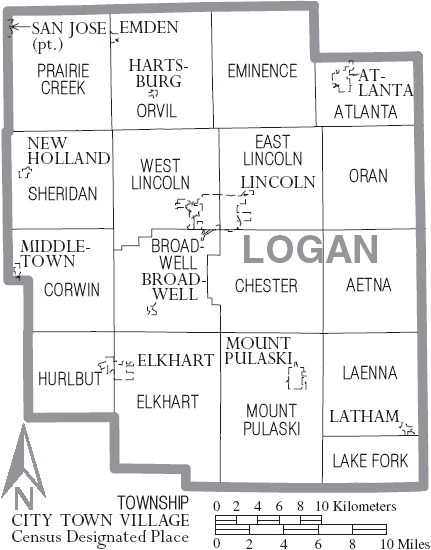
Map of Logan County, Illinois

=== Cities ===
- Atlanta
- Lincoln (seat)
- Mount Pulaski

=== Villages ===
- Broadwell
- Elkhart
- Emden
- Hartsburg
- Latham
- Middletown
- New Holland
- San Jose

=== Census-designated places ===
- Beason
- Chestnut
- Cornland

=== Unincorporated communities ===
- Bakerville
- Burton View
- Chestervale
- Evans
- Harness
- Lake Fork
- Lawndale
- Mount Fulcher
- Mountjoy
- Skelton
- Union

=== Extinct community ===
- Postville

=== Townships ===
- Aetna
- Atlanta
- Broadwell
- Chester
- Corwin
- East Lincoln
- Elkhart
- Eminence
- Hurlbut
- Laenna
- Lake Fork
- Mt. Pulaski
- Oran
- Orvil
- Prairie Creek
- Sheridan
- West Lincoln

== Government and infrastructure ==
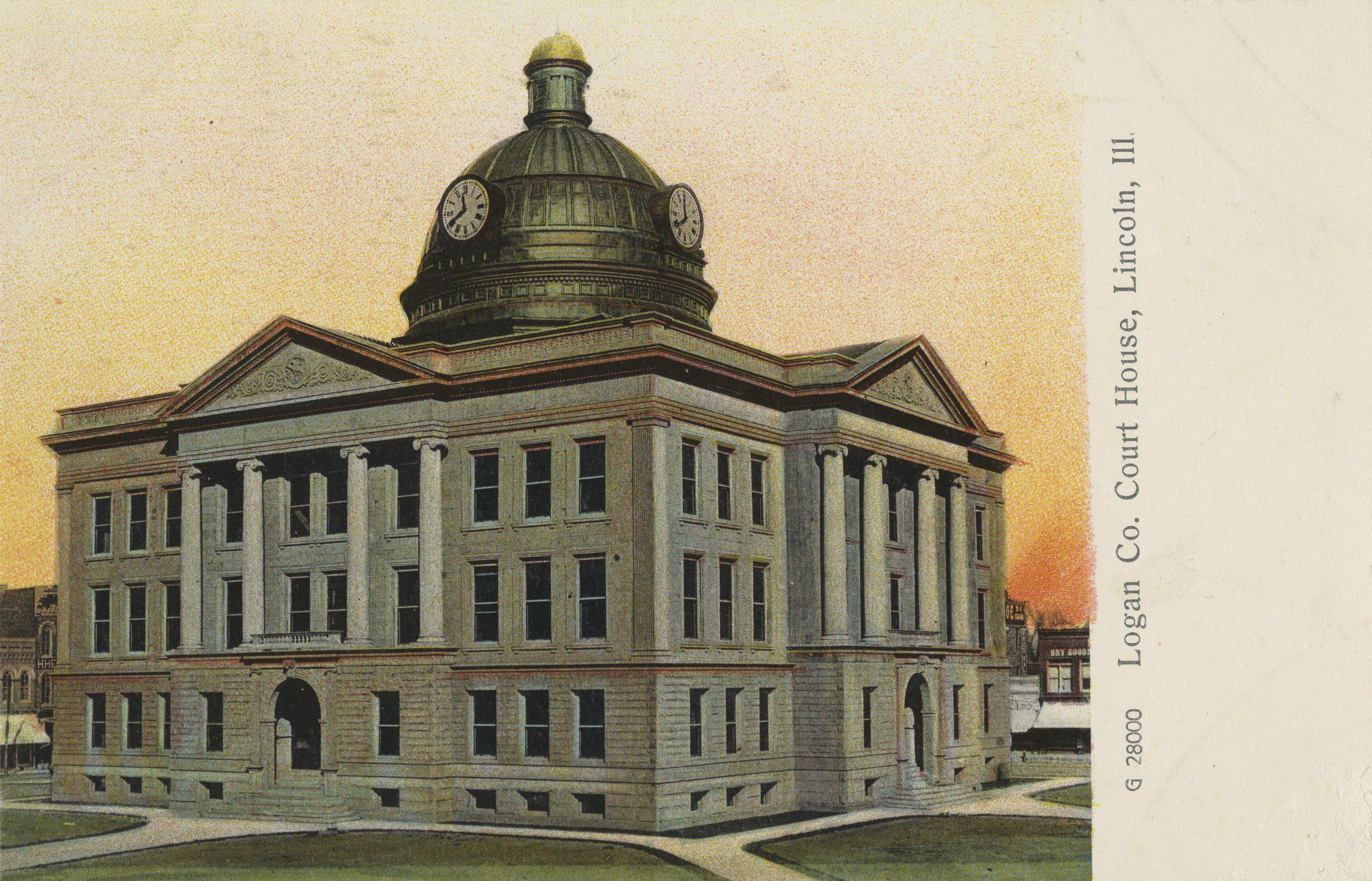
Logan County courthouse in Lincoln, Illinois, circa 1901-1907

The Illinois Department of Corrections Logan Correctional Center is located in unincorporated Logan County, near Lincoln.

=== Politics ===
In the period following the Civil War, Logan was a swing county, following the popular vote winner in every election up to 1936 except those of 1900 and 1916. Since 1940, when its isolationist sentiment drove voters to Wendell Willkie, Logan has become a strongly Republican county. No Democratic presidential candidate has won Logan County since Lyndon Johnson’s 1964 landslide over Barry Goldwater. In fact, apart from Johnson, Barack Obama in 2008 is the solitary Democrat to reach forty percent in the past nineteen elections.

United States presidential election results for Logan County, Illinois
| Year | Republican | | Democratic | | Third party(ies) | |
| Year | No. | % | No. | % | No. | % |
|---|---|---|---|---|---|---|
| 1892 | 2,619 | 42.54% | 3,150 | 51.17% | 387 | 6.29% |
| 1896 | 3,430 | 49.30% | 3,389 | 48.71% | 138 | 1.98% |
| 1900 | 3,501 | 47.73% | 3,672 | 50.06% | 162 | 2.21% |
| 1904 | 3,626 | 51.24% | 3,005 | 42.47% | 445 | 6.29% |
| 1908 | 3,451 | 47.44% | 3,546 | 48.74% | 278 | 3.82% |
| 1912 | 1,397 | 20.85% | 3,229 | 48.19% | 2,075 | 30.97% |
| 1916 | 5,933 | 48.26% | 5,726 | 46.58% | 635 | 5.17% |
| 1920 | 6,957 | 64.79% | 3,232 | 30.10% | 549 | 5.11% |
| 1924 | 7,063 | 57.16% | 3,708 | 30.01% | 1,585 | 12.83% |
| 1928 | 7,631 | 59.97% | 5,019 | 39.44% | 75 | 0.59% |
| 1932 | 5,850 | 41.44% | 8,119 | 57.52% | 147 | 1.04% |
| 1936 | 7,019 | 46.52% | 7,886 | 52.27% | 182 | 1.21% |
| 1940 | 8,929 | 56.78% | 6,753 | 42.94% | 43 | 0.27% |
| 1944 | 7,955 | 61.90% | 4,868 | 37.88% | 29 | 0.23% |
| 1948 | 7,431 | 60.36% | 4,832 | 39.25% | 49 | 0.40% |
| 1952 | 9,162 | 64.39% | 5,048 | 35.48% | 19 | 0.13% |
| 1956 | 9,589 | 66.61% | 4,793 | 33.29% | 14 | 0.10% |
| 1960 | 9,383 | 62.18% | 5,691 | 37.71% | 16 | 0.11% |
| 1964 | 6,805 | 46.88% | 7,712 | 53.12% | 0 | 0.00% |
| 1968 | 8,638 | 60.45% | 4,552 | 31.86% | 1,099 | 7.69% |
| 1972 | 10,277 | 69.95% | 4,395 | 29.91% | 20 | 0.14% |
| 1976 | 8,623 | 59.94% | 5,686 | 39.52% | 77 | 0.54% |
| 1980 | 9,681 | 67.39% | 3,916 | 27.26% | 769 | 5.35% |
| 1984 | 9,932 | 70.71% | 4,052 | 28.85% | 62 | 0.44% |
| 1988 | 8,490 | 63.90% | 4,727 | 35.58% | 69 | 0.52% |
| 1992 | 6,567 | 46.26% | 5,169 | 36.41% | 2,459 | 17.32% |
| 1996 | 6,518 | 52.80% | 4,618 | 37.41% | 1,209 | 9.79% |
| 2000 | 8,141 | 62.31% | 4,600 | 35.21% | 324 | 2.48% |
| 2004 | 9,112 | 67.66% | 4,273 | 31.73% | 82 | 0.61% |
| 2008 | 7,429 | 57.41% | 5,250 | 40.57% | 262 | 2.02% |
| 2012 | 7,844 | 64.89% | 3,978 | 32.91% | 266 | 2.20% |
| 2016 | 8,181 | 65.97% | 3,313 | 26.72% | 907 | 7.31% |
| 2020 | 9,136 | 68.55% | 3,840 | 28.81% | 351 | 2.63% |
| 2024 | 8,757 | 69.38% | 3,543 | 28.07% | 321 | 2.54% |

== Education ==
K-12 school districts include:

- Athens Community Unit School District 213
- Clinton Community Unit School District 15
- Delavan Community Unit School District 703
- Greenview Community Unit School District 200
- Hartsburg-Emden Community Unit School District 21
- Illini Central Community Unit School District 189
- Mount Pulaski Community Unit District 23
- Olympia Community Unit School District 16
- Warrensburg-Latham Community Unit District 11
- Williamsville Community Unit School District 15

Secondary school districts include:

- Lincoln Community High School District 404

Elementary school districts include:

- Chester-East Lincoln Community Consolidated School District 61
- Lincoln Elementary School District 27
- New Holland-Middletown Elementary School District 88
- West Lincoln-Broadwell Elementary School District 92

== Notable people ==
- Brian Cook, NBA player
- Norm Cook, NBA player
- Robert A. Emmitt, Oregon farmer and legislator
- Terry Kinney, actor
- Edward Madigan, Former United States Secretary of Agriculture
- William Keepers Maxwell Jr., editor, novelist, short story writer

== See also ==
- National Register of Historic Places listings in Logan County, Illinois
