= Mount Pulaski Township, Logan County, Illinois =

Coordinates: 39°58′59″N 89°18′44″W

Mount Pulaski Township
- Township
- Location in Logan County

- Logan County's location in Illinois
- Country: United States
- State: Illinois
- County: Logan
- Established: November 7, 1865

Area
  - Total: 54.06 sq mi (140.0 km^{2})
  - Land: 54.06 sq mi (140.0 km^{2})
  - Water: 0 sq mi (0 km^{2}) 0%

Population (2020)
  - Total: 2,011
  - Density: 37.20/sq mi (14.36/km^{2})
- Time zone: UTC-6 (CST)
  - Summer (DST): UTC-5 (CDT)
- FIPS code: 17-107-51141

Mount Pulaski Township is located in Logan County, Illinois. As of the 2020 census, its population was 2,011 and it contained 954 housing units.

== Geography ==
According to the 2021 census gazetteer files, Mount Pulaski Township has a total area of 54.06 square miles (140.01 km^{2}), all land.

== Demographics ==
As of the 2020 census there were 2,011 people, 842 households, and 556 families residing in the township. The population density was 37.20 inhabitants per square mile (14.36/km^{2}). There were 954 housing units at an average density of 17.65 per square mile (6.81/km^{2}). The racial makeup of the township was 97.41% White, 0.20% African American, 0.10% Native American, 0.15% Asian, 0.00% Pacific Islander, 0.10% from other races, and 2.04% from two or more races. Hispanic or Latino of any race were 0.99% of the population.

There were 842 households, out of which 32.10% had children under the age of 18 living with them, 51.54% were married couples living together, 10.81% had a female householder with no spouse present, and 33.97% were non-families. 29.00% of all households were made up of individuals, and 15.10% had someone living alone who was 65 years of age or older. The average household size was 2.46 and the average family size was 3.06.

According to the 2020 American Community Survey, township's age distribution consisted of 29.8% under the age of 18, 4.6% from 18 to 24, 23.1% from 25 to 44, 24% from 45 to 64, and 18.6% who were 65 years of age or older. The median age was 41.3 years. For every 100 females, there were 93.9 males. For every 100 females age 18 and over, there were 88.6 males.

The median income for a household in the township was $61,480, and the median income for a family was $76,574. Males had a median income of $51,447 versus $42,583 for females. The per capita income for the township was $31,568. About 0.9% of families and 3.1% of the population were below the poverty line, including 0.3% of those under age 18 and 8.3% of those age 65 or over.

Historical population
Census	Pop.	Note	%±
2000	2,242		—
2010	2,100		−6.3%
2020	2,011		−4.2%
U.S. Decennial Census
