= Hartsburg, Illinois =

Hartsburg
- Village
- Location of Hartsburg in Logan County, Illinois.
- Coordinates: 40°15′02″N 89°26′28″W
- Country: United States
- State: Illinois
- County: Logan

Area
  - Total: 0.15 sq mi (0.39 km^{2})
  - Land: 0.15 sq mi (0.39 km^{2})
  - Water: 0 sq mi (0.00 km^{2})
- Elevation: 604 ft (184 m)

Population (2020)
  - Total: 262
  - Density: 1,746.6/sq mi (674.36/km^{2})
- Time zone: UTC-6 (CST)
  - Summer (DST): UTC-5 (CDT)
- ZIP code: 62643
- Area code: 217
- FIPS code: 17-33318
- GNIS feature ID: 2398259
- Wikimedia Commons: Hartsburg, Illinois
- Website: www.discoverhartsburg.com

Hartsburg is a village in Logan County, Illinois, United States. As of the 2020 census, Hartsburg had a population of 262.

== Geography ==
According to the 2021 census gazetteer files, Hartsburg has a total area of 0.15 square miles (0.39 km^{2}), all land.

== Demographics ==
Historical population
Census	Pop.	Note	%±
1880	188		—
1890	269		43.1%
1900	269		0.0%
1910	350		30.1%
1920	332		−5.1%
1930	318		−4.2%
1940	269		−15.4%
1950	245		−8.9%
1960	300		22.4%
1970	363		21.0%
1980	379		4.4%
1990	306		−19.3%
2000	358		17.0%
2010	314		−12.3%
2020	262		−16.6%
Decennial US Census

As of the 2020 census there were 262 people, 178 households, and 94 families residing in the village. The population density was 1,746.67 inhabitants per square mile (674.39/km^{2}). There were 131 housing units at an average density of 873.33 per square mile (337.19/km^{2}). The racial makeup of the village was 93.89% White, 0.76% African American, 0.76% Native American, 0.38% Asian, 0.00% Pacific Islander, 0.38% from other races, and 3.82% from two or more races. Hispanic or Latino of any race were 0.76% of the population.

There were 178 households, out of which 26.4% had children under the age of 18 living with them, 26.97% were married couples living together, 10.11% had a female householder with no husband present, and 47.19% were non-families. 28.09% of all households were made up of individuals, and 10.67% had someone living alone who was 65 years of age or older. The average household size was 2.91 and the average family size was 2.17.

The village's age distribution consisted of 13.7% under the age of 18, 22.8% from 18 to 24, 23.6% from 25 to 44, 28% from 45 to 64, and 11.9% who were 65 years of age or older. The median age was 29.7 years. For every 100 females, there were 162.6 males. For every 100 females age 18 and over, there were 143.1 males.

The median income for a household in the village was $50,625, and the median income for a family was $47,414. Males had a median income of $22,135 versus $35,417 for females. The per capita income for the village was $26,162. About 1.1% of families and 2.1% of the population were below the poverty line, including 0.0% of those under age 18 and 6.5% of those age 65 or over.
