= Corwin Township, Logan County, Illinois =

Coordinates: 40°05′58″N 89°32′13″W

Corwin Township
- Township
- Location in Logan County

- Logan County's location in Illinois
- Country: United States
- State: Illinois
- County: Logan
- Established: November 7, 1865

Area
  - Total: 33.59 sq mi (87.0 km^{2})
  - Land: 33.56 sq mi (86.9 km^{2})
  - Water: 0.03 sq mi (0.078 km^{2}) 0.09%

Population (2020)
  - Total: 608
  - Density: 18.1/sq mi (6.99/km^{2})
- Time zone: UTC-6 (CST)
  - Summer (DST): UTC-5 (CDT)
- FIPS code: 17-107-16496

Corwin Township is located in Logan County, Illinois. As of the 2020 census, its population was 608 and it contained 285 housing units. Corwin Township changed its name from Middletown Township on an unknown date.

== Geography ==
According to the 2021 census gazetteer files, Corwin Township has a total area of 33.59 square miles (87.00 km^{2}), of which 33.56 square miles (86.92 km^{2}) (or 99.91%) is land and 0.03 square miles (0.08 km^{2}) (or 0.09%) is water.

== Demographics ==
As of the 2020 census there were 608 people, 184 households, and 150 families residing in the township. The population density was 18.10 inhabitants per square mile (6.99/km^{2}). There were 285 housing units at an average density of 8.48 per square mile (3.27/km^{2}). The racial makeup of the township was 95.07% White, 0.33% African American, 0.00% Native American, 0.00% Asian, 0.00% Pacific Islander, 0.16% from other races, and 4.44% from two or more races. Hispanic or Latino of any race were 1.81% of the population.

There were 184 households, out of which 30.40% had children under the age of 18 living with them, 65.76% were married couples living together, 8.70% had a female householder with no spouse present, and 18.48% were non-families. 16.30% of all households were made up of individuals, and 10.90% had someone living alone who was 65 years of age or older. The average household size was 2.51 and the average family size was 2.71.

According to the 2020 American Community Survey, township's age distribution consisted of 20.2% under the age of 18, 4.6% from 18 to 24, 21.5% from 25 to 44, 36.2% from 45 to 64, and 17.6% who were 65 years of age or older. The median age was 49.8 years. For every 100 females, there were 103.3 males. For every 100 females age 18 and over, there were 106.1 males.

The median income for a household in the township was $70,000, and the median income for a family was $72,292. Males had a median income of $39,167 versus $38,125 for females. The per capita income for the township was $32,047. About 2.7% of families and 5.9% of the population were below the poverty line, including 5.4% of those under age 18 and 7.4% of those age 65 or over.

Historical population
Census	Pop.	Note	%±
2000	723		—
2010	643		−11.1%
2020	608		−5.4%
U.S. Decennial Census
