= Lake Fork Township, Logan County, Illinois =

Coordinates: 39°56′14″N 89°11′28″W

Lake Fork Township
- Township
- Location in Logan County

- Logan County's location in Illinois
- Country: United States
- State: Illinois
- County: Logan
- Established: November 7, 1865

Area
  - Total: 17.80 sq mi (46.1 km^{2})
  - Land: 17.80 sq mi (46.1 km^{2})
  - Water: 0 sq mi (0 km^{2}) 0%

Population (2020)
  - Total: 126
  - Density: 7.08/sq mi (2.73/km^{2})
- Time zone: UTC-6 (CST)
  - Summer (DST): UTC-5 (CDT)
- FIPS code: 17-107-41144

Lake Fork Township is located in Logan County, Illinois. As of the 2020 Census, it had a population of 126 people and it contains 56 housing units.

== Geography ==
According to the 2021 census gazetteer files, Lake Fork Township has a total area of 17.80 square miles (46.10 km^{2}), all land.

== Demographics ==
As of the 2020 census there were 126 people, 71 households, and 54 families residing in the township. The population density was 7.08 inhabitants per square mile (2.73/km^{2}). There were 53 housing units at an average density of 2.98 per square mile (1.15/km^{2}). The racial makeup of the township was 96.03% White, 0.00% African American, 0.00% Native American, 0.00% Asian, 0.00% Pacific Islander, 0.00% from other races, and 3.97% from two or more races. Hispanic or Latino of any race were 0.00% of the population.

There were 71 households, out of which 0.00% had children under the age of 18 living with them, 76.06% were married couples living together, 0.00% had a female householder with no spouse present, and 23.94% were non-families. 23.90% of all households were made up of individuals, and 12.70% had someone living alone who was 65 years of age or older. The average household size was 1.77 and the average family size was 2.02.

According to the 2020 American Community Survey, township's age distribution consisted of 0.0% under the age of 18, 4.8% from 18 to 24, 37.3% from 25 to 44, 43.6% from 45 to 64, and 14.3% who were 65 years of age or older. The median age was 51.9 years. For every 100 females, there were 110 males. For every 100 females age 18 and over, there were 104.2 males.

The median income for a household in the township was $126,750, and the median income for a family was $126,800. The per capita income for the township was $74,388. About 0.0% of families and 7.1% of the population were below the poverty line, including 50.0% of those age 65 or over.

Historical population
Census	Pop.	Note	%±
2000	142		—
2010	154		8.5%
2020	126		−18.2%
U.S. Decennial Census
