= Laenna Township, Logan County, Illinois =

Coordinates: 40°01′N 89°12′W

Laenna Township
- Township
- Location in Logan County

- Logan County's location in Illinois
- Country: United States
- State: Illinois
- County: Logan
- Established: November 7, 1865

Area
  - Total: 35.07 sq mi (90.8 km^{2})
  - Land: 35.05 sq mi (90.8 km^{2})
  - Water: 0.02 sq mi (0.052 km^{2}) 0.06%

Population (2020)
  - Total: 526
  - Density: 15.0/sq mi (5.79/km^{2})
- Time zone: UTC-6 (CST)
  - Summer (DST): UTC-5 (CDT)
- FIPS code: 17-107-40624

Laenna Township is located in Logan County, Illinois. As of the 2020 census, its population was 526 and it contained 280 housing units.

== Geography ==
According to the 2021 census gazetteer files, Laenna Township has a total area of 35.07 square miles (90.83 km^{2}), of which 35.05 square miles (90.78 km^{2}) (or 99.94%) is land and 0.02 square miles (0.05 km^{2}) (or 0.06%) is water.

The township includes the geographical center of the State of Illinois, a small monument to which has been erected at 40°3.157'N 89°11.087'W (40.05259,-89.18482), in a park southeast of Melvin Street and East Olive Street in the village of Chestnut.

== Demographics ==
As of the 2020 census there were 526 people, 218 households, and 99 families residing in the township. The population density was 15.00 inhabitants per square mile (5.79/km^{2}). There were 280 housing units at an average density of 7.98 per square mile (3.08/km^{2}). The racial makeup of the township was 96.01% White, 0.00% African American, 0.00% Native American, 0.19% Asian, 0.00% Pacific Islander, 0.19% from other races, and 3.61% from two or more races. Hispanic or Latino of any race were 0.57% of the population.

There were 218 households, out of which 14.20% had children under the age of 18 living with them, 38.53% were married couples living together, 4.13% had a female householder with no spouse present, and 54.59% were non-families. 23.90% of all households were made up of individuals, and 13.30% had someone living alone who was 65 years of age or older. The average household size was 2.21 and the average family size was 2.83.

According to the 2020 American Community Survey, township's age distribution consisted of 14.3% under the age of 18, 14.6% from 18 to 24, 10.8% from 25 to 44, 34.3% from 45 to 64, and 26.0% who were 65 years of age or older. The median age was 47.9 years. For every 100 females, there were 100.8 males. For every 100 females age 18 and over, there were 104.9 males.

The median income for a household in the township was $54,934, and the median income for a family was $63,438. Males had a median income of $41,154 versus $25,854 for females. The per capita income for the township was $28,768. About 6.1% of families and 10.0% of the population were below the poverty line, including 20.3% of those under age 18 and 6.4% of those age 65 or over.

Historical population
Census	Pop.	Note	%±
2000	617		—
2010	584		−5.3%
2020	526		−9.9%
U.S. Decennial Census
