= Sheridan Township, Logan County, Illinois =

Coordinates: 40°10′41″N 89°32′27″W

Sheridan Township
- Township
- Location in Logan County

- Logan County's location in Illinois
- Country: United States
- State: Illinois
- County: Logan
- Established: November 7, 1865

Government
  - Supervisor: Grant LaForge

Area
  - Total: 35.51 sq mi (92.0 km^{2})
  - Land: 35.51 sq mi (92.0 km^{2})
  - Water: 0 sq mi (0 km^{2}) 0%

Population (2020)
  - Total: 466
  - Density: 13.1/sq mi (5.07/km^{2})
- Time zone: UTC-6 (CST)
  - Summer (DST): UTC-5 (CDT)
- FIPS code: 17-107-69290

Sheridan Township is located in Logan County, Illinois. As of the 2020 census, its population was 466 and it contained 208 housing units.

== Geography ==
According to the 2021 census gazetteer files, Sheridan Township has a total area of 35.51 square miles (91.97 km^{2}), all land.

== Demographics ==
Historical population
Census	Pop.	Note	%±
2000	555		—
2010	477		−14.1%
2020	466		−2.3%
U.S. Decennial Census

As of the 2020 census there were 466 people, 179 households, and 112 families residing in the township. The population density was 13.12 inhabitants per square mile (5.07/km^{2}). There were 208 housing units at an average density of 5.86 per square mile (2.26/km^{2}). The racial makeup of the township was 94.42% White, 0.21% African American, 0.21% Native American, 0.43% Asian, 0.00% Pacific Islander, 0.43% from other races, and 4.29% from two or more races. Hispanic or Latino of any race were 1.07% of the population.

There were 179 households, out of which 21.20% had children under the age of 18 living with them, 49.72% were married couples living together, 12.29% had a female householder with no spouse present, and 37.43% were non-families. 29.60% of all households were made up of individuals, and 8.90% had someone living alone who was 65 years of age or older. The average household size was 2.47 and the average family size was 3.17.

According to the 2020 American Community Survey, township's age distribution consisted of 21.4% under the age of 18, 4.3% from 18 to 24, 23% from 25 to 44, 37.9% from 45 to 64, and 13.3% who were 65 years of age or older. The median age was 47.3 years. For every 100 females, there were 103.5 males. For every 100 females age 18 and over, there were 106.9 males.

The median income for a household in the township was $78,250, and the median income for a family was $91,875. Males had a median income of $54,519 versus $32,321 for females. The per capita income for the township was $44,150. About 3.6% of families and 3.8% of the population were below the poverty line, including 7.4% of those under age 18 and 0.0% of those age 65 or over.
