= Mount Pulaski, Illinois =

Mount Pulaski
- City
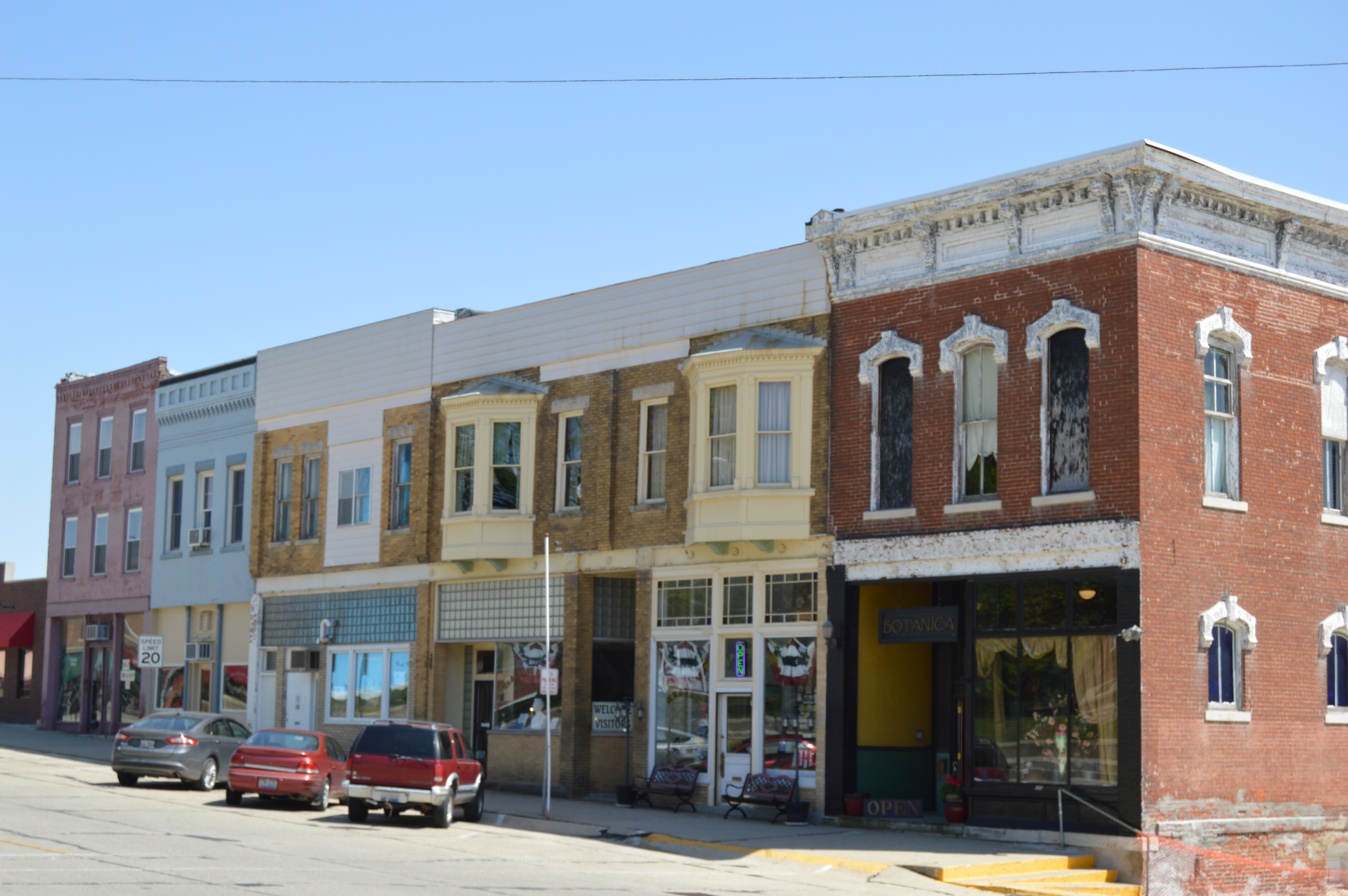
- Businesses on Cooke Street downtown
- Nickname: Vinegar Hill
- Location of Mount Pulaski in Logan County, Illinois.
- Coordinates: 40°00′36″N 89°17′02″W
- Country: United States
- State: Illinois
- County: Logan
- Founded: 1836

Area
  - Total: 1.14 sq mi (2.94 km^{2})
  - Land: 1.14 sq mi (2.94 km^{2})
  - Water: 0 sq mi (0.00 km^{2})
- Elevation: 679 ft (207 m)

Population (2020)
  - Total: 1,537
  - Density: 1,355.4/sq mi (523.32/km^{2})
- Time zone: UTC-6 (CST)
  - Summer (DST): UTC-5 (CDT)
- ZIP code: 62548-1245
- Area code: 217
- FIPS code: 17-51128
- GNIS feature ID: 2395124
- Website: cityofmtpulaski.com

Mount Pulaski is a city in Logan County, Illinois, United States. As of the 2020 census, Mount Pulaski had a population of 1,537. It is the home of the Mount Pulaski Courthouse State Historic Site. The city is named in honor of Polish Revolutionary War hero Casimir Pulaski. Mount Pulaski has one high school: Mount Pulaski High School, home of the Hilltoppers. The school colors are purple and gold. Mount Pulaski held the county seat of Logan County from 1848 to 1855.

== Geography ==
Mount Pulaski is located near the geographic center of the state.

Mount Pulaski sits atop a glacial ridge dating to the Illinoian Stage.

According to the 2021 census gazetteer files, Mount Pulaski has a total area of 1.13 square miles (2.93 km^{2}), all land.

== Demographics ==
Historical population
Census	Pop.	Note	%±
1850	360		—
1860	511		41.9%
1870	653		27.8%
1880	1,125		72.3%
1890	1,357		20.6%
1900	1,643		21.1%
1910	1,511		−8.0%
1920	1,510		−0.1%
1930	1,445		−4.3%
1940	1,378		−4.6%
1950	1,526		10.7%
1960	1,689		10.7%
1970	1,677		−0.7%
1980	1,783		6.3%
1990	1,610		−9.7%
2000	1,701		5.7%
2010	1,566		−7.9%
2020	1,537		−1.9%
U.S. Decennial Census

As of the 2020 census there were 1,537 people, 675 households, and 446 families residing in the city. The population density was 1,355.38 inhabitants per square mile (523.32/km^{2}). There were 727 housing units at an average density of 641.09 per square mile (247.53/km^{2}). The racial makeup of the city was 97.59% White, 0.07% African American, 0.07% Native American, 0.00% Asian, 0.00% Pacific Islander, 0.07% from other races, and 2.21% from two or more races. Hispanic or Latino of any race were 0.98% of the population.

There were 675 households, out of which 31.4% had children under the age of 18 living with them, 48.00% were married couples living together, 13.48% had a female householder with no husband present, and 33.93% were non-families. 29.04% of all households were made up of individuals, and 15.11% had someone living alone who was 65 years of age or older. The average household size was 2.94 and the average family size was 2.39.

The city's age distribution consisted of 28.4% under the age of 18, 5.3% from 18 to 24, 19.8% from 25 to 44, 28.3% from 45 to 64, and 18.3% who were 65 years of age or older. The median age was 42.2 years. For every 100 females, there were 70.7 males. For every 100 females age 18 and over, there were 70.7 males.

The median income for a household in the city was $60,674, and the median income for a family was $71,667. Males had a median income of $47,614 versus $36,202 for females. The per capita income for the city was $28,400. About 1.1% of families and 3.5% of the population were below the poverty line, including 0.4% of those under age 18 and 11.4% of those age 65 or over.

There were 727 housing units, of which 10.5% were vacant. The homeowner vacancy rate was 2.3% and the rental vacancy rate was 8.1%.

Racial composition as of the 2020 census
Race	Number	Percent
White	1,500	97.6%
Black or African American	1	0.1%
American Indian and Alaska Native	1	0.1%
Asian	0	0.0%
Native Hawaiian and Other Pacific Islander	0	0.0%
Some other race	1	0.1%
Two or more races	34	2.2%
Hispanic or Latino (of any race)	15	1.0%

== Education ==
It is in the Mount Pulaski Community Unit School District 23.

== Notable people ==
- Henry Pierson Crowe, Colonel in the USMC (1899–1991); attended high school in Mount Pulaski
- Vaughn De Leath (1894–1943); First female to sing live on a radio station January 1920.
- Nicholas L. Hubbard, Illinois state legislator, grain dealer, and farmer; was born in Mount Pulaski
- William J. Rothwell, academic and author
- Herbert Ryman (1910–1989), American artist and Disney Imagineer lived in Mt. Pulaski as a youth.
- John Schlitt, lead singer for Head East and Petra
- Bob Trumpy, NFL player and broadcaster, born in Mt. Pulaski
- Dennis Werth, former Major League Baseball player is a 1971 graduate of Mt. Pulaski High School.
