= Maroa Township, Macon County, Illinois =

Coordinates: 40°1′N 88°58′W

Maroa Township
- Township
- Location in Macon County

- Macon County's location in Illinois
- Country: United States
- State: Illinois
- County: Macon
- Settlement: November 8, 1859

Area
  - Total: 41.78 sq mi (108.2 km^{2})
  - Land: 41.78 sq mi (108.2 km^{2})
  - Water: 0 sq mi (0 km^{2}) 0%

Population (2020)
  - Total: 1,867
  - Density: 44.69/sq mi (17.25/km^{2})
- Time zone: UTC-6 (CST)
  - Summer (DST): UTC-5 (CDT)
- FIPS code: 17-115-47085

Maroa Township is located in Macon County, Illinois. As of the 2020 census, its population was 1,867 and it contained 832 housing units.

The township was named after the Maroa Indians.

== Cities and towns ==
- Emery
- Maroa

== Adjacent townships ==
- Texas Township, DeWitt County (north)
- Creek Township, DeWitt County (northeast)
- Friends Creek Township (east)
- Hickory Point Township (southeast)
- Whitmore Township (southeast)
- Hickory Point Township (south)
- Illini Township (southwest)
- Austin Township (west)
- Tunbridge Township, DeWitt County (northwest)

== Geography ==
According to the 2021 census gazetteer files, Maroa Township has a total area of 41.78 square miles (108.21 km^{2}), all land.

== Demographics ==
Historical population
Census	Pop.	Note	%±
2000	1,988		—
2010	2,100		5.6%
2020	1,867		−11.1%
U.S. Decennial Census

As of the 2020 census there were 1,867 people, 782 households, and 585 families residing in the township. The population density was 44.69 inhabitants per square mile (17.25/km^{2}). There were 832 housing units at an average density of 19.92 per square mile (7.69/km^{2}). The racial makeup of the township was 93.89% White, 0.70% African American, 0.21% Native American, 0.64% Asian, 0.05% Pacific Islander, 0.32% from other races, and 4.18% from two or more races. Hispanic or Latino of any race were 1.02% of the population.

There were 782 households, out of which 37.10% had children under the age of 18 living with them, 63.17% were married couples living together, 9.08% had a female householder with no spouse present, and 25.19% were non-families. 24.00% of all households were made up of individuals, and 8.70% had someone living alone who was 65 years of age or older. The average household size was 2.89 and the average family size was 3.48.

According to the 2020 American Community Survey, township's age distribution consisted of 33.5% under the age of 18, 6.5% from 18 to 24, 23.6% from 25 to 44, 25.3% from 45 to 64, and 11.1% who were 65 years of age or older. The median age was 33.2 years. For every 100 females, there were 98.4 males. For every 100 females age 18 and over, there were 98.2 males.

The median income for a household in the township was $64,940, and the median income for a family was $85,234. Males had a median income of $56,250 versus $26,875 for females. The per capita income for the township was $29,527. About 2.7% of families and 4.0% of the population were below the poverty line, including 3.6% of those under age 18 and 0.8% of those age 65 or over.
