= Wapella Township, DeWitt County, Illinois =

Wapella Township
- Township
- Location in DeWitt County

- DeWitt County's location in Illinois
- Coordinates: 40°15′01″N 88°58′36″W
- Country: United States
- State: Illinois
- County: DeWitt
- Established: November 2, 1858

Area
  - Total: 29.07 sq mi (75.3 km^{2})
  - Land: 29.06 sq mi (75.3 km^{2})
  - Water: 0.00 sq mi (0 km^{2}) 0.01%
- Elevation: 732 ft (223 m)

Population (2020)
  - Total: 905
  - Density: 31.1/sq mi (12.0/km^{2})
- Time zone: UTC-6 (CST)
  - Summer (DST): UTC-5 (CDT)
- ZIP codes: 61727, 61745, 61777
- FIPS code: 17-039-78786
- GNIS feature ID: 429892

Wapella Township is one of thirteen townships in DeWitt County, Illinois, USA. As of the 2020 census, its population was 905 and it contained 423 housing units.

== Geography ==
According to the 2021 census gazetteer files, Wapella Township has a total area of 29.07 square miles (75.29 km^{2}), of which 29.06 square miles (75.27 km^{2}) (or 99.99%) is land and 0.00 square miles (0.00 km^{2}) (or 0.01%) is water.

=== Cities, towns, villages ===
- Wapella

=== Unincorporated towns ===
- Bucks at 40.265037°N 88.97008°W
- Carle Springs at 40.253648°N 88.967024°W

(This list is based on USGS data and may include former settlements.)

=== Cemeteries ===
The township contains four cemeteries: Crum, Long Point, Saint Particks and Sugar Grove.

== Demographics ==
As of the 2020 census there were 905 people, 512 households, and 296 families residing in the township. The population density was 31.14 inhabitants per square mile (12.02/km^{2}). There were 426 housing units at an average density of 14.66 per square mile (5.66/km^{2}). The racial makeup of the township was 96.69% White, 0.11% African American, 0.00% Native American, 0.33% Asian, 0.22% Pacific Islander, 0.22% from other races, and 2.43% from two or more races. Hispanic or Latino of any race were 1.66% of the population.

There were 512 households, out of which 21.50% had children under the age of 18 living with them, 43.16% were married couples living together, 3.52% had a female householder with no spouse present, and 42.19% were non-families. 30.10% of all households were made up of individuals, and 12.10% had someone living alone who was 65 years of age or older. The average household size was 2.35 and the average family size was 2.98.

The township's age distribution consisted of 20.2% under the age of 18, 5.2% from 18 to 24, 27.9% from 25 to 44, 30.7% from 45 to 64, and 15.9% who were 65 years of age or older. The median age was 43.1 years. For every 100 females, there were 102.9 males. For every 100 females age 18 and over, there were 110.5 males.

The median income for a household in the township was $76,009, and the median income for a family was $87,734. Males had a median income of $52,014 versus $35,795 for females. The per capita income for the township was $36,097. About 1.4% of families and 3.4% of the population were below the poverty line, including 0.0% of those under age 18 and 4.2% of those age 65 or over.

Historical population
Census	Pop.	Note	%±
1930	1,163		—
1940	1,004		−13.7%
1950	958		−4.6%
1960	882		−7.9%
1970	902		2.3%
1980	1,165		29.2%
1990	1,031		−11.5%
2000	977		−5.2%
2010	944		−3.4%
2020	905		−4.1%

== School districts ==
- Clinton Community Unit School District 15

== Political districts ==
- Illinois's 15th congressional district
- State House District 87
- State Senate District 44
