= Friends Creek Township, Macon County, Illinois =

Coordinates: 40°0′N 88°49′W

Friends Creek Township
- Township
- Location in Macon County

- Macon County's location in Illinois
- Country: United States
- State: Illinois
- County: Macon
- Settlement: November 8, 1859

Area
  - Total: 49.3 sq mi (128 km^{2})
  - Land: 49.29 sq mi (127.7 km^{2})
  - Water: 0.02 sq mi (0.052 km^{2}) 0.03%

Population (2020)
  - Total: 1,363
  - Density: 27.65/sq mi (10.68/km^{2})
- Time zone: UTC-6 (CST)
  - Summer (DST): UTC-5 (CDT)
- FIPS code: 17-115-27988

Friends Creek Township is located in Macon County, Illinois. As of the 2020 census, its population was 1,363 and it contained 589 housing units.

== Cities and towns ==
- Argenta
- Newburg

== Adjacent townships ==
- Creek Township, DeWitt County (north)
- Nixon Township, DeWitt County (north)
- Goose Creek Township, Piatt County (northeast)
- Willow Branch Township, Piatt County (east and southeast)
- Whitmore Township (south)
- Hickory Point Township (southwest)
- Maroa Township (west)
- Texas Township, DeWitt County (northwest)

== Geography ==
Friends Creek Township is the home of the Friends Creek Conservation Area, a 616-acre county conservation area that is the largest park physically located in the township. According to the 2021 census gazetteer files, Friends Creek Township has a total area of 49.30 square miles (127.69 km^{2}), of which 49.29 square miles (127.66 km^{2}) (or 99.97%) is land and 0.02 square miles (0.05 km^{2}) (or 0.03%) is water.

== Demographics ==
Historical population
Census	Pop.	Note	%±
2000	1,456		—
2010	1,450		−0.4%
2020	1,363		−6.0%
U.S. Decennial Census

As of the 2020 census there were 1,363 people, 560 households, and 389 families residing in the township. The population density was 27.65 inhabitants per square mile (10.68/km^{2}). There were 589 housing units at an average density of 11.95 per square mile (4.61/km^{2}). The racial makeup of the township was 94.13% White, 0.29% African American, 0.29% Native American, 0.22% Asian, 0.00% Pacific Islander, 0.29% from other races, and 4.77% from two or more races. Hispanic or Latino of any race were 1.39% of the population.

There were 560 households, out of which 30.40% had children under the age of 18 living with them, 58.39% were married couples living together, 6.43% had a female householder with no spouse present, and 30.54% were non-families. 23.20% of all households were made up of individuals, and 14.10% had someone living alone who was 65 years of age or older. The average household size was 2.53 and the average family size was 2.99.

According to the 2020 American Community Survey, township's age distribution consisted of 21.8% under the age of 18, 8.3% from 18 to 24, 22% from 25 to 44, 28.4% from 45 to 64, and 19.7% who were 65 years of age or older. The median age was 43.2 years. For every 100 females, there were 101.6 males. For every 100 females age 18 and over, there were 96.6 males.

The median income for a household in the township was $67,639, and the median income for a family was $76,875. Males had a median income of $43,750 versus $35,000 for females. The per capita income for the township was $30,387. About 5.9% of families and 5.6% of the population were below the poverty line, including 12.7% of those under age 18 and 1.4% of those age 65 or over.
