= DeWitt County Courthouse (Illinois) =

Local government building in the United States

Coordinates: 40°9′14″N 88°57′44″W

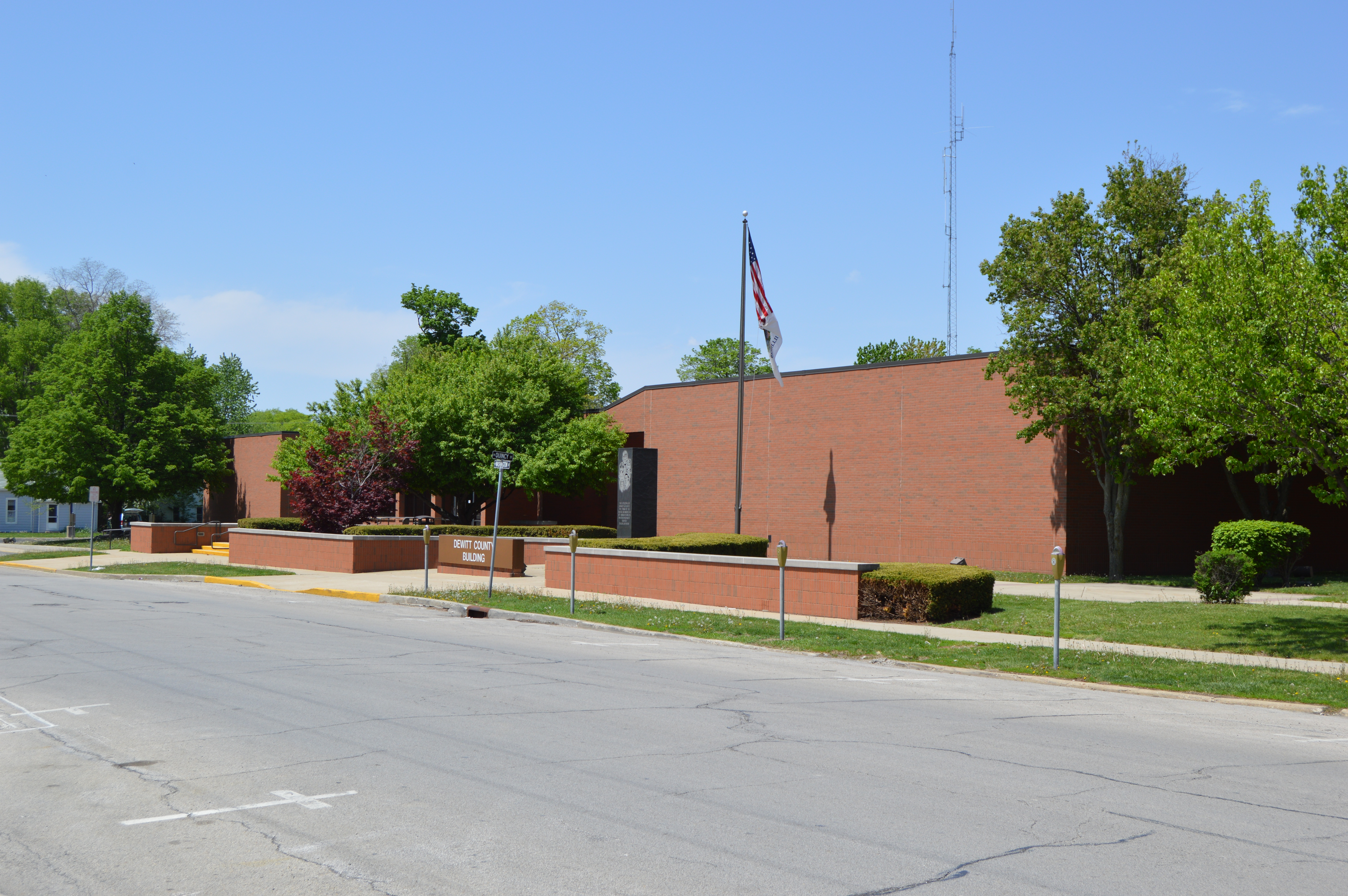
Facade

The DeWitt County Courthouse is a government building in Clinton, the county seat of DeWitt County, Illinois, United States. Completed in 1986, it is the fourth courthouse in the history of DeWitt County.

Clinton's first settler, James Miller, built a store in October 1835 at the site, and the first house and hotel were those of William Anderson in the following spring. The town was platted in October 1836. DeWitt County was created in 1839 from pieces of Macon and McLean counties, and the town of Marion was designated the temporary county seat until the voters should choose a permanent seat; Clinton won the election handily. Contractor Henry Dishon oversaw the construction of a new courthouse, which he finished on September 2, 1839 at a cost of about $600.

In 1849, this building was replaced with a larger brick structure, two stories tall and measuring 32 by 44 feet (9.8 m × 13.4 m). Entrances pierced the middle of the gabled facade of the narrow end and along a longer side, and a fence was placed around the building. This building remained in use until the turn of the twentieth century, when a replacement was constructed. The new building was a three-story stone structure in the Gothic Revival style, which aside from the upper levels of its clock tower closely resembled the Pike County Courthouse in Pittsfield.

Today, county officials operate in a modernist single-story building completed in 1986. Designed by FGM Architects, the courthouse is a long and low building with a flat roof and a partially windowless brick facade. The main entrance is placed near the building's center, and a war memorial sits in front of the eastern wing.
