= Austin Township, Macon County, Illinois =

Coordinates: 40°0′N 89°6′W

Austin Township
- Township
- Location in Macon County

- Macon County's location in Illinois
- Country: United States
- State: Illinois
- County: Macon
- Settlement: November 8, 1859

Area
  - Total: 36.86 sq mi (95.5 km^{2})
  - Land: 36.86 sq mi (95.5 km^{2})
  - Water: 0 sq mi (0 km^{2}) 0%

Population (2020)
  - Total: 240
  - Density: 6.5/sq mi (2.5/km^{2})
- Time zone: UTC-6 (CST)
  - Summer (DST): UTC-5 (CDT)
- FIPS code: 17-115-03051

Austin Township is located in Macon County, Illinois. As of the 2020 census, its population was 240 and it contained 95 housing units.

== Geography ==
According to the 2021 census gazetteer files, Austin Township has a total area of 36.86 square miles (95.47 km^{2}), all land.

== Demographics ==
As of the 2020 census there were 240 people, 126 households, and 86 families residing in the township. The population density was 6.51 inhabitants per square mile (2.51/km^{2}). There were 95 housing units at an average density of 2.58 per square mile (1.00/km^{2}). The racial makeup of the township was 94.58% White, 0.00% African American, 0.00% Native American, 0.00% Asian, 0.00% Pacific Islander, 0.00% from other races, and 5.42% from two or more races. Hispanic or Latino of any race were 0.83% of the population.

There were 126 households, out of which 7.90% had children under the age of 18 living with them, 68.25% were married couples living together, 0.00% had a female householder with no spouse present, and 31.75% were non-families. 31.70% of all households were made up of individuals, and 12.70% had someone living alone who was 65 years of age or older. The average household size was 1.99 and the average family size was 2.45.

According to the 2020 American Community Survey, township's age distribution consisted of 12.7% under the age of 18, 4.0% from 18 to 24, 8% from 25 to 44, 34.3% from 45 to 64, and 41.0% who were 65 years of age or older. The median age was 60.0 years. For every 100 females, there were 103.4 males. For every 100 females age 18 and over, there were 120 males.

The median income for a household in the township was $81,081. Males had a median income of $42,422 versus $31,786 for females. The per capita income for the township was $41,509. About 0.0% of families and 4.0% of the population were below the poverty line, including 0.0% of those under age 18 and 9.7% of those age 65 or over.

Historical population
Census	Pop.	Note	%±
2000	240		—
2010	214		−10.8%
2020	240		12.1%
U.S. Decennial Census

== Adjacent townships ==
- Tunbridge Township, DeWitt County (north)
- Texas Township, DeWitt County (northeast)
- Maroa Township (east)
- Hickory Point Township (southeast)
- Illini Township (south)
- Lake Fork Township, Logan County (southwest)
- Laenna Township, Logan County (west)
- Aetna Township, Logan County (northwest)
