= Harp Township, DeWitt County, Illinois =

Harp Township
- Township
- Location in DeWitt County

- DeWitt County's location in Illinois
- Coordinates: 40°11′07″N 88°51′30″W
- Country: United States
- State: Illinois
- County: DeWitt
- Established: November 2, 1858

Area
  - Total: 34.76 sq mi (90.0 km^{2})
  - Land: 31.19 sq mi (80.8 km^{2})
  - Water: 3.57 sq mi (9.2 km^{2}) 10.27%
- Elevation: 748 ft (228 m)

Population (2020)
  - Total: 310
  - Density: 9.9/sq mi (3.8/km^{2})
- Time zone: UTC-6 (CST)
  - Summer (DST): UTC-5 (CDT)
- ZIP codes: 61727, 61735, 61882
- FIPS code: 17-039-33058
- GNIS feature ID: 429112

Harp Township is one of thirteen townships in DeWitt County, Illinois, USA. As of the 2020 census, its population was 310 and it contained 136 housing units.

== History ==
The earliest known pioneer to settle in Harp Township was Solomon Cross who erected a log cabin deep in a forest of oak trees in 1830. The cabin was 16 feet by 18 feet and built of rough unhewn logs. The cabin stood fifty years before it was destroyed.

At about the same time as the Cross family, Jesse Mulkey and his brother-in-law Baltus Malone located in the township after a long journey from Kentucky at what would become known as Mulkey's Point. Mulkey and Malone's stay in the area would be short, abandoning their cabin after just over a year's time. Soon however, Felix Jones took possession of the old Mulkey cabin and constructed the first orchard in the township. Mulkey's Point also contained significant evidence of Indian camps and hunting grounds. Many of the trinkets and items found were shown to visitors of another early township resident, J. W. McCord.

In 1831 many new citizens moved to the township, including Isaac Davidson who came from Tennessee, but his life in the township would be very short as he died that same year. Davidson became the first burial in the township. The exact date is lost to history, but it occurred in the month of October, 1831. Soon after that same month, William Cross became the second resident to pass on. William was a brother to Solomon Cross and was buried on section thirty-two. In 1832, Harp township had a happier first as it celebrated its first marriage in the township. Mary Cross accepted the proposal of Martin Dale despite her parents opposition, and the couple were married in 1832.

Tyre Harp and Joseph Harp located their families on section twenty-nine in 1831. They came to the township from Overton County, Tennessee, but had lived a brief time in Waynesville, Illinois prior to settling in Harp Township. The first school in the township was taught from the home of Tyre Harp in 1836. The following year, Tyre Harp, Pleasant Smith and Dudley Richards contributed $110 towards paying for a six months school and erected the first schoolhouse, a 16 ft (4.9 m) x18ft foot cabin where Edom Shugert from Tennessee (who had also taught in Tyre Harp's home) took charge of the school. Tyre was also a shoemaker, crafting all of the shoes for his family. The Harp family was very prominent in the township, which is in fact named after their family. They are also credited with being one of the few families of the early settlers to remain permanent residents of the township.

The first land entries recorded in the township are as follows:

April 6, 1831, John Norfleet, entered W 1/2, N.W 1/4 Section 23, 80 acres. June 16, 1831, William Kincaid, entered, 240 acres, Section 24. July 8, 1831, William H. Brown, entered W 1/3, S.W 1/4. August 2, 1831, Parmenius Smallwood, entered W 1/2, S.W. 1/4, Section 33, 80 acres. July 17, 1833, Tyre Harp, entered E 1/2, S.W. 1/4, Section 29, acres. April 21, 1834, Gabriel Watt, entered N.E 1/4, S.E 1/4, Section 24, 40 Acres. January 3, 1835, J. Pue, entered S 1/2, S.E. 1/4, Section 36, 80 acres.

One of the earliest camp-meeting grounds was on section 25 where Winding Clark held services in 1835. Families came from miles around to enjoy the village of cabins erected here. A platform constructed for the preachers and benches arranged of partially hewn logs helped to offer good cheer and spiritual inspiration. Reverend John St. Clair was present during this time.

Jefferson Cross became the first justice of the peace elected to office in the township and Solomon Despain who located in Waynesville in 1830 before locating in Harp Township in 1837 became the first blacksmith to set up shop. Despain was also a Baptist preacher. Despain built his smithy on land owned by William Garrison Wright who had married Tyre Harp's daughter Leah in 1834. A second smithy would later be built near Wilson's mill in 1860 by a man named Leonard.

The first road in the township led from Clinton, IL to Marion and was cut by Hugh L. Davenport. By this time the U.S. mail delivered to Clinton where township residents would commute, which was preferable to the longer trip to Bloomington, Illinois to the north. The Gilman branch of the Illinois Central Railroad passes through the township from east to west, entering on section 24, and leaving on section 30. Much litigation surrounded the railroad from people refusing to honor bonds because of non-compliance by the railroad company, one such matter brought by Thomas Snell on section 20 leading to the construction of a switch in the winter of 1882.

Township veterans served in the Mexican War and in the Black Hawk War. William Harp, Charles Harp, Calvin Paine, Isaac M'Cuddy, David Beebe, Isaac Strain and Joshua Jackson all served in the Mexican War and William Garrison Wright served in the Black Hawk War.

== Geography ==
According to the 2021 census gazetteer files, Harp Township has a total area of 34.76 square miles (90.03 km^{2}), of which 31.19 square miles (80.78 km^{2}) (or 89.73%) is land and 3.57 square miles (9.25 km^{2}) (or 10.27%) is water. Harp Township includes part of Clinton Lake and Clinton Nuclear Generating Station. The North Fork of Salt Creek and Illinois Route 54 pass through the township as well.

=== Unincorporated towns ===
- Birkbeck at 40.176981°N 88.86841°W

(This list is based on USGS data and may include former settlements.)

=== Cemeteries ===
The township contains these two cemeteries: Griffith and Willmore.

=== Airports and landing strips ===
- Thorp Airport

== Demographics ==
As of the 2020 census there were 310 people, 135 households, and 117 families residing in the township. The population density was 8.92 inhabitants per square mile (3.44/km^{2}). There were 136 housing units at an average density of 3.91 per square mile (1.51/km^{2}). The racial makeup of the township was 99.03% White, 0.00% African American, 0.00% Native American, 0.00% Asian, 0.00% Pacific Islander, 0.00% from other races, and 0.97% from two or more races. Hispanic or Latino of any race were 0.00% of the population.

There were 135 households, out of which 35.60% had children under the age of 18 living with them, 76.30% were married couples living together, 10.37% had a female householder with no spouse present, and 13.33% were non-families. 13.30% of all households were made up of individuals, and 13.30% had someone living alone who was 65 years of age or older. The average household size was 2.09 and the average family size was 2.26.

The township's age distribution consisted of 16.0% under the age of 18, 0.0% from 18 to 24, 34.8% from 25 to 44, 31.1% from 45 to 64, and 18.1% who were 65 years of age or older. The median age was 43.7 years. For every 100 females, there were 122.0 males. For every 100 females age 18 and over, there were 104.3 males.

The median income for a household in the township was $76,518, and the median income for a family was $57,375. Males had a median income of $70,833 versus $61,250 for females. The per capita income for the township was $37,949. About 9.4% of families and 8.2% of the population were below the poverty line, including 0.0% of those under age 18 and 45.1% of those age 65 or over.

Historical population
| Census | Pop. | Note | %± |
|---|---|---|---|
| 1930 | 658 | | — |
| 1940 | 698 | | 6.1% |
| 1950 | 602 | | −13.8% |
| 1960 | 532 | | −11.6% |
| 1970 | 440 | | −17.3% |
| 1980 | 270 | | −38.6% |
| 1990 | 250 | | −7.4% |
| 2000 | 381 | | 52.4% |
| 2010 | 311 | | −18.4% |
| 2020 | 310 | | −0.3% |

== School districts ==
- Blue Ridge Community Unit School District 18
- Clinton Community Unit School District 15
- DeLand-Weldon Community Unit School District 57

== Political districts ==
- Illinois's 15th congressional district
- State House District 87
- State Senate District 44
