= Jenkins, Illinois =

- Unincorporated community
- Location within Illinois Location within the United States
- Coordinates: 40°09′10″N 89°02′01″W
- Country: United States
- State: Illinois
- County: DeWitt
- Elevation: 735 ft (224 m)
- Time zone: UTC-6 (Central (CST))
  - Summer (DST): UTC-5 (CDT)
- Area code: 217
- GNIS feature ID: 422847

Jenkins is an unincorporated community in DeWitt County, Illinois, United States. Jenkins is located on Illinois Route 10, 4 miles (6.4 km) west of Clinton.
