= Fullerton, Illinois =

- Unincorporated community
- Location within Illinois Location within the United States
- Coordinates: 40°12′37″N 88°44′40″W
- Country: United States
- State: Illinois
- County: DeWitt
- Elevation: 748 ft (228 m)
- Time zone: UTC-6 (Central (CST))
  - Summer (DST): UTC-5 (CDT)
- Area code: 217
- GNIS feature ID: 422721

Fullerton is an unincorporated community in DeWitt County, Illinois, United States. Fullerton is located at the junction of Illinois Routes 48 and 54, 3 miles (4.8 km) northeast of DeWitt.
