= Wapella =

Wapella may refer to:

- Wapella, Illinois, a village in the United States
- Wapella, Saskatchewan, a town in Canada
