= Oreana, Illinois =

- Village
- Location in Macon County, Illinois
- Coordinates: 39°56′10″N 88°52′22″W
- Country: United States
- State: Illinois
- County: Macon
- Township: Whitmore

Area
  - Total: 0.47 sq mi (1.21 km^{2})
  - Land: 0.47 sq mi (1.21 km^{2})
  - Water: 0 sq mi (0.00 km^{2})
- Elevation: 686 ft (209 m)

Population (2020)
  - Total: 891
  - Density: 1,905/sq mi (735.5/km^{2})
- Time zone: UTC-6 (CST)
  - Summer (DST): UTC-5 (CDT)
- ZIP code: 62554
- Area codes: 217, 447
- FIPS code: 17-56471
- GNIS feature ID: 2399582
- Website: oreanail.com

Oreana is a village in Macon County, Illinois, United States, which had a population of 891 at the 2020 census. It is included in the Decatur, Illinois Metropolitan Statistical Area.

== Geography ==
Oreana is located in northeastern Macon County. Illinois Route 48 passes through the village, leading southwest 9 miles (14 km) to Decatur, the county seat, and northeast 4 miles (6 km) to Argenta.

According to the 2021 census gazetteer files, Oreana has a total area of 0.47 square miles (1.22 km^{2}), all land.

== Demographics ==
Historical population
Census	Pop.	Note	%±
1880	66		—
1960	464		—
1970	1,092		135.3%
1980	999		−8.5%
1990	847		−15.2%
2000	892		5.3%
2010	875		−1.9%
2020	891		1.8%
U.S. Decennial Census

As of the 2020 census there were 891 people, 356 households, and 272 families residing in the village. The population density was 1,903.85 inhabitants per square mile (735.08/km^{2}). There were 389 housing units at an average density of 831.20 per square mile (320.93/km^{2}). The racial makeup of the village was 90.57% White, 0.34% African American, 0.11% Native American, 2.02% Asian, 0.00% Pacific Islander, 1.12% from other races, and 5.84% from two or more races. Hispanic or Latino of any race were 3.59% of the population.

There were 356 households, out of which 39.0% had children under the age of 18 living with them, 70.51% were married couples living together, 2.53% had a female householder with no husband present, and 23.60% were non-families. 17.70% of all households were made up of individuals, and 8.15% had someone living alone who was 65 years of age or older. The average household size was 2.94 and the average family size was 2.68.

The village's age distribution consisted of 27.0% under the age of 18, 5.5% from 18 to 24, 24% from 25 to 44, 28.2% from 45 to 64, and 15.3% who were 65 years of age or older. The median age was 37.8 years. For every 100 females, there were 88.9 males. For every 100 females age 18 and over, there were 86.1 males.

The median income for a household in the village was $74,643, and the median income for a family was $90,000. Males had a median income of $49,474 versus $34,792 for females. The per capita income for the village was $28,441. About 2.2% of families and 4.6% of the population were below the poverty line, including 8.4% of those under age 18 and 2.7% of those age 65 or over.

== Education ==
It is a part of the Argenta-Oreana Community Unit School District 1.
