= Waynesville Township, DeWitt County, Illinois =

Waynesville Township
- Township
- Location in DeWitt County

- DeWitt County's location in Illinois
- Coordinates: 40°15′21″N 89°05′19″W
- Country: United States
- State: Illinois
- County: DeWitt
- Established: November 2, 1858

Area
  - Total: 24.39 sq mi (63.2 km^{2})
  - Land: 24.39 sq mi (63.2 km^{2})
  - Water: 0 sq mi (0 km^{2}) 0%
- Elevation: 699 ft (213 m)

Population (2020)
  - Total: 640
  - Density: 26/sq mi (10/km^{2})
- Time zone: UTC-6 (CST)
  - Summer (DST): UTC-5 (CDT)
- ZIP codes: 61745, 61777, 61778
- FIPS code: 17-039-79462
- GNIS feature ID: 429906

Waynesville Township is one of thirteen townships in DeWitt County, Illinois, USA. As of the 2020 census, its population was 640 and it contained 303 housing units.

== Geography ==
According to the 2021 census gazetteer files, Waynesville Township has a total area of 24.39 square miles (63.17 km^{2}), all land.

=== Cities, towns, villages ===
- Waynesville

=== Cemeteries ===
The township contains these six cemeteries: Big Grove, Evergreen, Fairview, Halsey, Rock Creek and Union.

=== Airports and landing strips ===
- Holt Landing Strip

== Demographics ==
As of the 2020 census there were 640 people, 254 households, and 166 families residing in the township. The population density was 26.24 inhabitants per square mile (10.13/km^{2}). There were 303 housing units at an average density of 12.43 per square mile (4.80/km^{2}). The racial makeup of the township was 93.91% White, 0.63% African American, 0.78% Native American, 0.16% Asian, 0.00% Pacific Islander, 0.63% from other races, and 3.91% from two or more races. Hispanic or Latino of any race were 1.25% of the population.

There were 254 households, out of which 22.80% had children under the age of 18 living with them, 59.84% were married couples living together, 2.76% had a female householder with no spouse present, and 34.65% were non-families. 27.20% of all households were made up of individuals, and 13.40% had someone living alone who was 65 years of age or older. The average household size was 2.34 and the average family size was 2.70.

The township's age distribution consisted of 18.8% under the age of 18, 5.4% from 18 to 24, 28.6% from 25 to 44, 22.4% from 45 to 64, and 24.9% who were 65 years of age or older. The median age was 42.6 years. For every 100 females, there were 100.3 males. For every 100 females age 18 and over, there were 104.7 males.

The median income for a household in the township was $63,333, and the median income for a family was $83,750. Males had a median income of $43,571 versus $46,094 for females. The per capita income for the township was $33,638. About 3.0% of families and 7.2% of the population were below the poverty line, including 3.8% of those under age 18 and 2.7% of those age 65 or over.

Historical population
Census	Pop.	Note	%±
1930	1,005		—
1940	987		−1.8%
1950	865		−12.4%
1960	850		−1.7%
1970	802		−5.6%
1980	884		10.2%
1990	768		−13.1%
2000	669		−12.9%
2010	713		6.6%
2020	640		−10.2%

== School districts ==
- Clinton Community Unit School District 15
- Heyworth Community Unit School District 4
- Olympia Community Unit School District 16

== Political districts ==
- Illinois's 15th congressional district
- State House District 87
- State Senate District 44
