= Decatur Township, Macon County, Illinois =

Coordinates: 39°51′N 88°58′W

Decatur Township
- Township
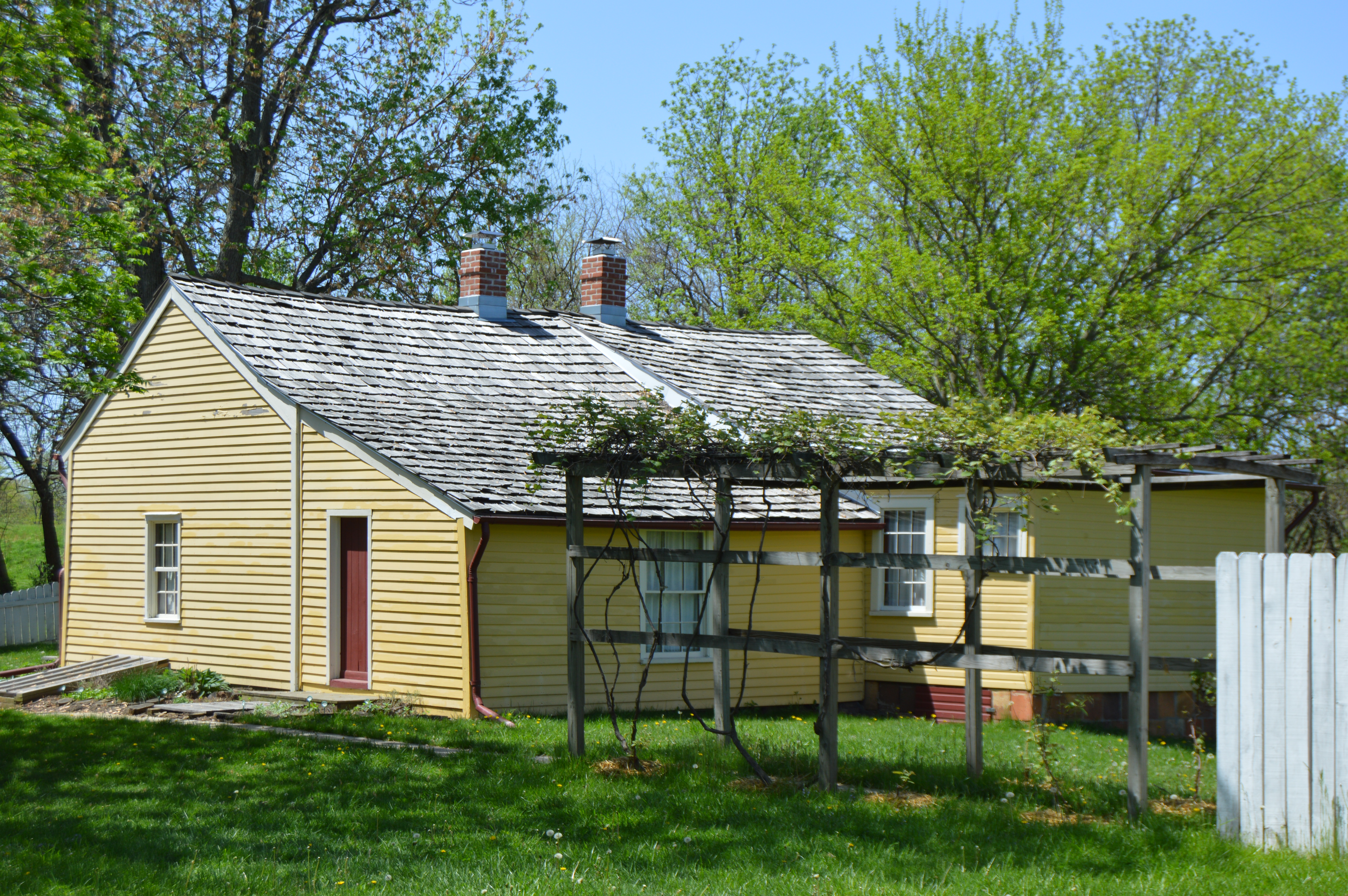
- The Trobaugh-Good House at Rock Springs Conservation Area

- Location in Macon County

- Macon County's location in Illinois
- Country: United States
- State: Illinois
- County: Macon
- Settlement: November 8, 1859

Area
  - Total: 31.11 sq mi (80.6 km^{2})
  - Land: 29.07 sq mi (75.3 km^{2})
  - Water: 2.04 sq mi (5.3 km^{2}) 6.56%

Population (2020)
  - Total: 47,650
  - Density: 1,639/sq mi (632.9/km^{2})
- Time zone: UTC-6 (CST)
  - Summer (DST): UTC-5 (CDT)
- FIPS code: 17-115-18836
- Website: decaturiltownship.com

Decatur Township is in Macon County, Illinois. At the 2020 census, its population was 47,650 and it contained 23,964 housing units.

== Cities and towns ==
- Bearsdale
- Decatur (main part)
- Wyckles Corners

== Adjacent townships ==
- Hickory Point Township (north)
- Whitmore Township (north and northeast)
- Oakley Township (east)
- Long Creek Township (southeast)
- South Wheatland Township (south)
- Blue Mound Township (southwest)
- Harristown Township (west)
- Illini Township (northwest)

== Geography ==
According to the 2021 census gazetteer files, Decatur Township has a total area of 31.11 square miles (80.57 km^{2}), of which 29.07 square miles (75.29 km^{2}) (or 93.44%) is land and 2.04 square miles (5.28 km^{2}) (or 6.56%) is water.

== Demographics ==
As of the 2020 census there were 47,650 people, 20,625 households, and 11,006 families residing in the township. The population density was 1,531.71 inhabitants per square mile (591.40/km^{2}). There were 23,964 housing units at an average density of 770.32 per square mile (297.42/km^{2}). The racial makeup of the township was 58.37% White, 31.91% African American, 0.29% Native American, 0.91% Asian, 0.04% Pacific Islander, 1.23% from other races, and 7.25% from two or more races. Hispanic or Latino of any race were 2.81% of the population.

There were 20,625 households, out of which 24.70% had children under the age of 18 living with them, 32.71% were married couples living together, 16.98% had a female householder with no spouse present, and 46.64% were non-families. 39.90% of all households were made up of individuals, and 14.60% had someone living alone who was 65 years of age or older. The average household size was 2.27 and the average family size was 3.11.

According to the 2020 American Community Survey, township's age distribution consisted of 22.9% under the age of 18, 9.8% from 18 to 24, 24.9% from 25 to 44, 24.7% from 45 to 64, and 17.8% who were 65 years of age or older. The median age was 37.4 years. For every 100 females, there were 92 males. For every 100 females age 18 and over, there were 88.3 males.

The median income for a household in the township was $41,971, and the median income for a family was $55,438. Males had a median income of $41,193 versus $25,298 for females. The per capita income for the township was $24,494. About 18.8% of families and 23.0% of the population were below the poverty line, including 33.4% of those under age 18 and 12.0% of those age 65 or over.

Historical population
Census	Pop.	Note	%±
1990	61,905		—
2000	58,322		−5.8%
2010	52,925		−9.3%
2020	47,638		−10.0%
2024 (est.)	45,999		−3.4%
'
