= Newburg, Illinois =

- Unincorporated community
- Location within Illinois Location within the United States
- Coordinates: 39°58′52″N 88°48′14″W
- Country: United States
- State: Illinois
- County: Macon
- Elevation: 682 ft (208 m)
- Time zone: UTC-6 (Central (CST))
  - Summer (DST): UTC-5 (CDT)
- Area code: 217
- GNIS feature ID: 414482

Newburg is an unincorporated community in Friends Creek Township, Macon County, Illinois, United States. The community is located at the intersection of Newburg Road and Cemetery Road 1 mile (1.6 km) east of Argenta.
