= Clinton Power Station =

Nuclear power plant in DeWitt County, Illinois

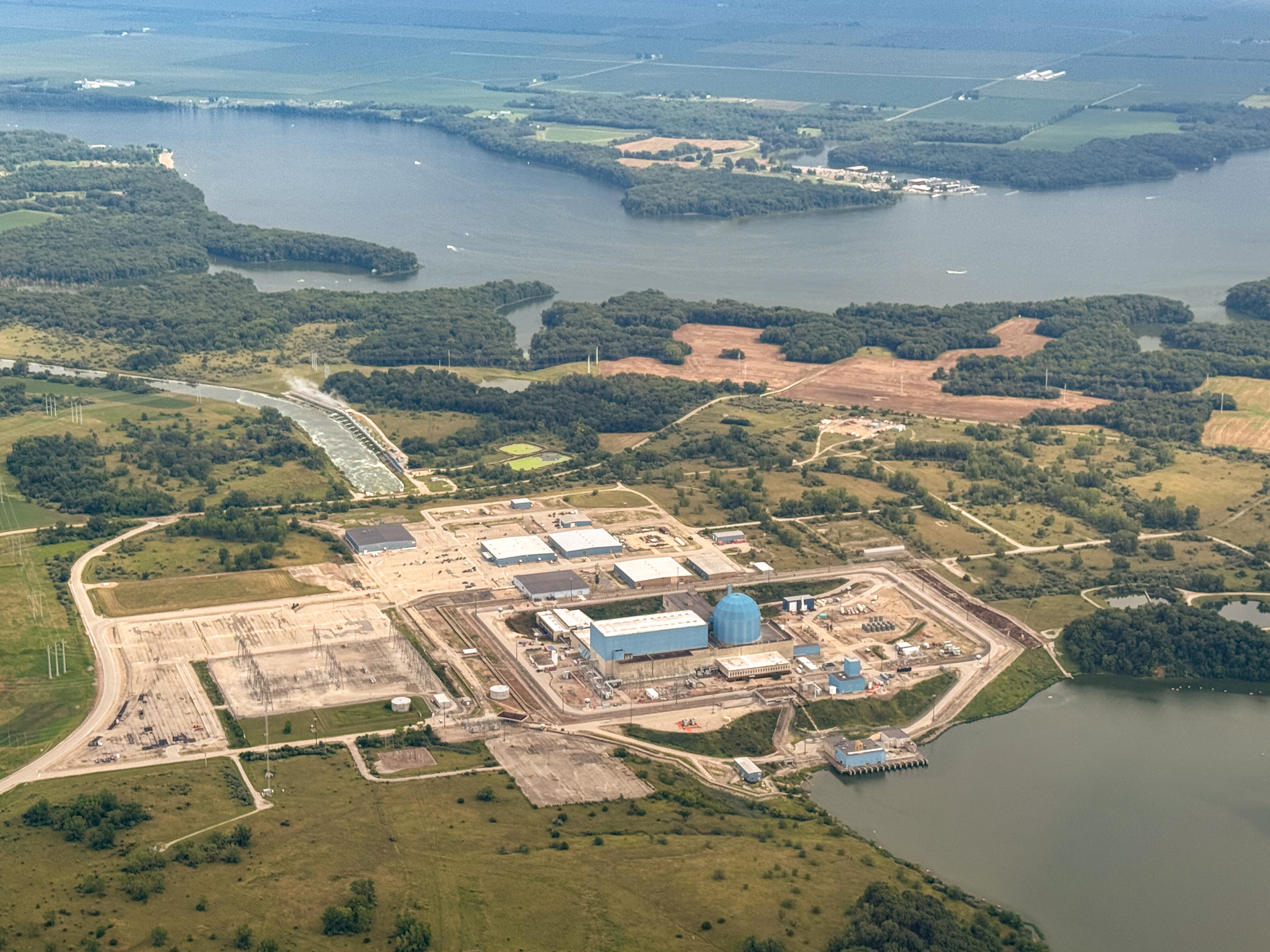
- Aerial view of the Clinton Power Station
- Country: United States
- Location: Harp Township, DeWitt County, near Clinton, Illinois
- Coordinates: 40°10′20″N 88°50′6″W
- Status: Operational
- Construction began: October 1, 1975
- Commission date: November 24, 1987
- Construction cost: $4.25 billion
- Owner: Constellation Energy
- Operator: Constellation Energy

Nuclear power station
- Reactor type: BWR
- Reactor supplier: General Electric
- Cooling source: Clinton Lake (Note: Clinton Lake is an artificial lake fed by Salt Creek)
- Thermal capacity: 1 × 3473 MW_{th}

Power generation
- Units operational: 1 × 1138 MW
- Make and model: BWR-6 (Mark 3)
- Units cancelled: 1 × 933 MW
- Nameplate capacity: 1138 MW
- Capacity factor: 89.84% (2017); 78.50% (lifetime)
- Annual net output: 8358 GWh (2017)

External links
- Website: Clinton Power Station
- Commons: Related media on Commons

The Clinton Power Station is a nuclear power plant located near Clinton, Illinois, USA. The power station began commercial operation on November 24, 1987 and has a nominal net electric output of 1062 MWe. Due to inflation and cost overruns, Clinton's final construction cost was $4.25 billion ($12 billion today), nearly 1,000% over the original budget of $430 million and seven years behind schedule.

The station has a single generation II General Electric Boiling Water Reactor. The present reactor operating license was issued April 17, 1987, and will expire September 29, 2026. Plans for a second reactor were shelved. Exelon, the former owner and operator of the present reactor, announced plans to permanently close the power station in June 2017, due to the plants struggles to compete economically in wholesale markets, resulting in a loss of millions of dollars in recent years. The plans for closure were canceled, however, when the Illinois State Legislature passed and the Illinois Governor signed SB 2814, The Future Energy Jobs Bill. The legislation provides Zero Emission Credits for the plants' CO_{2}-free electricity. The consequences of continued operation include saving 4,200 jobs and the annual generation of 22 billion kWhs of CO_{2}-free energy.

The surrounding 14,300 acres (58 km^{2}) site and adjacent 5,000 acres (20 km^{2}) cooling reservoir, Clinton Lake, is owned by the operator, but hosts the Clinton Lake State Recreation Area and is open to public for a large range of outdoor activities. Only around 150 acres (0.6 km^{2}) are actually used by the plant's buildings and operation areas.

== Electricity production ==
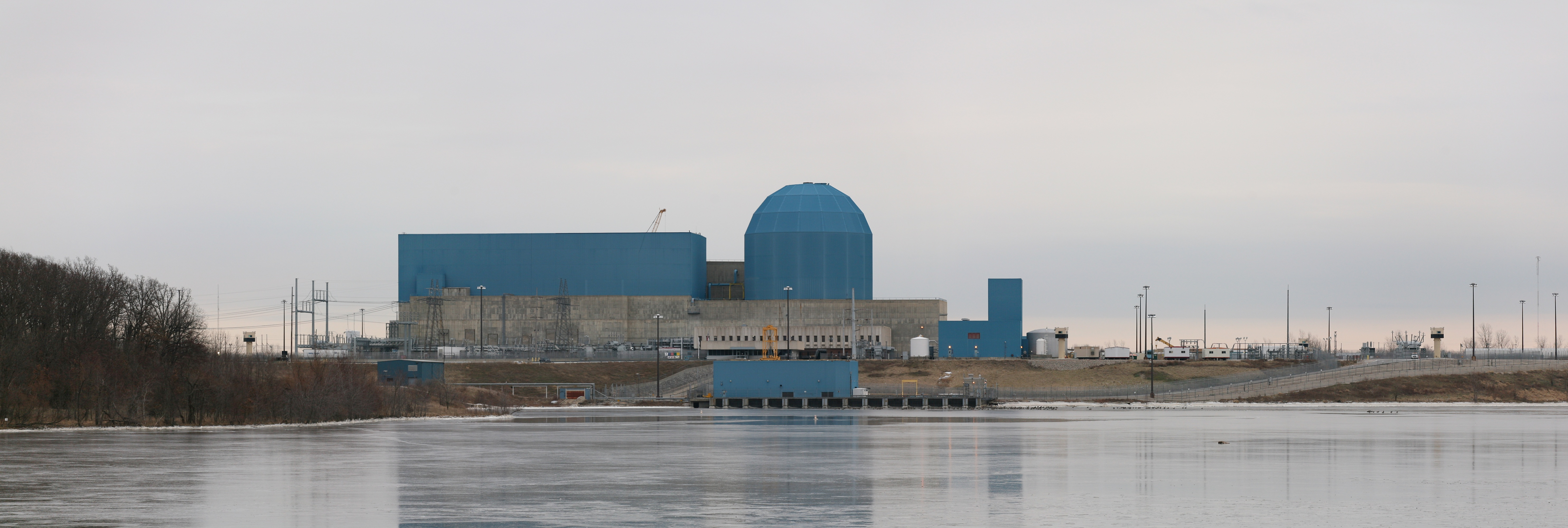
View of the power station

Generation (MWh) of Clinton Power Station
Year	Jan	Feb	Mar	Apr	May	Jun	Jul	Aug	Sep	Oct	Nov	Dec	Annual (Total)
2001	693,528	557,943	692,222	670,968	620,829	665,724	639,211	680,796	661,884	691,962	669,337	634,560	7,878,964
2002	686,395	622,523	681,258	10,524	458,081	734,215	709,581	765,868	729,480	760,914	736,406	762,212	7,657,457
2003	756,222	686,721	762,014	666,612	758,477	749,390	774,100	773,936	731,688	717,533	725,407	596,889	8,698,989
2004	660,840	64,713	679,850	748,191	607,147	756,957	636,993	782,402	753,763	782,140	758,516	782,457	8,013,969
2005	729,820	497,733	600,267	727,138	779,612	755,483	780,877	769,500	740,927	784,439	757,141	769,137	8,692,074
2006	711,706	16,769	605,509	768,766	791,504	769,539	793,326	718,172	765,464	795,853	770,550	725,149	8,232,307
2007	796,303	719,640	781,718	777,209	794,186	705,543	791,374	787,282	762,709	795,073	773,891	765,508	9,250,436
2008	250,571	545,163	800,267	775,024	798,451	770,414	794,643	794,021	767,565	798,612	775,841	679,331	8,549,903
2009	799,748	717,787	798,222	774,484	766,014	768,172	793,462	792,113	713,349	422,334	771,859	770,370	8,887,914
2010	229,792	507,337	800,980	776,268	796,741	769,311	791,383	790,533	769,119	801,339	777,272	801,923	8,611,998
2011	802,964	720,850	802,765	763,633	793,708	763,581	767,884	784,185	759,589	794,197	731,878	186,232	8,671,466
2012	800,875	748,502	794,991	772,445	791,392	765,358	784,073	787,156	762,308	796,953	774,233	795,440	9,373,726
2013	798,204	693,478	722,847	666,502	788,048	763,789	784,181	781,022	755,895	152,499	721,206	567,877	8,195,548
2014	798,626	705,590	553,245	771,969	763,235	787,715	767,386	791,123	763,609	797,622	774,000	797,591	9,071,711
2015	666,063	722,716	795,311	644,815	322,799	771,162	797,145	793,930	766,668	800,523	778,391	804,314	8,663,837
2016	803,530	751,282	799,399	718,766	439,549	769,819	795,383	794,360	658,370	802,938	778,735	802,322	8,914,453
2017	805,837	727,742	801,261	746,024	166,378	614,941	742,963	795,048	750,871	797,275	775,132	624,864	8,348,336
2018	800,713	699,423	797,172	731,280	208,998	769,275	791,891	741,340	679,613	685,950	639,256	801,775	8,346,686
2019	780,176	723,735	803,490	780,927	780,345	771,775	792,713	651,768	377,261	315,412	782,823	802,864	8,363,289
2020	807,109	753,653	794,890	779,734	802,662	771,258	792,200	789,696	774,848	811,032	776,256	809,143	9,462,481
2021	759,598	731,141	758,892	777,328	799,985	767,358	793,577	783,906	625,754	8,809	739,897	802,461	8,348,706
2022	639,079	730,967	804,557	772,055	789,691	763,008	784,386	788,027	756,455	805,538	782,147	808,112	9,223,022
2023	801,403	588,335	806,281	772,864	409,189	779,336	805,762	796,540	239,727	496,236	791,248	814,707	8,401,628
2024	815,580	763,954	809,602	790,338	809,776	784,757	808,820	809,167	766,851	813,624	786,569	816,639	9,575,677
2025	815,751	736,440	814,207	787,711	805,038	776,160	791,137	740,942	151,402	330,690	776,094	811,967	8,337,539
2026	817,021	738,410	812,514	789,528	810,008	779,871	804,975	808,875					--

== Transfer of ownership to Exelon ==
There were a number of problems during the first several years of operation. For example, the facility was down for maintenance frequently and was out of service for almost half of the time from September 1988 to October 1989. In 1997, it was also said to be producing "some of the highest electric rates in the midwest". After less than a decade of operation the plant's original owner, Illinois Power, had to close it in 1996 following some technical problems and safety violations resulting in a $450,000 fine.

Having deduced that it was not economical to own and operate only one nuclear generating station in the newly deregulated market, they kept it shut down during around 3 years whilst looking for an interested buyer. Exelon Corporation bought it for a more modest price of $40 million, with the purchase including the fuel in the reactor vessel and responsibility of all the radioactive waste in the spent fuel storage pool. The Operator and Owner is Constellation Energy following its spin-off from Exelon.

Soon after acquiring the power plant, Exelon made in 2001 a request to uprate its power by 20%, from 2894 MWt to 3473 MWt, resulting in an increase of 193 MWe, the largest approved by the NRC until 2012.

== Production of medical radio-isotopes ==
In January 2010, GE-Hitachi announced that the station will begin producing cobalt-60. The technology is soon to be installed at the Clinton boiling water reactor during Clinton's planned maintenance and refueling outage in order to produce cobalt-60. The radioactive isotope is used for a variety of medical and industrial purposes including cancer therapy, sterilization of medical equipment, food irradiation and materials testing.

It is produced by inserting a 'target' rod rich in non-radioactive cobalt-59 into a reactor core where free neutrons will be captured, turning cobalt-59 into cobalt-60. After retrieval from the core, processing can extract the cobalt-60 for manufacture into a useful radiation source. The vast majority of the world's cobalt-60 supply - over 80% - has traditionally come from Canada's National Research Universal (NRU) reactor at Chalk River. In general, the supply situation for medical and industrial isotopes is shaky thanks to a reliance on this kind of aging research reactor. Clinton will be the only light water reactor currently producing cobalt-60.

Exelon Nuclear president Charles Pardee said: "We view this as an opportunity for Exelon to support an important medical technology that saves people's lives."

It was announced in September 2011 that GE-Hitachi Nuclear Energy and Exelon commissioned a feasibility study into creating Molybdenum-99 (Mo-99) at the reactor. Mo-99 decays to produce technetium-99m (Tc-99m) that is used in around 50 million medical diagnostic imaging procedures every year. With a half-life of only six hours, Tc-99m is too short-lived to be transported to hospitals so is produced where it is needed in generators containing Mo-99. As Mo-99 itself has a half-life of only 66 hours, the world needs reliable, steady supplies of the isotope, most of which is made by irradiating uranium-235 targets inside a research reactor.

Most of the world's Mo-99 comes from only five research reactors: Canada's NRU, the Netherlands' HFR, Belgium's BR-2, France's Osiris and South Africa's Safari-1. Issues at some of the reactors in recent years have led to worldwide problems with the supply of this vital isotope.

== Future plans ==
In September 2003, Exelon submitted an Early Site Permit to place a second reactor at the Clinton site — this was approved March 15, 2007. The Early Site Permit does not actually grant any type of license to begin building a second reactor, although it offers the operator an avenue to begin the approval process leading to construction and operation of an additional power reactor at the site. According to the ESP, the new plant design will be of the AP1000 type, although the ESP does not state what gross wattage has been selected.

In June 2016, plans for the second reactor were shelved, and reactor 1 was to be shut down in June 2017. The plant was struggling to compete in wholesale electricity markets, resulting in a loss of millions of dollars in recent years. Shutdown plans were cancelled with the passage of Illinois Senate Bill 2814.

In December 2016, Illinois voted to subsidize Exelon with 1c/kWh or $235 million per year (depending on electricity rates) to keep Clinton and Quad Cities Nuclear Generating Station open for at least 10 years, as natural gas had decreased rates.

In October 2022, Constellation announced they are seeking to extend Clinton's operating license to 2047.

== Surrounding population ==
The Nuclear Regulatory Commission defines two emergency planning zones around nuclear power plants: a plume exposure pathway zone with a radius of 10 miles (16 km), concerned primarily with exposure to, and inhalation of, airborne radioactive contamination, and an ingestion pathway zone of about 50 miles (80 km), concerned primarily with ingestion of food and liquid contaminated by radioactivity.

The 2010 U.S. population within 10 miles (16 km) of Clinton was 14,677, a decrease of 0.4 percent in a decade, according to an analysis of U.S. Census data for msnbc.com. The 2010 U.S. population within 50 miles (80 km) was 813,658, an increase of 5.7 percent since 2000. Cities within 50 miles include Champaign, Decatur, Bloomington-Normal, as well as portions of Springfield, and the Peoria Metro Area.

== Seismic risk ==
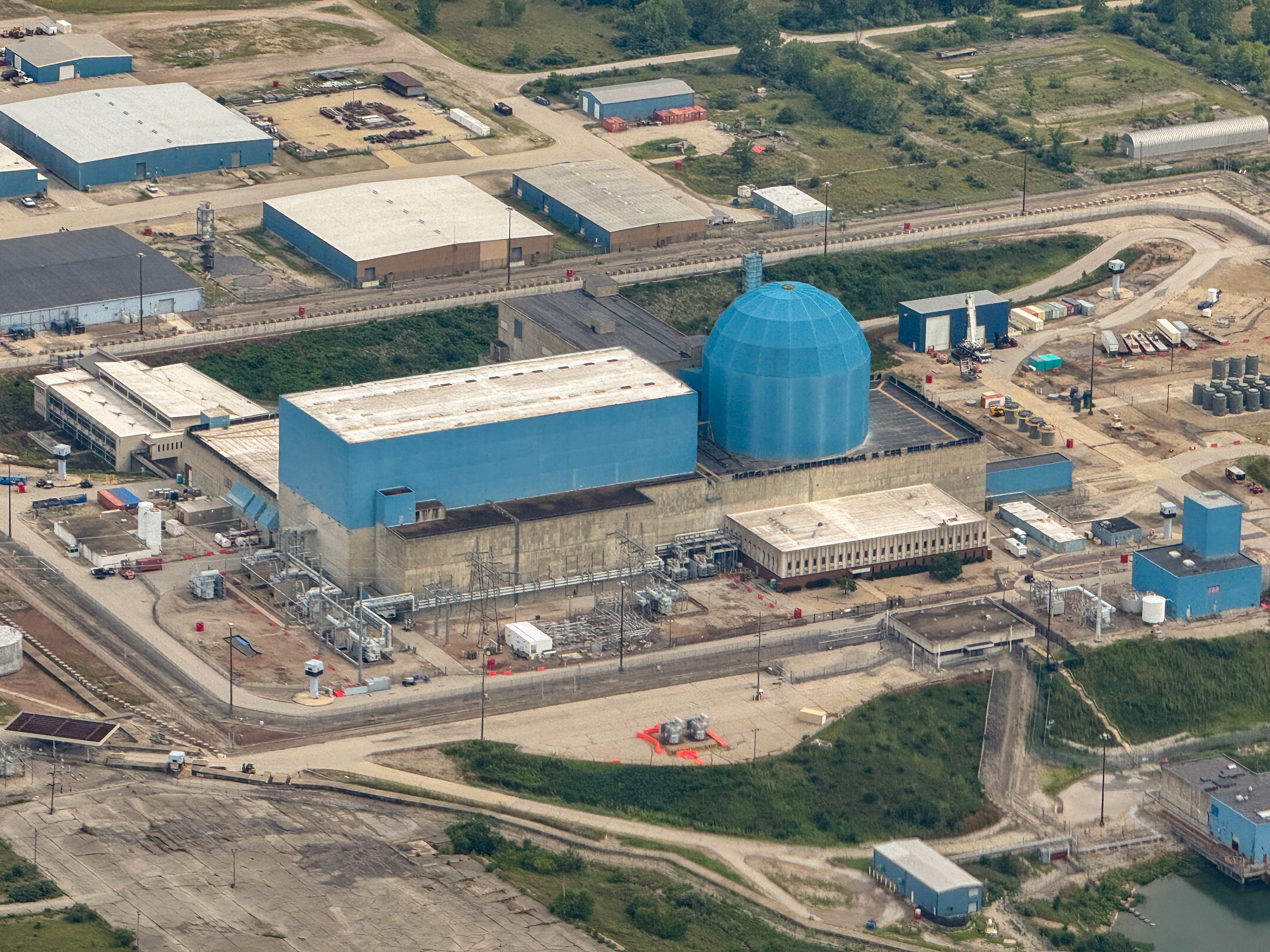
Aerial view

The Nuclear Regulatory Commission's estimate of the risk each year of an earthquake intense enough to cause core damage to the reactor at Clinton was 1 in 400,000, according to an NRC study published in August 2010.

== In popular culture ==
Inspired by the nearby power station, Clinton radio station WHOW changed its motto to "WHOW, your radio active station" in April 1989.

Inspired by the fact that Clinton Lake was created to provide cooling for the nuclear power station the Clinton Lake Sailing Association hosts a popular annual Midwestern regatta known as The Glow In The Dark Regatta. This regatta attracts sailboat racers from all over the country including Florida, Ohio, Minnesota, Wisconsin, Pennsylvania, Maryland, Michigan, and more. In 2018 there were 34 teams registered from 8 states.
