= Wilson Township, DeWitt County, Illinois =

Wilson Township
- Township
- Location in DeWitt County

- DeWitt County's location in Illinois
- Coordinates: 40°15′38″N 88°52′17″W
- Country: United States
- State: Illinois
- County: DeWitt
- Established: November 2, 1858

Area
  - Total: 24.37 sq mi (63.1 km^{2})
  - Land: 24.33 sq mi (63.0 km^{2})
  - Water: 0.04 sq mi (0.10 km^{2}) 0.15%
- Elevation: 797 ft (243 m)

Population (2020)
  - Total: 122
  - Density: 5.01/sq mi (1.94/km^{2})
- Time zone: UTC-6 (CST)
  - Summer (DST): UTC-5 (CDT)
- ZIP codes: 61727, 61735, 61745, 61752, 61777
- FIPS code: 17-039-82140
- GNIS feature ID: 429942

Wilson Township is one of thirteen townships in DeWitt County, Illinois, USA. As of the 2020 census, its population was 122 and it contained 65 housing units.

== Geography ==
According to the 2021 census gazetteer files, Wilson Township has a total area of 24.37 square miles (63.12 km^{2}), of which 24.33 square miles (63.01 km^{2}) (or 99.85%) is land and 0.04 square miles (0.10 km^{2}) (or 0.15%) is water.

=== Unincorporated towns ===
- Solomon at 40.248925°N 88.822852°W

(This list is based on USGS data and may include former settlements.)

=== Cemeteries ===
The township contains these two cemeteries: Walden and Walters.

== Demographics ==
As of the 2020 census there were 122 people, 42 households, and 42 families residing in the township. The population density was 5.01 inhabitants per square mile (1.93/km^{2}). There were 65 housing units at an average density of 2.67 per square mile (1.03/km^{2}). The racial makeup of the township was 99.18% White, 0.00% African American, 0.00% Native American, 0.00% Asian, 0.00% Pacific Islander, 0.00% from other races, and 0.82% from two or more races. Hispanic or Latino of any race were 0.00% of the population.

There were 42 households, out of which 50.00% had children under the age of 18 living with them, and 100.00% were married couples living together. The average household size was 3.31 and the average family size was 3.31.

The township's age distribution consisted of 44.6% under the age of 18, none from 18 to 24, 36.8% from 25 to 44, 18.7% from 45 to 64, and none who were 65 years of age or older. The median age was 31.8 years. For every 100 females, there were 195.7 males. For every 100 females age 18 and over, there were 120.0 males.

The median income for a household in the township was $46,500, and the median income for a family was $46,500. Males had a median income of $25,833 versus $24,083 for females. The per capita income for the township was $16,385. None of the population was below the poverty line.

Historical population
| Census | Pop. | Note | %± |
|---|---|---|---|
| 1930 | 466 | | — |
| 1940 | 429 | | −7.9% |
| 1950 | 335 | | −21.9% |
| 1960 | 336 | | 0.3% |
| 1970 | 252 | | −25.0% |
| 1980 | 197 | | −21.8% |
| 1990 | 150 | | −23.9% |
| 2000 | 155 | | 3.3% |
| 2010 | 149 | | −3.9% |
| 2020 | 122 | | −18.1% |

== School districts ==
- Clinton Community Unit School District 15
- Le Roy Community Unit School District 2

== Political districts ==
- Illinois's 15th congressional district
- State House District 87
- State Senate District 44
