= Bearsdale, Illinois =

- Unincorporated community
- Location within Illinois Location within the United States
- Coordinates: 39°53′49″N 89°00′40″W
- Country: United States
- State: Illinois
- County: Macon
- Elevation: 689 ft (210 m)
- Time zone: UTC-6 (Central (CST))
  - Summer (DST): UTC-5 (CDT)
- Area code: 217
- GNIS feature ID: 424534

Bearsdale is an unincorporated community in Hickory Point Township, Macon County, Illinois, United States. Bearsdale is located along Illinois Route 121, 4.7 miles (7.6 km) northwest of downtown Decatur. Platted in May 1892 for Samuel E. Bear, owner of the SE quarter of section 30, Hickory Point Township.
