= Rutledge Township, DeWitt County, Illinois =

Rutledge Township
- Township
- Location in DeWitt County

- DeWitt County's location in Illinois
- Coordinates: 40°15′32″N 88°45′34″W
- Country: United States
- State: Illinois
- County: DeWitt
- Established: November 2, 1858

Area
  - Total: 24.49 sq mi (63.4 km^{2})
  - Land: 24.47 sq mi (63.4 km^{2})
  - Water: 0.02 sq mi (0.052 km^{2}) 0.08%
- Elevation: 750 ft (230 m)

Population (2020)
  - Total: 136
  - Density: 5.56/sq mi (2.15/km^{2})
- Time zone: UTC-6 (CST)
  - Summer (DST): UTC-5 (CDT)
- ZIP codes: 61735, 61752, 61842
- FIPS code: 17-039-66469
- GNIS feature ID: 429689

Rutledge Township is one of thirteen townships in DeWitt County, Illinois, USA. As of the 2020 census, its population was 136 and it contained 63 housing units. Rutledge Township changed its name from Douglas Township on June 7, 1859.

== Geography ==
According to the 2021 census gazetteer files, Rutledge Township has a total area of 24.49 square miles (63.43 km^{2}), of which 24.47 square miles (63.38 km^{2}) (or 99.92%) is land and 0.02 square miles (0.05 km^{2}) (or 0.08%) is water.

=== Cemeteries ===
The township contains the Johnson Cemetery.

== Demographics ==
As of the 2020 census there were 136 people, 8 households, and 8 families residing in the township. The population density was 5.55 inhabitants per square mile (2.14/km^{2}). There were 63 housing units at an average density of 2.57 per square mile (0.99/km^{2}). The racial makeup of the township was 97.79% White, 0.00% African American, 0.00% Native American, 0.74% Asian, 0.00% Pacific Islander, 0.00% from other races, and 1.47% from two or more races. Hispanic or Latino of any race were 2.21% of the population.

There were 8 households, out of which none had children under the age of 18 living with them and 100.00% were married couples living together. The average household size was 2.13 and the average family size was 2.13.

The township's age distribution consisted of 100.0% who were 65 years of age or older. For every 100 females, there were 88.9 males. For every 100 females age 18 and over, there were 88.9 males.

== School districts ==
- Blue Ridge Community Unit School District 18
- Clinton Community Unit School District 15
- Le Roy Community Unit School District 2

Historical population
Census	Pop.	Note	%±
1930	432		—
1940	344		−20.4%
1950	285		−17.2%
1960	307		7.7%
1970	229		−25.4%
1980	229		0.0%
1990	189		−17.5%
2000	201		6.3%
2010	177		−11.9%
2020	136		−23.2%

== Political districts ==
- Illinois's 15th congressional district
- State House District 87
- State Senate District 44
