= Clintonia Township, DeWitt County, Illinois =

Clintonia Township
- Township
- Location in DeWitt County

- DeWitt County's location in Illinois
- Coordinates: 40°10′44″N 88°58′14″W
- Country: United States
- State: Illinois
- County: DeWitt
- Established: November 2, 1858

Area
  - Total: 30.08 sq mi (77.9 km^{2})
  - Land: 30.07 sq mi (77.9 km^{2})
  - Water: 0.01 sq mi (0.026 km^{2}) 0.03%
- Elevation: 735 ft (224 m)

Population (2020)
  - Total: 7,315
  - Density: 243.3/sq mi (93.93/km^{2})
- Time zone: UTC-6 (CST)
  - Summer (DST): UTC-5 (CDT)
- ZIP codes: 61727, 61777
- FIPS code: 17-039-15014
- GNIS feature ID: 428822
- Website: www.clintoniatownship.com

Clintonia Township is one of thirteen townships in DeWitt County, Illinois, USA. As of the 2020 census, its population was 7,315 and it contained 3,543 housing units. Clintonia Township changed its name from Clinton Township June 7, 1859.

== Geography ==
According to the 2021 census gazetteer files, Clintonia Township has a total area of 30.08 square miles (77.91 km^{2}), of which 30.07 square miles (77.88 km^{2}) (or 99.97%) is land and 0.01 square miles (0.03 km^{2}) (or 0.03%) is water.

=== Cities, towns, villages ===
- Clinton (all but south edge)

=== Cemeteries ===
The township contains these four cemeteries: Memorial Park, Oak Park, Weaver and Woodlawn.

=== Major highways ===
- U.S. Route 51
- Illinois Route 10
- Illinois Route 54

== Demographics ==
As of the 2020 census there were 7,315 people, 3,197 households, and 1,812 families residing in the township. The population density was 243.18 inhabitants per square mile (93.89/km^{2}). There were 3,543 housing units at an average density of 117.78 per square mile (45.48/km^{2}). The racial makeup of the township was 91.43% White, 1.04% African American, 0.25% Native American, 0.29% Asian, 0.15% Pacific Islander, 2.56% from other races, and 4.29% from two or more races. Hispanic or Latino of any race were 5.13% of the population.

There were 3,197 households, out of which 25.60% had children under the age of 18 living with them, 39.41% were married couples living together, 13.04% had a female householder with no spouse present, and 43.32% were non-families. 40.10% of all households were made up of individuals, and 15.70% had someone living alone who was 65 years of age or older. The average household size was 2.24 and the average family size was 2.98.

The township's age distribution consisted of 24.3% under the age of 18, 8.6% from 18 to 24, 24.4% from 25 to 44, 23.9% from 45 to 64, and 18.7% who were 65 years of age or older. The median age was 38.9 years. For every 100 females, there were 94.5 males. For every 100 females age 18 and over, there were 95.2 males.

The median income for a household in the township was $49,279, and the median income for a family was $66,141. Males had a median income of $43,068 versus $25,422 for females. The per capita income for the township was $28,407. About 8.6% of families and 14.4% of the population were below the poverty line, including 23.7% of those under age 18 and 5.1% of those age 65 or over.

Historical population
Census	Pop.	Note	%±
1930	7,241		—
1940	7,538		4.1%
1950	7,124		−5.5%
1960	7,881		10.6%
1970	8,089		2.6%
1980	8,524		5.4%
1990	7,860		−7.8%
2000	7,805		−0.7%
2010	7,832		0.3%
2020	7,315		−6.6%

== School districts ==
- Clinton Community Unit School District 15

== Political districts ==
- United States Congressional District 15
- State House District 101
- State Senate District 51
