= Whitmore Township, Macon County, Illinois =

Whitmore Township
- Township
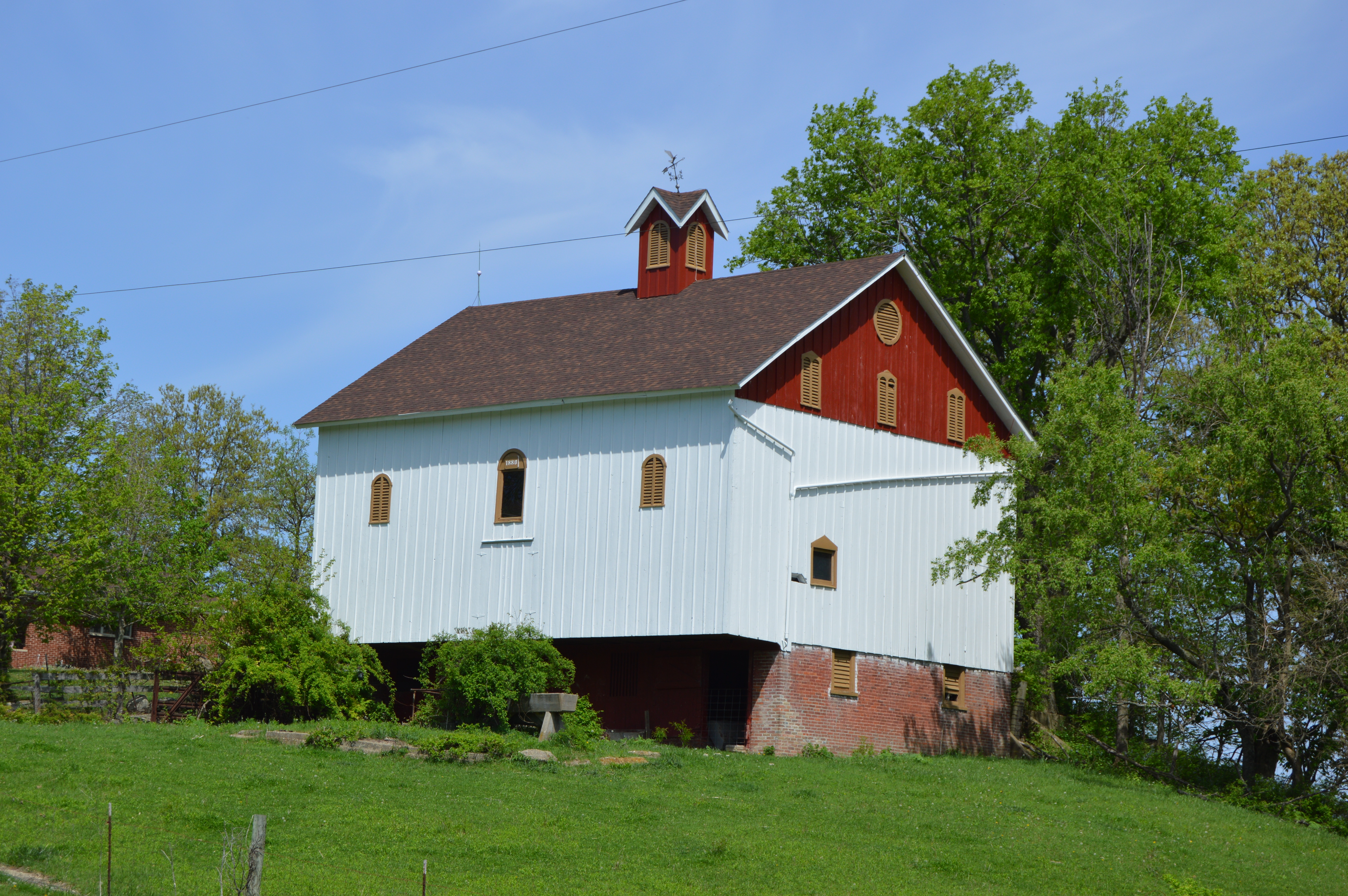
- A barn southeast of Oreana

- Location in Macon County

- Macon County's location in Illinois
- Coordinates: 39°56′N 88°51′W
- Country: United States
- State: Illinois
- County: Macon
- Settlement: November 8, 1859

Area
  - Total: 36.90 sq mi (95.6 km^{2})
  - Land: 35.90 sq mi (93.0 km^{2})
  - Water: 1.00 sq mi (2.6 km^{2}) 2.70%
- Elevation: 682 ft (208 m)

Population (2020)
  - Total: 4,311
  - Density: 120.1/sq mi (46.36/km^{2})
- Time zone: UTC-6 (CST)
  - Summer (DST): UTC-5 (CDT)
- FIPS code: 17-115-81464

Whitmore Township is located in Macon County, Illinois. As of the 2020 census, its population was 4,311 and it contained 1,894 housing units.

== Cities and towns ==
- Larkdale
- Oreana

== Adjacent townships ==
- Friends Creek Township (north)
- Willow Branch Township, Piatt County (northeast, east and southeast)
- Oakley Township (south)
- Decatur Township (south and southwest)
- Hickory Point Township (west)
- Maroa Township (northwest)

== Geography ==
According to the 2021 census gazetteer files, Whitmore Township has a total area of 36.90 square miles (95.57 km^{2}), of which 35.90 square miles (92.98 km^{2}) (or 97.30%) is land and 1.00 square mile (2.59 km^{2}) (or 2.70%) is water.

== Demographics ==
As of the 2020 census there were 4,311 people, 1,662 households, and 1,185 families residing in the township. The population density was 116.84 inhabitants per square mile (45.11/km^{2}). There were 1,894 housing units at an average density of 51.33 per square mile (19.82/km^{2}). The racial makeup of the township was 76.69% White, 13.62% African American, 0.14% Native American, 0.88% Asian, 0.00% Pacific Islander, 1.95% from other races, and 6.73% from two or more races. Hispanic or Latino of any race were 3.25% of the population.

There were 1,662 households, out of which 32.30% had children under the age of 18 living with them, 57.58% were married couples living together, 7.46% had a female householder with no spouse present, and 28.70% were non-families. 27.40% of all households were made up of individuals, and 16.20% had someone living alone who was 65 years of age or older. The average household size was 2.55 and the average family size was 3.07.

According to the 2020 American Community Survey, township's age distribution consisted of 21.9% under the age of 18, 9.2% from 18 to 24, 20.3% from 25 to 44, 26.7% from 45 to 64, and 21.9% who were 65 years of age or older. The median age was 44.0 years. For every 100 females, there were 94.4 males. For every 100 females age 18 and over, there were 91.8 males.

The median income for a household in the township was $67,188, and the median income for a family was $87,762. Males had a median income of $42,806 versus $30,655 for females. The per capita income for the township was $29,975. About 5.0% of families and 5.9% of the population were below the poverty line, including 8.1% of those under age 18 and 8.8% of those age 65 or over.

Historical population
| Census | Pop. | Note | %± |
|---|---|---|---|
| 2000 | 4,474 | | — |
| 2010 | 4,471 | | −0.1% |
| 2020 | 4,311 | | −3.6% |
U.S. Decennial Census
