= Carle Springs, Illinois =

- Unincorporated community
- Location within Illinois
- Coordinates: 40°15′13″N 88°58′01″W
- Country: United States
- State: Illinois
- County: DeWitt
- Elevation: 735 ft (224 m)
- Time zone: UTC-6 (Central (CST))
  - Summer (DST): UTC-5 (CDT)
- Area code: 217
- GNIS feature ID: 422529

Carle Springs is an unincorporated community in DeWitt County, Illinois, United States. Carle Springs is 2 miles (3.2 km) north of Wapella.
