= Creek Township, DeWitt County, Illinois =

Creek Township
- Township
- Location in DeWitt County

- DeWitt County's location in Illinois
- Coordinates: 40°05′27″N 88°51′20″W
- Country: United States
- State: Illinois
- County: DeWitt
- Established: November 2, 1858

Area
  - Total: 36.82 sq mi (95.4 km^{2})
  - Land: 35.41 sq mi (91.7 km^{2})
  - Water: 1.42 sq mi (3.7 km^{2}) 3.85%
- Elevation: 712 ft (217 m)

Population (2020)
  - Total: 479
  - Density: 13.5/sq mi (5.22/km^{2})
- Time zone: UTC-6 (CST)
  - Summer (DST): UTC-5 (CDT)
- ZIP codes: 61727, 61735, 61750, 61882
- FIPS code: 17-039-17302
- GNIS feature ID: 428853

Creek Township is one of thirteen townships in DeWitt County, Illinois, USA. As of the 2020 census, its population was 479 and it contained 203 housing units. The township contains the east half of Weldon Springs State Park.

== Geography ==
According to the 2021 census gazetteer files, Creek Township has a total area of 36.82 square miles (95.36 km^{2}), of which 35.41 square miles (91.71 km^{2}) (or 96.15%) is land and 1.42 square miles (3.68 km^{2}) (or 3.85%) is water.

=== Unincorporated towns ===
- Lane at 40.122536°N 88.855632°W

=== Cemeteries ===
The township contains these two cemeteries: Lisenby and Rose.

=== Airports and landing strips ===
- Martin RLA Airport

== Demographics ==
As of the 2020 census there were 479 people, 168 households, and 145 families residing in the township. The population density was 13.01 inhabitants per square mile (5.02/km^{2}). There were 203 housing units at an average density of 5.51 per square mile (2.13/km^{2}). The racial makeup of the township was 97.91% White, 0.21% African American, 0.00% Native American, 0.21% Asian, 0.21% Pacific Islander, 0.42% from other races, and 1.04% from two or more races. Hispanic or Latino of any race were 1.04% of the population.

There were 168 households, out of which 31.50% had children under the age of 18 living with them, 69.05% were married couples living together, 7.14% had a female householder with no spouse present, and 13.69% were non-families. 13.70% of all households were made up of individuals, and 0.00% had someone living alone who was 65 years of age or older. The average household size was 3.09 and the average family size was 3.42.

The township's age distribution consisted of 32.9% under the age of 18, 10.0% from 18 to 24, 22.5% from 25 to 44, 24.2% from 45 to 64, and 10.4% who were 65 years of age or older. The median age was 30.8 years. For every 100 females, there were 139.2 males. For every 100 females age 18 and over, there were 148.6 males.

The median income for a household in the township was $59,821, and the median income for a family was $86,979. Males had a median income of $51,016 versus $36,979 for females. The per capita income for the township was $31,324. About 4.1% of families and 7.3% of the population were below the poverty line, including 15.8% of those under age 18 and none of those age 65 or over.

Historical population
Census	Pop.	Note	%±
1930	907		—
1940	827		−8.8%
1950	704		−14.9%
1960	604		−14.2%
1970	529		−12.4%
1980	489		−7.6%
1990	412		−15.7%
2000	363		−11.9%
2010	471		29.8%
2020	479		1.7%

== School districts ==
- Argenta-Oreana Community Unit School District 1
- Clinton Community Unit School District 15
- DeLand-Weldon Community Unit School District 57
- Maroa-Forsyth Community Unit School District 2

== Political districts ==
- Illinois's 15th congressional district
- State House District 87
- State Senate District 44
