= Friends Creek Conservation Area =

Coordinates: 40.026°N 88.790°W

The Friends Creek Conservation Area is a 616-acre (2.5 km^{2}) natural area in the U.S. state of Illinois, located in Friends Creek Township near Cisco in northeastern Macon County. The conservation area, located 18 miles (29 km) north of Decatur, preserves creek woodlands and has regrown some tallgrass prairie and oak–hickory forest. It serves the people of the Decatur metropolitan area.

== Description ==
The Friends Creek Conservation Area land is a combination of creekside woodland and upland meadow/oak-hickory savanna. The Macon County Conservation District describes the land as a combination of "floodplain, forest, open meadows, and tall grass prairie". The conservation area houses three trails, with lengths totaling 3.5 miles (5.6 km) for active use, and centers on a 35-site primitive/non-primitive campground that borders on winding Friends Creek. Camping fees are charged, with a discount for Macon County residents.

A key historic asset of the conservation area, across a rural road from the campground, is the Bethel School, a surviving one-room schoolhouse built about 1890. It continues in use for educational field trips. The conservation area is served by Exit 156 ("Cisco") on Interstate 72. Its address is 13734 Friends Creek Park Road, Cisco, Illinois.
