= Lane, Illinois =

- Unincorporated community
- Location within Illinois Location within the United States
- Coordinates: 40°07′21″N 88°51′20″W
- Country: United States
- State: Illinois
- County: DeWitt

Area
  - Total: 0.12 sq mi (0.32 km^{2})
  - Land: 0.12 sq mi (0.32 km^{2})
  - Water: 0 sq mi (0.00 km^{2})
- Elevation: 728 ft (222 m)

Population (2020)
  - Total: 95
  - Density: 770.8/sq mi (297.62/km^{2})
- Time zone: UTC-6 (Central (CST))
  - Summer (DST): UTC-5 (CDT)
- ZIP code: 61750
- Area code: 217
- GNIS feature ID: 411799

Lane is an unincorporated community in DeWitt County, Illinois, United States. Lane is 6 miles (9.7 km) east-southeast of Clinton with ZIP code 61750. The population was 95 as of the 2020 census.

== Demographics ==
Historical population
Census	Pop.	Note	%±
2020	95		—
U.S. Decennial Census

Lane first appeared as a census designated place in the 2020 U.S. census.

As of the 2020 census there were 95 people, 49 households, and 26 families residing in the CDP. The population density was 772.36 inhabitants per square mile (298.21/km^{2}). There were 47 housing units at an average density of 382.11 per square mile (147.53/km^{2}). The racial makeup of the CDP was 100.00% White. Hispanic or Latino of any race were 0.00% of the population.

There were 49 households, out of which 53.1% had children under the age of 18 living with them, 28.57% were married couples living together, 24.49% had a female householder with no husband present, and 46.94% were non-families. 46.94% of all households were made up of individuals, and none had someone living alone who was 65 years of age or older. The average household size was 5.42 and the average family size was 3.35.

The CDP's age distribution consisted of 61.0% under the age of 18, 5.5% from 18 to 24, 33.5% from 25 to 44, 0% from 45 to 64, and none who were 65 years of age or older. The median age was 11.0 years. For every 100 females, there were 127.8 males. For every 100 females age 18 and over, there were 190.9 males.

The median income for a household in the CDP was $57,813, and the median income for a family was $43,182. Males had a median income of $57,717 versus $37,614 for females. The per capita income for the CDP was $14,357. About 3.8% of families and 3.0% of the population were below the poverty line, including 4.0% of those under age 18.
