= Birkbeck, Illinois =

- Unincorporated community
- Location within Illinois Location within the United States
- Coordinates: 40°10′37″N 88°52′06″W
- Country: United States
- State: Illinois
- County: DeWitt
- Elevation: 745 ft (227 m)
- Time zone: UTC-6 (Central (CST))
  - Summer (DST): UTC-5 (CDT)
- Area code: 217
- GNIS feature ID: 404465

Birkbeck is an unincorporated community within the Township of Harp, a minor civil division (MCD) of DeWitt County, Illinois, United States. Birkbeck is located along Illinois Route 54, 5 miles (8.0 km) east-northeast of Clinton.
