= Tunbridge Township, DeWitt County, Illinois =

Tunbridge Township
- Township
- Location in DeWitt County

- DeWitt County's location in Illinois
- Coordinates: 40°05′34″N 89°05′16″W
- Country: United States
- State: Illinois
- County: DeWitt
- Established: November 2, 1858

Area
  - Total: 37.44 sq mi (97.0 km^{2})
  - Land: 37.42 sq mi (96.9 km^{2})
  - Water: 0.02 sq mi (0.052 km^{2}) 0.06%
- Elevation: 643 ft (196 m)

Population (2020)
  - Total: 751
  - Density: 20.1/sq mi (7.75/km^{2})
- Time zone: UTC-6 (CST)
  - Summer (DST): UTC-5 (CDT)
- ZIP codes: 61727, 61749
- FIPS code: 17-039-76342
- GNIS feature ID: 429846

Tunbridge Township is one of thirteen townships in DeWitt County, Illinois, USA. As of the 2020 census, its population was 751 and it contained 338 housing units.

== Geography ==
According to the 2021 census gazetteer files, Tunbridge Township has a total area of 37.44 square miles (96.97 km^{2}), of which 37.42 square miles (96.92 km^{2}) (or 99.94%) is land and 0.02 square miles (0.05 km^{2}) (or 0.06%) is water.

=== Cities, towns, villages ===
- Kenney

=== Unincorporated towns ===
- Rowell at 40.071982°N 89.029528°W
- Tunbridge at 40.113649°N 89.048695°W

(This list is based on USGS data and may include former settlements.)

=== Cemeteries ===
The township contains these five cemeteries: Hays, Old Baptist, Pleasant Valley, Randolph and Tunbridge.

== Demographics ==
Historical population
Census	Pop.	Note	%±
1930	1,180		—
1940	1,129		−4.3%
1950	797		−29.4%
1960	951		19.3%
1970	856		−10.0%
1980	872		1.9%
1990	789		−9.5%
2000	810		2.7%
2010	760		−6.2%
2020	751		−1.2%

As of the 2020 census there were 751 people, 394 households, and 216 families residing in the township. The population density was 20.06 inhabitants per square mile (7.75/km^{2}). There were 338 housing units at an average density of 9.03 per square mile (3.49/km^{2}). The racial makeup of the township was 94.14% White, 0.27% African American, 0.27% Native American, 0.40% Asian, 0.00% Pacific Islander, 0.80% from other races, and 4.13% from two or more races. Hispanic or Latino of any race were 2.26% of the population.

There were 394 households, out of which 14.50% had children under the age of 18 living with them, 48.22% were married couples living together, 4.06% had a female householder with no spouse present, and 45.18% were non-families. 42.90% of all households were made up of individuals, and 15.50% had someone living alone who was 65 years of age or older. The average household size was 2.07 and the average family size was 2.71.

The township's age distribution consisted of 9.7% under the age of 18, 2.3% from 18 to 24, 18.8% from 25 to 44, 46.8% from 45 to 64, and 22.4% who were 65 years of age or older. The median age was 59.4 years. For every 100 females, there were 104.3 males. For every 100 females age 18 and over, there were 109.1 males.

The median income for a household in the township was $70,595, and the median income for a family was $72,222. Males had a median income of $48,250 versus $9,306 for females. The per capita income for the township was $34,794. About 1.9% of families and 4.2% of the population were below the poverty line, including 0.0% of those under age 18 and 2.7% of those age 65 or over.

== School districts ==
- Clinton Community Unit School District 15
- Maroa-Forsyth Community Unit School District 2
- Mount Pulaski Community Unit District 23

== Political districts ==
- Illinois's 15th congressional district
- State House District 87
- State Senate District 44
