= DeWitt County, Illinois =

County in Illinois, United States

- County
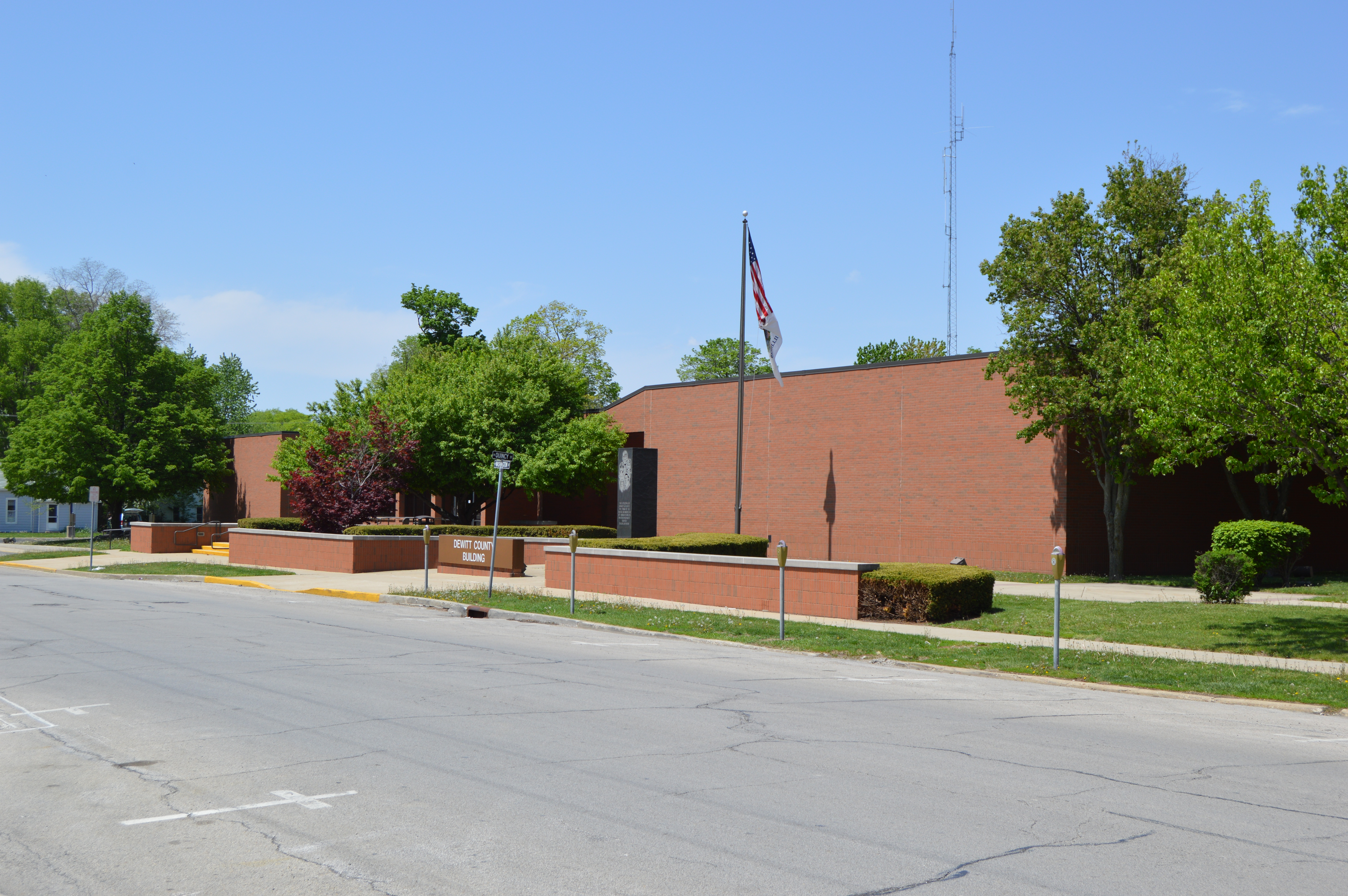
- DeWitt County Courthouse in Clinton

- Location within the U.S. state of Illinois
- Coordinates: 40°10′29″N 88°54′15″W
- Country: United States
- State: Illinois
- Founded: 1839
- Named for: DeWitt Clinton
- Seat: Clinton
- Largest city: Clinton

Area
  - Total: 405 sq mi (1,050 km^{2})
  - Land: 398 sq mi (1,030 km^{2})
  - Water: 7.6 sq mi (20 km^{2}) 1.9%

Population (2020)
  - Total: 15,516
  - Estimate (2025): 15,118 ▼
  - Density: 39.0/sq mi (15.1/km^{2})
- Time zone: UTC−6 (Central)
  - Summer (DST): UTC−5 (CDT)
- Congressional district: 15th
- Website: www.dewittcountyil.gov

DeWitt County is a county located in the U.S. state of Illinois. As of the 2020 United States census, the population was 15,516. Its county seat is Clinton. The county was formed as De Witt County on March 1, 1839, from Macon and McLean counties. The county was named in honor of the seventh Governor of New York State, De Witt Clinton.

DeWitt County is included in Bloomington–Normal, IL Metropolitan Statistical Area.

The U.S. Census Bureau and the U.S. Geological Survey (USGS) list the county's name as De Witt, although the county uses the name DeWitt (no space).

== History ==
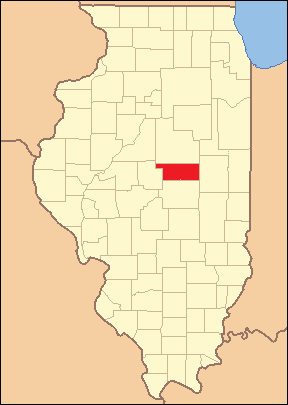
DeWitt County from its creation in 1839 to the splitting off of Piatt County in 1841

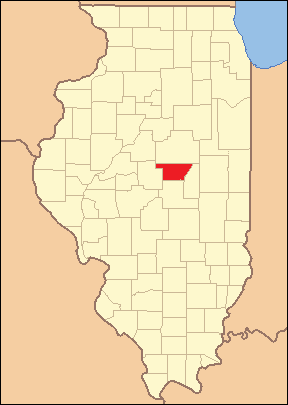
DeWitt County from 1841 to 1845

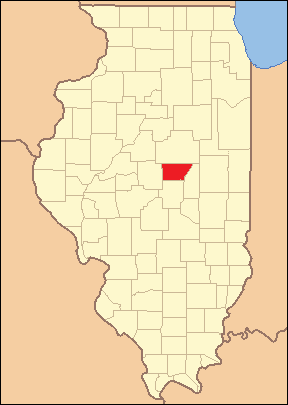
DeWitt County in 1845, when it was reduced to its current size

== Geography ==
According to the U.S. Census Bureau, the county has a total area of 405 square miles (1,050 km^{2}), of which 398 square miles (1,030 km^{2}) is land and 7.6 square miles (20 km^{2}) (1.9%) is water.

=== Climate and weather ===
Clinton, Illinois

Climate chart (precipitation, max. and min. temperature)
J	F	M	A	M	J	J	A	S	O	N	D
2.1 35 17	2 41 22	3.2 53 32	3.6 65 42	4.5 76 52	3.9 85 61	4.5 88 65	4.1 86 63	3 80 55	2.7 68 44	3.3 52 34	2.9 39 23
- █ Average max. and min. temperatures in °F
- █ Precipitation totals in inches
- Source: The Weather Channel
Metric conversion
J	F	M	A	M	J	J	A	S	O	N	D
52 2 −8	50 5 −6	81 12 0	91 18 6	114 24 11	99 29 16	115 31 18	105 30 17	76 27 13	70 20 7	84 11 1	73 4 −5
- █ Average max. and min. temperatures in °C
- █ Precipitation totals in mm

In recent years, average temperatures in the county seat of Clinton have ranged from a low of 17 °F (−8 °C) in January to a high of 88 °F (31 °C) in July, although a record low of −25 °F (−32 °C) was recorded in February 1905 and a record high of 113 °F (45 °C) was recorded in July 1954. Average monthly precipitation ranged from 1.95 inches (50 mm) in February to 4.54 inches (115 mm) in July.

=== Adjacent counties ===
- McLean County - north
- Piatt County - east
- Macon County - south
- Logan County - west

=== Transit ===
- SHOW Bus

=== Major highways ===
- I-74
- US 51
- US 150
- IL 10
- IL 48
- IL 54 – former US 54

== Demographics ==
Historical population
Census	Pop.	Note	%±
1840	3,247		—
1850	5,002		54.0%
1860	10,820		116.3%
1870	14,768		36.5%
1880	17,010		15.2%
1890	17,011		0.0%
1900	18,972		11.5%
1910	18,906		−0.3%
1920	19,252		1.8%
1930	18,598		−3.4%
1940	18,244		−1.9%
1950	16,894		−7.4%
1960	17,253		2.1%
1970	16,975		−1.6%
1980	18,108		6.7%
1990	16,516		−8.8%
2000	16,798		1.7%
2010	16,561		−1.4%
2020	15,516		−6.3%
2025 (est.)	15,118	▼	−2.6%
U.S. Decennial Census; 1790-1960 1900-1990; 1990-2000 2010

2000 census age pyramid for DeWitt County

=== 2020 census ===
De Witt County, Illinois – Racial and ethnic composition Note: the US Census treats Hispanic/Latino as an ethnic category. This table excludes Latinos from the racial categories and assigns them to a separate category. Hispanics/Latinos may be of any race.
Race / Ethnicity (NH = Non-Hispanic)	Pop 1980	Pop 1990	Pop 2000	Pop 2010	Pop 2020	% 1980	% 1990	% 2000	% 2010	% 2020
White alone (NH)	17,932	16,332	16,303	15,855	14,370	99.03%	98.89%	97.05%	95.74%	92.61%
Black or African American alone (NH)	26	25	81	82	108	0.14%	0.15%	0.48%	0.50%	0.70%
Native American or Alaska Native alone (NH)	15	36	27	23	19	0.08%	0.22%	0.16%	0.14%	0.12%
Asian alone (NH)	26	43	46	58	40	0.14%	0.26%	0.27%	0.35%	0.26%
Native Hawaiian or Pacific Islander alone (NH)	x	x	3	4	16	x	x	0.02%	0.02%	0.10%
Other race alone (NH)	3	0	16	26	16	0.02%	0.00%	0.10%	0.16%	0.10%
Mixed race or Multiracial (NH)	x	x	109	159	437	x	x	0.65%	0.96%	2.82%
Hispanic or Latino (any race)	106	80	213	354	510	0.59%	0.48%	1.27%	2.14%	3.29%
Total	18,108	16,516	16,798	16,561	15,516	100.00%	100.00%	100.00%	100.00%	100.00%

=== 2010 census ===
As of the 2010 United States census, there were 16,561 people, 6,811 households, and 4,618 families residing in the county. The population density was 41.7 inhabitants per square mile (16.1/km^{2}). There were 7,521 housing units at an average density of 18.9 per square mile (7.3/km^{2}). The racial makeup of the county was 96.8% white, 0.5% black or African American, 0.4% Asian, 0.2% American Indian, 0.9% from other races, and 1.2% from two or more races. Those of Hispanic or Latino origin made up 2.1% of the population. In terms of ancestry, 31.2% were American, 21.7% were German, 15.8% were English, and 12.3% were Irish.

Of the 6,811 households, 30.1% had children under the age of 18 living with them, 53.0% were married couples living together, 10.0% had a female householder with no husband present, 32.2% were non-families, and 27.5% of all households were made up of individuals. The average household size was 2.39 and the average family size was 2.88. The median age was 41.7 years.

The median income for a household in the county was $45,347 and the median income for a family was $56,806. Males had a median income of $41,649 versus $27,729 for females. The per capita income for the county was $24,320. About 6.4% of families and 8.6% of the population were below the poverty line, including 12.2% of those under age 18 and 6.6% of those age 65 or over.

== Communities ==
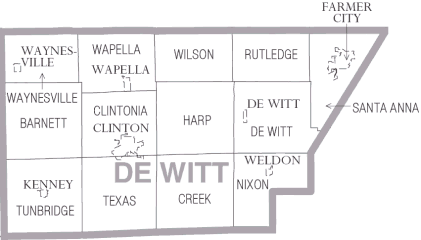
Map of DeWitt County, Illinois

=== Cities ===
- Clinton (seat)
- Farmer City

=== Villages ===
- DeWitt
- Kenney
- Wapella
- Waynesville
- Weldon

=== Townships ===
DeWitt County is divided into thirteen townships:

- Barnett
- Clintonia
- Creek
- DeWitt
- Harp
- Nixon
- Rutledge
- Santa Anna
- Texas
- Tunbridge
- Wapella
- Waynesville
- Wilson

=== Census-designated place ===
- Lane

=== Unincorporated communities ===
- Birkbeck
- Bucks
- Carle Springs
- Fullerton
- Hallsville
- Jenkins
- Lane
- Midland City
- Ospur
- Rowell
- Solomon
- Tabor
- Tunbridge
- Watkins
- Weedman

== Politics ==
DeWitt is frequently a Republican county. It has not been carried by a Democratic presidential candidate since Lyndon Johnson’s 1964 landslide, and even before that it was carried by Democrats only in strong winning elections like 1936, 1932, 1916, 1912 and 1892.

United States presidential election results for DeWitt County, Illinois
Year	Republican		Democratic		Third party(ies)	
Year	No.	%	No.	%	No.	%
1892	2,059	47.36%	2,083	47.91%	206	4.74%
1896	2,587	51.45%	2,370	47.14%	71	1.41%
1900	2,694	52.27%	2,361	45.81%	99	1.92%
1904	2,771	55.96%	1,872	37.80%	309	6.24%
1908	2,628	53.17%	2,155	43.60%	160	3.24%
1912	1,346	28.49%	1,880	39.79%	1,499	31.72%
1916	4,380	47.89%	4,460	48.76%	306	3.35%
1920	5,001	60.68%	3,079	37.36%	162	1.97%
1924	5,173	58.77%	2,752	31.27%	877	9.96%
1928	6,100	69.40%	2,631	29.93%	59	0.67%
1932	4,207	43.49%	5,339	55.19%	127	1.31%
1936	4,544	44.20%	5,676	55.21%	60	0.58%
1940	5,477	51.80%	5,052	47.78%	45	0.43%
1944	4,630	55.40%	3,658	43.77%	69	0.83%
1948	4,178	55.61%	3,290	43.79%	45	0.60%
1952	5,212	61.78%	3,221	38.18%	3	0.04%
1956	5,307	63.15%	3,093	36.80%	4	0.05%
1960	5,074	58.40%	3,607	41.51%	8	0.09%
1964	3,605	45.20%	4,371	54.80%	0	0.00%
1968	4,247	54.21%	2,823	36.04%	764	9.75%
1972	5,025	65.22%	2,672	34.68%	8	0.10%
1976	4,137	53.97%	3,477	45.36%	52	0.68%
1980	4,648	63.29%	2,262	30.80%	434	5.91%
1984	4,534	65.57%	2,352	34.01%	29	0.42%
1988	3,942	59.32%	2,660	40.03%	43	0.65%
1992	3,164	40.78%	3,009	38.78%	1,586	20.44%
1996	2,978	45.20%	2,878	43.68%	733	11.12%
2000	3,968	56.28%	2,870	40.70%	213	3.02%
2004	4,920	63.09%	2,836	36.37%	42	0.54%
2008	4,348	55.52%	3,308	42.24%	175	2.23%
2012	4,579	62.15%	2,601	35.30%	188	2.55%
2016	5,077	67.19%	1,910	25.28%	569	7.53%
2020	5,632	70.06%	2,191	27.25%	216	2.69%
2024	5,529	71.18%	2,058	26.49%	181	2.33%

== Education ==
K-12 school districts include:

- Argenta-Oreana Community Unit School District 1
- Blue Ridge Community Unit School District 18
- Clinton Community Unit School District 15
- DeLand-Weldon Community Unit School District 57
- Heyworth Community Unit School District 4
- Le Roy Community Unit School District 2
- Maroa-Forsyth Community Unit School District 2
- Monticello Community Unit School District 25
- Mount Pulaski Community Unit District 23
- Olympia Community Unit School District 16

There are also an elementary school district, Chester-East Lincoln Community Csd 61, and a secondary school district, Lincoln Community High School District 404.

== See also ==
- National Register of Historic Places listings in DeWitt County, Illinois
