= Kenney, Illinois =

Kenney
- Village
- Location of Kenney in De Witt County, Illinois.
- Coordinates: 40°05′53″N 89°05′10″W
- Country: United States
- State: Illinois
- County: DeWitt

Area
  - Total: 0.28 sq mi (0.73 km^{2})
  - Land: 0.28 sq mi (0.73 km^{2})
  - Water: 0 sq mi (0.00 km^{2})
- Elevation: 653 ft (199 m)

Population (2020)
  - Total: 311
  - Density: 1,104.0/sq mi (426.25/km^{2})
- Time zone: UTC−6 (CST)
  - Summer (DST): UTC−5 (CDT)
- ZIP code: 61749
- Area code: 217
- FIPS code: 17-39532
- GNIS feature ID: 2398339

Kenney is a village in DeWitt County, Illinois, United States. The population was 311 at the 2020 census. It was named for its founder, Moses Kenney.

== History ==
Kenney was the first community in the nation to achieve one hundred percent participation in the V-Home campaign. This distinction came in November 1942 and won Kenney national attention. The V-Home was an honor bestowed on those households which adhered to civil protection guidelines, conserved on the use of vital goods, salvaged essential resources, declined to spread rumors or promote racial intolerance, and bought war bonds.

== Geography ==
According to the 2010 census, Kenney has a total area of 0.3 square miles (0.78 km^{2}), all land.

== Demographics ==
Historical population
Census	Pop.	Note	%±
1880	419		—
1890	497		18.6%
1900	584		17.5%
1910	570		−2.4%
1920	504		−11.6%
1930	485		−3.8%
1940	483		−0.4%
1950	409		−15.3%
1960	400		−2.2%
1970	367		−8.2%
1980	443		20.7%
1990	390		−12.0%
2000	374		−4.1%
2010	326		−12.8%
2020	311		−4.6%
U.S. Decennial Census

As of the 2020 census there were 311 people, 265 households, and 103 families residing in the village. The population density was 1,102.84 inhabitants per square mile (425.81/km^{2}). There were 147 housing units at an average density of 521.28 per square mile (201.27/km^{2}). The racial makeup of the village was 91.64% White, 0.64% African American, 0.32% Native American, 0.64% Asian, 1.29% from other races, and 5.47% from two or more races. Hispanic or Latino of any race were 2.25% of the population.

There were 265 households, out of which 11.3% had children under the age of 18 living with them, 29.06% were married couples living together, 6.04% had a female householder with no husband present, and 61.13% were non-families. 61.13% of all households were made up of individuals, and 23.02% had someone living alone who was 65 years of age or older. The average household size was 2.72 and the average family size was 1.69.

The village's age distribution consisted of 10.1% under the age of 18, 4.3% from 18 to 24, 20.2% from 25 to 44, 37.5% from 45 to 64, and 28.0% who were 65 years of age or older. The median age was 60.6 years. For every 100 females, there were 117.0 males. For every 100 females age 18 and over, there were 128.4 males.

The median income for a household in the village was $60,536, and the median income for a family was $61,964. Males had a median income of $34,500 versus $9,757 for females. The per capita income for the village was $35,790. About 3.9% of families and 7.2% of the population were below the poverty line, including none of those under age 18 and 4.0% of those age 65 or over.

== Notable people ==
- Del Howard, infielder and outfielder with the Pittsburgh Pirates, Boston Beaneaters/Doves, and Chicago Cubs; member of 1907 and 1908 World Series champion Cubs
- Ivan Howard, infielder with the St Louis Browns and Cleveland Indians; brother of Del Howard

== Attractions ==
- Annually, the village holds the Kenney Fall Festival on the weekend after Labor Day, to celebrate the founding of the village by Moses Kenney.
