= Bucks, Illinois =

- Unincorporated community
- Location within Illinois Location within the United States
- Coordinates: 40°15′54″N 88°58′12″W
- Country: United States
- State: Illinois
- County: DeWitt
- Elevation: 738 ft (225 m)
- Time zone: UTC-6 (Central (CST))
  - Summer (DST): UTC-5 (CDT)
- Area code: 217
- GNIS feature ID: 422512

Bucks is an unincorporated community in DeWitt County, Illinois, United States. Bucks is 3.5 miles (5.6 km) south of Heyworth.
