= Solomon, Illinois =

- Unincorporated community
- Location within Illinois Location within the United States
- Coordinates: 40°14′56″N 88°49′22″W
- Country: United States
- State: Illinois
- County: DeWitt
- Elevation: 781 ft (238 m)
- Time zone: UTC-6 (Central (CST))
  - Summer (DST): UTC-5 (CDT)
- Area code: 217
- GNIS feature ID: 423191

Solomon is an unincorporated community in DeWitt County, Illinois, United States. Solomon is 9.5 miles (15.3 km) west of Farmer City.
