= Hickory Point Township, Macon County, Illinois =

Coordinates: 39°55′N 88°58′W

Hickory Point Township
- Township
- Location in Macon County

- Macon County's location in Illinois
- Country: United States
- State: Illinois
- County: Macon
- Settlement: November 8, 1859

Area
  - Total: 35.55 sq mi (92.1 km^{2})
  - Land: 35.55 sq mi (92.1 km^{2})
  - Water: 0 sq mi (0 km^{2}) 0%

Population (2020)
  - Total: 18,229
  - Density: 512.8/sq mi (198.0/km^{2})
- Time zone: UTC-6 (CST)
  - Summer (DST): UTC-5 (CDT)
- FIPS code: 17-115-34527
- Website: www.hickorypointwp.com

Hickory Point Township is located in Macon County, Illinois. As of the 2020 census, its population was 18,229 and it contained 8,610 housing units.

== Cities and towns ==
- Decatur (north part)
- Forsyth

== Adjacent townships ==
- Maroa Township (north)
- Friends Creek Township (northeast)
- Whitmore Township (east)
- Decatur Township (southeast and south)
- Harristown Township (southwest)
- Illini Township (west)
- Austin Township (northwest)

== Geography ==
According to the 2021 census gazetteer files, Hickory Point Township has a total area of 35.55 square miles (92.07 km^{2}), all land.

== Demographics ==
As of the 2020 census there were 18,229 people, 7,865 households, and 4,389 families residing in the township. The population density was 512.74 inhabitants per square mile (197.97/km^{2}). There were 8,610 housing units at an average density of 242.18 per square mile (93.51/km^{2}). The racial makeup of the township was 73.73% White, 14.25% African American, 0.22% Native American, 4.27% Asian, 0.02% Pacific Islander, 1.89% from other races, and 5.62% from two or more races. Hispanic or Latino of any race were 3.69% of the population.

There were 7,865 households, out of which 23.20% had children under the age of 18 living with them, 45.49% were married couples living together, 8.02% had a female householder with no spouse present, and 44.20% were non-families. 39.30% of all households were made up of individuals, and 16.90% had someone living alone who was 65 years of age or older. The average household size was 2.14 and the average family size was 2.91.

According to the 2020 American Community Survey, township's age distribution consisted of 20.2% under the age of 18, 9.8% from 18 to 24, 24.9% from 25 to 44, 24.5% from 45 to 64, and 20.7% who were 65 years of age or older. The median age was 41.2 years. For every 100 females, there were 84.1 males. For every 100 females age 18 and over, there were 79.4 males.

The median income for a household in the township was $53,911, and the median income for a family was $82,879. Males had a median income of $50,776 versus $32,719 for females. The per capita income for the township was $34,828. About 10.1% of families and 13.3% of the population were below the poverty line, including 21.6% of those under age 18 and 6.7% of those age 65 or over.

Historical population
Census	Pop.	Note	%±
2000	17,603		—
2010	18,523		5.2%
2020	18,229		−1.6%
U.S. Decennial Census
