= Weldon Springs State Park =

State park in DeWitt County, Illinois

- IUCN category V (protected landscape/seascape)
- Location within Illinois Location within the United States
- Location: DeWitt County and Piatt County, Illinois, USA
- Nearest city: Clinton, Illinois (primary unit); Monticello, Illinois (Piatt County Unit)
- Coordinates: 40°07′14″N 88°55′25″W
- Area: 550 acres (220 ha)
- Governing body: Illinois Department of Natural Resources

Weldon Springs State Park is an Illinois state park; the primary 550-acre (220 ha) area is located near Clinton, Illinois, while a secondary area is located near Monticello, Illinois. The former centers on Salt Creek and the impoundment of a tributary, Weldon Springs, to form Weldon Spring Lake, a reservoir. It is supervised by the Illinois Department of Natural Resources.

== Geology and ecology ==
Weldon Springs is an unusual spring in the relatively flat Grand Prairie of central Illinois. The spring is a local reminder of the former presence of an immense buried river valley, the Teays River, once as large as the Mississippi River. Glacial till left behind during the Ice Age buried the valley and its bedrock bluffs below the current earth surface, but much later flows of groundwater were forced by this buried geological feature to the surface. Weldon Springs became a wetland with some of the northernmost bald cypress trees in Illinois.

== History ==
In the 1800s, Weldon Springs was the fishing camp of a leading local citizen, Judge Lawrence Weldon. In 1900, Judge Weldon leased the springs to the Weldon Springs Company, which raised $7,500 to redevelop the springs as a Chautauqua. From 1901 until 1921, Weldon Springs - which was served by a branch line of the Illinois Central Railroad - was a recognized stop on the Chautauqua circuit; for ten days annually, inspirational speakers and entertainers took top billing on the spring garden's outdoor amphitheatres. National leaders who appeared at Weldon Springs included William Jennings Bryan, Helen Keller, Carrie Nation, the Rev. Billy Sunday, and President William Howard Taft.

With the increasing availability of personal motor vehicles and distribution of movies, the Chautauqua circuit collapsed in the early 1920s. The Weldon family donated the springs to the county seat of Clinton in 1936, and the parcel moved to state ownership in 1948. It is the heart of what is now Weldon Springs State Recreation Area.

== Today ==
When nearby Logan County, Illinois built its first-generation pioneer public schools in the 1860s, one of the one-room schools was named the Union School (1865). The name signifies the side Illinois took during the American Civil War at the time. After the Union School was consolidated about 1950, the building was moved to Weldon Springs and restored as the state park museum and visitor center.

From the Union School and parking lot, more than 7 miles (11 km) of trails fan out. Local hikers will find the largest trees in the Salt Creek bottoms, including the largest tree in the park, a silver maple. The 1.3-mile (2.1 km) Schoolhouse Trail accesses a restored tallgrass prairie which provides habitat for more than 30 different species of butterflies. More than 80 birdhouses are maintained to provide homes for bluebirds.

The spring-fed Weldon Spring Lake is managed for largemouth bass and channel catfish, with panfish also present. There is a power limit on the lake, with gasoline-powered motors not allowed. The campgrounds and amphitheaters used during the spring complex's Chautauqua days continue in readiness for use.

=== 2008-2009 temporary shutdown ===
Weldon Springs State Park was one of eleven state parks slated to close indefinitely on November 1, 2008, due to budget cuts by then-Illinois Governor Rod Blagojevich. After delay, which restored funding for some of the parks, a proposal to close seven state parks and a dozen state historic sites, including Weldon Springs, went ahead on November 30, 2008. After the impeachment of Illinois Governor Blagojevich, new governor Pat Quinn reopened the closed state parks in February 2009.

== Piatt County Unit / Upper Sangamon River Land and Water Reserve ==
A disjunct area of the State Park, the Piatt County Unit, comprises two parcels of land in the county of the same name, and is adjacent to Allerton Park, a portion of which is designated as a National Natural Landmark. The parcels protect 770 acres of land along 2.3 miles of the Sangamon River; the majority of this area is designated as a Land and Water Reserve by the Illinois Nature Preserves Commission. Upland and bottomland forests contain silver maples, cottonwood, sycamore, and black walnut trees. The site is open to hunting, hiking, and nature observation.
