= Argenta, Illinois =

- Village
- Location in Macon County, Illinois
- Coordinates: 39°59′08″N 88°49′11″W
- Country: United States
- State: Illinois
- County: Macon
- Township: Friends Creek

Area
  - Total: 0.65 sq mi (1.69 km^{2})
  - Land: 0.65 sq mi (1.69 km^{2})
  - Water: 0 sq mi (0.00 km^{2})
- Elevation: 682 ft (208 m)

Population (2020)
  - Total: 913
  - Density: 1,398.4/sq mi (539.93/km^{2})
- Time zone: UTC-6 (CST)
  - Summer (DST): UTC-5 (CDT)
- ZIP code: 62501
- Area codes: 217, 447
- FIPS code: 17-01972
- GNIS feature ID: 2397982
- Website: argentail.com

Argenta is a village in Macon County, Illinois, United States, whose population was 913 at the 2020 census. It is included in the Decatur, Illinois Metropolitan Statistical Area.

== Geography ==
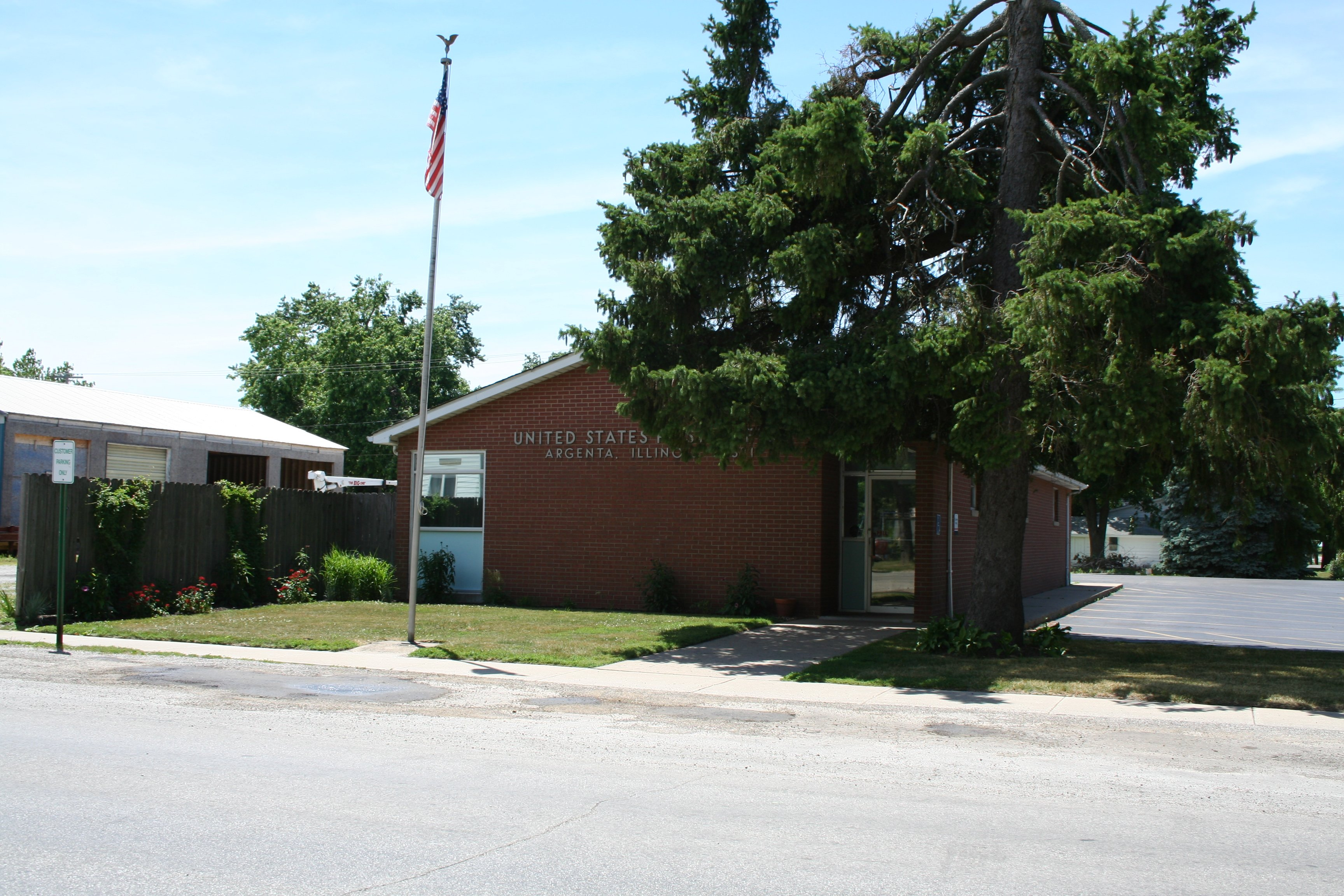
Argenta Post Office

Argenta is located in northeastern Macon County. Illinois Route 48 passes through the southeast side of the village, leading southwest 13 miles (21 km) to Decatur, the county seat, and northeast 6 miles (10 km) to Cisco. Interstate 72 passes 1 mile (1.6 km) southeast of the village, with access from Exit 150 (Argenta Road).

According to the 2021 census gazetteer files, Argenta has a total area of 0.65 square miles (1.68 km^{2}), all land. Friends Creek, a south-flowing tributary of the Sangamon River, crosses the east end of the village.

== Demographics ==
Historical population
Census	Pop.	Note	%±
1880	74		—
1900	525		—
1910	519		−1.1%
1920	528		1.7%
1930	462		−12.5%
1940	561		21.4%
1950	575		2.5%
1960	860		49.6%
1970	1,034		20.2%
1980	994		−3.9%
1990	940		−5.4%
2000	921		−2.0%
2010	947		2.8%
2020	913		−3.6%
U.S. Decennial Census

As of the 2020 census there were 913 people, 384 households, and 272 families residing in the village. The population density was 1,398.16 inhabitants per square mile (539.83/km^{2}). There were 383 housing units at an average density of 586.52 per square mile (226.46/km^{2}). The racial makeup of the village was 93.32% White, 0.22% African American, 0.22% Native American, 0.22% Asian, 0.00% Pacific Islander, 0.33% from other races, and 5.70% from two or more races. Hispanic or Latino of any race were 1.75% of the population.

There were 384 households, out of which 38.0% had children under the age of 18 living with them, 55.73% were married couples living together, 8.33% had a female householder with no husband present, and 29.17% were non-families. 25.26% of all households were made up of individuals, and 13.54% had someone living alone who was 65 years of age or older. The average household size was 3.25 and the average family size was 2.74.

The village's age distribution consisted of 26.0% under the age of 18, 8.9% from 18 to 24, 24.9% from 25 to 44, 19.9% from 45 to 64, and 20.3% who were 65 years of age or older. The median age was 37.5 years. For every 100 females, there were 100.2 males. For every 100 females age 18 and over, there were 89.8 males.

The median income for a household in the village was $61,905, and the median income for a family was $70,238. Males had a median income of $42,148 versus $32,031 for females. The per capita income for the village was $26,814. About 7.0% of families and 6.8% of the population were below the poverty line, including 12.8% of those under age 18 and 1.9% of those age 65 or over.

== Education ==
It is a part of the Argenta-Oreana Community Unit School District 1.

== Notable person ==
- Neva Gerber, silent-film actress
