= Texas Township, DeWitt County, Illinois =

Texas Township
- Township
- Location in DeWitt County

- DeWitt County's location in Illinois
- Coordinates: 40°05′42″N 88°58′35″W
- Country: United States
- State: Illinois
- County: DeWitt
- Established: November 2, 1858

Area
  - Total: 35.72 sq mi (92.5 km^{2})
  - Land: 35.65 sq mi (92.3 km^{2})
  - Water: 0.07 sq mi (0.18 km^{2}) 0.19%
- Elevation: 679 ft (207 m)

Population (2020)
  - Total: 1,266
  - Density: 35.51/sq mi (13.71/km^{2})
- Time zone: UTC-6 (CST)
  - Summer (DST): UTC-5 (CDT)
- ZIP codes: 61727, 61756
- FIPS code: 17-039-74769
- GNIS feature ID: 429831

Texas Township is one of thirteen townships in DeWitt County, Illinois, USA. As of the 2020 census, its population was 1,266 and it contained 523 housing units. The west half of Weldon Springs State Park is in this township.

== Geography ==
According to the 2021 census gazetteer files, Texas Township has a total area of 35.72 square miles (92.51 km^{2}), of which 35.65 square miles (92.33 km^{2}) (or 99.81%) is land and 0.07 square miles (0.18 km^{2}) (or 0.19%) is water.

=== Cities, towns, villages ===
- Clinton (south edge)

=== Unincorporated towns ===
- Ospur at 40.088648°N 88.955359°W

(This list is based on USGS data and may include former settlements.)

=== Cemeteries ===
The township contains Hill Cemetery and Texas Cemetery (est. 1844) near Texas Christian Church.

=== Airports and landing strips ===
- Margenthaler Airport

== Demographics ==
As of the 2020 census there were 1,266 people, 553 households, and 392 families residing in the township. The population density was 35.44 inhabitants per square mile (13.68/km^{2}). There were 523 housing units at an average density of 14.64 per square mile (5.65/km^{2}). The racial makeup of the township was 96.76% White, 0.47% African American, 0.00% Native American, 0.39% Asian, 0.00% Pacific Islander, 0.55% from other races, and 1.82% from two or more races. Hispanic or Latino of any race were 1.42% of the population.

There were 553 households, out of which 34.00% had children under the age of 18 living with them, 66.18% were married couples living together, 1.27% had a female householder with no spouse present, and 29.11% were non-families. 29.10% of all households were made up of individuals, and 11.20% had someone living alone who was 65 years of age or older. The average household size was 2.35 and the average family size was 2.90.

The township's age distribution consisted of 20.3% under the age of 18, 5.8% from 18 to 24, 20% from 25 to 44, 33.3% from 45 to 64, and 20.7% who were 65 years of age or older. The median age was 46.4 years. For every 100 females, there were 106.7 males. For every 100 females age 18 and over, there were 111.4 males.

The median income for a household in the township was $68,575, and the median income for a family was $77,500. Males had a median income of $39,324 versus $27,868 for females. The per capita income for the township was $33,894. About 0.0% of families and 3.7% of the population were below the poverty line, including 0.0% of those under age 18 and 5.6% of those age 65 or over.

Historical population
Census	Pop.	Note	%±
1930	659		—
1940	561		−14.9%
1950	498		−11.2%
1960	496		−0.4%
1970	589		18.8%
1980	1,012		71.8%
1990	1,028		1.6%
2000	1,370		33.3%
2010	1,246		−9.1%
2020	1,266		1.6%

== School districts ==
- Clinton Community Unit School District 15
- Maroa-Forsyth Community Unit School District 2

== Political districts ==
- Illinois's 15th congressional district
- State House District 87
- State Senate District 44
