= DeWitt, Illinois =

DeWitt
- Village
- Location of De Witt in De Witt County, Illinois.
- Coordinates: 40°11′05″N 88°47′07″W
- Country: United States
- State: Illinois
- County: DeWitt

Area
  - Total: 0.24 sq mi (0.61 km^{2})
  - Land: 0.24 sq mi (0.61 km^{2})
  - Water: 0 sq mi (0.00 km^{2})
- Elevation: 735 ft (224 m)

Population (2020)
  - Total: 160
  - Density: 674.6/sq mi (260.46/km^{2})
- Time zone: UTC-6 (CST)
  - Summer (DST): UTC-5 (CDT)
- ZIP code: 61735
- Area code: 217
- FIPS code: 17-19798
- GNIS feature ID: 2398697

DeWitt is a village in DeWitt County, Illinois, United States. The population was 160 at the 2020 census. The U.S. Census Bureau and the USGS list the village's name as De Witt, although the name DeWitt (no space) is used locally and by the U.S. Postal Service.

== History ==
DeWitt was originally called Marion, and under the latter name was platted in 1836. The present name is for DeWitt Clinton, governor of New York, 1817–1823.

== Geography ==
DeWitt is located just off of Rt. 54.

According to the 2021 census gazetteer files, De Witt has a total area of 0.24 square miles (0.62 km^{2}), all land.

== Demographics ==
Historical population
Census	Pop.	Note	%±
1880	293		—
1890	265		−9.6%
1900	253		−4.5%
1910	220		−13.0%
1920	263		19.5%
1930	217		−17.5%
1940	247		13.8%
1950	216		−12.6%
1960	245		13.4%
1970	199		−18.8%
1980	232		16.6%
1990	122		−47.4%
2000	188		54.1%
2010	184		−2.1%
2020	160		−13.0%
U.S. Decennial Census

As of the 2020 census there were 160 people, 85 households, and 59 families residing in the village. The population density was 675.11 inhabitants per square mile (260.66/km^{2}). There were 80 housing units at an average density of 337.55 per square mile (130.33/km^{2}). The racial makeup of the village was 96.88% White, 0.63% Asian, 0.63% from other races, and 1.88% from two or more races. Hispanic or Latino of any race were 1.25% of the population.

There were 85 households, out of which 30.6% had children under the age of 18 living with them, 61.18% were married couples living together, 3.53% had a female householder with no husband present, and 30.59% were non-families. 30.59% of all households were made up of individuals, and 15.29% had someone living alone who was 65 years of age or older. The average household size was 3.31 and the average family size was 2.60.

The village's age distribution consisted of 28.5% under the age of 18, none from 18 to 24, 14.6% from 25 to 44, 40.7% from 45 to 64, and 16.3% who were 65 years of age or older. The median age was 50.0 years. For every 100 females, there were 75.4 males. For every 100 females age 18 and over, there were 110.7 males.

The median income for a household in the village was $51,875, and the median income for a family was $59,688. Males had a median income of $54,167 versus $17,237 for females. The per capita income for the village was $23,340. About 13.6% of families and 16.3% of the population were below the poverty line, including 22.2% of those under age 18 and 8.3% of those age 65 or over.
