= Heyworth Community Unit School District 4 =

School district in Hayworth, Illinois

Address
- 308 W Cleveland St Heyworth, Illinois, 61745; United States

District information
- Type: Public
- Grades: PreK–12
- NCES District ID: 1718870

Students and staff
- Students: 793

Other information
- Website: www.husd4.org

Heyworth Community Unit School District 4 is a school district located in Heyworth, Illinois. The school district was established on March 20, 1867, as District No. 2. In 1875, a high school was added and it graduated its first class of only five students. The district number changed to District No. 16 in 1900. A new high school was built in 1921.

Benjamin F. Funk School in rural Shirley educated students in grades one through twelve until 1948 when it was absorbed into the Heyworth school district along with other country schools and was renamed District No. 4 as it is known today.
