= Wapella, Illinois =

Wapella
- Village
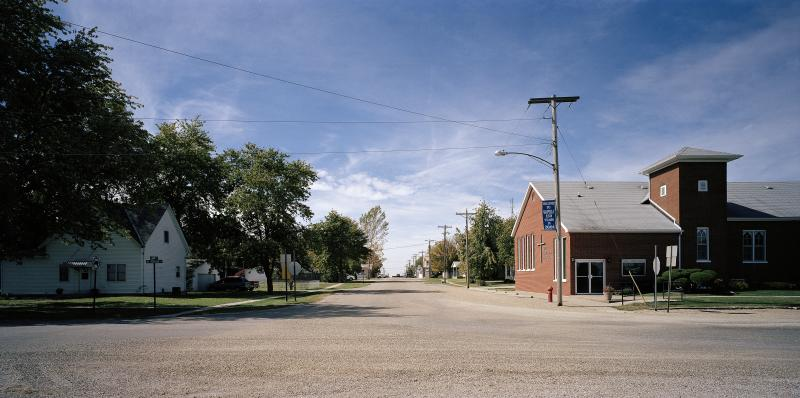
- Main Street

- Flag

- Location of Wapella in DeWitt County, Illinois.

- Location of Illinois in the United States
- Coordinates: 40°13′18″N 88°57′40″W
- Country: United States
- State: Illinois
- County: DeWitt

Area
  - Total: 0.55 sq mi (1.43 km^{2})
  - Land: 0.55 sq mi (1.43 km^{2})
  - Water: 0 sq mi (0.00 km^{2})
- Elevation: 745 ft (227 m)

Population (2020)
  - Total: 513
  - Density: 931.6/sq mi (359.71/km^{2})
- Time zone: UTC-6 (CST)
  - Summer (DST): UTC-5 (CDT)
- ZIP Code(s): 61777
- Area code: 217
- FIPS code: 17-78773
- GNIS feature ID: 2400092
- Wikimedia Commons: Wapella, Illinois
- Website: www.villageofwapella.org

Wapella is a village in DeWitt County, Illinois, United States. The population was 513 at the 2020 census.

== History ==
Wapella was founded in 1854, but settlers were arriving in Wapella as early as 1829 due to the dense timber and rich soil. The name of the village comes from Chief Wapello of the Meskwaki people. A group of settlers from Kentucky were the first Europeans to call Wapella home. A short time later a substantial group of Irish immigrants moved to Wapella to build and work on the Illinois Central Railroad. Wapella was laid out by David Augustus Neal, vice president and a surveyor of the Illinois Central Railroad Line. The village population was approximately 500 residents by the beginning of the Civil War.

== Geography ==
According to the 2021 census gazetteer files, Wapella has a total area of 0.55 square miles (1.42 km^{2}), all land.

== Demographics ==
Historical population
Census	Pop.	Note	%±
1880	369		—
1890	371		0.5%
1900	442		19.1%
1910	498		12.7%
1920	528		6.0%
1930	521		−1.3%
1940	496		−4.8%
1950	504		1.6%
1960	526		4.4%
1970	572		8.7%
1980	768		34.3%
1990	608		−20.8%
2000	651		7.1%
2010	558		−14.3%
2020	513		−8.1%
U.S. Decennial Census

As of the 2020 census there were 513 people, 210 households, and 127 families residing in the village. The population density was 931.03 inhabitants per square mile (359.47/km^{2}). There were 247 housing units at an average density of 448.28 per square mile (173.08/km^{2}). The racial makeup of the village was 95.32% White, 0.19% African American, 0.19% Asian, 0.39% Pacific Islander, 0.19% from other races, and 3.70% from two or more races. Hispanic or Latino of any race were 1.75% of the population.

There were 210 households, out of which 26.2% had children under the age of 18 living with them, 43.33% were married couples living together, 8.57% had a female householder with no husband present, and 39.52% were non-families. 35.24% of all households were made up of individuals, and 19.05% had someone living alone who was 65 years of age or older. The average household size was 2.71 and the average family size was 2.26.

The village's age distribution consisted of 18.4% under the age of 18, 9.3% from 18 to 24, 27.6% from 25 to 44, 24.5% from 45 to 64, and 20.3% who were 65 years of age or older. The median age was 43.6 years. For every 100 females, there were 86.6 males. For every 100 females age 18 and over, there were 87.9 males.

The median income for a household in the village was $60,625, and the median income for a family was $73,125. Males had a median income of $43,750 versus $19,583 for females. The per capita income for the village was $29,993. About 3.1% of families and 8.6% of the population were below the poverty line, including 0.0% of those under age 18 and 8.3% of those age 65 or over.
