= Clinton, Illinois =

- City
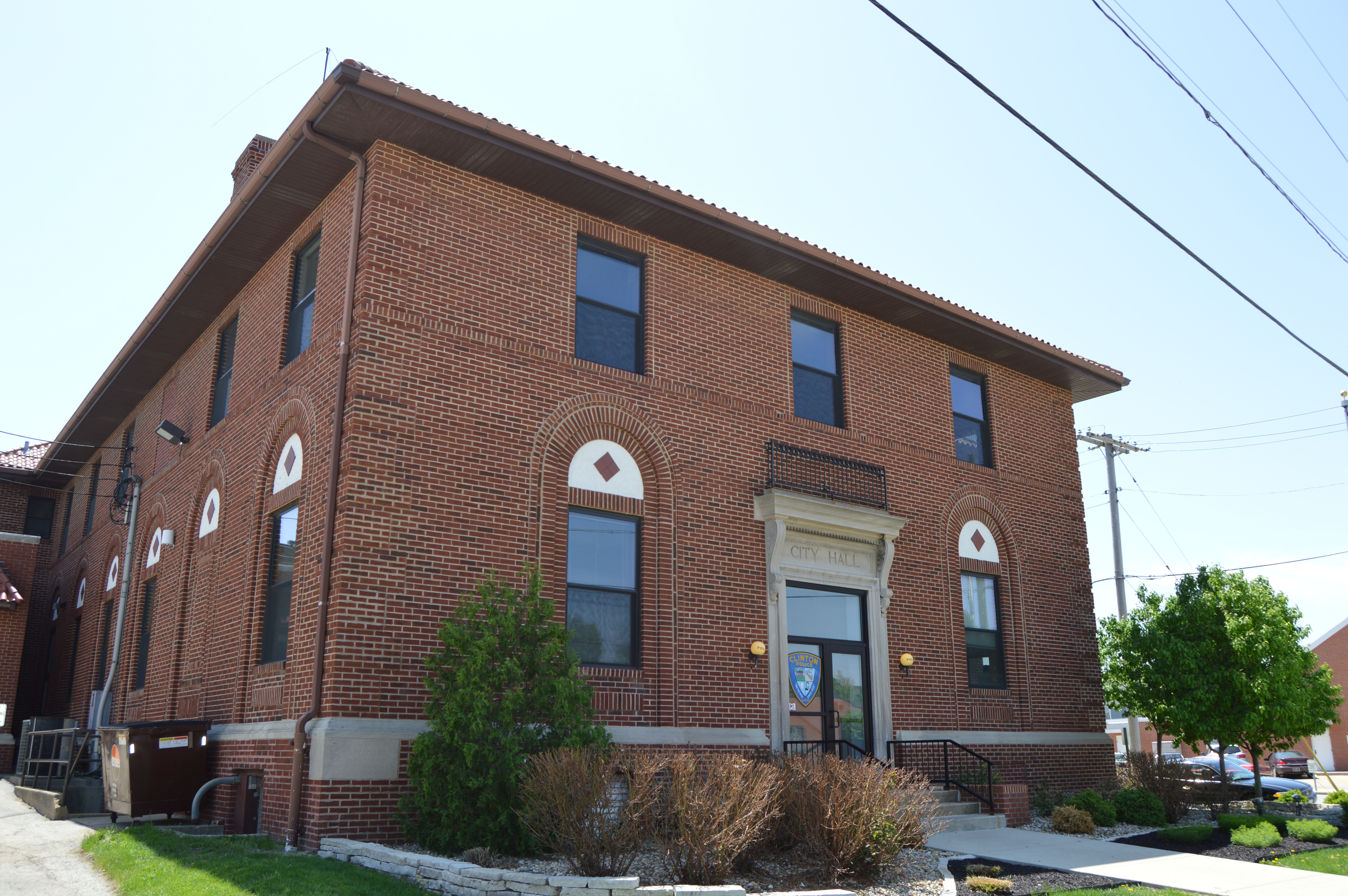
- Clinton city hall
- Motto: "On The Rise Since 1835"
- Interactive map of Clinton, Illinois
- Location within Illinois Location within the United States
- Coordinates: 40°08′49″N 88°57′47″W
- Country: United States
- State: Illinois
- County: DeWitt
- Township: Clintonia, Texas

Area
  - Total: 3.54 sq mi (9.18 km^{2})
  - Land: 3.54 sq mi (9.18 km^{2})
  - Water: 0 sq mi (0.00 km^{2})
- Elevation: 728 ft (222 m)

Population (2020)
  - Total: 7,004
  - Density: 1,976.0/sq mi (762.95/km^{2})
- Time zone: UTC-6 (CST)
  - Summer (DST): UTC-5 (CDT)
- ZIP code: 61727
- Area code(s): 217, 447
- FIPS code: 17-15001
- GNIS ID: 2393568
- Website: www.clintonillinois.com

Clinton is the largest city in and the county seat of DeWitt County, Illinois, United States. The population was 6,898 at the 2023 census.

The city and the county are named for DeWitt Clinton, governor of New York, 1817–1823. Clinton Nuclear Generating Station is located six miles away on Clinton Lake.

== History ==
The city was founded in 1835 by Jesse W. Fell of Bloomington, Illinois, a land speculator and lawyer, and James Allen, a representative in the Illinois State Legislature. The two men were on their way from Decatur, Illinois back to Bloomington after a business trip and stopped to rest their horses on the open prairie halfway between the two cities. It occurred to them that this was an ideal location for a settlement, as there was nothing else nearby. They named the town in honor of DeWitt Clinton.

Clinton is on the 8th Judicial Circuit, on which Abraham Lincoln traveled, along with Judge David Davis, for twenty years. Lincoln acted as lawyer because lawyers were scarce in the area at the time.

One of the two registered historical locations in DeWitt County, the C.H. Moore House, is located in Clinton. The house was purchased and improved by lawyer Clifton H. Moore in the 1880s, and is now the DeWitt County Museum. Moore's private library of more than 7,000 volumes was left to the city upon his death in 1901. These books would make up the first collection of the Vespasian Warner Public Library, founded by and named for Moore's son-in-law.

In 1858, Abraham Lincoln gave a speech in Clinton to which the following quotation has been attributed:

You can fool all of the people some of the time and some of the people all of the time, but you cannot fool all of the people all of the time.

on Sept. 18, according to Carl Sandburg. However, there is no official transcript of the speech. Lincoln's collected papers has a version of the speech taken from a contemporary copy in the Bloomington Pantagraph which doesn't contain it. It has also been attributed to a speech by Lincoln in Bloomington, IL two years earlier, and there is controversy over whether or not Lincoln ever said it at all.

== Geography ==
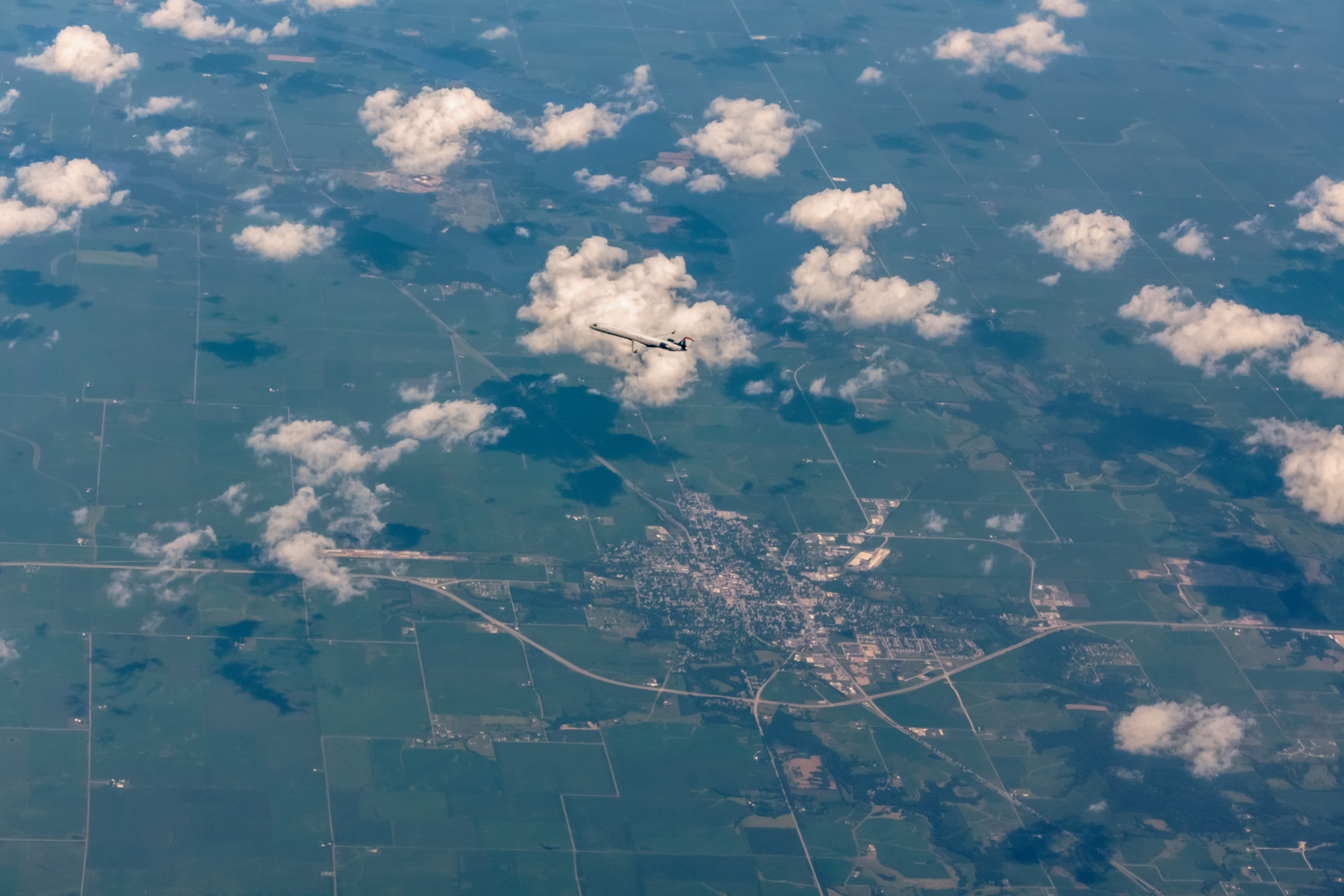
Clinton, Illinois (2015)

Clinton is centrally located in the heart of Illinois and is accessible from U.S. Route 51, Illinois Route 54, and Illinois Route 10.

According to the 2021 census gazetteer files, Clinton has a total area of 3.54 square miles (9.17 km^{2}), all land.

== Demographics ==
Historical population
Census	Pop.	Note	%±
1850	367		—
1860	1,362		271.1%
1870	1,800		32.2%
1880	2,709		50.5%
1890	2,598		−4.1%
1900	4,452		71.4%
1910	5,165		16.0%
1920	5,898		14.2%
1930	5,920		0.4%
1940	6,331		6.9%
1950	5,945		−6.1%
1960	7,355		23.7%
1970	7,581		3.1%
1980	8,014		5.7%
1990	7,437		−7.2%
2000	7,485		0.6%
2010	7,225		−3.5%
2020	7,004		−3.1%
U.S. Decennial Census

=== 2020 census ===
As of the 2020 census, Clinton had a population of 7,004. The median age was 39.7 years. 23.0% of residents were under the age of 18 and 18.6% of residents were 65 years of age or older. For every 100 females there were 92.4 males, and for every 100 females age 18 and over there were 88.5 males age 18 and over.

99.6% of residents lived in urban areas, while 0.4% lived in rural areas.

There were 3,074 households in Clinton, of which 28.2% had children under the age of 18 living in them. Of all households, 38.1% were married-couple households, 20.9% were households with a male householder and no spouse or partner present, and 32.5% were households with a female householder and no spouse or partner present. About 36.8% of all households were made up of individuals and 15.4% had someone living alone who was 65 years of age or older.

There were 3,384 housing units, of which 9.2% were vacant. The homeowner vacancy rate was 2.9% and the rental vacancy rate was 5.6%.

Racial composition as of the 2020 census
Race	Number	Percent
White	6,408	91.5%
Black or African American	74	1.1%
American Indian and Alaska Native	13	0.2%
Asian	21	0.3%
Native Hawaiian and Other Pacific Islander	11	0.2%
Some other race	182	2.6%
Two or more races	295	4.2%
Hispanic or Latino (of any race)	361	5.2%

=== Income and poverty ===
The median income for a household in the city was $46,741, and the median income for a family was $63,125. Males had a median income of $40,918 versus $26,554 for females. The per capita income for the city was $27,368. About 9.2% of families and 15.9% of the population were below the poverty line, including 25.2% of those under age 18 and 6.4% of those age 65 or over.

== Economy ==
The major employers in Clinton include the Clinton Nuclear Power Plant, Warner Hospital & Health Services and HNC Products Inc., and Liberty Village of Clinton.

== Attractions ==
=== Recreation and entertainment ===
- The annual Apple and Pork Festival draws ten times or more of the population to the city to visit, partake, and purchase items typifying the town.
- Terror on Washington Street is an annual haunted house run by Clinton's Chamber of Commerce.
- May Days is an annual festival that has carnival rides as well as live music and various other entertainment events.

=== Nature and wildlife ===
- Clinton Lake (Illinois) and Weldon Springs State Recreation Area are nearby state parks.
- There are seven small parks within the town which include facilities such as lighted tennis courts, basketball courts, baseball and softball fields, as well as other playground equipment.

=== Other attractions ===
- The C. H. Moore House is the center of the Dewitt County Museum.
- Mr. Lincoln's Square is one of the locations Abraham Lincoln delivered a campaign address.
- Dewitt County Fairgrounds

== Notable people ==
- Al Atkinson, pitcher with the Chicago Browns, Baltimore Monumentals and Philadelphia Athletics
- Keith Brendley, business leader and expert in active protection systems
- Charlie Irwin, third baseman with the Chicago Colts, Cincinnati Reds and Brooklyn Superbas
- Doc Marshall, catcher with the 1908 Chicago Cubs and physician; lived and died in Clinton
- Mike Overy, relief pitcher for the California Angels; born in Clinton
- William Querfeld, Illinois state representative, farmer, grain dealer, and farm implement dealer
- Gene Vance, a member of the 1942–43 University of Illinois basketball team known as the Whiz Kids
- Vespasian Warner, member of Congress, and later United States Commissioner of Pensions
