= 2004 United States presidential election in Illinois =

- November 2, 2004
- Turnout: 71.34% (▲2.16 pp)

Nominee	John Kerry	George W. Bush
Party	Democratic	Republican
Home state	Massachusetts	Texas
Running mate	John Edwards	Dick Cheney
Electoral vote	21	0
Popular vote	2,891,550	2,345,946
Percentage	54.82%	44.48%

Kerry
40–50%
50–60%
60–70%
70–80%
80–90%
Bush
50–60%
60–70%
70–80%
President before election
George W. Bush
Republican
Elected President
George W. Bush
Republican

The 2004 United States presidential election in Illinois took place on November 2, 2004, and was part of the 2004 United States presidential election. Voters chose 21 representatives, or electors to the Electoral College, who voted for president and vice president.

Illinois was won by Democratic nominee John Kerry by a 10.3% margin of victory. Prior to the election, all 12 news organizations considered this a state Kerry would win, or otherwise considered as a safe blue state. A reliable blue state that no Republican has won since Bush's father George H. W. Bush in 1988, Illinois voted for Democratic Senator John Kerry in 2004 with almost 55% of the vote.

Kerry's victory in Illinois was due to carrying seventy percent of the vote in the Chicago area's Cook County, where about 43% of Illinois' population resides. Excluding Cook County, President George W. Bush would have won the state 54.6% (1,749,203 votes) to 45.3% (1,452,265 votes). President Bush was victorious in Chicago's collar counties, although the results in those counties were narrower than his victories downstate.

As of the 2024 presidential election, this was the last presidential election in which a Democrat failed to carry any of Chicago's collar counties. This is the first election in which the Republican nominee has won the national popular vote without carrying Illinois (and so far the only time a Republican has done so with a majorly of the popular vote). It also marks the only occurrence in which Illinois has voted for the losing candidate in two consecutive presidential elections (after it had voted against Bush in 2000). Bush was the first Republican to ever win two terms without ever carrying the state.

== Primaries ==
The primaries and general elections coincided with those for Senate and Congress, as well as those for state offices.

=== Turnout ===
For the state-run primaries (Democratic and Republican), turnout was 25.23%, with 1,801,090 votes cast. For the general election, turnout was 70.33%, with 5,274,322 votes cast.

=== Democratic ===
The 2004 Illinois Democratic presidential primary was held on March 16 in the U.S. state of Illinois as one of the Democratic Party's statewide nomination contests ahead of the 2004 presidential election.

By the time of the Illinois primary, Kerry was seen as having all but formally secured the nomination.

2004 Illinois Democratic presidential primary
Candidate	Votes	%	Delegates
John Kerry	873,230	71.72	155
John Edwards (withdrawn)	131,966	10.84	1
Carol Moseley Braun (withdrawn)	53,249	4.37	0
Howard Dean (withdrawn)	47,343	3.89	0
Al Sharpton (withdrawn)	36,123	2.97	0
Dennis Kucinich	28,083	2.31	0
Joe Lieberman (withdrawn)	24,354	2.00	0
Wesley Clark (withdrawn)	19,304	1.59	0
Lyndon LaRouche	3,863	0.32	0
Total	1,217,515	100%	156

=== Republican ===
2004 Illinois Republican presidential primary
- March 16, 2004

73 Republican National Convention delegates (60 pledged, 13 unpledged) Pledged delegates directly-elected in vote separate from statewide presidential preference vote
Candidate	George W. Bush
Home state	Texas
Delegate count	60
Popular vote	583,575
Percentage	100%
- George W. Bush

The 2004 Illinois Republican presidential primary was held on March 16, 2004, in the U.S. state of Illinois as one of the Republican Party's state primaries ahead of the 2004 presidential election.

Incumbent president George W. Bush won the primary. Bush was running for reelection without a major opponents, and with no opponents on the ballot in Illinois.

Illinois assigned 60 directly elected delegates (the state had another 13 delegates that were not directly elected by voters). The Illinois primary was a so-called "Loophole" primary. This meant that the statewide presidential preference vote was a "beauty contest", from which no delegates would be assigned. Instead, the delegates were assigned by separate direct-votes on delegate candidates (whose proclaimed presidential preferences were listed beside their names on the ballot). These delegates were noted voted on at-large by a state vote, but rather by congressional district votes. The number of delegates each congressional district would be able to elect had been decided based upon the strength of that district's vote for the Republican nominee (Bush) in the previous 2000 election. This meant that four delegates each were elected from Illinois's 6th, 8th, 10th, 11th, 13th, 14th, 15th, 16th, 18th, and 19th congressional districts, three delegates each were elected from Illinois's 12th and 17th congressional districts, and two delegates each were elected from Illinois's 1st, 2nd, 3rd, 4th, 5th, 7th, and 9th congressional districts

Ten of the remaining delegates not directly elected by congressional district were selected at the Illinois Republican Party Convention, and were unpledged delegates. The other three would be unplugged ex-officio delegates, roles filled by the states National Committeeman, the National Committeewoman, and the chairman of the Illinois's Republican Party.

2004 Illinois Republican presidential primary
Candidate	Votes	Percentage	Delegates
George W. Bush (incumbent)	583,575	100%	60
Totals	583,575	100%	60

== Campaign ==
=== Predictions ===
There were 12 news organizations who made state-by-state predictions of the election. Here are their last predictions before election day.

Source	Ranking
D.C. Political Report	Solid D
Associated Press	Solid D
CNN	Likely D
Cook Political Report	Solid D
Newsweek	Solid D
New York Times	Solid D
Rasmussen Reports	Likely D
Research 2000	Solid D
Washington Post	Likely D
Washington Times	Solid D
Zogby International	Likely D
Washington Dispatch	Likely D

=== Polling ===
Kerry won every single pre-election poll. Out of the 12 polls taken, Kerry won 9 of them with 52% or higher. The final 3 polls averaged Kerry leading 54% to Bush with 41%.

=== Fundraising ===
Bush raised $6,892,187. Kerry raised $7,100,400.

=== Advertising and visits ===
Neither campaign advertised or visited this state during the fall election season because it was expected not to be competitive and Kerry had a solid lead in the state.

== Analysis ==
Illinois has voted for the Democratic presidential candidate in every election from 1992 on, each time by a double-digit margin. Prior to 1992, Illinois was considered a swing state with perhaps a slight Republican lean; until 2000, no Republican had won the White House without carrying Illinois, and it voted Republican in every election from 1952 to 1988 except 1960 and 1964, even voting against Jimmy Carter in his winning 1976 campaign. The blue trend in the "Land of Lincoln" in presidential elections can be largely attributed to the dramatic expansion of the Democratic margin in Cook County, which contains the city of Chicago and its inner suburbs and makes up about 41.2% of the state's population. While Democrats routinely won Cook County following the New Deal realignment except in some Republican landslide years (1952, 1956, 1972), until 1996, they did not themselves crack 60% in the county except in their own landslides of 1936 and 1964. In 1992, however, Clinton got 58.2% of the vote in Cook County, approaching 60% and a higher vote share than any nominee had received in the county since 1964, despite the election having three major participants. In 1996, Clinton got 66.8% of the vote, blowing past Franklin Roosevelt's and Lyndon Johnson's vote shares in 1936 and 1964, respectively, and Gore only improved on this in 2000. In 2004, John Kerry became the first nominee of any party to crack 70% in Cook County since Warren G. Harding in 1920, and the Democrat did not fall been below 70% in the county since until narrowly doing so in 2024.

In addition, the historically Republican "collar counties" outside Chicago began trending less strongly Republican in the Clinton years, and this continued into the Bush years. In 1996, Clinton became the first Democrat to crack 40% in the largest collar county, DuPage County, since 1964, and Gore slightly improved on Clinton's vote share in 2000, holding Bush to a 13.3% margin in a county Ford had carried by 40.5% in 1976 and George H. W. Bush, by 39.4% in 1988. In 2004, John Kerry improved on Gore's vote share in DuPage County by 2.9%, holding Bush to a single-digit margin of 9.6%--the smallest Republican margin of victory in the county since 1892 (apart from the 1912 election, when the Republican Party was divided and DuPage County voted for Theodore Roosevelt).

Outside the Chicago area, Kerry performed well in the traditionally Democratic region of Metro East, as well as in Champaign County, a moderately populated historically Republican county that has voted Democratic in every election from 1992 on. Bush had done well in most of rural Illinois in 2000, and deepened his support there in 2004. However, given the developments in massively-populated Cook and DuPage Counties, this was not enough to materially influence the result.

As of the 2024 presidential election, this is the last election in which DeKalb County, DuPage County, Kane County, Lake County, Will County, and Winnebago County voted for a Republican presidential candidate.

== Results ==
2004 United States presidential election in Illinois
Party	Candidate	Votes	Percentage	Electoral votes
Democratic	John Kerry	2,891,550	54.82%	21
Republican	George W. Bush (incumbent)	2,345,946	44.48%	0
Libertarian	Michael Badnarik	32,442	0.62%	0
Independent	Write-ins	4,384	0.08%	0
Totals		5,274,322	100.00%	21
Voter turnout (Voting age population)				56.0%

=== Results by county ===
County	John Kerry Democratic		George W. Bush Republican		Various candidates Other parties		Margin		Total votes cast
County	#	%	#	%	#	%	#	%	Total votes cast
Adams	10,511	33.39%	20,834	66.19%	132	0.42%	-10,323	-32.80%	31,477
Alexander	2,016	52.05%	1,831	47.28%	26	0.67%	185	4.78%	3,873
Bond	3,228	43.81%	4,068	55.20%	73	0.99%	-840	-11.40%	7,369
Boone	8,286	42.40%	11,132	56.97%	123	0.63%	-2,846	-14.56%	19,541
Brown	895	34.62%	1,679	64.95%	11	0.43%	-784	-30.33%	2,585
Bureau	7,961	44.47%	9,822	54.87%	119	0.66%	-1,861	-10.40%	17,902
Calhoun	1,367	50.52%	1,317	48.67%	22	0.81%	50	1.85%	2,706
Carroll	3,537	43.48%	4,534	55.73%	64	0.79%	-997	-12.26%	8,135
Cass	2,492	43.72%	3,163	55.49%	45	0.79%	-671	-11.77%	5,700
Champaign	41,524	50.37%	39,896	48.40%	1,014	1.23%	1,628	1.97%	82,434
Christian	6,112	40.03%	9,044	59.24%	111	0.73%	-2,932	-19.20%	15,267
Clark	2,877	35.93%	5,082	63.47%	48	0.60%	-2,205	-27.54%	8,007
Clay	2,101	32.06%	4,416	67.38%	37	0.56%	-2,315	-35.32%	6,554
Clinton	6,797	39.68%	10,219	59.65%	115	0.67%	-3,422	-19.98%	17,131
Coles	9,566	41.99%	13,015	57.13%	199	0.87%	-3,449	-15.14%	22,780
Cook	1,439,724	70.25%	597,405	29.15%	12,305	0.60%	842,319	41.10%	2,049,434
Crawford	3,194	34.23%	6,083	65.18%	55	0.59%	-2,889	-30.96%	9,332
Cumberland	1,862	34.38%	3,497	64.57%	57	1.05%	-1,635	-30.19%	5,416
DeKalb	19,263	47.25%	21,095	51.74%	410	1.01%	-1,832	-4.49%	40,768
DeWitt	2,836	36.37%	4,920	63.09%	42	0.54%	-2,084	-26.72%	7,798
Douglas	2,767	32.40%	5,702	66.77%	71	0.83%	-2,935	-34.37%	8,540
DuPage	180,097	44.75%	218,902	54.39%	3,447	0.86%	-38,805	-9.64%	402,446
Edgar	3,093	36.69%	5,258	62.38%	78	0.93%	-2,165	-25.69%	8,429
Edwards	930	27.65%	2,412	71.70%	22	0.65%	-1,482	-44.05%	3,364
Effingham	4,388	26.96%	11,774	72.33%	116	0.71%	-7,386	-45.37%	16,278
Fayette	3,571	37.40%	5,880	61.58%	98	1.03%	-2,309	-24.18%	9,549
Ford	1,912	29.51%	4,511	69.62%	56	0.86%	-2,599	-40.11%	6,479
Franklin	8,816	45.56%	10,388	53.68%	148	0.76%	-1,572	-8.12%	19,352
Fulton	9,080	53.30%	7,818	45.89%	137	0.80%	1,262	7.41%	17,035
Gallatin	1,573	48.78%	1,619	50.20%	33	1.02%	-46	-1.43%	3,225
Greene	2,457	40.49%	3,559	58.65%	52	0.86%	-1,102	-18.16%	6,068
Grundy	8,463	42.68%	11,198	56.47%	170	0.86%	-2,735	-13.79%	19,831
Hamilton	1,814	40.19%	2,653	58.77%	47	1.04%	-839	-18.59%	4,514
Hancock	3,975	40.16%	5,837	58.97%	87	0.88%	-1,862	-18.81%	9,899
Hardin	923	37.87%	1,501	61.59%	13	0.53%	-578	-23.72%	2,437
Henderson	2,269	54.64%	1,857	44.71%	27	0.65%	412	9.92%	4,153
Henry	11,877	47.05%	13,212	52.34%	152	0.60%	-1,335	-5.29%	25,241
Iroquois	3,832	27.70%	9,914	71.66%	89	0.64%	-6,082	-43.96%	13,835
Jackson	14,300	55.37%	11,190	43.33%	336	1.30%	3,110	12.04%	25,826
Jasper	1,781	33.38%	3,529	66.14%	26	0.49%	-1,748	-32.76%	5,336
Jefferson	6,713	39.61%	10,160	59.95%	75	0.44%	-3,447	-20.34%	16,948
Jersey	4,597	45.35%	5,435	53.62%	105	1.04%	-838	-8.27%	10,137
Jo Daviess	5,311	45.85%	6,174	53.30%	99	0.85%	-863	-7.45%	11,584
Johnson	1,813	30.91%	3,997	68.15%	55	0.94%	-2,184	-37.24%	5,865
Kane	73,813	44.12%	92,065	55.03%	1,419	0.85%	-18,252	-10.91%	167,297
Kankakee	20,003	44.42%	24,739	54.93%	294	0.65%	-4,736	-10.52%	45,036
Kendall	12,497	38.42%	19,776	60.80%	254	0.78%	-7,279	-22.38%	32,527
Knox	13,403	54.25%	11,111	44.97%	194	0.79%	2,292	9.28%	24,708
Lake	134,352	48.80%	139,081	50.52%	1,862	0.68%	-4,729	-1.72%	275,295
LaSalle	24,263	47.83%	26,101	51.45%	365	0.72%	-1,838	-3.62%	50,729
Lawrence	2,518	37.42%	4,162	61.85%	49	0.73%	-1,644	-24.43%	6,729
Lee	6,416	40.41%	9,307	58.62%	153	0.96%	-2,891	-18.21%	15,876
Livingston	5,632	35.11%	10,316	64.32%	91	0.57%	-4,684	-29.20%	16,039
Logan	4,273	31.73%	9,112	67.66%	82	0.61%	-4,839	-35.93%	13,467
Macon	23,341	45.11%	28,118	54.34%	287	0.55%	-4,777	-9.23%	51,746
Macoupin	11,193	49.12%	11,413	50.09%	179	0.79%	-220	-0.97%	22,785
Madison	63,399	51.26%	59,384	48.02%	895	0.72%	4,015	3.25%	123,678
Marion	7,694	44.67%	9,413	54.65%	117	0.68%	-1,719	-9.98%	17,224
Marshall	2,806	42.62%	3,734	56.71%	44	0.67%	-928	-14.09%	6,584
Mason	3,215	44.76%	3,907	54.39%	61	0.85%	-692	-9.63%	7,183
Massac	2,805	37.78%	4,578	61.66%	41	0.55%	-1,773	-23.88%	7,424
McDonough	7,119	47.69%	7,656	51.28%	154	1.03%	-537	-3.60%	14,929
McHenry	50,330	39.34%	76,412	59.72%	1,206	0.94%	-26,082	-20.38%	127,948
McLean	29,877	41.72%	41,276	57.63%	467	0.65%	-11,399	-15.92%	71,620
Menard	2,137	32.51%	4,408	67.05%	29	0.44%	-2,271	-34.55%	6,574
Mercer	4,512	50.28%	4,405	49.09%	57	0.64%	107	1.19%	8,974
Monroe	6,788	41.47%	9,468	57.84%	114	0.70%	-2,680	-16.37%	16,370
Montgomery	5,979	46.24%	6,851	52.99%	100	0.77%	-872	-6.74%	12,930
Morgan	5,650	37.22%	9,392	61.87%	138	0.91%	-3,742	-24.65%	15,180
Moultrie	2,388	36.93%	4,028	62.30%	50	0.77%	-1,640	-25.36%	6,466
Ogle	9,018	37.43%	14,918	61.92%	155	0.64%	-5,900	-24.49%	24,091
Peoria	41,121	49.68%	41,051	49.60%	599	0.72%	70	0.08%	82,771
Perry	4,770	45.76%	5,589	53.61%	66	0.63%	-819	-7.86%	10,425
Piatt	3,124	36.38%	5,392	62.80%	70	0.82%	-2,268	-26.42%	8,586
Pike	2,849	35.70%	5,032	63.06%	99	1.24%	-2,183	-27.36%	7,980
Pope	918	37.68%	1,500	61.58%	18	0.74%	-582	-23.89%	2,436
Pulaski	1,372	44.14%	1,720	55.34%	16	0.51%	-348	-11.20%	3,108
Putnam	1,704	50.84%	1,623	48.42%	25	0.75%	81	2.42%	3,352
Randolph	6,771	45.27%	8,076	54.00%	109	0.73%	-1,305	-8.73%	14,956
Richland	2,529	32.64%	5,153	66.50%	67	0.86%	-2,624	-33.86%	7,749
Rock Island	39,880	56.99%	29,663	42.39%	429	0.61%	10,217	14.60%	69,972
Saline	4,697	39.76%	7,057	59.73%	60	0.51%	-2,360	-19.98%	11,814
Sangamon	38,630	40.50%	55,904	58.61%	841	0.88%	-17,274	-18.11%	95,375
Schuyler	1,594	39.54%	2,403	59.61%	34	0.84%	-809	-20.07%	4,031
Scott	927	35.17%	1,696	64.34%	13	0.49%	-769	-29.17%	2,636
Shelby	3,744	35.40%	6,753	63.85%	80	0.76%	-3,009	-28.45%	10,577
St. Clair	62,410	55.14%	50,203	44.35%	576	0.51%	12,207	10.78%	113,189
Stark	1,189	38.84%	1,841	60.14%	31	1.01%	-652	-21.30%	3,061
Stephenson	8,913	41.81%	12,212	57.28%	195	0.91%	-3,299	-15.47%	21,320
Tazewell	25,814	41.41%	36,058	57.84%	466	0.75%	-10,244	-16.43%	62,338
Union	3,735	40.96%	5,333	58.48%	51	0.56%	-1,598	-17.52%	9,119
Vermilion	14,726	43.68%	18,731	55.56%	257	0.76%	-4,005	-11.88%	33,714
Wabash	1,752	29.17%	4,212	70.13%	42	0.70%	-2,460	-40.96%	6,006
Warren	3,938	46.56%	4,474	52.90%	45	0.53%	-536	-6.34%	8,457
Washington	2,986	36.85%	5,072	62.59%	46	0.57%	-2,086	-25.74%	8,104
Wayne	2,139	25.81%	6,102	73.63%	46	0.56%	-3,963	-47.82%	8,287
White	3,071	37.00%	5,180	62.40%	50	0.60%	-2,109	-25.41%	8,301
Whiteside	13,723	51.07%	12,959	48.22%	191	0.71%	764	2.84%	26,873
Will	117,172	46.94%	130,728	52.37%	1,709	0.68%	-13,556	-5.43%	249,609
Williamson	11,685	39.00%	18,086	60.37%	189	0.63%	-6,401	-21.37%	29,960
Winnebago	59,740	49.20%	60,782	50.06%	903	0.74%	-1,042	-0.86%	121,425
Woodford	6,005	31.94%	12,698	67.54%	99	0.53%	-6,693	-35.60%	18,802
Totals	2,891,550	54.82%	2,345,946	44.48%	36,826	0.70%	545,604	10.34%	5,274,322

==== Counties that flipped from Democratic to Republican ====
- Franklin (Largest city: West Frankfort)
- Gallatin (Largest city: Shawneetown)
- Henry (Largest city: Kewanee)
- LaSalle (Largest city: Ottawa)
- Macon (Largest city: Decatur)
- Macoupin (Largest city: Carlinville)
- Montgomery (Largest city: Litchfield)
- Perry (Largest city: Du Quoin)
- Pulaski (Largest city: Mounds)

=== By congressional district ===
Kerry won ten of 19 congressional districts. Both nominees won a district that elected a member of the opposite party.

District	Kerry	Bush	Representative
1st	83%	17%	Bobby Rush
2nd	84%	16%	Jesse Jackson Jr.
3rd	59%	41%	Bill Lipinski
3rd	59%	41%	Dan Lipinski
4th	79%	21%	Luis Gutierrez
5th	67%	33%	Rahm Emanuel
6th	47%	53%	Henry Hyde
7th	83%	17%	Danny K. Davis
8th	44%	56%	Phil Crane
8th	44%	56%	Melissa Bean
9th	68%	32%	Jan Schakowsky
10th	53%	47%	Mark Kirk
11th	46%	53%	Jerry Weller
12th	52%	48%	Jerry Costello
13th	45%	55%	Judy Biggert
14th	44%	55%	Dennis Hastert
15th	41%	59%	Timothy V. Johnson
16th	44%	55%	Donald Manzullo
17th	51%	48%	Lane Evans
18th	42%	58%	Ray LaHood
19th	39%	61%	John Shimkus

== Electors ==
Technically the voters of Illinois cast their ballots for electors: representatives to the Electoral College. Illinois is allocated 21 electors because it has 19 congressional districts and 2 senators. All candidates who appear on the ballot or qualify to receive write-in votes must submit a list of 21 electors, who pledge to vote for their candidate and his or her running mate. Whoever wins the majority of votes in the state is awarded all 21 electoral votes. Their chosen electors then vote for president and vice president. Although electors are pledged to their candidate and running mate, they are not obligated to vote for them. An elector who votes for someone other than his or her candidate is known as a faithless elector.

The electors of each state and the District of Columbia met on December 13, 2004, to cast their votes for president and vice president. The Electoral College itself never meets as one body. Instead the electors from each state and the District of Columbia met in their respective capitols.

The following were the members of the Electoral College from Illinois. All were pledged to and voted for Kerry and Edwards:

1. Constance A. Howard
2. Carrie Austin
3. Shirley R. Madigan
4. Tony Munoz
5. James DeLeo
6. Joan Brennan
7. Vera Davis
8. Linda Pasternak
9. William Marovitz
10. Dan Pierce
11. Debbie Halvorson
12. Molly McKenzie
13. Beth Ann May
14. Mary Lou Kearns
15. Lynn Foster
16. John Nelson
17. Mary Boland
18. Shirley McCombs
19. Jerry Sinclair
20. Barbara Flynn Currie
21. John Daley
