= Casner =

Casner is a surname. Notable people with the surname include:

- Ken Casner (1930–2009), American football player
- Lloyd Casner (1928–1965), American race car driver
- T. J. Casner (born 1994), American soccer player

== See also ==
- Casner, Illinois
