= Long Creek Township, Macon County, Illinois =

Coordinates: 39°49′N 88°49′W

Long Creek Township
- Township
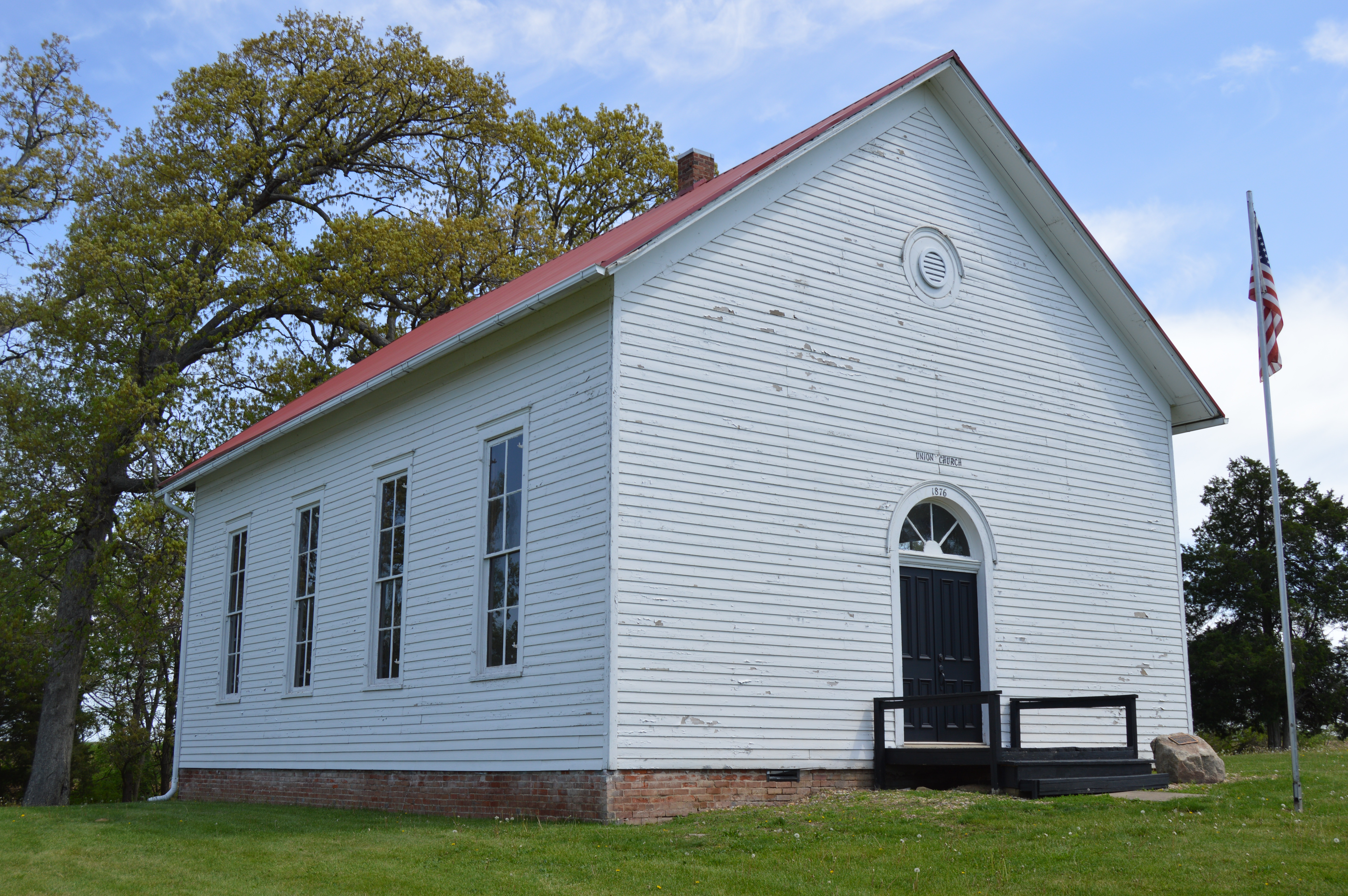
- Union Church, a historic site in the township

- Location in Macon County

- Macon County's location in Illinois
- Country: United States
- State: Illinois
- County: Macon
- Settlement: November 8, 1859

Area
  - Total: 39.00 sq mi (101.0 km^{2})
  - Land: 38.22 sq mi (99.0 km^{2})
  - Water: 0.78 sq mi (2.0 km^{2}) 2.00%

Population (2020)
  - Total: 10,552
  - Density: 276.1/sq mi (106.6/km^{2})
- Time zone: UTC-6 (CST)
  - Summer (DST): UTC-5 (CDT)
- FIPS code: 17-115-44511
- Website: longcreektownship.org

Long Creek Township is located in Macon County, Illinois. As of the 2020 census, its population was 10,552 and it contained 5,024 housing units.

== Officials ==
- Town supervisor: Kevin Greenfield.
- Town clerk: April Kostenski
- Highway commissioner: Joe Jackson.
- Water superintendent: Brad Paslay.
- Trustees: Melvin Fortner, Karen Kelly, Erin Valentine, Cheryl Horne.

== Services ==
Long creek township offers a variety of services, some of them are:

- Bridge and road construction and maintenance
- Property management
- General assistance and emergency assistance
- Snow removal
- Waterworks system
- Cemetery maintenance and sale of cemetery lots
- Community building rental
- Notary public service
- Senior citizen referral
- Monthly senior citizen luncheon

== Cities and towns ==
- Long Creek
- Casner

== Adjacent townships ==
- Oakley Township (north)
- Cerro Gordo Township, Piatt County (northeast and east)
- Dora Township, Moultrie County (southeast)
- Mount Zion Township (south)
- South Wheatland Township (southwest and west)
- Decatur Township (west and northwest)

== Geography ==
According to the 2021 census gazetteer files, Long Creek Township has a total area of 39.00 square miles (101.01 km^{2}), of which 38.22 square miles (98.99 km^{2}) (or 98.00%) is land and 0.78 square miles (2.02 km^{2}) (or 2.00%) is water.

== Demographics ==
Historical population
Census	Pop.	Note	%±
2000	10,547		—
2010	10,679		1.3%
2020	10,552		−1.2%
U.S. Decennial Census

As of the 2020 census there were 10,552 people, 4,471 households, and 2,975 families residing in the township. The population density was 270.57 inhabitants per square mile (104.47/km^{2}). There were 5,024 housing units at an average density of 128.82 per square mile (49.74/km^{2}). The racial makeup of the township was 89.27% White, 4.41% African American, 0.13% Native American, 1.32% Asian, 0.09% Pacific Islander, 0.79% from other races, and 4.00% from two or more races. Hispanic or Latino of any race were 2.10% of the population.

There were 4,471 households, out of which 21.50% had children under the age of 18 living with them, 57.77% were married couples living together, 5.48% had a female householder with no spouse present, and 33.46% were non-families. 28.10% of all households were made up of individuals, and 14.90% had someone living alone who was 65 years of age or older. The average household size was 2.24 and the average family size was 2.73.

According to the 2020 American Community Survey, township's age distribution consisted of 19.2% under the age of 18, 5.1% from 18 to 24, 18.8% from 25 to 44, 30.1% from 45 to 64, and 26.8% who were 65 years of age or older. The median age was 51.0 years. For every 100 females, there were 98.7 males. For every 100 females age 18 and over, there were 95.7 males.

The median income for a household in the township was $71,817, and the median income for a family was $85,746. Males had a median income of $60,316 versus $36,910 for females. The per capita income for the township was $44,737. About 4.7% of families and 6.4% of the population were below the poverty line, including 12.5% of those under age 18 and 2.7% of those age 65 or over.
