= Prairie Hall, Illinois =

- Unincorporated community
- Location within Illinois Location within the United States
- Coordinates: 39°45′17″N 88°47′08″W
- Country: United States
- State: Illinois
- County: Macon
- Elevation: 705 ft (215 m)
- Time zone: UTC-6 (Central (CST))
  - Summer (DST): UTC-5 (CDT)
- Area code: 217
- GNIS feature ID: 423086

Prairie Hall is an unincorporated community in Mount Zion Township, Macon County, Illinois, United States. The community is on Prairie Hall Road 4.9 miles (7.9 km) east-southeast of Mount Zion.
