= Oakley, Illinois =

- Unincorporated community
- Location within Illinois Location within the United States
- Coordinates: 39°52′34″N 88°48′21″W
- Country: United States
- State: Illinois
- County: Macon
- Established: 1856
- Founder: William H Rea
- Elevation: 682 ft (208 m)
- Time zone: UTC-6 (Central (CST))
  - Summer (DST): UTC-5 (CDT)
- Area code: 217
- GNIS feature ID: 414910

Oakley is an unincorporated community in Oakley Township, Macon County, Illinois, United States. Oakley is located along the Norfolk Southern Railway, 8 miles (13 km) east-northeast of Decatur. While now a sleepy, rural community with no commercial district, the town once featured two stores, a blacksmith shop, passenger rail station, school, church, lighted baseball field, and post office. The church and post office are still standing, but are used for residential purposes. The Oakley Township Shed serves the surrounding Oakley Township. Clarkson Grain operates a grain elevator in the village.

== History ==
The Village of Oakley was laid out in 1856 by William Rea following the laying of the first rails through the village in 1855.
