= Walker, Illinois =

- Unincorporated community
- Location within Illinois Location within the United States
- Coordinates: 39°40′35″N 89°00′24″W
- Country: United States
- State: Illinois
- County: Macon
- Elevation: 646 ft (197 m)
- Time zone: UTC-6 (Central (CST))
  - Summer (DST): UTC-5 (CDT)
- Area code: 217
- GNIS feature ID: 423279

Walker is an unincorporated community in Macon County, in the U.S. state of Illinois.

== History ==
A post office called Walker was established in 1881, and remained in operation until 1940. The community has the name of J. W. Walker.
