= Union Church (Oreana, Illinois) =

Historic church in Illinois, United States

- U.S. National Register of Historic Places
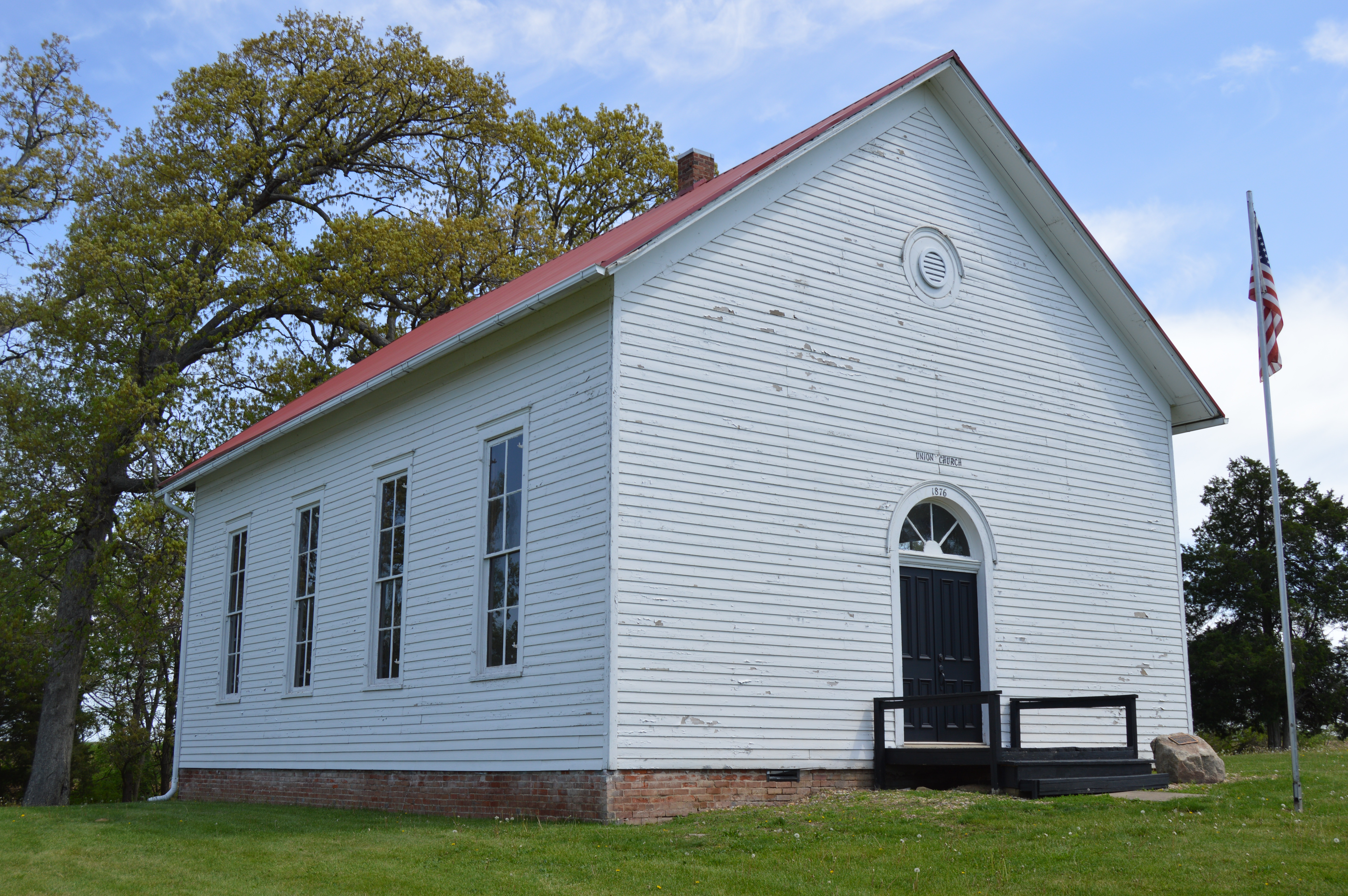
- Front and western side

- Location within Illinois Location within the United States
- Nearest city: Oreana, Illinois
- Coordinates: 39°55′13″N 88°50′52″W
- Area: 3.9 acres (1.6 ha)
- Built: 1876; 150 years ago
- Architectural style: Greek Revival, Italianate
- NRHP reference No.: 99000588
- Added to NRHP: September 23, 1999

Union Church is a historic non-denominational church located 2.5 miles (4.0 km) southeast of Oreana in Macon County, Illinois. The white frame church was built in 1876; its design incorporates elements of the Greek Revival and Italianate styles. In addition to religious services, the church also hosted a school, Temperance Union meetings, and Christmas and New Year's parties. The church has a functional pump organ from 1879, which was originally purchased for the Temperance Union. A cemetery is adjacent to the church; its first burial dates to 1842. In 1936, the church's congregation discontinued religious services; since then, the building has been used only for weddings and an annual Memorial Day celebration. The church was added to the National Register of Historic Places on September 23, 1999.
