= Emery, Illinois =

- Unincorporated community
- Location within Illinois Location within the United States
- Coordinates: 39°58′45″N 88°57′04″W
- Country: United States
- State: Illinois
- County: Macon
- Elevation: 686 ft (209 m)
- Time zone: UTC-6 (Central (CST))
  - Summer (DST): UTC-5 (CDT)
- Area code: 217
- GNIS feature ID: 422670

Emery is an unincorporated community in Macon County, in the U.S. state of Illinois.

== History ==
A post office called Emery was established in 1879, and remained in operation until 1918. The community has the name of Charles F. Emery, a pioneer settler.
