= Casner, Illinois =

- Unincorporated community
- Location within Illinois Location within the United States
- Coordinates: 39°48′01″N 88°47′28″W
- Country: United States
- State: Illinois
- County: Macon
- Elevation: 705 ft (215 m)
- Time zone: UTC-6 (Central (CST))
  - Summer (DST): UTC-5 (CDT)
- Area code: 217
- GNIS feature ID: 405685

Casner is an unincorporated community in Long Creek Township, Macon County, Illinois, United States. The community is on U.S. Route 36 3 miles (4.8 km) east-southeast of Long Creek.
