= Bulldog Crossing, Illinois =

- Unincorporated community
- Location within Illinois Location within the United States
- Coordinates: 39°47′44″N 89°00′45″W
- Country: United States
- State: Illinois
- County: Macon
- Elevation: 689 ft (210 m)
- Time zone: UTC-6 (Central (CST))
  - Summer (DST): UTC-5 (CDT)
- Area code: 217
- GNIS feature ID: 422514

Bulldog Crossing is an unincorporated community in Macon County, Illinois, United States.
