= Oakley Township, Macon County, Illinois =

Coordinates: 39°54′N 88°48′W

Oakley Township
- Township
- Location in Macon County

- Macon County's location in Illinois
- Country: United States
- State: Illinois
- County: Macon
- Settlement: November 8, 1859

Area
  - Total: 29.38 sq mi (76.1 km^{2})
  - Land: 28.73 sq mi (74.4 km^{2})
  - Water: 0.64 sq mi (1.7 km^{2}) 2.19%

Population (2020)
  - Total: 982
  - Density: 34.2/sq mi (13.2/km^{2})
- Time zone: UTC-6 (CST)
  - Summer (DST): UTC-5 (CDT)
- FIPS code: 17-115-54859

Oakley Township is located in Macon County, Illinois. As of the 2020 census, its population was 982 and it contained 466 housing units.

== History ==
Sometime around 1825 - 1830s, settlers would start to inhabit the Oakley area around the Sangamon River, first being Inhabited by Settlers James Howell and John Rea. Oakley Township would officially be established on November 8th, 1859.

Oakley Township mostly attracted settlers with its rich fertile soil for farming, producing crops such as corn, wheat, vegetables, and fruits. The first legal marriage within Oakley township was between Caleb Warfield and Nancy Rea in 1835.

== Cities and towns ==
- Oakley
- Sangamon

== Adjacent townships ==
- Whitmore Township (northwest and north)
- Willow Branch Township, Piatt County (east)
- Cerro Gordo Township, Piatt County (east and southeast)
- Long Creek Township (south and southwest)
- Decatur Township (west)

== Geography ==
According to the 2021 census gazetteer files, Oakley Township has a total area of 29.38 square miles (76.09 km^{2}), of which 28.73 square miles (74.41 km^{2}) (or 97.81%) is land and 0.64 square miles (1.66 km^{2}) (or 2.19%) is water.

== Demographics ==
As of the 2020 census there were 982 people, 385 households, and 227 families residing in the township. The population density was 33.43 inhabitants per square mile (12.91/km^{2}). There were 466 housing units at an average density of 15.86 per square mile (6.12/km^{2}). The racial makeup of the township was 96.23% White, 1.12% African American, 0.10% Native American, 0.00% Asian, 0.00% Pacific Islander, 0.51% from other races, and 2.04% from two or more races. Hispanic or Latino of any race were 1.02% of the population.

There were 385 households, out of which 15.30% had children under the age of 18 living with them, 58.96% were married couples living together, 0.00% had a female householder with no spouse present, and 41.04% were non-families. 37.70% of all households were made up of individuals, and 17.40% had someone living alone who was 65 years of age or older. The average household size was 1.85 and the average family size was 2.39.

According to the 2020 American Community Survey, township's age distribution consisted of 8.5% under the age of 18, 5.0% from 18 to 24, 10.2% from 25 to 44, 47.4% from 45 to 64, and 28.9% who were 65 years of age or older. The median age was 59.4 years. For every 100 females, there were 108.1 males. For every 100 females age 18 and over, there were 110.1 males.

The median income for a household in the township was $78,194, and the median income for a family was $107,604. Males had a median income of $65,000 versus $34,167 for females. The per capita income for the township was $50,046. About 0.0% of families and 3.9% of the population were below the poverty line, including 0.0% of those under age 18 and 13.6% of those age 65 or over.

Historical population
Census	Pop.	Note	%±
2000	1,177		—
2010	1,082		−8.1%
2020	982		−9.2%
