= Macon County, Illinois =

County in Illinois, United States

- County
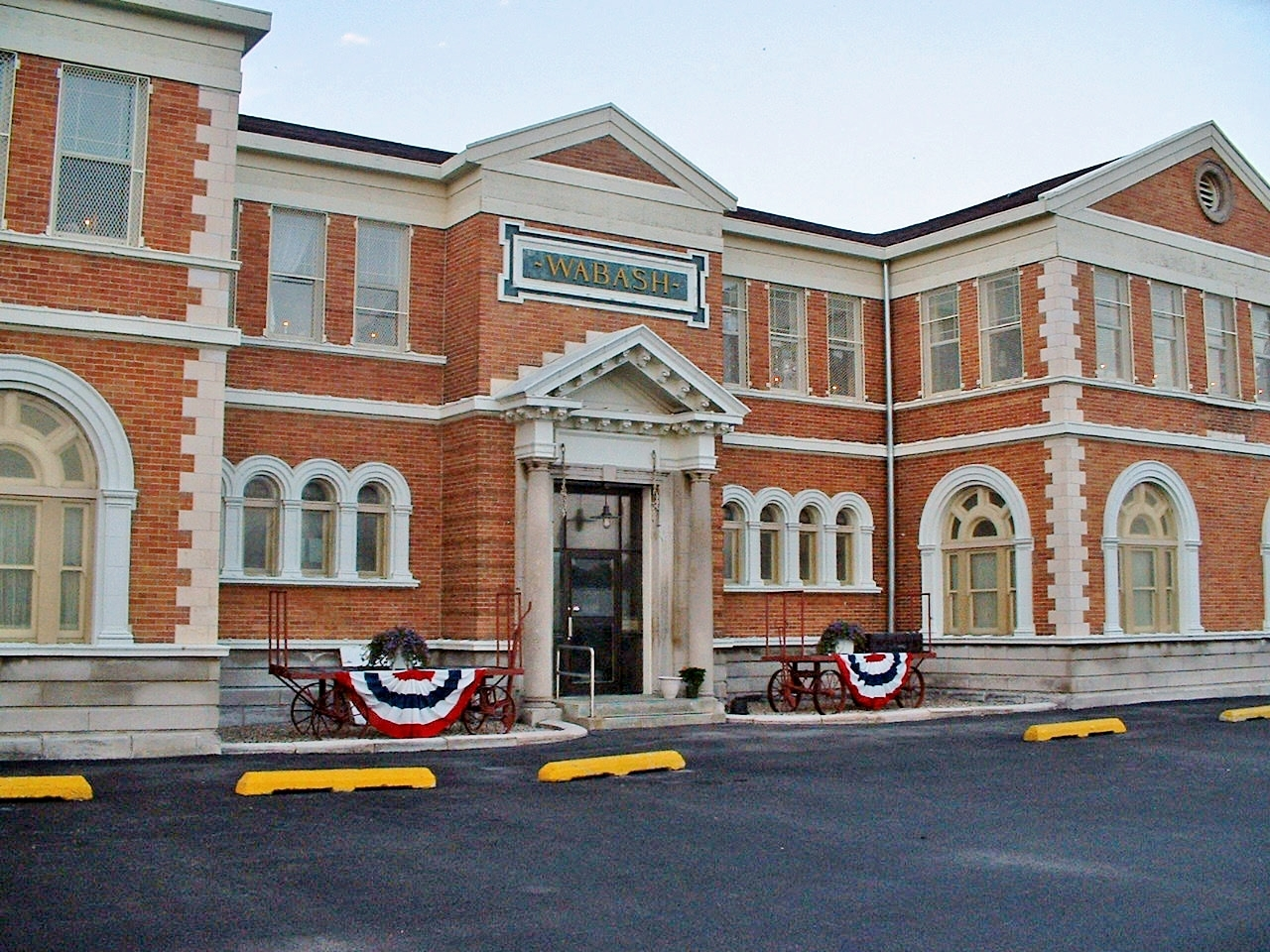
- Wabash Railroad Station and Railway Express Agency in Decatur

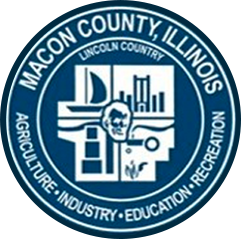
- Seal

- Location within the U.S. state of Illinois
- Coordinates: 39.86°N 88.96°W
- Country: United States
- State: Illinois
- Founded: January 19, 1829
- Named for: Nathaniel Macon
- Seat: Decatur
- Largest city: Decatur

Government
  - County Board Chairperson: Kevin Greenfield

Area
  - Total: 586 sq mi (1,520 km^{2})
  - Land: 581 sq mi (1,500 km^{2})
  - Water: 5.2 sq mi (13 km^{2}) 0.9%

Population (2020)
  - Total: 103,998
  - Estimate (2025): 99,300 ▼
  - Density: 179/sq mi (69.1/km^{2})
- Time zone: UTC−6 (Central)
  - Summer (DST): UTC−5 (CDT)
- Congressional districts: 13th, 15th
- Website: maconcounty.illinois.gov

Macon County is a county located in the U.S. state of Illinois. According to the 2020 United States census, it had a population of 103,998. Its county seat and most populous city is Decatur.

Macon County comprises the Decatur, IL Metropolitan Statistical Area.

== History ==
Macon County was formed on January 19, 1829, out of Shelby County. It was named for Nathaniel Macon, a Colonel in the Revolutionary War. Macon later served as senator from North Carolina until his resignation in 1828. In 1830, future US President Abraham Lincoln and his family moved to Macon County.

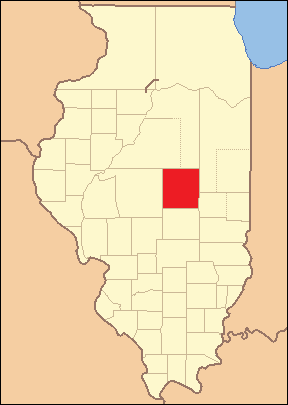
Macon County (1829)

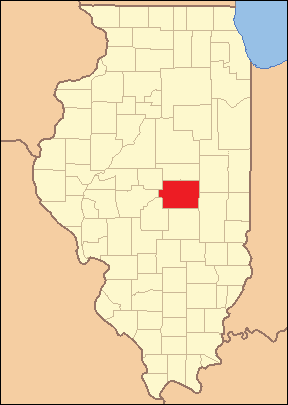
Macon County (1829–1841)

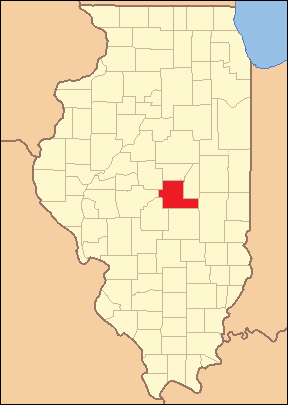
Macon County (1841–1843)

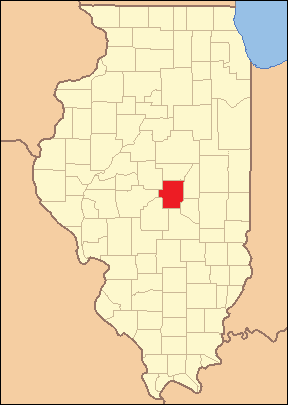
Macon County (1843–present)

== Geography ==
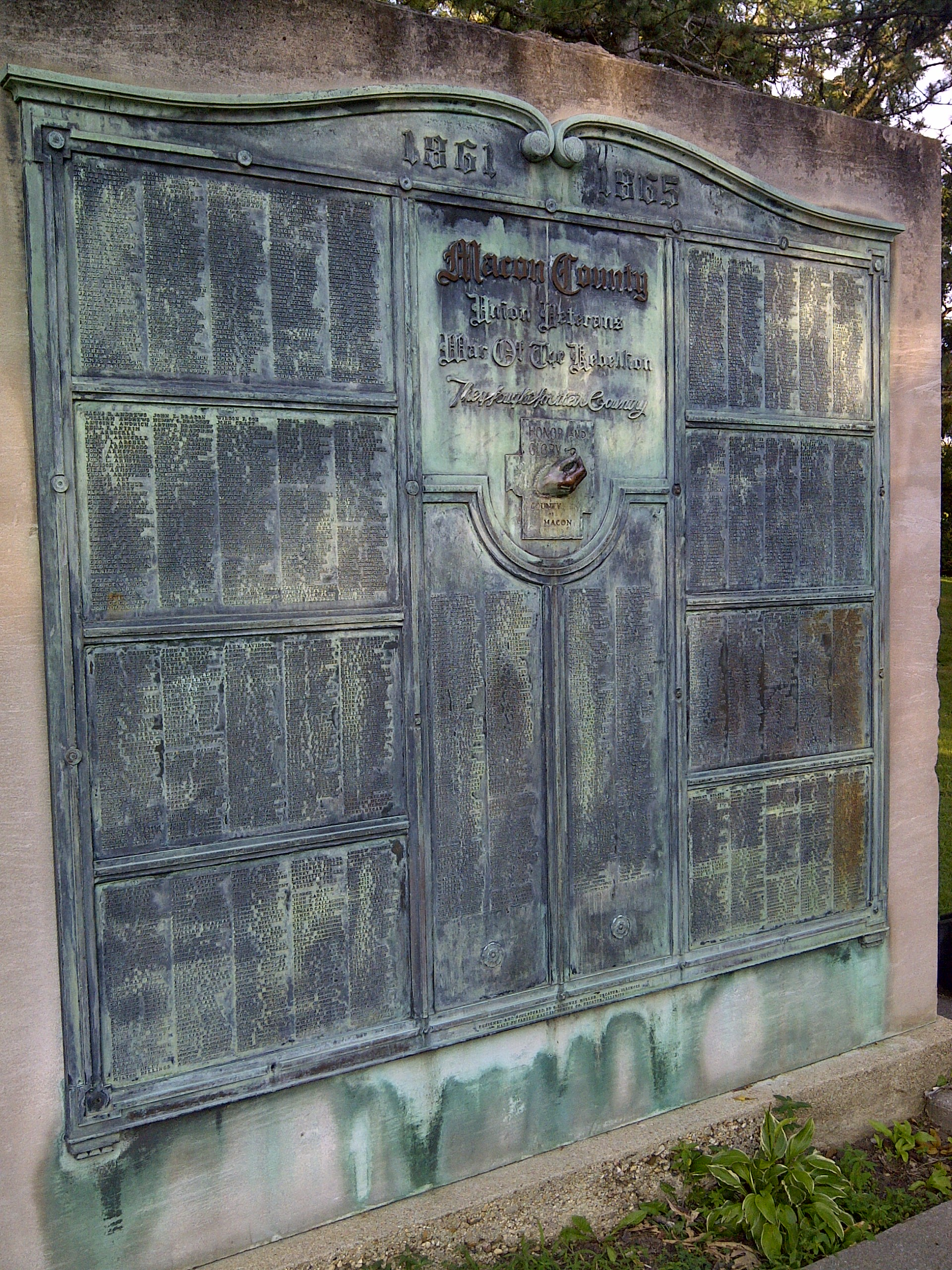
Plaque honoring 2,486 Macon County soldiers that fought in the War of the Rebellion, 1861-65

According to the US Census Bureau, the county has a total area of 586 square miles (1,520 km^{2}), of which 581 square miles (1,500 km^{2}) is land and 5.2 square miles (13 km^{2}) (0.9%) is water.

Macon County is primarily flat, as is most of the state and all of the surrounding counties, the result of geological activity during the Pleistocene epoch. During the Illinoian Stage of the Pleistocene, the Laurentide Ice Sheet covered about 85 percent of Illinois, including the Macon County area. The subsequent thaw of the region and retreat of the ice sheet left central Illinois with its present characteristic flat topography.

Because of its central location, Macon County is often referred to as "The Heart of Illinois."

=== Climate and weather ===
Decatur, Illinois

Climate chart (precipitation, max. and min. temperature)
J	F	M	A	M	J	J	A	S	O	N	D
2.1 35 17	2 41 22	3.2 53 32	3.6 65 42	4.5 76 52	3.9 85 61	4.5 88 65	4.1 86 63	3 80 55	2.7 68 44	3.3 52 34	2.9 39 23
- █ Average max. and min. temperatures in °F
- █ Precipitation totals in inches
- Source: The Weather Channel
Metric conversion
J	F	M	A	M	J	J	A	S	O	N	D
52 2 −8	50 5 −6	81 12 0	91 18 6	114 24 11	99 29 16	115 31 18	105 30 17	76 27 13	70 20 7	84 11 1	73 4 −5
- █ Average max. and min. temperatures in °C
- █ Precipitation totals in mm

In recent years, average temperatures in the county seat of Decatur have ranged from a low of 17 °F (−8 °C) in January to a high of 88 °F (31 °C) in July, although a record low of −25 °F (−32 °C) was recorded in February 1905 and a record high of 113 °F (45 °C) was recorded in July 1954. Average monthly precipitation ranged from 1.95 inches (50 mm) in February to 4.54 inches (115 mm) in July.

=== Major highways ===
- Interstate 72
- U.S. Route 36
- U.S. Route 51
- Illinois Route 48
- Illinois Route 105
- Illinois Route 121
- Illinois Route 128

=== Transit ===
- Decatur Public Transit System
- SHOW Bus
- Decatur Moves
- List of intercity bus stops in Illinois

=== Adjacent counties ===
- De Witt - north
- Piatt - northeast
- Moultrie - southeast
- Shelby - south
- Christian - southwest
- Sangamon - west
- Logan - northwest

== Demographics ==
Historical population
Census	Pop.	Note	%±
1830	1,122		—
1840	3,039		170.9%
1850	3,988		31.2%
1860	13,738		244.5%
1870	26,481		92.8%
1880	30,665		15.8%
1890	38,083		24.2%
1900	44,003		15.5%
1910	54,186		23.1%
1920	65,175		20.3%
1930	81,731		25.4%
1940	84,693		3.6%
1950	98,853		16.7%
1960	118,257		19.6%
1970	125,010		5.7%
1980	131,375		5.1%
1990	117,206		−10.8%
2000	114,706		−2.1%
2010	110,768		−3.4%
2020	103,998		−6.1%
2025 (est.)	99,300	▼	−4.5%
US Decennial Census; 1790–1960 1900–1990; 1990–2000 2010

=== 2020 census ===
As of the 2020 census, the county had a population of 103,998. The median age was 41.3 years. 22.1% of residents were under the age of 18 and 20.5% of residents were 65 years of age or older. For every 100 females there were 92.6 males, and for every 100 females age 18 and over there were 89.3 males age 18 and over.

The racial makeup of the county as reported by the 2020 census was 72.9% White, 18.3% Black or African American, 0.2% American Indian and Alaska Native, 1.5% Asian, <0.1% Native Hawaiian and Pacific Islander, 1.2% from some other race, and 5.9% from two or more races. Hispanic or Latino residents of any race comprised 2.6% of the population.

The 2020 census also reported that 83.0% of residents lived in urban areas while 17.0% lived in rural areas.

There were 44,549 households in the county, of which 26.8% had children under the age of 18 living in them. Of all households, 40.6% were married-couple households, 20.2% were households with a male householder and no spouse or partner present, and 31.8% were households with a female householder and no spouse or partner present. About 33.8% of all households were made up of individuals and 14.2% had someone living alone who was 65 years of age or older.

There were 49,727 housing units, of which 10.4% were vacant. Among occupied housing units, 66.9% were owner-occupied and 33.1% were renter-occupied. The homeowner vacancy rate was 2.3% and the rental vacancy rate was 10.6%.

=== Racial and ethnic composition ===
Macon County, Illinois – Racial and ethnic composition Note: the US Census treats Hispanic/Latino as an ethnic category. This table excludes Latinos from the racial categories and assigns them to a separate category. Hispanics/Latinos may be of any race.
Race / Ethnicity (NH = Non-Hispanic)	Pop 1980	Pop 1990	Pop 2000	Pop 2010	Pop 2020	% 1980	% 1990	% 2000	% 2010	% 2020
White alone (NH)	116,269	101,838	95,128	86,822	75,117	88.50%	86.89%	82.93%	78.38%	72.23%
Black or African American alone (NH)	13,631	14,095	16,036	17,916	18,886	10.38%	12.03%	13.98%	16.17%	18.16%
Native American or Alaska Native alone (NH)	180	150	180	199	178	0.14%	0.13%	0.16%	0.18%	0.17%
Asian alone (NH)	363	502	649	1,107	1,512	0.28%	0.43%	0.57%	1.00%	1.45%
Native Hawaiian or Pacific Islander alone (NH)	x	x	19	26	31	x	x	0.02%	0.02%	0.03%
Other race alone (NH)	187	81	117	145	415	0.14%	0.07%	0.10%	0.13%	0.40%
Mixed race or Multiracial (NH)	x	x	1,457	2,481	5,126	x	x	1.27%	2.24%	4.93%
Hispanic or Latino (any race)	745	540	1,120	2,072	2,733	0.57%	0.46%	0.98%	1.87%	2.63%
Total	131,375	117,206	114,706	110,768	103,998	100.00%	100.00%	100.00%	100.00%	100.00%

=== 2010 census ===
As of the 2010 United States census, there were 110,768 people, 45,855 households, and 29,326 families residing in the county. The population density was 190.8 inhabitants per square mile (73.7/km^{2}). There were 50,475 housing units at an average density of 86.9 per square mile (33.6/km^{2}). The racial makeup of the county was 79.3% white, 16.3% black or African American, 1.0% Asian, 0.2% American Indian, 0.7% from other races, and 2.5% from two or more races. Those of Hispanic or Latino origin made up 1.9% of the population. In terms of ancestry, 21.7% were German, 17.0% were American, 12.9% were Irish, and 10.8% were English.

Of the 45,855 households, 29.5% had children under the age of 18 living with them, 45.7% were married couples living together, 14.1% had a female householder with no husband present, 36.0% were non-families, and 30.9% of all households were made up of individuals. The average household size was 2.33 and the average family size was 2.89. The median age was 40.3 years.

The median income for a household in the county was $44,337 and the median income for a family was $57,570. Males had a median income of $48,570 versus $31,568 for females. The per capita income for the county was $24,726. About 10.3% of families and 15.7% of the population were below the poverty line, including 26.1% of those under age 18 and 6.5% of those age 65 or over.

== Communities ==
=== Cities ===
- Decatur (county seat and largest municipality)
- Macon
- Maroa

=== Villages ===
- Argenta
- Blue Mound
- Forsyth
- Harristown
- Long Creek
- Mount Zion
- Niantic
- Oreana
- Warrensburg

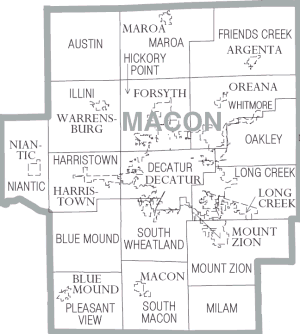
Map of Macon County

=== Census-designated place ===
- Boody
- Elwin

=== Unincorporated communities ===
- Bearsdale
- Blackland
- Bulldog Crossing
- Casner
- Emery
- Heman
- Hervey City
- Newburg
- Oakley
- Prairie Hall
- Sangamon
- Walker

=== Ghost Town ===
- Whistleville

=== Townships ===
- Austin
- Blue Mound
- Decatur
- Friends Creek
- Harristown
- Hickory Point
- Illini
- Long Creek
- Maroa
- Milam (defunct)
- Mount Zion
- Niantic
- Oakley
- Pleasant View
- South Macon
- South Wheatland
- Whitmore

== Politics ==
In its early years Macon County favored the Democratic Party, voting for it in every election through 1860. Republican Abraham Lincoln won the county in the 1864 election, and from then until the Great Depression Macon County became solidly Republican, only giving a narrow plurality to Woodrow Wilson in 1912 when the GOP was divided by Theodore Roosevelt's splinter–party run.

The FDR-era New Deal saw the county become more amenable to the Democratic Party again due to its strong industrial base. Macon County voted for the winner in every election from 1920 through 1996 save in 1960, 1968, and 1988, in two of which it voted for a losing Democrat over a winning Republican (Humphrey over Nixon in 1968 and Dukakis over George H. W. Bush in 1988). In 2000, Macon voted for a losing Democrat for the third time since the New Deal, as Al Gore narrowly held the county, but since then the county has once again trended Republican, as George W. Bush carried the county over John Kerry in 2004 with the same vote share as Reagan in his 1984 national landslide. Illinois native Barack Obama did carry the county with a plurality in his sweeping 2008 triumph, but lost the county to Mitt Romney in 2012. In 2016, Hillary Clinton got the lowest vote share of any Democrat since George McGovern; and while Joe Biden improved on her vote share in 2020, he still failed to match McGovern's percentage.

United States presidential election results for Macon County, Illinois
Year	Republican		Democratic		Third party(ies)	
Year	No.	%	No.	%	No.	%
1892	4,575	48.04%	4,303	45.18%	646	6.78%
1896	6,216	55.73%	4,756	42.64%	182	1.63%
1900	6,086	54.26%	4,874	43.46%	256	2.28%
1904	6,284	62.79%	2,952	29.50%	772	7.71%
1908	6,643	55.98%	4,615	38.89%	608	5.12%
1912	3,356	27.33%	4,435	36.12%	4,487	36.55%
1916	13,997	52.90%	11,181	42.25%	1,283	4.85%
1920	16,486	65.27%	7,917	31.35%	854	3.38%
1924	16,458	60.22%	6,670	24.40%	4,203	15.38%
1928	24,492	70.68%	9,932	28.66%	230	0.66%
1932	16,868	42.87%	21,638	54.99%	840	2.13%
1936	15,585	35.84%	27,360	62.92%	541	1.24%
1940	19,998	41.78%	27,589	57.64%	277	0.58%
1944	19,608	46.06%	22,808	53.58%	153	0.36%
1948	18,719	46.27%	21,487	53.11%	250	0.62%
1952	25,744	53.56%	22,277	46.35%	45	0.09%
1956	27,673	54.51%	23,066	45.43%	32	0.06%
1960	27,151	50.95%	26,029	48.85%	108	0.20%
1964	17,957	33.88%	35,045	66.12%	0	0.00%
1968	21,027	42.27%	23,369	46.98%	5,345	10.75%
1972	29,596	59.16%	20,296	40.57%	137	0.27%
1976	24,893	46.44%	28,243	52.69%	463	0.86%
1980	28,298	52.45%	22,325	41.38%	3,333	6.18%
1984	30,457	54.28%	25,463	45.38%	192	0.34%
1988	23,862	48.22%	25,364	51.25%	263	0.53%
1992	18,684	33.62%	27,449	49.39%	9,447	17.00%
1996	18,161	38.45%	24,256	51.35%	4,818	10.20%
2000	23,830	48.14%	24,262	49.02%	1,407	2.84%
2004	28,118	54.34%	23,341	45.11%	287	0.55%
2008	24,948	48.55%	25,487	49.60%	954	1.86%
2012	25,309	51.62%	22,780	46.46%	941	1.92%
2016	26,866	55.90%	18,343	38.17%	2,851	5.93%
2020	28,589	57.72%	19,847	40.07%	1,098	2.22%
2024	26,562	58.37%	18,009	39.57%	938	2.06%

== Education ==
School districts include:

- Argenta-Oreana Community Unit School District 1
- Central A & M Community Unit School District 21
- Cerro Gordo Community Unit School District 100
- Clinton Community Unit School District 15
- Decatur School District 61
- Maroa-Forsyth Community Unit School District 2
- Meridian Community Unit School District 15
- Mount Pulaski Community Unit District 23
- Mount Zion Community Unit School District 3
- Okaw Valley Community Unit School District 302
- Sangamon Valley Community Unit School District 9
- Warrensburg-Latham Community Unit District 11

== See also ==
- National Register of Historic Places listings in Macon County, Illinois
