= 1912 United States presidential election in Illinois =

- November 5, 1912

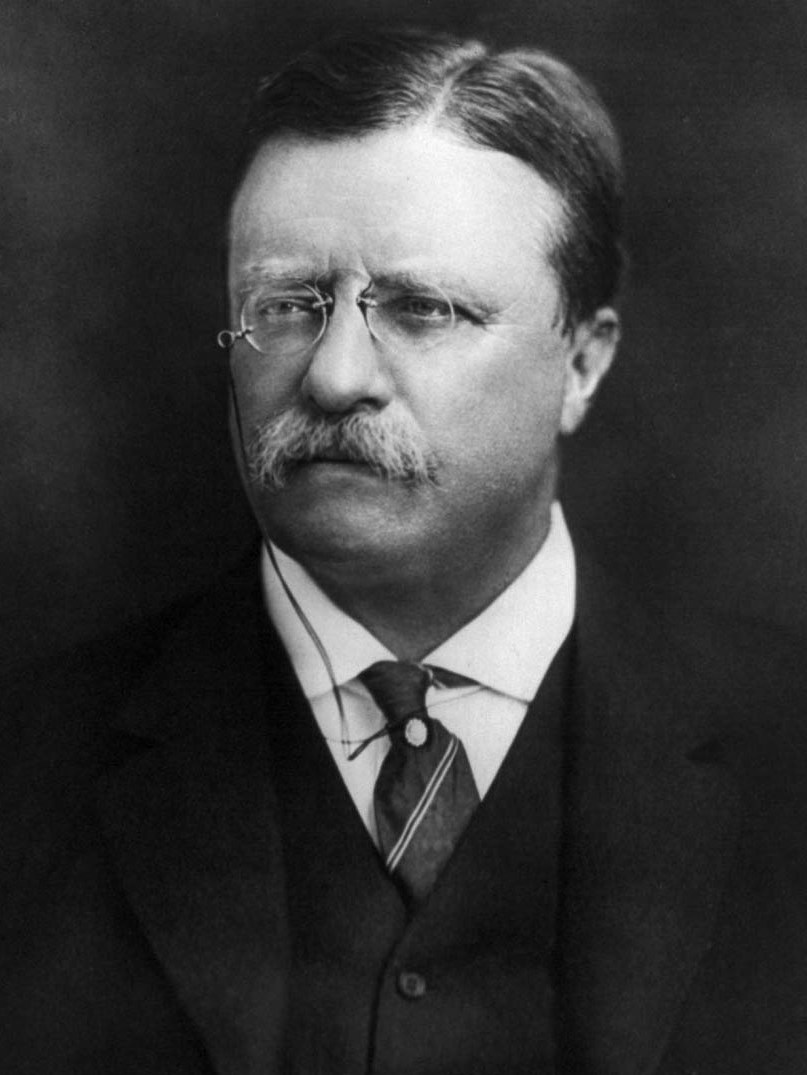

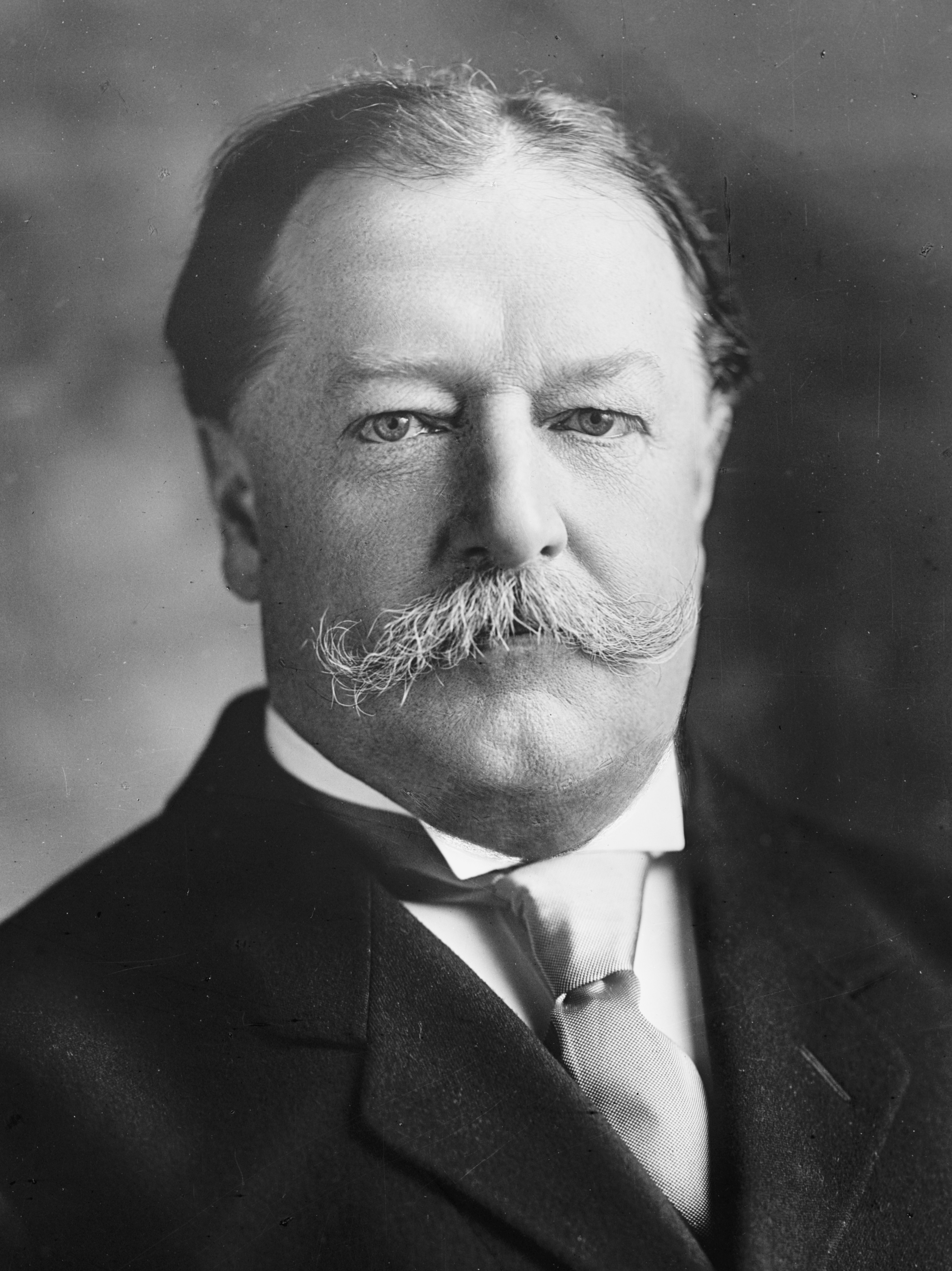

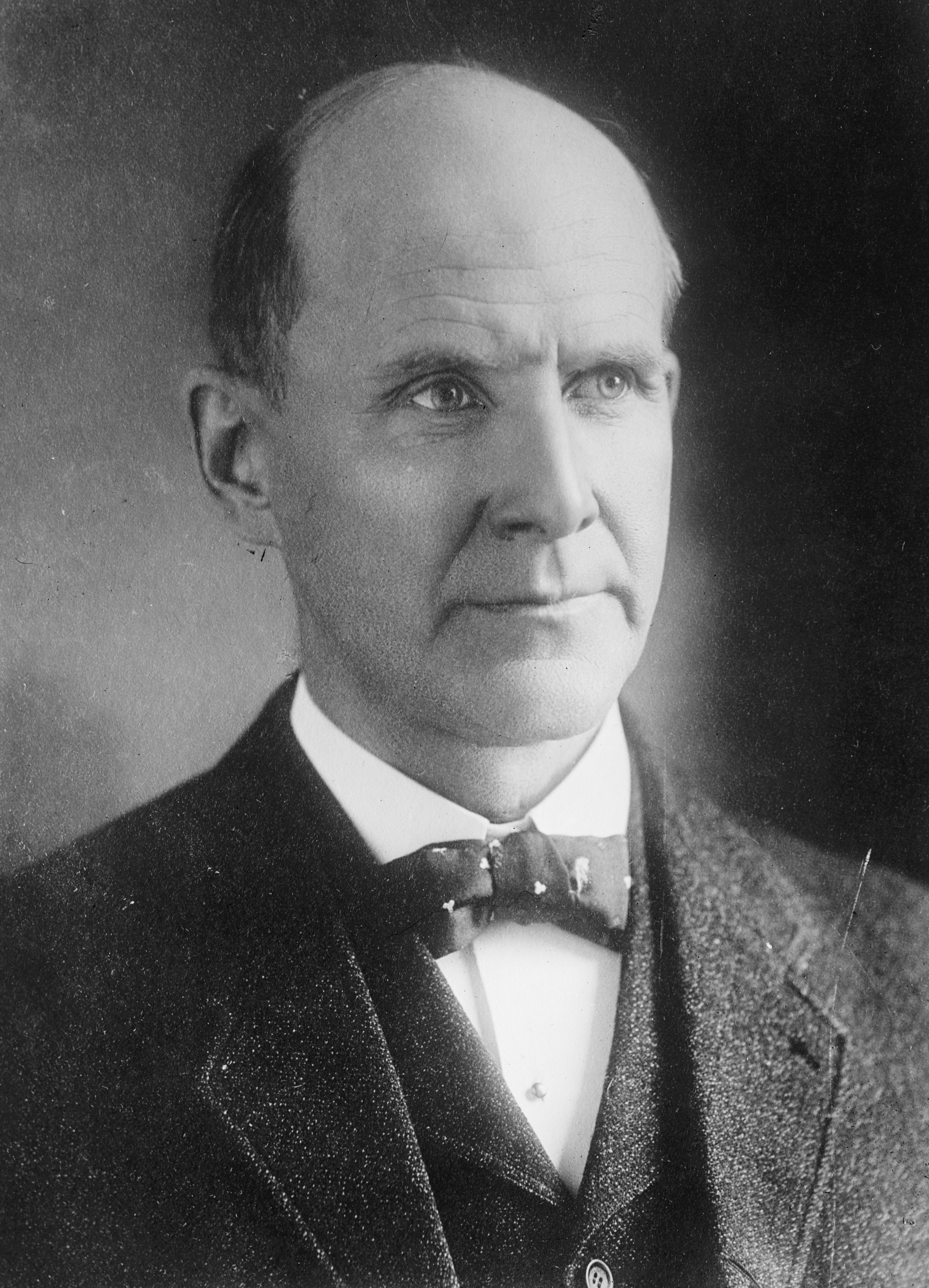
Nominee	Woodrow Wilson	Theodore Roosevelt
Party	Democratic	Progressive
Home state	New Jersey	New York
Running mate	Thomas R. Marshall	Hiram Johnson
Electoral vote	29	0
Popular vote	405,048	386,478
Percentage	35.34%	33.72%
Nominee	William Howard Taft	Eugene V. Debs
Party	Republican	Socialist
Home state	Ohio	Indiana
Running mate	Nicholas M. Butler	Emil Seidel
Electoral vote	0	0
Popular vote	253,593	81,278
Percentage	22.13%	7.09%
County results
Wilson
30–40%
40–50%
50–60%
60–70%
Roosevelt
30–40%
40–50%
50–60%
60–70%
Taft
30–40%
40–50%
50–60%
President before election
William Howard Taft
Republican
Elected President
Woodrow Wilson
Democratic

The 1912 United States presidential election in Illinois took place on November 5, 1912, as part of the 1912 United States presidential election. State voters chose 29 representatives, or electors, to the Electoral College, who voted for president and vice president.

Illinois was won by New Jersey Governor Woodrow Wilson (D–New Jersey), running with Indiana governor Thomas R. Marshall, with 35.34% of the popular vote, against the 26th president of the United States Theodore Roosevelt (P–New York), running with California governor Hiram Johnson, with 33.72% of the popular vote, the 27th president of the United States William Howard Taft (R–Ohio), running with Columbia University President Nicholas Murray Butler, with 22.13% of the popular vote and the five-time candidate of the Socialist Party of America for President of the United States Eugene V. Debs (S–Indiana), running with the first Socialist mayor of a major city in the United States Emil Seidel, with 7.09% of the popular vote.

As of the 2024 presidential election, this is the last election in which Lee County, Ogle County and Edwards County did not support the Republican nominee, and the last time the Democratic candidate carried Illinois without winning Cook County.

== Primaries ==
The first state-wide presidential preference primaries were held in Illinois on April 9, 1912, alongside primaries for other federal and state offices. The Democratic Party ballot included Champ Clark and Woodrow Wilson. The Prohibition Party ballot included Eugene W. Chafin. The Republican Party ballot included William Howard Taft, Theodore Roosevelt, and Robert M. La Follette. The Socialist Party of America ballot included Eugene V. Debs.

Delegates were allocated by congressional district, with each district awarding two delegates, and an additional eight delegates elected at-large. The total vote in the state-run primary elections was 732,222.

=== Democratic ===
1912 Illinois Democratic presidential primary
- April 9, 1912
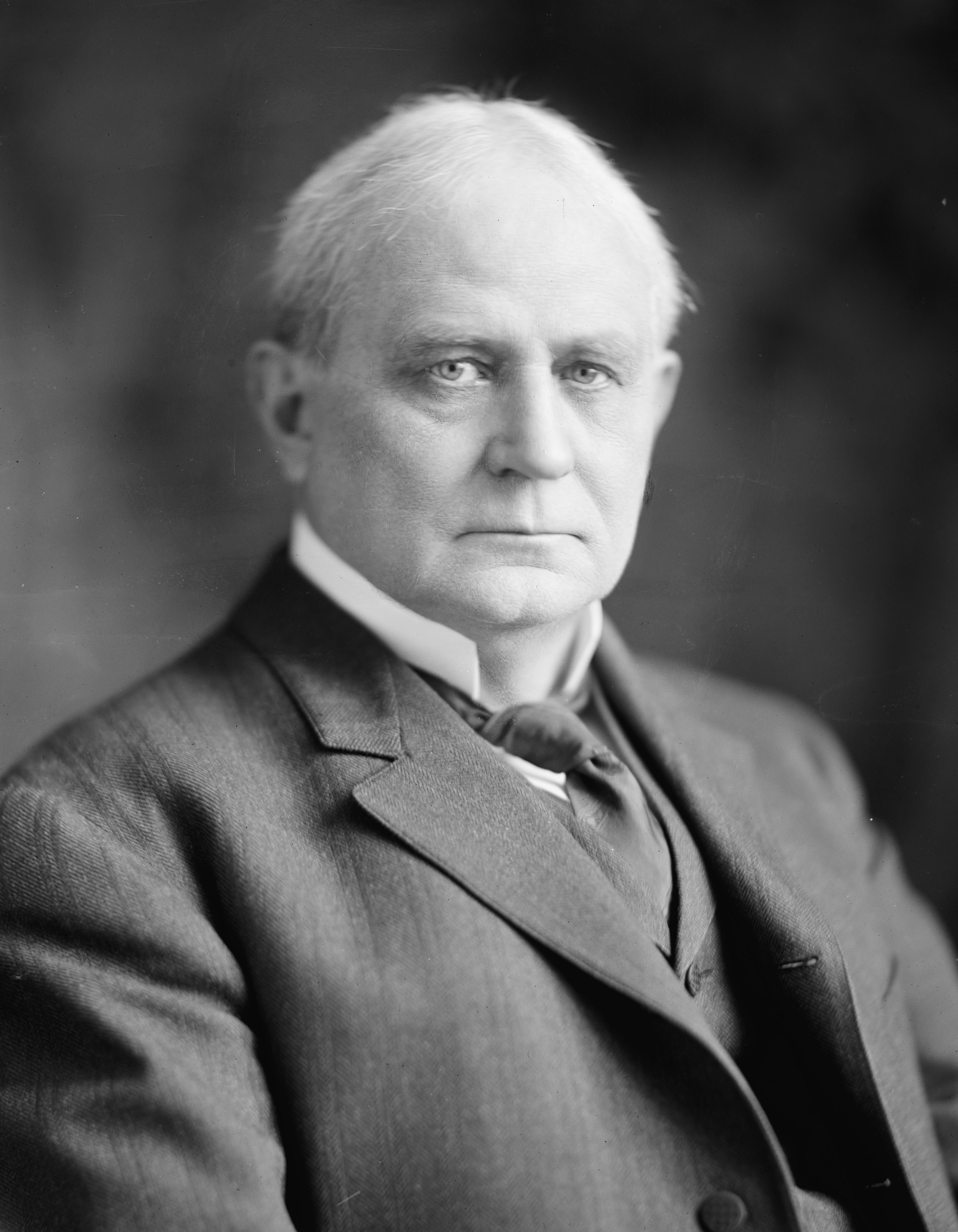

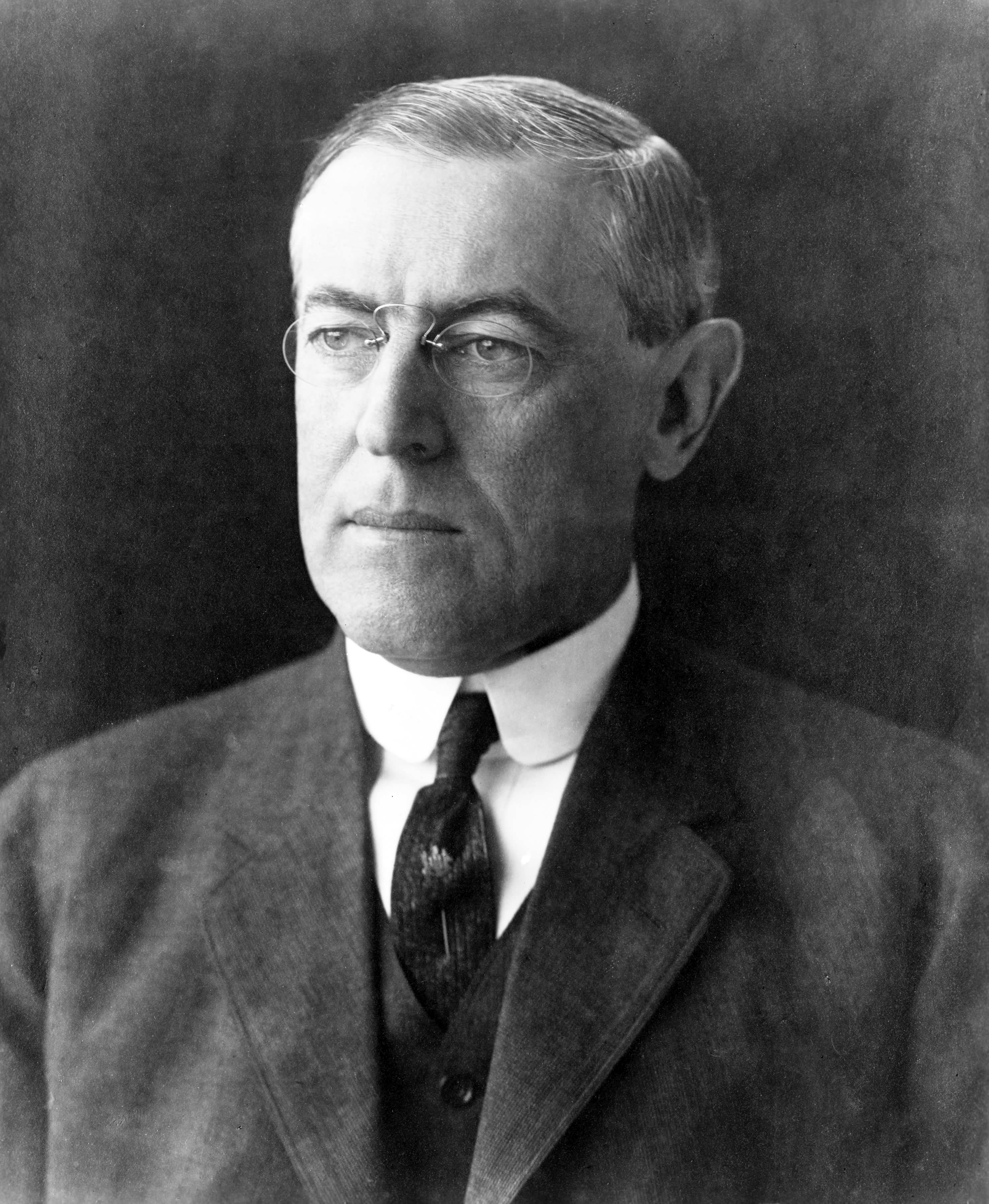
Candidate	Champ Clark	Woodrow Wilson
Home state	Missouri	New Jersey
Delegate count	58	0
Popular vote	218,483	75,527
Percentage	74.31%	25.69%

Clark:
50-60%
60-70%
70-80%
80-90%
>90%
Wilson:
50-60%
60-70%

A primary for the Democratic presidential candidate was held in Illinois on April 9, 1912. Clark defeated Wilson, winning 24 of the 25 congressional districts and all 58 of the delegates. Wilson, despite winning the 16th district, received no delegates due to the unit rule, which forced states to give all their votes to one candidate, even if that state elected delegates by congressional district.

1912 Illinois Democratic presidential primary
Candidate	Votes	%
Champ Clark	218,483	74.31
Woodrow Wilson	75,527	25.69
Total votes	294,010	100

=== Prohibition Party ===
A primary for the Prohibition presidential candidate was held in Illinois on April 9, 1912.

1912 Illinois Prohibition presidential primary
Candidate	Votes	%
Eugene W. Chafin	40	11.53
Scattering	307	88.47
Total votes	347	100

=== Republican ===
1912 Illinois Republican presidential primary
- April 9, 1912
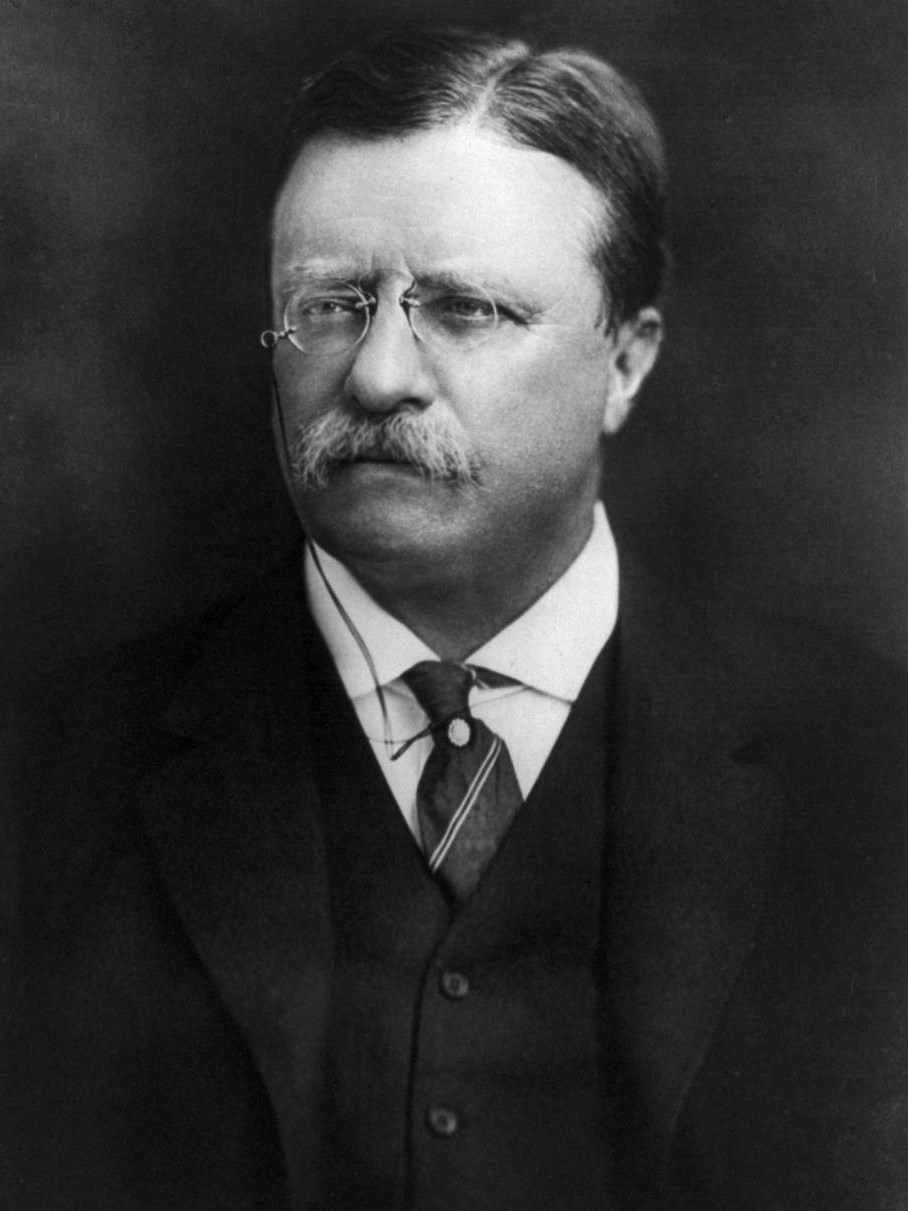

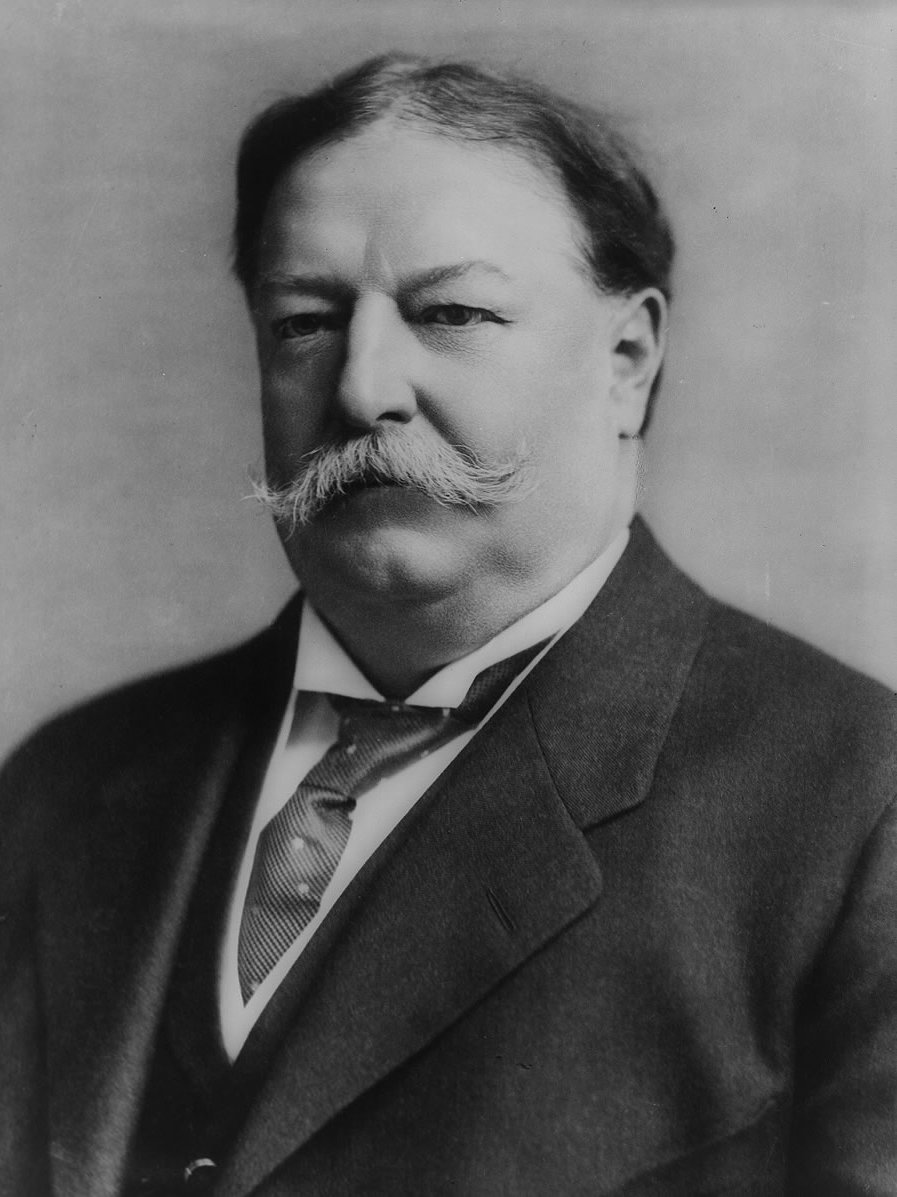

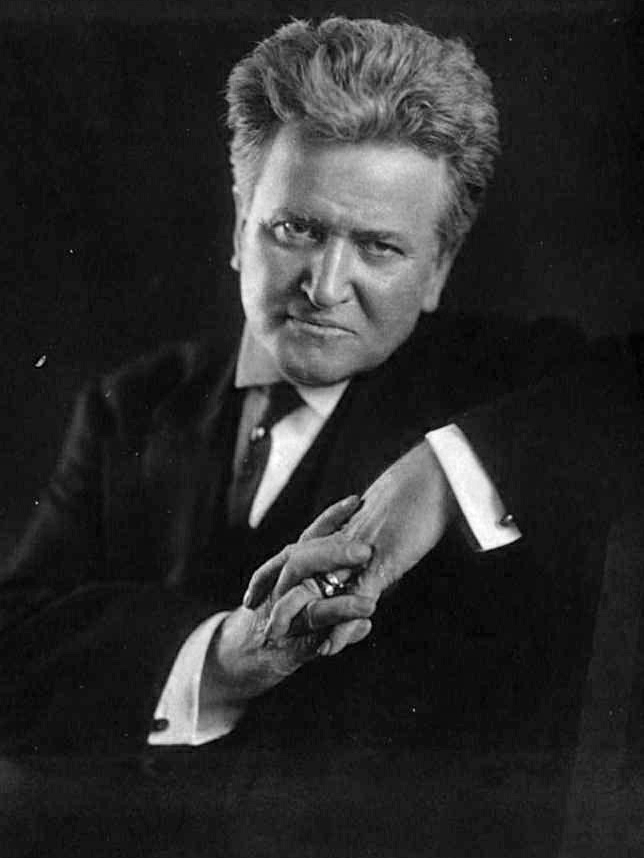
Candidate	Theodore Roosevelt	William Howard Taft	Robert La Follette
Home state	New York	Ohio	Wisconsin
Delegate count	56	2	0
Popular vote	266,917	127,481	42,692
Percentage	61.07%	29.17%	9.77%

Roosevelt:
40-50%
50-60%
60-70%
70-80%
Taft:
40-50%
50-60%

A primary for the Republican presidential candidate was held in Illinois on April 9, 1912. The primary saw Taft, supported by the Lorimer organization, face off against Roosevelt and Robert M. La Follette. Roosevelt defeated Taft two-to-one in the state, winning 24 of the 25 congressional districts, and therefore 56 of the delegates. La Follette performed strongest in mining and union labor districts. The New York Times attributed Roosevelt's victory in the state to anti-Lorimer sentiment, despite Taft's private dislike of Senator William Lorimer. Additionally, some of the support was attributed to anti-reciprocity sentiment held among farmers in the state.

1912 Illinois Republican presidential primary
Candidate	Votes	%
Theodore Roosevelt	266,917	61.07
William H. Taft (incumbent)	127,481	29.17
Robert M. La Follette	42,692	9.77
Total votes	437,090	100

=== Socialist Party ===
A primary for the Socialist Party of America presidential candidate was held in Illinois on April 9, 1912.

1912 Illinois Socialist presidential primary
Candidate	Votes	%
Eugene V. Debs	334	43.10
Scattering	441	56.90
Total votes	775	100

== Results ==
The total vote in the general election was 1,146,173. The general elections coincided with those for House as well as those for state offices.

1912 United States presidential election in Illinois
Party	Candidate	Votes	%
Democratic	Woodrow Wilson	405,048	35.34%
Progressive	Theodore Roosevelt	386,478	33.72%
Republican	William Howard Taft (incumbent)	253,593	22.13%
Socialist	Eugene V. Debs	81,278	7.09%
Prohibition	Eugene W. Chafin	15,710	1.37%
Socialist Labor	Arthur Reimer	4,066	0.35%
Total votes		1,146,173	100%

=== Chicago results ===
1912 United States presidential election in Chicago
Party	Candidate	Votes	Percentage
Progressive	Theodore Roosevelt	150,290	37.18%
Democratic	Woodrow Wilson	124,297	30.75%
Republican	William Howard Taft	71,030	17.57%
Socialist	Eugene Debs	53,743	13.30%
Prohibition	Eugene Chafin	2,806	0.69%
Others		2,040	0.50%
Totals		404,206	100.00%

=== Results by county ===
County	Thomas Woodrow Wilson Democratic		William Howard Taft Republican		Theodore Roosevelt Progressive "Bull Moose"		Eugene Victor Debs Socialist		Various candidates Other parties		Margin (Note: Because Roosevelt finished ahead of Taft in Illinois as a whole, all vote and percentage margins give are Wilson minus Roosevelt unless stated in the total for the county in question.)		Total votes cast
County	#	%	#	%	#	%	#	%	#	%	#	%	Total votes cast
Adams	6,952	48.74%	2,733	19.16%	3,780	26.50%	559	3.92%	239	1.68%	3,172	22.24%	14,263
Alexander	1,936	40.39%	2,003	41.79%	709	14.79%	107	2.23%	38	0.79%	-67 (Note: In this county where Roosevelt ran third behind both Taft and Wilson, the margin given is Wilson vote minus Taft vote and percentage margin Wilson percentage minus Taft percentage.)	-1.40%	4,793
Bond	1,278	37.23%	1,152	33.56%	725	21.12%	64	1.86%	214	6.23%	126	3.67%	3,433
Boone	540	14.67%	1,361	36.96%	1,624	44.11%	113	3.07%	44	1.20%	-263 (Note: In this county where Wilson ran third behind both Taft and Roosevelt, margin given is Taft vote minus Roosevelt vote and percentage margin Taft percentage minus Roosevelt percentage.)	-7.14%	3,682
Brown	1,358	58.74%	381	16.48%	524	22.66%	12	0.52%	37	1.60%	834	36.07%	2,312
Bureau	2,800	30.59%	1,816	19.84%	3,738	40.84%	549	6.00%	250	2.73%	-938	-10.25%	9,153
Calhoun	602	49.43%	373	30.62%	154	12.64%	22	1.81%	67	5.50%	229	18.80%	1,218
Carroll	1,098	26.71%	1,577	38.36%	1,257	30.58%	84	2.04%	95	2.31%	320	7.78%	4,111
Cass	2,223	52.99%	719	17.14%	1,086	25.89%	103	2.46%	64	1.53%	1,137	27.10%	4,195
Champaign	4,454	35.43%	3,220	25.62%	4,481	35.65%	172	1.37%	243	1.93%	-27	-0.21%	12,570
Christian	3,821	48.48%	1,994	25.30%	1,464	18.57%	376	4.77%	227	2.88%	1,827	23.18%	7,882
Clark	2,517	45.34%	1,897	34.17%	943	16.98%	49	0.88%	146	2.63%	620	11.17%	5,552
Clay	1,926	44.37%	1,622	37.36%	624	14.37%	84	1.94%	85	1.96%	304	7.00%	4,341
Clinton	2,674	56.29%	973	20.48%	775	16.32%	265	5.58%	63	1.33%	1,701	35.81%	4,750
Coles	3,453	40.98%	2,263	26.86%	2,437	28.92%	170	2.02%	103	1.22%	1,016	12.06%	8,426
Cook	130,702	30.44%	74,851	17.44%	166,061	38.68%	52,659	12.27%	5,039	1.17%	-35,359	-8.24%	429,312
Crawford	2,691	47.41%	1,266	22.30%	1,525	26.87%	65	1.15%	129	2.27%	1,166	20.54%	5,676
Cumberland	1,673	48.63%	990	28.78%	692	20.12%	31	0.90%	54	1.57%	683	19.85%	3,440
DeKalb	1,568	21.44%	1,776	24.28%	3,643	49.81%	205	2.80%	122	1.67%	-1,867	-25.53%	7,314
DeWitt	1,880	39.79%	1,346	28.49%	1,306	27.64%	119	2.52%	74	1.57%	534	11.30%	4,725
Douglas	1,633	36.56%	1,386	31.03%	1,277	28.59%	53	1.19%	118	2.64%	247	5.53%	4,467
DuPage	2,236	28.09%	1,136	14.27%	4,169	52.37%	193	2.42%	227	2.85%	-1,933	-24.28%	7,961
Edgar	3,479	47.02%	2,430	32.84%	1,244	16.81%	91	1.23%	155	2.09%	1,049	14.18%	7,399
Edwards	650	27.04%	817	33.99%	818	34.03%	16	0.67%	103	4.28%	-1	-0.04%	2,404
Effingham	2,575	59.76%	1,002	23.25%	622	14.43%	46	1.07%	64	1.49%	1,573	36.50%	4,309
Fayette	2,782	46.04%	1,481	24.51%	1,558	25.79%	82	1.36%	139	2.30%	1,224	20.26%	6,042
Ford	1,035	27.91%	832	22.44%	1,729	46.63%	23	0.62%	89	2.40%	-694	-18.72%	3,708
Franklin	2,435	41.92%	2,098	36.12%	731	12.58%	407	7.01%	138	2.38%	337	5.80%	5,809
Fulton	3,902	35.06%	2,263	20.33%	3,334	29.96%	1,334	11.99%	297	2.67%	568	5.10%	11,130
Gallatin	1,697	54.55%	1,051	33.78%	203	6.53%	107	3.44%	53	1.70%	646	20.77%	3,111
Greene	2,801	57.44%	1,064	21.82%	831	17.04%	124	2.54%	56	1.15%	1,737	35.62%	4,876
Grundy	1,172	24.77%	1,380	29.17%	1,919	40.56%	180	3.80%	80	1.69%	-539	-11.39%	4,731
Hamilton	1,920	48.44%	1,242	31.33%	668	16.85%	79	1.99%	55	1.39%	678	17.10%	3,964
Hancock	3,692	48.80%	1,577	20.84%	1,937	25.60%	188	2.48%	172	2.27%	1,755	23.20%	7,566
Hardin	644	40.63%	691	43.60%	153	9.65%	47	2.97%	50	3.15%	-47	-2.97%	1,585
Henderson	721	30.97%	648	27.84%	871	37.41%	31	1.33%	57	2.45%	-150	-6.44%	2,328
Henry	2,219	24.22%	1,859	20.29%	4,505	49.17%	376	4.10%	204	2.23%	-2,286	-24.95%	9,163
Iroquois	2,474	32.92%	1,866	24.83%	2,959	39.37%	52	0.69%	165	2.20%	-485	-6.45%	7,516
Jackson	3,323	42.42%	2,780	35.49%	1,339	17.09%	268	3.42%	123	1.57%	543	6.93%	7,833
Jasper	2,042	51.77%	1,227	31.11%	545	13.82%	16	0.41%	114	2.89%	815	20.66%	3,944
Jefferson	3,237	48.94%	1,834	27.73%	1,294	19.56%	142	2.15%	107	1.62%	1,403	21.21%	6,614
Jersey	1,573	55.06%	838	29.33%	381	13.34%	12	0.42%	53	1.86%	735	25.73%	2,857
Jo Daviess	2,226	40.77%	1,233	22.58%	1,747	32.00%	139	2.55%	115	2.11%	479	8.77%	5,460
Johnson	952	32.57%	1,025	35.07%	809	27.68%	66	2.26%	71	2.43%	-73	-2.50%	2,923
Kane	4,394	23.05%	2,415	12.67%	11,494	60.29%	529	2.77%	234	1.23%	-7,100	-37.24%	19,066
Kankakee	2,532	29.01%	3,178	36.41%	2,792	31.99%	141	1.62%	85	0.97%	386	4.42%	8,728
Kendall	531	20.03%	534	20.14%	1,526	57.56%	21	0.79%	39	1.47%	-992	-37.42%	2,651
Knox	2,758	26.35%	1,750	16.72%	5,386	51.46%	405	3.87%	168	1.61%	-2,628	-25.11%	10,467
Lake	2,436	24.09%	2,183	21.59%	4,888	48.33%	445	4.40%	161	1.59%	-2,452	-24.25%	10,113
LaSalle	7,036	35.56%	4,858	24.56%	6,918	34.97%	636	3.21%	336	1.70%	118	0.60%	19,784
Lawrence	2,550	47.93%	1,617	30.39%	774	14.55%	170	3.20%	209	3.93%	933	17.54%	5,320
Lee	1,995	31.00%	1,482	23.03%	2,747	42.68%	115	1.79%	97	1.51%	-752	-11.68%	6,436
Livingston	3,334	36.01%	2,444	26.40%	3,230	34.89%	71	0.77%	179	1.93%	104	1.12%	9,258
Logan	3,229	48.19%	1,397	20.85%	1,776	26.50%	163	2.43%	136	2.03%	1,453	21.68%	6,701
Macon	4,435	36.12%	3,356	27.33%	3,976	32.38%	293	2.39%	218	1.78%	459	3.74%	12,278
Macoupin	4,902	47.53%	2,177	21.11%	2,147	20.82%	806	7.81%	282	2.73%	2,725	26.42%	10,314
Madison	7,155	40.04%	5,462	30.57%	3,197	17.89%	1,703	9.53%	351	1.96%	1,693	9.48%	17,868
Marion	3,493	44.26%	1,586	20.10%	2,099	26.60%	498	6.31%	216	2.74%	1,394	17.66%	7,892
Marshall	1,685	44.72%	790	20.97%	1,180	31.32%	42	1.11%	71	1.88%	505	13.40%	3,768
Mason	2,173	52.73%	948	23.00%	859	20.84%	45	1.09%	96	2.33%	1,225	29.73%	4,121
Massac	599	21.47%	1,341	48.06%	788	28.24%	21	0.75%	41	1.47%	553	19.82%	2,790
McDonough	2,959	42.44%	1,876	26.90%	1,785	25.60%	181	2.60%	172	2.47%	1,083	15.53%	6,973
McHenry	1,913	25.69%	2,370	31.82%	3,046	40.90%	39	0.52%	79	1.06%	-676	-9.08%	7,447
McLean	5,356	35.02%	4,624	30.23%	4,350	28.44%	562	3.67%	402	2.63%	732	4.79%	15,294
Menard	1,530	48.19%	620	19.53%	903	28.44%	60	1.89%	62	1.95%	627	19.75%	3,175
Mercer	1,602	32.07%	959	19.20%	2,093	41.89%	222	4.44%	120	2.40%	-491	-9.83%	4,996
Monroe	1,398	44.31%	1,433	45.42%	299	9.48%	19	0.60%	6	0.19%	-35	-1.11%	3,155
Montgomery	3,705	45.69%	2,195	27.07%	1,476	18.20%	469	5.78%	264	3.26%	1,510	18.62%	8,109
Morgan	3,648	48.11%	1,466	19.34%	2,090	27.57%	193	2.55%	185	2.44%	1,558	20.55%	7,582
Moultrie	1,501	46.96%	747	23.37%	853	26.69%	29	0.91%	66	2.07%	648	20.28%	3,196
Ogle	1,750	25.95%	2,014	29.86%	2,720	40.33%	57	0.85%	204	3.02%	-706	-10.47%	6,745
Peoria	8,364	37.98%	2,594	11.78%	9,229	41.91%	1,571	7.13%	262	1.19%	-865	-3.93%	22,020
Perry	2,107	44.53%	1,341	28.34%	894	18.89%	215	4.54%	175	3.70%	766	16.19%	4,732
Piatt	1,417	37.84%	1,064	28.41%	1,150	30.71%	36	0.96%	78	2.08%	267	7.13%	3,745
Pike	3,371	50.90%	1,668	25.18%	1,169	17.65%	253	3.82%	162	2.45%	1,703	25.71%	6,623
Pope	664	27.68%	1,099	45.81%	587	24.47%	24	1.00%	25	1.04%	-435	-18.13%	2,399
Pulaski	978	30.73%	1,632	51.27%	454	14.26%	78	2.45%	41	1.29%	-654	-20.55%	3,183
Putnam	424	29.00%	403	27.56%	583	39.88%	28	1.92%	24	1.64%	-159	-10.88%	1,462
Randolph	3,217	50.38%	1,548	24.24%	1,169	18.31%	308	4.82%	144	2.25%	1,669	26.14%	6,386
Richland	1,800	48.39%	862	23.17%	811	21.80%	114	3.06%	133	3.58%	938	25.22%	3,720
Rock Island	3,997	26.14%	2,394	15.66%	6,506	42.55%	2,128	13.92%	264	1.73%	-2,509	-16.41%	15,289
Saline	3,599	44.37%	2,254	27.79%	1,468	18.10%	660	8.14%	130	1.60%	1,345	16.58%	8,111
Sangamon	8,406	42.25%	3,994	20.07%	6,196	31.14%	1,007	5.06%	294	1.48%	2,210	11.11%	19,897
Schuyler	1,714	50.00%	853	24.88%	694	20.25%	31	0.90%	136	3.97%	861	25.12%	3,428
Scott	1,341	54.53%	686	27.90%	379	15.41%	25	1.02%	28	1.14%	655	26.64%	2,459
Shelby	3,467	50.33%	1,629	23.65%	1,431	20.77%	121	1.76%	241	3.50%	1,838	26.68%	6,889
St. Clair	10,826	41.85%	8,156	31.53%	4,064	15.71%	2,498	9.66%	322	1.24%	2,670	10.32%	25,866
Stark	669	28.59%	549	23.46%	1,053	45.00%	41	1.75%	28	1.20%	-384	-16.41%	2,340
Stephenson	3,850	42.49%	1,367	15.09%	3,476	38.37%	215	2.37%	152	1.68%	374	4.13%	9,060
Tazewell	3,654	47.35%	1,054	13.66%	2,500	32.40%	371	4.81%	138	1.79%	1,154	14.95%	7,717
Union	2,648	60.36%	1,194	27.22%	458	10.44%	23	0.52%	64	1.46%	1,454	33.14%	4,387
Vermilion	5,576	31.80%	5,655	32.25%	4,984	28.43%	714	4.07%	604	3.44%	-79	-0.45%	17,533
Wabash	1,676	50.41%	841	25.29%	601	18.08%	72	2.17%	135	4.06%	835	25.11%	3,325
Warren	2,080	34.86%	915	15.34%	2,627	44.03%	237	3.97%	107	1.79%	-547	-9.17%	5,966
Washington	1,654	39.06%	1,304	30.80%	1,058	24.99%	135	3.19%	83	1.96%	350	8.27%	4,234
Wayne	2,378	42.26%	1,586	28.19%	1,418	25.20%	74	1.32%	171	3.04%	792	14.07%	5,627
White	2,708	51.11%	1,692	31.94%	591	11.16%	182	3.44%	125	2.36%	1,016	19.18%	5,298
Whiteside	1,996	25.89%	1,437	18.64%	3,904	50.63%	91	1.18%	283	3.67%	-1,908	-24.74%	7,711
Will	4,717	28.13%	3,331	19.87%	8,092	48.26%	467	2.79%	160	0.95%	-3,375	-20.13%	16,767
Williamson	3,258	35.16%	3,209	34.63%	1,765	19.05%	706	7.62%	329	3.55%	49	0.53%	9,267
Winnebago	2,276	17.37%	2,537	19.36%	7,089	54.09%	955	7.29%	248	1.89%	-4,552	-34.73%	13,105
Woodford	2,051	45.06%	850	18.67%	1,495	32.84%	83	1.82%	73	1.60%	556	12.21%	4,552
Totals	405,048	35.34%	253,593	22.13%	386,478	33.72%	81,278	7.09%	19,776	1.73%	18,570	1.62%	1,146,173

== See also ==
- United States presidential elections in Illinois
