= Long Creek, Illinois =

- Village
- Location in Macon County, Illinois
- Coordinates: 39°48′26″N 88°51′45″W
- Country: United States
- State: Illinois
- County: Macon
- Township: Long Creek

Area
  - Total: 2.83 sq mi (7.32 km^{2})
  - Land: 2.83 sq mi (7.32 km^{2})
  - Water: 0 sq mi (0.00 km^{2})
- Elevation: 663 ft (202 m)

Population (2020)
  - Total: 1,261
  - Density: 446.4/sq mi (172.34/km^{2})
- Time zone: UTC-6 (CST)
  - Summer (DST): UTC-5 (CDT)
- ZIP code: 62521
- Area code: 217
- FIPS code: 17-44498
- GNIS feature ID: 2398470
- Website: villageoflongcreekil.gov

Long Creek is a village in Macon County, Illinois, United States. As of the 2020 census there were 1,261 people. It is included in the Decatur, Illinois Metropolitan Statistical Area.

== History ==
Long Creek is named for the creek that runs through the area.

The first settlers arrived in 1828 from North Carolina and subsequently built log cabins and made improvements on the surrounding land. In the fall of 1828, a band of Native Americans from the Kickapoo Tribe of Oklahoma arrived and set up camp along Long Creek and began trapping, hunting, and fishing. When they were relatively unsuccessful at catching game, the Kickapoo began killing hogs and stealing poultry from the early settlers. Eventually a group of settlers drove them from the county.

During the early 1830s the area saw more settlers arriving, and the first schoolhouse was constructed in 1834. The school also served as a place of worship before the first church was built in 1842.

== Geography ==
Long Creek is located in eastern Macon County. It is bordered to the northwest by the city of Decatur, the county seat, and to the southwest by the village of Mount Zion. U.S. Route 36 runs along the northern edge of Long Creek village, leading northwest 6 miles (10 km) to the center of Decatur and east 31 miles (50 km) to Tuscola.

According to the 2021 census gazetteer files, Long Creek has a total area of 2.83 square miles (7.33 km^{2}), all land. Long Creek flows through the center of the village limits, running west to Finley Creek at the southeast arm of Lake Decatur, a reservoir on the Sangamon River.

== Demographics ==
Historical population
Census	Pop.	Note	%±
1990	1,250		—
2000	1,364		9.1%
2010	1,328		−2.6%
2020	1,261		−5.0%
U.S. Decennial Census

As of the 2020 census there were 1,261 people, 561 households, and 452 families residing in the village. The population density was 446.37 inhabitants per square mile (172.34/km^{2}). The racial makeup of the village was 93.81% White, 0.40% African American, 0.08% Native American, 0.32% Asian, 0.16% Pacific Islander, 0.24% from other races, and 5.00% from two or more races. Hispanic or Latino of any race were 1.82% of the population.

There were 561 households, out of which 28.3% had children under the age of 18 living with them, 67.02% were married couples living together, 10.16% had a female householder with no husband present, and 19.43% were non-families. 15.51% of all households were made up of individuals, and 6.77% had someone living alone who was 65 years of age or older. The average household size was 2.87 and the average family size was 2.59.

The village's age distribution consisted of 21.5% under the age of 18, 6.5% from 18 to 24, 14.1% from 25 to 44, 38.9% from 45 to 64, and 19.1% who were 65 years of age or older. The median age was 50.4 years. For every 100 females, there were 90.8 males. For every 100 females age 18 and over, there were 89.9 males.

The median income for a household in the village was $78,977, and the median income for a family was $87,344. Males had a median income of $62,066 versus $40,682 for females. The per capita income for the village was $34,101. About 6.9% of families and 8.5% of the population were below the poverty line, including 11.9% of those under age 18 and 8.3% of those age 65 or over.

There were 535 housing units, of which 5.0% were vacant. The homeowner vacancy rate was 0.6% and the rental vacancy rate was 0.0%.

Racial composition as of the 2020 census
Race	Number	Percent
White	1,183	93.8%
Black or African American	5	0.4%
American Indian and Alaska Native	1	0.1%
Asian	4	0.3%
Native Hawaiian and Other Pacific Islander	2	0.2%
Some other race	3	0.2%
Two or more races	63	5.0%
Hispanic or Latino (of any race)	23	1.8%

== Education ==
It is a part of the Mount Zion Community Unit School District 3.
