= 1988 United States presidential election in Illinois =

- November 8, 1988
- Turnout: 73.89% ▼

Nominee	George H. W. Bush	Michael Dukakis
Party	Republican	Democratic
Home state	Texas	Massachusetts
Running mate	Dan Quayle	Lloyd Bentsen
Electoral vote	24	0
Popular vote	2,310,939	2,215,940
Percentage	50.69%	48.60%

Bush
40–50%
50–60%
60–70%
70–80%
80–90%
Dukakis
40–50%
50–60%
60–70%
70–80%
80–90%
90–100%
President before election
Ronald Reagan
Republican
Elected President
George H. W. Bush
Republican

The 1988 United States presidential election in Illinois took place on November 8, 1988. All 50 states and the District of Columbia were part of the 1988 United States presidential election. State voters chose 24 electors to the Electoral College, which selected the president and vice president. Illinois was won by incumbent United States Vice President George H. W. Bush of Texas, who was running against Massachusetts Governor Michael Dukakis. Bush ran with Indiana Senator Dan Quayle as vice president, and Dukakis ran with Texas Senator Lloyd Bentsen.

Illinois weighed in for this election as 5.4% more Democratic than the national average. Bush won the election in rapidly liberalizing Illinois with a narrow 2-point margin. Like the neighboring state of Missouri, Bush's performance here was far below that of President Ronald Reagan's just four years earlier. Bush's loss of many down-state rural counties, combined with Dukakis's stronger than normal performance across much of the state, especially in Cook County, which houses the Chicago area, made the election results in this state much closer than usual.

This was the sixth consecutive presidential election in which Illinois voted Republican, the last in a streak that began in 1968. As of the 2024 presidential election, this is the last time that Illinois voted Republican in a presidential election. 1988 is also the most recent election in which Peoria County and Champaign County voted for a Republican presidential candidate, as well as the last time a Republican candidate won more than 40% of the vote in Cook County, home to Chicago. Republicans would not win Whiteside County again until 2016. Additionally, this was the last time that Illinois was not the most Democratic state in the Midwest at the presidential level.

== Primaries ==
The primaries and general elections coincided with those for congress, as well as those for state offices.

=== Turnout ===
Turnout during the state-run primaries was 39.82%, with 2,359,737 votes cast.

Turnout during the general election was 71.72%, 4,559,120 votes cast.

=== Democratic ===
1988 Illinois Democratic presidential primary
- March 15, 1988
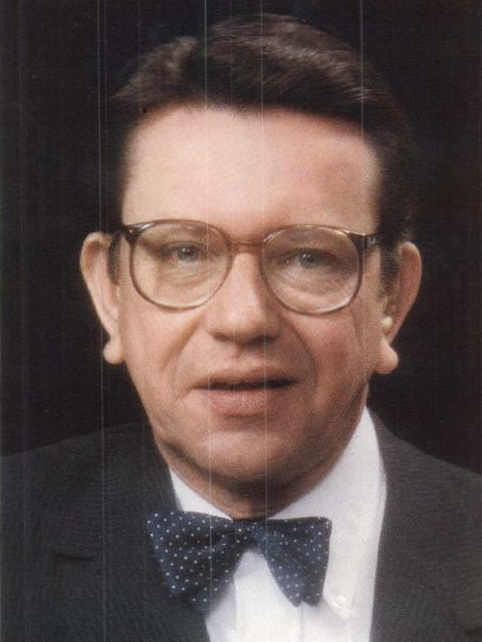

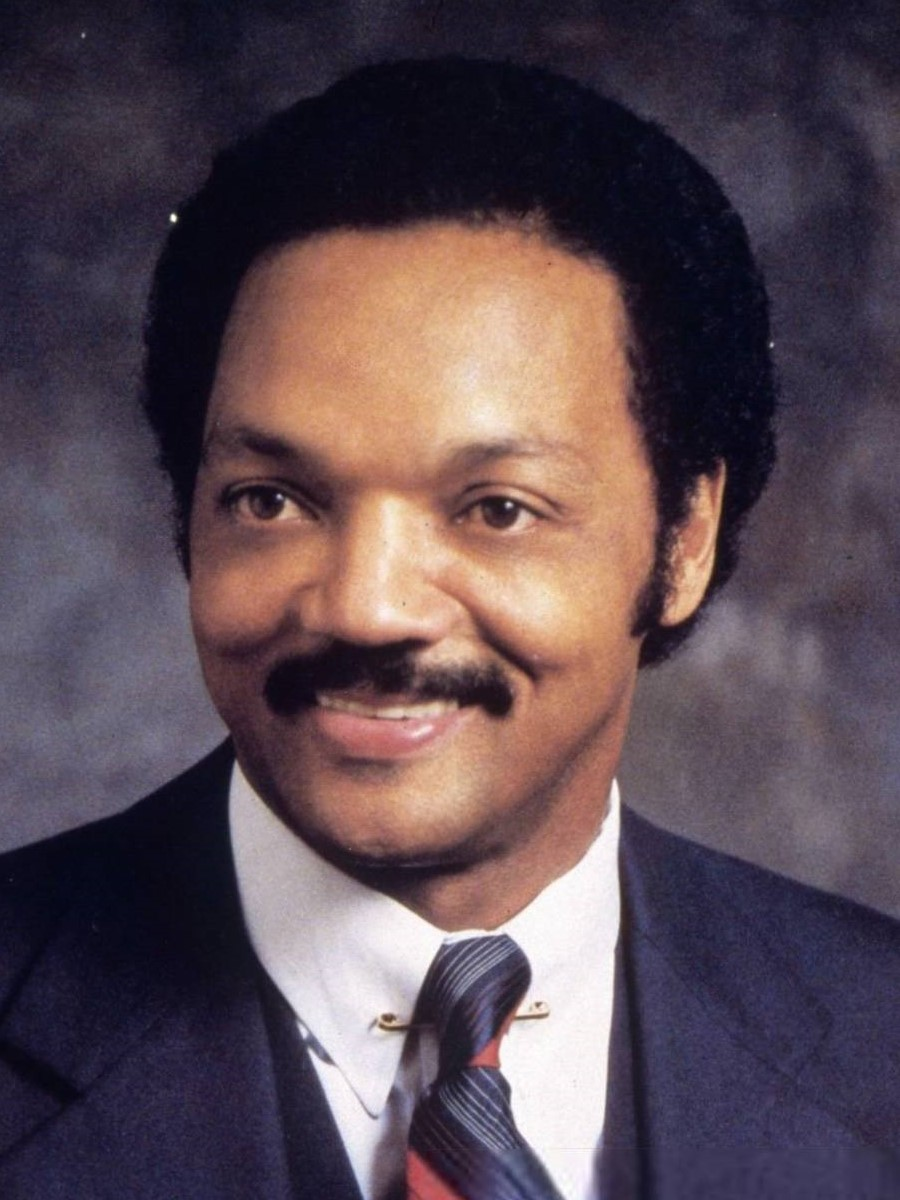

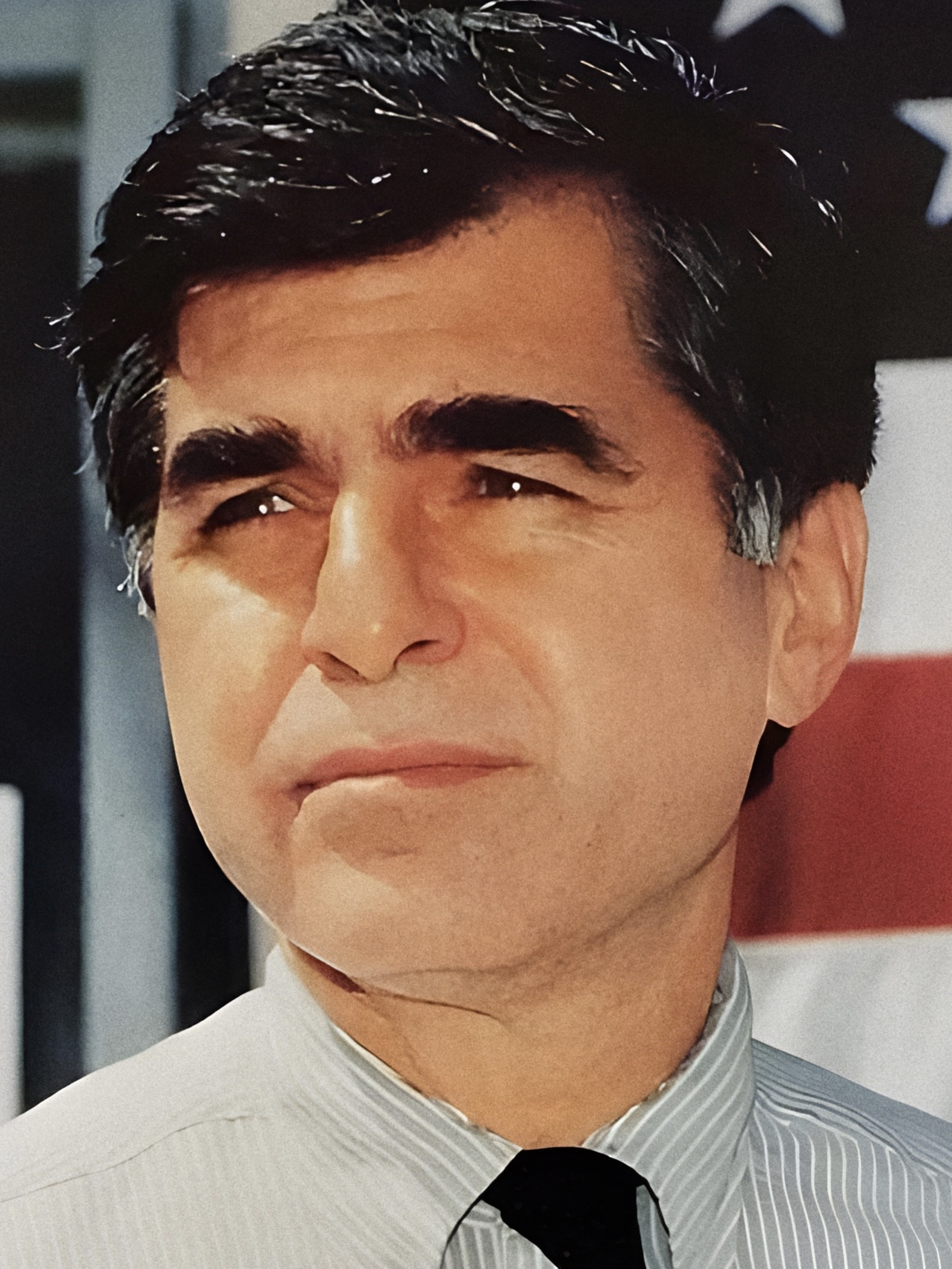

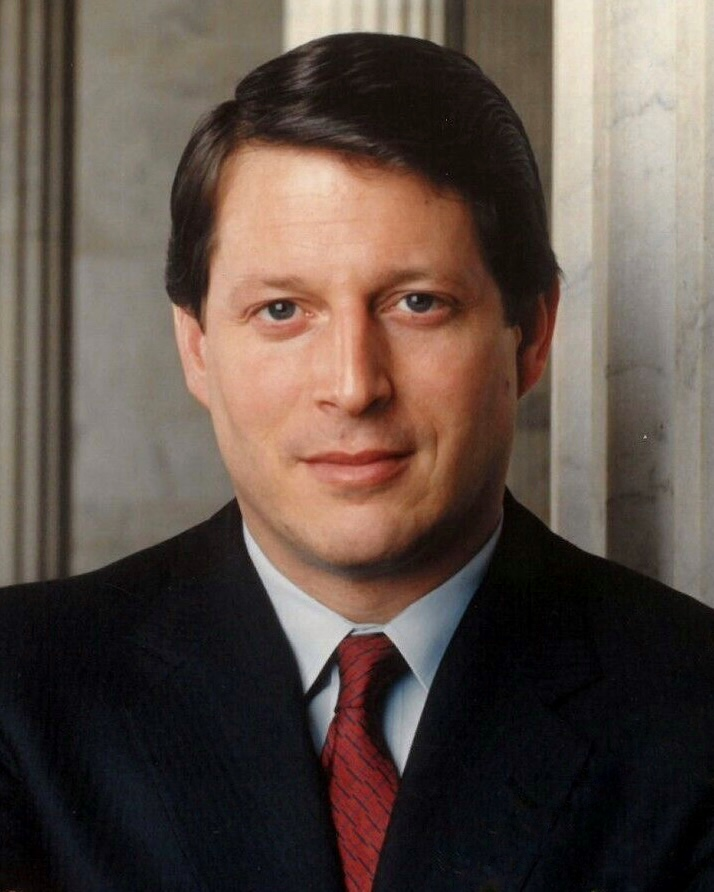
Candidate	Paul Simon	Jesse Jackson
Home state	Illinois	Illinois
Popular vote	635,219	387,891
Percentage	42.32%	32.26%
Candidate	Michael Dukakis	Al Gore
Home state	Massachusetts	Tennessee
Popular vote	245,289	77,265
Percentage	16.34%	5.15%
County Results
Simon
30-40%
40-50%
50-60%
60-70%
70-80%
80-90%
90-100%
Jackson
40-50%

The 1988 Illinois Democratic presidential primary was held on March 15, 1988, in the U.S. state of Illinois as one of the Democratic Party's statewide nomination contests ahead of the 1988 presidential election.

1988 Illinois Democratic presidential primary
Candidate	Votes	%	Delegates
Paul Simon	635,219	42.32	
Jesse L. Jackson	484,233	32.26	
Michael S. Dukakis	245,289	16.34	
Al Gore	77,265	5.15	
Dick Gephardt	35,108	2.34	
Gary Hart withdrew	12,769	0.85	
Lyndon H. LaRouche	6,094	0.41	
Bruce Babbitt withdrew	4,953	0.33	
Total	1,500,930	100	

==== Analysis ====
Senator Paul Simon was able to secure a victory in the Illinois Democratic primary. Simon was the favorite son candidate and used that to his advantage to secure Illinois's delegates. However, Jesse Jackson (who had strong ties to Chicago) was able to obtain about 90% of the African-American vote in the primary, and despite Simon being supported by the withering Chicago Democratic machine, Jackson was able to win Cook County (the location of Chicago), securing Jackson's second place in the primary

=== Republican ===
1988 Illinois Republican presidential primary
- March 15, 1988

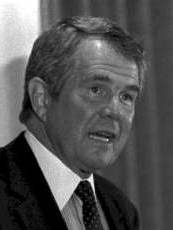
Candidate	George H. W. Bush	Bob Dole	Pat Robertson
Home state	Texas	Kansas	Virginia
Popular vote	469,151	309,253	59,087
Percentage	54.64%	36.02%	6.88%
County Results
Bush
40-50%
50-60%
60-70%
Dole
40-50%
50-60%

The 1988 Illinois Republican presidential primary was held on March 15, 1988, in the U.S. state of Illinois as one of the Republican Party's statewide nomination contests ahead of the 1988 presidential election.

1992 Illinois Republican presidential primary
Candidate	Votes	%	Delegates
George Bush	469,151	54.64	
Bob Dole	309,253	36.02	
Pat Robertson	59,087	6.88	
Jack F. Kemp withdrew	12,687	1.48	
Pete du Pont withdrew	4,653	0.54	
Alexander M. Haig Jr. withdrew	3,806	0.44	
Total	858,637	100	

==== Analysis ====
George H. W. Bush won the Illinois Republican primary securing 61 delegates. Bush was the clear favorite to win in the Illinois primary, with him doing well among moderates, conservatives, and liberals. Bush also did well with many voters who positively viewed Reagan and his administration, however Bob Dole did well among voters who disapproved of Reagan's administration. The impact of this race further solidified Bush's supremacy in the Republican Primary and furthered his lead among his opponents.

=== Illinois Solidarity ===
1988 Illinois Solidarity primary
- March 15, 1988
Candidate	Lenora Fulani
Home state	Pennsylvania
Popular vote	170
Percentage	100%

The 1988 Illinois Solidarity presidential primary was held on March 15, 1988, in the U.S. state of Illinois. Lenora Fulani won, running unopposed.

1988 Illinois Solidarity primary
Candidate	Votes	%
Lenora Fulani	170	100
Total	170	100

== Results ==
1988 United States presidential election in Illinois
Party	Candidate	Running mate	Votes	%	Electoral votes
Republican	George Bush	Dan Quayle	2,310,939	50.69%	24
Democratic	Michael Dukakis	Lloyd Bentsen	2,215,940	48.60%	0
Libertarian	Ron Paul	Andre Marrou	14,944	0.33%	0
Illinois Solidarity	Lenora Fulani	Joyce Dattner	10,276	0.23%	0
Socialist Equality Party	Edward Winn	Barry Porster	7,021	0.15%	0
Total			4,559,120	100.0%	24

=== Results by county ===
County	George H.W. Bush Republican		Michael Dukakis Democratic		Ron Paul Libertarian		Leonora Fulani Illinois Solidarity		Edward Winn Socialist		Margin		Total votes cast
County	#	%	#	%	#	%	#	%	#	%	#	%	Total votes cast
Adams	15,831	53.29%	13,768	46.34%	64	0.22%	18	0.06%	29	0.10%	2,063	6.95%	29,710
Alexander	1,954	41.90%	2,693	57.75%	4	0.09%	8	0.17%	4	0.09%	-739	-15.85%	4,663
Bond	3,608	50.78%	3,459	48.68%	18	0.25%	9	0.13%	11	0.15%	149	2.10%	7,105
Boone	6,923	61.69%	4,234	37.73%	30	0.27%	14	0.12%	21	0.19%	2,689	23.96%	11,222
Brown	1,373	51.89%	1,267	47.88%	1	0.04%	3	0.11%	2	0.08%	106	4.01%	2,646
Bureau	8,896	54.41%	7,354	44.98%	42	0.26%	23	0.14%	36	0.22%	1,542	9.43%	16,351
Calhoun	1,238	44.37%	1,544	55.34%	2	0.07%	4	0.14%	2	0.07%	-306	-10.97%	2,790
Carroll	4,464	59.42%	2,990	39.80%	20	0.27%	24	0.32%	14	0.19%	1,474	19.62%	7,512
Cass	2,916	46.53%	3,316	52.91%	8	0.13%	8	0.13%	19	0.30%	-400	-6.38%	6,267
Champaign	33,247	52.36%	29,733	46.82%	264	0.42%	164	0.26%	91	0.14%	3,514	5.54%	63,499
Christian	7,040	45.61%	8,295	53.74%	44	0.29%	23	0.15%	34	0.22%	-1,255	-8.13%	15,436
Clark	4,508	57.71%	3,275	41.93%	11	0.14%	9	0.12%	8	0.10%	1,233	15.78%	7,811
Clay	3,494	55.65%	2,761	43.97%	10	0.16%	5	0.08%	9	0.14%	733	11.68%	6,279
Clinton	7,681	56.15%	5,935	43.38%	27	0.20%	22	0.16%	15	0.11%	1,746	12.77%	13,680
Coles	11,043	56.62%	8,327	42.69%	58	0.30%	36	0.18%	40	0.21%	2,716	13.93%	19,504
Cook	878,582	43.36%	1,129,973	55.77%	7,776	0.38%	6,244	0.31%	3,569	0.18%	-251,391	-12.41%	2,026,144
Crawford	4,951	57.76%	3,555	41.48%	32	0.37%	19	0.22%	14	0.16%	1,396	16.28%	8,571
Cumberland	2,667	57.98%	1,904	41.39%	9	0.20%	8	0.17%	12	0.26%	763	16.59%	4,600
DeKalb	17,182	58.86%	11,811	40.46%	122	0.42%	37	0.13%	38	0.13%	5,371	18.40%	29,190
DeWitt	3,942	59.32%	2,660	40.03%	22	0.33%	12	0.18%	9	0.14%	1,282	19.29%	6,645
Douglas	4,378	57.62%	3,184	41.91%	9	0.12%	8	0.11%	19	0.25%	1,194	15.71%	7,598
DuPage	217,907	69.39%	94,285	30.02%	1,180	0.38%	360	0.11%	322	0.10%	123,622	39.37%	314,054
Edgar	5,538	58.55%	3,880	41.02%	19	0.20%	10	0.11%	12	0.13%	1,658	17.53%	9,459
Edwards	2,212	64.12%	1,218	35.30%	5	0.14%	9	0.26%	6	0.17%	994	28.82%	3,450
Effingham	8,431	64.53%	4,553	34.85%	38	0.29%	18	0.14%	26	0.20%	3,878	29.68%	13,066
Fayette	5,452	53.88%	4,632	45.78%	15	0.15%	10	0.10%	9	0.09%	820	8.10%	10,118
Ford	4,059	66.05%	2,026	32.97%	22	0.36%	20	0.33%	18	0.29%	2,033	33.08%	6,145
Franklin	7,677	40.87%	11,023	58.69%	34	0.18%	26	0.14%	23	0.12%	-3,346	-17.82%	18,783
Fulton	6,999	43.45%	9,046	56.16%	24	0.15%	22	0.14%	17	0.11%	-2,047	-12.71%	16,108
Gallatin	1,580	38.89%	2,455	60.42%	8	0.20%	9	0.22%	11	0.27%	-875	-21.53%	4,063
Greene	3,136	50.56%	3,020	48.69%	15	0.24%	16	0.26%	16	0.26%	116	1.87%	6,203
Grundy	8,743	60.88%	5,525	38.47%	41	0.29%	22	0.15%	30	0.21%	3,218	22.41%	14,361
Hamilton	2,622	49.89%	2,618	49.81%	5	0.10%	8	0.15%	3	0.06%	4	0.08%	5,256
Hancock	4,568	48.71%	4,740	50.54%	37	0.39%	16	0.17%	17	0.18%	-172	-1.83%	9,378
Hardin	1,504	53.26%	1,308	46.32%	3	0.11%	2	0.07%	7	0.25%	196	6.94%	2,824
Henderson	1,726	45.17%	2,085	54.57%	5	0.13%	1	0.03%	4	0.10%	-359	-9.40%	3,821
Henry	11,358	49.28%	11,594	50.30%	45	0.20%	23	0.10%	28	0.12%	-236	-1.02%	23,048
Iroquois	9,596	69.11%	4,221	30.40%	24	0.17%	21	0.15%	24	0.17%	5,375	38.71%	13,886
Jackson	9,687	45.73%	11,334	53.50%	81	0.38%	54	0.25%	29	0.14%	-1,647	-7.77%	21,185
Jasper	3,024	58.28%	2,135	41.14%	15	0.29%	5	0.10%	10	0.19%	889	17.14%	5,189
Jefferson	7,624	49.42%	7,729	50.10%	34	0.22%	18	0.12%	21	0.14%	-105	-0.68%	15,426
Jersey	4,343	49.62%	4,376	50.00%	15	0.17%	6	0.07%	12	0.14%	-33	-0.38%	8,752
Jo Daviess	4,923	53.88%	4,141	45.32%	40	0.44%	17	0.19%	16	0.18%	782	8.56%	9,137
Johnson	2,797	59.61%	1,872	39.90%	8	0.17%	11	0.23%	4	0.09%	925	19.71%	4,692
Kane	66,283	64.10%	36,366	35.17%	432	0.42%	170	0.16%	161	0.16%	29,917	28.93%	103,412
Kankakee	20,316	56.82%	15,147	42.36%	55	0.15%	202	0.56%	35	0.10%	5,169	14.46%	35,755
Kendall	10,653	70.62%	4,347	28.82%	39	0.26%	26	0.17%	19	0.13%	6,306	41.80%	15,084
Knox	10,842	45.75%	12,752	53.81%	44	0.19%	31	0.13%	31	0.13%	-1,910	-8.06%	23,700
Lake	114,115	63.53%	64,327	35.81%	709	0.39%	287	0.16%	195	0.11%	49,788	27.72%	179,633
LaSalle	22,166	49.64%	22,271	49.88%	89	0.20%	59	0.13%	65	0.15%	-105	-0.24%	44,650
Lawrence	3,655	53.57%	3,140	46.02%	9	0.13%	10	0.15%	9	0.13%	515	7.55%	6,823
Lee	8,903	65.48%	4,608	33.89%	38	0.28%	25	0.18%	22	0.16%	4,295	31.59%	13,596
Livingston	10,324	67.02%	5,009	32.52%	37	0.24%	18	0.12%	17	0.11%	5,315	34.50%	15,405
Logan	8,490	63.90%	4,727	35.58%	33	0.25%	15	0.11%	21	0.16%	3,763	28.32%	13,286
Macon	23,862	48.22%	25,364	51.25%	132	0.27%	66	0.13%	65	0.13%	-1,502	-3.03%	49,489
Macoupin	9,362	43.20%	12,195	56.28%	50	0.23%	30	0.14%	32	0.15%	-2,833	-13.08%	21,669
Madison	44,907	45.04%	54,175	54.34%	268	0.27%	219	0.22%	126	0.13%	-9,268	-9.30%	99,695
Marion	8,695	50.05%	8,592	49.46%	35	0.20%	24	0.14%	27	0.16%	103	0.59%	17,373
Marshall	3,588	56.35%	2,742	43.07%	21	0.33%	6	0.09%	10	0.16%	846	13.28%	6,367
Mason	3,424	49.95%	3,406	49.69%	8	0.12%	5	0.07%	12	0.18%	18	0.26%	6,855
Massac	3,507	51.86%	3,227	47.72%	5	0.07%	18	0.27%	6	0.09%	280	4.14%	6,763
McDonough	7,173	57.42%	5,247	42.00%	28	0.22%	26	0.21%	19	0.15%	1,926	15.42%	12,493
McHenry	46,135	70.44%	18,919	28.88%	251	0.38%	81	0.12%	113	0.17%	27,216	41.56%	65,499
McLean	30,572	61.75%	18,659	37.69%	117	0.24%	99	0.20%	64	0.13%	11,913	24.06%	49,511
Menard	3,560	62.40%	2,103	36.86%	19	0.33%	17	0.30%	6	0.11%	1,457	25.54%	5,705
Mercer	3,683	46.45%	4,204	53.02%	18	0.23%	9	0.11%	15	0.19%	-521	-6.57%	7,929
Monroe	6,275	57.83%	4,529	41.74%	18	0.17%	13	0.12%	16	0.15%	1,746	16.09%	10,851
Montgomery	6,388	46.43%	7,293	53.01%	40	0.29%	17	0.12%	21	0.15%	-905	-6.58%	13,759
Morgan	8,808	59.17%	6,032	40.52%	29	0.19%	8	0.05%	9	0.06%	2,776	18.65%	14,886
Moultrie	3,167	50.98%	3,013	48.50%	14	0.23%	6	0.10%	12	0.19%	154	2.48%	6,212
Ogle	11,644	66.94%	5,641	32.43%	61	0.35%	25	0.14%	23	0.13%	6,003	34.51%	17,394
Peoria	37,605	51.35%	35,253	48.14%	172	0.23%	117	0.16%	83	0.11%	2,352	3.21%	73,230
Perry	4,576	46.78%	5,167	52.83%	9	0.09%	13	0.13%	16	0.16%	-591	-6.05%	9,781
Piatt	4,137	56.85%	3,099	42.59%	15	0.21%	12	0.16%	14	0.19%	1,038	14.26%	7,277
Pike	3,965	46.11%	4,614	53.66%	13	0.15%	6	0.07%	1	0.01%	-649	-7.55%	8,599
Pope	1,202	54.44%	996	45.11%	5	0.23%	2	0.09%	3	0.14%	206	9.33%	2,208
Pulaski	1,666	47.90%	1,793	51.55%	5	0.14%	12	0.35%	2	0.06%	-127	-3.65%	3,478
Putnam	1,516	48.30%	1,601	51.00%	6	0.19%	6	0.19%	10	0.32%	-85	-2.70%	3,139
Randolph	7,396	48.28%	7,844	51.21%	31	0.20%	27	0.18%	20	0.13%	-448	-2.93%	15,318
Richland	4,264	59.61%	2,863	40.03%	9	0.13%	9	0.13%	8	0.11%	1,401	19.58%	7,153
Rock Island	27,412	40.37%	40,174	59.17%	155	0.23%	70	0.10%	90	0.13%	-12,762	-18.80%	67,901
Saline	5,798	46.31%	6,676	53.32%	17	0.14%	12	0.10%	18	0.14%	-878	-7.01%	12,521
Sangamon	50,175	56.76%	37,729	42.68%	228	0.26%	146	0.17%	125	0.14%	12,446	14.08%	88,403
Schuyler	2,178	53.57%	1,866	45.89%	7	0.17%	7	0.17%	8	0.20%	312	7.68%	4,066
Scott	1,535	55.02%	1,243	44.55%	4	0.14%	4	0.14%	4	0.14%	292	10.47%	2,790
Shelby	5,370	53.28%	4,650	46.14%	19	0.19%	15	0.15%	24	0.24%	720	7.14%	10,078
St. Clair	41,439	42.58%	55,465	57.00%	180	0.18%	133	0.14%	96	0.10%	-14,026	-14.42%	97,313
Stark	1,841	58.39%	1,274	40.41%	19	0.60%	9	0.29%	10	0.32%	567	17.98%	3,153
Stephenson	11,342	59.87%	7,460	39.38%	74	0.39%	39	0.21%	30	0.16%	3,882	20.49%	18,945
Tazewell	28,861	53.72%	24,603	45.79%	119	0.22%	69	0.13%	75	0.14%	4,258	7.93%	53,727
Union	4,244	50.05%	4,197	49.50%	18	0.21%	7	0.08%	13	0.15%	47	0.55%	8,479
Vermilion	16,943	48.32%	17,918	51.10%	75	0.21%	67	0.19%	64	0.18%	-975	-2.78%	35,067
Wabash	3,453	60.30%	2,241	39.14%	12	0.21%	8	0.14%	12	0.21%	1,212	21.16%	5,726
Warren	4,584	55.54%	3,617	43.82%	18	0.22%	22	0.27%	13	0.16%	967	11.72%	8,254
Washington	4,127	60.04%	2,689	39.12%	18	0.26%	25	0.36%	15	0.22%	1,438	20.92%	6,874
Wayne	5,481	63.29%	3,135	36.20%	11	0.13%	10	0.12%	23	0.27%	2,346	27.09%	8,660
White	4,354	51.04%	4,144	48.58%	13	0.15%	7	0.08%	13	0.15%	210	2.46%	8,531
Whiteside	12,978	53.05%	11,328	46.31%	74	0.30%	37	0.15%	45	0.18%	1,650	6.74%	24,462
Will	73,129	59.10%	49,816	40.26%	363	0.29%	259	0.21%	164	0.13%	23,313	18.84%	123,731
Williamson	12,274	48.84%	12,712	50.58%	58	0.23%	62	0.25%	24	0.10%	-438	-1.74%	25,130
Winnebago	55,699	54.69%	45,280	44.46%	568	0.56%	137	0.13%	166	0.16%	10,419	10.23%	101,850
Woodford	9,474	66.93%	4,604	32.53%	44	0.31%	13	0.09%	20	0.14%	4,870	34.40%	14,155
Totals	2,310,939	50.69%	2,215,940	48.60%	14,944	0.33%	10,276	0.23%	7,021	0.15%	94,999	2.09%	4,559,120

==== Counties that flipped from Republican to Democratic ====
- Calhoun
- Cass
- Christian
- Fulton
- Hancock
- Henderson
- Henry
- Jackson
- Jefferson
- Jersey
- Knox
- LaSalle
- Macon
- Macoupin
- Madison
- Mercer
- Montgomery
- Perry
- Pike
- Pulaski
- Putnam
- Randolph
- Saline
- Vermilion
- Williamson

== See also ==
- Presidency of George H. W. Bush
- United States presidential elections in Illinois
