= Senator Shaw =

Senator Shaw may refer to:

- B. L. Shaw (1933–2018), Louisiana State Senate
- Elizabeth Orr Shaw (1923–2014), Iowa State Senate
- Henry Shaw (Massachusetts politician) (1788–1857), Massachusetts
- Larry Shaw (politician) (fl. 1990s–2010s), North Carolina State Senate
- Lemuel Shaw (1781–1861), Massachusetts State Senate
- Robert Shaw (Ohio politician) (1904–1985), Ohio State Senate
- Wayne Shaw (politician), Oklahoma State Senate
- William Shaw (Illinois politician) (1937–2008), Illinois State Senate
- Willis R. Shaw (1860–1933), Illinois State Senate
