= Senator Houser =

Senator Houser may refer to:

- Hubert Houser (born 1942), Iowa State Senate
- Paul W. Houser (1879–1942), Washington State Senate
