= Nicole Abusharif =

American woman convicted of murder

- Born: September 14, 1980 (age 46); Chicago, Illinois, U.S.
- Spouse: Rebecca Klein (2001-2007; deceased)
- Status: Incarcerated
- Conviction: First degree murder
- Penalty: 50 years imprisonment

Details
- Imprisoned at: Logan Correctional Center

Nicole M. Abusharif (born September 14, 1980) is an American woman, convicted of the 2007 Villa Park, Illinois murder of her domestic partner, Rebecca "Becky" Klein. After being found guilty of first-degree murder in May 2009, Abusharif was sentenced to 50 years in prison at the Dwight Correctional Center in Nevada Township, Illinois. The case made national news because of the intrigue of a "lesbian love triangle" murder.

== Victim ==
Rebecca Lyn Klein (born April 4, 1974) was born in Chicago. She attended Streamwood High School, and graduated from Illinois State University.

== Murder and investigation ==
On March 17, 2007, the body of Klein was discovered in the trunk of her 1966 Ford Mustang, after Klein's domestic partner of seven years, Abusharif, reported her missing. Klein was found bound with duct tape, gagged with a bandana, blindfolded, and suffocated with a plastic bag over her head. Four days later, Abusharif was charged with first-degree murder and concealing of a homicide.

Villa Park police officers believe that Abusharif killed Klein on March 15, 2007, two days before her body was found. After Abusharif allegedly suffocated Klein to death, she went out with another woman, the 19-year-old Rose Sodaro, she met on the social networking site MySpace. That night, Abusharif and Sodaro went bowling in Tinley Park and returned to Abusharif's home. Rose believed that Klein was Abusharif's roommate, not her life partner.

In addition to her relationship with Sodaro, police also believe that Abusharif was motivated to kill Klein by a $400,000 insurance payout. Forensic scientists found fingerprints on the duct tape and plastic bag belonging to Abusharif and her DNA on the bandana. Prosecutors also uncovered a slew of lies that Abusharif allegedly told, including stating to Sodaro that she had been a New York City firefighter during the September 11, 2001 attacks. Abusharif, who was also an alcoholic, claimed to have liver cancer and told Sodaro that her alcoholism would lead to her death. Abusharif also took Sodaro to a funeral home, where she dramatically selected her own casket.

During the police's investigation into the murder of Klein, Abusharif's coworker at a Des Plaines security company, Robert L. Edwards, was charged with five counts of obstructing justice for allegedly lying about his whereabouts when Klein was believed to have been murdered. Police focused on Edwards during their initial investigation because he was at Abusharif and Klein's residence on March 16, 2007, during the search for Klein. He later admitted to police that he and Abusharif were "drug buddies who shared wild sex fantasies." Initially, Edwards was on a $1 million bail, which was later reduced to $500,000.

After being indicted on first-degree murder charges, Abusharif was held at the DuPage County Jail on $3 million bond, later lowered to $1 million. After bonding out of jail, Abusharif was put on home confinement in her Oak Lawn apartment. However, on April 25, 2008, Abusharif violated her bail by leaving her apartment to visit a family member's home next door.

Although, Assistant State's Attorney Joseph Ruggiero applied to have Abusharif's bail revoked, her bail was only increased by $100,000. She returned to county jail but was back out on bail before her trial began.

== Trials ==
In November 2008, Edwards went to trial on charges of obstructing justice. Villa Park police still believed he was not involved in Becky Klein's murder, but he was convicted of the obstruction charges and was sentenced to 75 days at the DuPage County, Illinois work camp.

Abusharif's jury trial commenced on April 20, 2009. Edwards did not testify for the prosecution, but Sodaro did so and was joined by many members of Klein's family. Abusharif also testified in her own defense. When confronted with the evidence against her, she admitted lying during the police investigation. The defense hinged on whether Abusharif would have been physically able to kill Klein. Abusharif's defense attorneys, Bob Parchem and Dennis Sopata, maintained that Abusharif had a bad back and would not have been able to subdue Klein, who weighed 40 pounds more than she did. While Abusharif's attorneys were skeptical of gaining an acquittal, they were able to prove that Klein's murder was not "cold, calculated and premeditated," as the prosecution requested. That eliminated the possibility for a sentence of life in prison without parole.

== Verdict and aftermath ==
On May 5, 2009, Abusharif was convicted of first-degree murder in the death of Klein after 13 hours of jury deliberation. She faced up to 60 years in prison, but Judge John Kinsella sentenced Abusharif to 50 years of incarceration. She will have to serve all of her sentence before being eligible for parole, at the age of 76.

Abusharif's conviction was affirmed by the Second District of the Illinois Appellate Court on March 4, 2011. She is currently held at Logan Correctional Center

== Media ==
Abusharif's case has been covered on various true crime television documentary programs. In 2021, it was featured on Deadly Women as the third case of the episode "Lethal Lies." It was also featured on Lifetime Movie Network's Wicked Wives. The story also appeared on Snapped, serving as the subject of the fifteenth episode of the show's ninth season.

== See also ==
- List of homicides in Illinois
