= Edward R. Madigan State Fish and Wildlife Area =

Conservation area in Logan County, Illinois

- IUCN category IV (habitat/species management area)
- Location within Illinois Location within the United States
- Location: Logan County, Illinois, United States
- Nearest city: Lincoln, Illinois
- Coordinates: 40°07′00″N 89°23′30″W
- Area: 974 acres (394 ha)
- Established: 1971
- Governing body: Illinois Department of Natural Resources

The Edward R. Madigan State Fish and Wildlife Area is a 974-acre (394 ha) conservation area located in the U.S. state of Illinois. It is located south of Lincoln, Illinois. Founded in 1971 as Railsplitter State Park, it was renamed in 1995 in honor of Edward R. Madigan, a former member of the U.S. House of Representatives from the town of Lincoln and a U.S. Secretary of Agriculture. The park is operated by the Illinois Department of Natural Resources (IDNR).

The horseshoe-shaped park surrounds the Lincoln Correctional Center/Logan Correctional Center, a complex of state facilities operated by the Illinois Department of Corrections. One of the park's primary assets is a 2.5-mile (4 km) section of Salt Creek, a major tributary of central Illinois' Sangamon River.

== Park resources ==
=== Birds ===
Edward R. Madigan is a principal pheasant hatchery for IDNR, producing 80,000 to 100,000 hatchlings annually. Upland birds hunted at Madigan include pheasants, doves, and quail.

=== Fish ===
DNR stated in 2006 that Salt Creek contained largemouth bass, smallmouth bass, bluegill, sunfish, crappie, drum, channel catfish, bullhead, and carp. The bluegill is the state fish of Illinois. Drum has also been caught here. Canoeing. and kayaking in Salt Creek are allowed during the daytime.

=== Trees ===
Trails totaling 7.75 miles (12 km) wind through wooded areas. The Madigan Salt Creek bottomlands contain one of Illinois's largest American sycamore trees. Outside the creek bed, the conservation area contains several groves of white oak and hickory, typical of central Illinois. The white oak is the state tree of Illinois. The state park also contains ash, hackberry, and black walnut trees. A herd of 100-150 deer graze the trees and brush.

== Access and historic road ==
Old U.S. Highway 66, now Interstate Business 55, passes through the Madigan State Fish and Wildlife Area.

The nearest limited-access exit to the Madigan State Fish and Wildlife Area is exit 123 on Interstate 55, where Business 55 intersects with Interstate 55.
