= William D. Gayle =

American businessman and politician

Member of the Illinois House of Representatives
- In office 1933–1934

Personal details
- Born: William Drury Gayle; August 25, 1859 Broadwell Township, Logan County, Illinois, U.S.
- Died: March 4, 1939 (aged 79) Lincoln, Illinois, U.S.
- Party: Democratic
- Occupation: Politician, businessman

William Drury Gayle (August 25, 1859 – March 4, 1939) was an American businessman and politician.

Gayle was born near Lincoln, Illinois in Broadwell Township. He was, after 1890, the owner of the Lincoln Monument Company in Lincoln, Illinois. He served on the Lincoln City Council and as Mayor of Lincoln and also served on the school board. He was a Democrat. He served on the Logan County Board of Review, as the deputy county collector, and in the Illinois House of Representatives in 1933 and 1934. He died at St. Clara Hospital in Lincoln, Illinois after suffering a heart attack at the Lincoln Elk's Club.
