= Quisenberry =

Quisenberry is a surname. Notable people with the surname include:

- Clifford Quisenberry (1878–1916), American farmer and politician
- Dan Quisenberry (1953–1998), American baseball player

== See also ==
- Quessenberry, surname
