= Murder of Adrianne Reynolds =

2005 murder of teenager in Illinois, US

Adrianne Leigh Reynolds
- Born: September 12, 1988; Kilgore, Texas, U.S.
- Died: January 21, 2005 (aged 16); Moline, Illinois, U.S.
- Cause of death: Homicide by strangulation

The murder of East Moline, Illinois, teenager Adrianne Leigh Reynolds made national headlines. She was beaten, strangled, burned, and dismembered by her classmates Sarah Anne Kolb and Cory Gregory on January 21, 2005.

== People involved ==
=== Victim ===
- Adrianne Reynolds was originally from Kilgore, Texas. She moved to East Moline, Illinois, when she was 16 to live with her grandfather and step-grandmother, Tony and Joann Reynolds. She began attending Black Hawk College Outreach Center in November 2004 to earn her GED so she could realize her dream of joining the Marines. While there, she met fellow students Sarah Kolb and Cory Gregory.

=== Perpetrators ===
- Sarah Kolb was reportedly a popular girl at the Outreach Center. She lived with her mother and stepfather in the nearby town of Milan, Illinois. When Adrianne started in the school, she befriended Sarah's former boyfriend and current best friend Cory Gregory.
- Cory Gregory originally attended Moline High School but later transferred to the Outreach Center, where he met Sarah. He lived with his mother at the time of the incident. In January 2005, Adrianne reportedly asked Cory out, which allegedly angered Sarah.

== Murder ==
On the afternoon of January 21, 2005, Sarah invited Adrianne to join her, Cory, and another friend Sean McKitrick for lunch at Taco Bell; When they arrived there, Sarah and Adrianne reportedly began fighting, Sean told Sarah to stop but she told him if he didn't like it then he should leave, and he immediately left. In the parking lot of Taco Bell, Sarah began strangling Adrianne, while Cory finished the strangling using a belt.

After the murder, Sarah and Cory took Adrianne's body to Sarah's grandparents' farm in Aledo, Illinois, where they tried to burn it with gasoline. When it failed to burn after several hours, they recruited Nathan Gaudet, a 16-year-old boy from Moline, to help dismember the body. Nathan used his grandfather's handsaw to remove Adrianne's head and arms and placed them in a garbage bag. The three teenagers ate lunch at McDonald's, then later disposed of the garbage bag at the Black Hawk State Historic Site.

Adrianne's parents reported her missing after she failed to show up to work at a nearby Checkers restaurant. Authorities were led to Adrianne's remains a few days later on January 26, 2005, by Cory Gregory.

== Arrests and trials ==
Sarah Kolb and Cory Gregory were both charged with two counts of first-degree murder and concealment of a homicide on February 1, 2005; they both pleaded not guilty.

Sarah was the first to go to trial, which began on October 31, 2005, at the Rock Island County Courthouse. After two weeks of trial and 15 hours of deliberation, the trial jury was unable to reach a unanimous verdict on any of the three charges. The hung jury resulted in a mistrial. One juror opted for acquittal, while eleven were in favor of conviction.

At her retrial on February 6, 2006, in Dixon, Illinois, Sarah was convicted on all counts. At her sentencing a few months later, she was sentenced to 48 years in prison for murder and 5 years for concealment. These sentences were to be served consecutively, for a total of 53 years incarcerated. She is serving her sentence at the Logan Correctional Center.

In the meantime, Cory Gregory pleaded guilty to all charges against him. On July 10, 2006, he was sentenced to 40 years in prison for murder and 5 years for concealment, resulting in a 45-year prison term. According to the Illinois Department of Corrections, he is serving his sentence at the Pontiac Correctional Center.

Nathan Gaudet was also charged with concealment for helping to dismember Adrianne. He pleaded guilty and was given a juvenile sentence of five years. He was released from juvenile detention on November 11, 2008, after serving almost four years. On April 16, 2012, he died in an automobile crash in Indiana.

== Media coverage ==
This case has been discussed or portrayed on Dateline NBC in October 2006; Deadly Women in December 2010; E! Investigates in June 2011; Snapped in September 2011, and I Killed My BFF on LMN in August 2013. On November 9, 2020, the podcast Crime Junkie released an hour long episode detailing the case. It was discussed on the November 28, 2018, episode of Morbid: A True Crime Podcast. On March 2, 2022, it was featured on the Crimes of Passion podcast. On September 26, 2021, the case was addressed on the Murder with My Husband podcast.
