= Paul W. Houser =

American politician

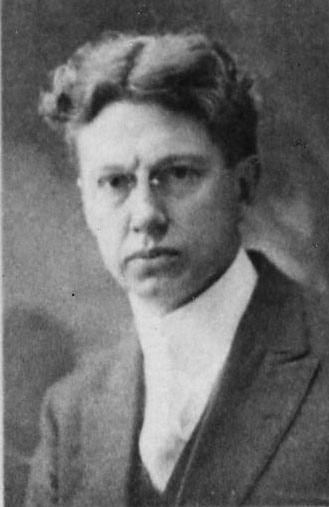
- Houser in 1917

Member of the Washington House of Representatives for the 41st district
- In office 1913–1923

Member of the Washington State Senate for the 31st district
- In office 1923–1935

Personal details
- Born: January 12, 1879 Lincoln, Illinois, United States
- Died: June 17, 1942 (aged 63) Seattle, Washington, United States
- Party: Republican

Paul Willard Houser (January 12, 1879 – June 17, 1942) was an American politician in the state of Washington. He served in the Washington House of Representatives and Washington State Senate.
