= Dwight Correctional Center =

Prison for women in Illinois, United States

Coordinates: 41°05′51″N 88°28′34″W

- Interactive map of Dwight Correctional Center
- Location: 23813 E. 3200 North Road 3 Nevada Township, Livingston County, Illinois
- Status: closed
- Opened: 1930
- Closed: 2013
- Managed by: Illinois Department of Corrections

Dwight Correctional Center (DCC), also known as Oakdale Reformatory for Women, and Illinois Penitentiary for Women at Dwight, was a women's prison in Livingston County, Illinois, United States, outside the village of Dwight, Illinois. It operated from 1930 to 2013.

It was established in 1930 as the Oakdale Reformatory for Women. Over the course of its 83 years the reformatory maintained a commitment to the concept of rehabilitating felons and misdemeanants for positive and productive re-entry into society. Adaptations were made and experiments conducted as inmate populations and changing conditions required.

The facility was closed in 2013 as the State of Illinois sought to balance its budget. At that time it was the only maximum security prison for adult females in the Illinois Department of Corrections (IDOC), inclusive of women on death row until the death penalty was abolished in Illinois in 2011. The name "Oakdale Reformatory for Women" fell out of common usage in the early 1970s when the IDOC's co-ed experiment began. The DCC was also occasionally referred to by other names, including Dwight Reformatory and Illinois Penitentiary for Women at Dwight. The facility is located at 23813 E. 3200 North Road in Nevada Township, unincorporated Livingston County, Illinois.

== 1930 – Establishment ==
Interest in a reformed penal system for women arose as early as 1914 among women's service and advocacy groups in Illinois. In 1919 legislation was passed by the Illinois Senate and House of Representatives that would establish "a State sanitarium for females above the age eighteen", but no funding was provided at that time. Proponents of the women's reformatory attempted for several years following to obtain an appropriation, but failed. In 1925 twelve state women's organizations representing 300,000 women formed the Illinois Women's Joint Legislative Council and State Committee on an Illinois Reformatory for Women, which succeeded in securing $300,000 and begin building. At its founding the reformatory joined 22 other states in The United States which had separate reform facilities for women.

=== Building of the reformatory ===
Once funding was secured, a location was identified for the new reformatory, and architects were engaged. The reformatory was located 75 miles south of Chicago on a 160-acre tract of farmland and forest about two miles outside of the city of Dwight, Illinois, which was easily accessed from Route 66, now Interstate 55. The buildings were constructed of yellow brick and stone and were architecturally of a French Norman style and set amid oaks and spruces. The administration building had slate roofs and full brass front doors. At the time of the dedication in 1930 there were eight cottages, as well as administration, industrial, service, and farm buildings. An easily climbed wire fence surrounded the whole tract, but served "merely to indicate the boundary lines of the reformatory property".

The whole facility was at various times compared to a "swank country club", an ivy-league campus, "a noble experiment", "a monument to a handful of Illinois club women who fought for it for ten years", "the rich park of some multimillionaire", a "monument to crime", a monument to the belief "that in time crime can be abolished", and in 1976, "a monument to the Women's liberation movement". The administration building was described as "something of a gentleman's estate in old England and a fraternity house in America".

=== Aims of reform ===
At the dedication of the reformatory in 1930, the Superintendent of Prisons of the State of Illinois, Frank D. Whipp, stated that the program of reform would include training in "useful trades", including "domestic science, light forms of agriculture, and stock raising..." with the goal of "returning unfortunate girls and women to society, clean, healthful, and with character reconstructed."

The founders of Oakdale Reformatory for Women described their task to be "the uplift of the unfortunate". Staff members were needed who could "understand fundamental causes, who can look at a storm and see something more than thunder and lightning, look into a mud puddle and see something more than filth, who can take the hand of a forger and read more than a name other than her own, look into the eyes of a murderess and see more than a knife, gun or bottle; who can understand something of the emotions of the homo-sexualist or open violations of sex sanity, and detect more than licentiousness or prostitution." The governor of the state, at the facility's dedication, stated that the reformatory was "a far cry from the days of the rack and thumb screw". Staff members of the reformatory were to be people who would say to parolees, "Go thy way, and sin no more." Workers were expected to follow the inmate through her period of incarceration and to prepare her for release.

The cornerstone of the Oakdale Reformatory for Women was laid and the facility formally dedicated on November 19, 1931, by Illinois Governor Louis L. Emmerson. In his address to the gathering, the governor reported that the structure being dedicated was built by the state at a cost of $850,000, with an additional $150,000 expected at that time to be spent on a "semi-security unit". He stated that the institution was not "a Sunday School" and that discipline would be maintained. "It must be fair and just, but firm" and inmates would need to earn liberties available to them. Helen Hazard, a woman educated and experienced in penal systems, was hired to be its first superintendent.

== 1930–1950 Helen Hazard's superintendence ==
Helen Hazard earned her Bachelor's and master's degrees at Columbia University in New York City. She spent time in England and on continental Europe studying penal systems for women, and previously served as superintendent of the Niantic, Connecticut, reformatory for women and assistant superintendent of the Alderson, West Virginia, institution for women. She began her duties at Oakdale on March 15, 1930, while the reformatory was still under construction so that she might bring a program perspective to the building.

On November 24, 1930, Oakdale Reformatory received its first inmates. The initial plan was to receive only first offenders and women between the ages of 18 and 25, but within four years the institution had opened its program to any woman who had committed any crime. The population swelled when women incarcerated at the women's prison at Joliet were transferred to DCC, joining the nearly 600 women who had resided there up to that time.

=== The cottage model ===
Inmates were assigned to the eight cottages, each of which housed 15 to 28 women. Each cottage included a kitchen, living room, lavatory, shower, and sleeping quarters, which were secured at night. Each inmate had her own bedroom furnished with a bed with "deep springs and comfortable mattresses", a dresser, rocking chair, and closet. Some furnishings were of wicker made by prisoners at Joliet. Each had a fireplace, as well as a piano and radio for entertainment, and each was staffed with a female warden. Only one cottage had bars, and it was used for inmates requiring discipline or identified as needing higher security. It also included a hospital section where new inmates would receive orientation and undergo medical, psychiatric and psychological evaluations before being admitted to the general population. The hospital was reputed to offer excellent service to prisoners.

=== Security ===
Entrance to the facility was neither guarded nor closed during the day, and inmates were locked in their bedrooms at night. Guards on campus were said to have been posted "to keep visitors out rather than inmates in".

Security instead consisted of a system of tracking the women's movements around the campus according to the time it would take to pass between a point of departure and a destination. If an inmate did not arrive within the time allowed, an alarm would be raised. Freedom of movement depended on a system of merits and demerits, which also impacted the length of the woman's sentence. The trusted inmates were designated outwardly by their white stockings. Those who had not earned trust wore black stockings and had to be accompanied at all times by a white-stockinged inmate. Serious violations resulted in solitary confinement for a limited time and a diet of bread and water.

=== The reformation program ===
The reformatory also assigned each inmate a job that contributed to the maintenance and quality of the facility and community. In the cottages inmates were expected to keep their own and shared space clean. They took turns setting tables in the dining room and preparing meals in the kitchens, which were equipped with modern appliances. It was anticipated that many of the skills gained in daily life could translate into a vocation upon release. Inmates were also assigned to field work where "the women labored as men." There was poultry work, which included the feeding of chickens and gathering of eggs. Some planted the gardens, plowed and harrowed, harvested crops, and even laid tiles for drainage. Some herded the sheep on the farm, and others took care of the grounds. The women sawed wood for their fireplaces. The laundry occupied many with washing and ironing of prison attire, bedding, and other linens.

Over 6% of the inmates at Oakdale were illiterate, and half of the women had under a "fifth grade intelligence rating". For these inmates the completion of an education was a full-time job. Women were expected to have at least a 6th grade education and urged to complete primary grades, and some were advanced to high school classes. Inmates also gained practical skills such as typing, stenography, stenciling, and use of Dictaphone. Those inmates assigned to the garment factory made all the clothes worn by women at DCC, as well as clothing for female inmates at other prisons. Within a few years American flags for other state institutions were made, as well as dresses, pajamas and other items for inmates being released. The long-range plan was that garment-making would be the main industry at Oakdale.

The reformation program also included recreation, which included parties, dancing, baseball, volleyball, and drama. A decade later the only sport was baseball, and that was in the summer only. In the winter the women read, sewed, or if behavior warranted, watched movies. Worship and Bible studies were provided according to inmate's choice of denomination. The program also included discussions in current events and lessons in etiquette.

In a report by the Osborne Association, Inc., of New York City in 1933, Dwight was identified among the best women's institutions in the country. The report stated that the management was progressive and constructive in programming. By 1934 Oakdale was considered a "model institution" by the National Reform Association.

=== The second decade ===
A decade into its operation the prison continued to base its program of reformation on kindness, but prison life was more restricted. All cottage windows and doors were equipped with bars discretely blended with the architecture. Armed guards were available, and an electric alarm system installed. Doors of rooms were fitted with peepholes to allow observation of the inmate while she was locked in her room. Ingoing and outgoing mail was censored, and frequency of visitations was based on the inmate's record of compliance. The inmates were under lock and key whenever they were in their rooms, which during the day amounted to no more than about 15 minutes. Inmates were classified according to merits and demerits and were given a hearing every 3–4 months to voice complaints and review classification. Infractions could result in solitary confinement, which was achieved by stripping their room of all furnishings except a mattress and feeding them only bread, water, coffee, and tea.

Resources continued to include balanced meals and personal freedoms with respect to clothing, hairstyle, and choice of occupation. Inmates had some income which could be spent in the commissary and on mail orders. Inmates were expected to contribute to the welfare of the community through daily work and to learn cooking, sewing, cleaning, and serving, as well as reading and writing. When women were released back into the community, the reformatory sent them out with $10, a suitcase, clothing, cost of travel to their destination, and work references.

After 13 years as superintendent, Hazard took leave of absence in August 1943 to join a women's branch of the military. Elizabeth Mann, a parole officer at Dwight, served as acting superintendent until 1946, when Hazard assumed her position once again. Hazard experienced a nervous breakdown in 1949 and resigned in 1950. O.H. Lewis, a former warden at the Pontiac (Illinois) Correctional Center, assumed the position of acting director until Doris Whitney of Detroit, Michigan, was appointed in July 1950.

== 1950–1953 Whitney's superintendence ==
Doris Whitney previously had been forced to resign as superintendent of the women's division at Detroit (MI) House of Corrections on August 15, 1949. Her supporters stated that it was a "political" issue relating to her decision not to hire the son of the superintendent. The Detroit superintendent cited poor performance. Eight months into her superintendence, at the end of March 1951, a state senate committee launched an investigation of conditions at the reformatory after hearing an increasing number of complaints and after the beating of a guard by an inmate known to be dangerous. Among charges were Whitney's frequent absences, lack of discipline, "lavish entertainment", a drinking party, and Whitney's frequent visits to a Pontiac tavern with "a man who had a strange accent". It was also reported that a car from New York belonging to a man was parked in the reformatory's garage. Further, Whitney's new program "glorified inmates too much, causing them to feel equal to the employees." One complainant reported that the whole community of Dwight was upset.

Whitney accepted responsibility for some of the disciplinary issues, stating that a program of education and rehabilitation had failed. She also stated that inmates were violent, and some were criminally insane. The facility was inadequate, and the staff was poorly trained. She said that two female guards were "feeble minded", some 60–70-year-old male guards were "incompetent and physically incapable of handling their jobs", and that one man was being cared for by the inmates themselves. None could be terminated because they were civil service employees. Another man, she stated, had "a mean tongue and he's a gossip". She said that she felt vulnerable because she was new to the position. The investigators reported their conclusions in May. They stated that the qualifications of the staff and superintendent would be investigated, that the inmates who were criminally insane would be moved to state hospitals, and that Whitney had not been in her position long enough to be judged. The committee also reported that problems at the reformatory had begun when Elizabeth Mann became acting superintendent at the time of Hazard's resignation in 1950, and employees, taking advantage of her inexperience, "began running the reformatory to suit themselves".

Many of the same complaints followed Whitney in the year ahead. There were charges of "mismanagement, favoritism, and neglect". Whitney was unavailable in the evenings and "a frequent patron of a roadhouse". The charge also said that there was tension at the reformatory and that a resolution was needed as soon as possible. Whitney was fired on January 28, 1953, and Helen Hazard was appointed the following day to take up the post again. Hazard again became ill and resigned in September. Mary Powers, the overseer of women in the Chicago police force, was then appointed to the position.

== 1954–1962 Ruth Biedermann's superintendence ==
=== Biedermann appointed ===
Mary Powers resigned due to health concerns on June 7, 1954, just 9 months after assuming the position. Ruth Biedermann, who since 1947 had served as head of the Police Women's and Matrons Division of the Chicago Police Department, was hired on July 26. Biedermann had been screened by a citizens group under the leadership of the John Howard Society. John C. McNamara, who had served as Assistant Superintendent of Prisons, was named acting superintendent at Dwight until the effective date of Biedermann's appointment.

Biedermann was given the task of improving the rehabilitation rate and of reducing costs. After a visit to the reformatory a year later, Governor William G. Stratton applauded the progress, noting improved and more economical housekeeping practices and food service, as well as a reduction in the per capita cost of inmates by nearly 40%. Increased recreational opportunities and an improved educational program contributed to "a feeling of promise" at the reformatory. Biedermann was credited with stepping up the educational program at Oakdale. Thirty-one inmates were enrolled in elementary courses and 46 in high school. Chicago City Junior College offered televised classes in social science, German, humanities, physical science, anthropology, and music appreciation.

Inmates who violated rules at the reformatory were punished in 7' by 11' isolation cells and fed water or milk and bread for the first two days. The assistant superintendent presided over a daily "court" where violations were reviewed and new classifications made. Inmates might be disciplined for failing to report to a location, talking and giggling all night, and not heeding staff warnings, One inmate received a ticket for "painting in the hospital and trying to talk to an inmate in quarantine." Inmates reported more "don'ts" than "dos".

=== Centralized facility needed ===
In 1957 the John Howard Association reported problems with overcrowding, inadequate facilities, and lagging morale. Biedermann noted that the reformatory had been built for less serious offenders. Habitual and serious offenders were sometimes placed in the same room as minor offenders. Double-celling the 28–30 women in each cottage stretched the adequacy of the two toilets and two showers in each cottage. Biedermann also cited double-celling as a contributor to homosexual practices. The John Howard report stated that the population was expected to continue to increase. Biedermann recommended a larger, centralized building to replace the cottage model.

In 1959 a bill was introduced to the state legislature to budget $1,200,000 for the centralized facility which would house and feed 200 inmates—the first new building on campus since 1933. The bill passed the Illinois House of Representatives, but failed in the Senate after Senator Everett M. Peters described Dwight as "the 'country club' of the state's penitentiary system".

=== Biedermann resigns ===
In February 1961 Biedermann fired Dwight psychologist, Albert E. Eller, for "conduct unbecoming a state employee, disrespect toward his superiors and the state penal system, and inefficiency." A former state criminologist stated that Eller was not a team player on the staff. Eller responded with the allegation that the system under Biedermann was "decadent", that Biederman's administration had "blood upon its hands" after the suicide of an inmate in isolation, and that Biedermann was "sick" and needed help. He testified at the hearing on October 30 that Dwight did not have the kind of human relationship program that promoted rehabilitation. He stated, "If a more human relationship were extended to prisoners, there would be less need for guns and tear gas in the towers." The sociologist at Dwight, Albert G. Lassuy, testified that Biedermann was "far too punitive". He also alleged negligence in the treatment of an inmate's broken jaw, which was not x-rayed or set for a month after the injury. About the same time a complaint was made to the local union that Biedermann's firing of a typist in October was intended to injure the union. The union came to the typist's defense. Biedermann resigned voluntarily on March 3, 1962.

== 1962–1973 Margaret Morrissey's superintendence ==
The Director of Public Safety, Joseph Ragen, sought an educator to head the prison, but after more than 20 interviews was unable to find a qualified person. Ragen appointed Margaret Morrissey, a clerk/typist at the Statesville prison near Joliet, whom Ragen described as strict and fair and having extensive administrative experience with both inmates and employees and the management of funds. Morrissey stated that her primary purpose would be to transform the women into law-abiding citizens with compassion, humor, and "a genuine smile." The state superintendent of prisons, H. W. McKnight, stepped in as acting superintendent until Morrissey took her post on July 1.

=== Reformation and education ===
In 1967 Morrissey reported to the Department of Public Safety that the education program included elementary, high school, and college work via television. In 1970 DCC, along with other IDOC prisons, competed in a special series of the Emmy-award-winning quiz show for high school students, "It's Academic." The IDOC believed it would impact the public's perception of inmates and prison reform. In the contest between DCC and Pontiac Correctional Center, Pontiac won, 440–120.

Inmates were vocationally trained in laundering, cooking, and clerical skills. In horticultural training the inmates learned flower-arranging, gardening, and landscaping, and in farming the management of poultry, sheep, hogs, cattle, and horses. Some inmates were trained in routine nursing care and lab technology, and others tape-recorded text books for the blind. One inmate learned Braille to transcribe materials. The reformatory offered moral guidance, counseling, and Alcoholics Anonymous meetings. St. Leonard's House of Chicago held sessions to assist inmates with their reentry into society.

A charm program, which had high appeal to inmates, included classes on posture, good manners, and self-care. Morrissey stated that it taught inmates to "respond to the inner urge to do the right thing" and produced in the inmates greater confidence when appearing before the parole board.

Sewing was the principal occupation, training and employing 100 women in beginning, advanced, single, and manifold classes. The inmate employees made a little money and were permitted to spend $10 per week of their pay.

=== Poor morale among inmates and staff ===
Morrissey inherited the issues with aging and inadequate facilities, as well as discontent among inmates and staff. In 1962, to address turnover and poor morale among staff members and to increase security, she reduced cottage worker's hours from 24-hour to 8-hour shifts. The local American Federation of State, County, and Municipal Employees, AFL-CIO, petitioned the Department of Public Safety for equal pay among male guards across the state after Joliet guards' salaries alone were raised by $50 per month. The union also requested that the salaries of female warders, whose starting pay was $100 less than male guards, be commensurate with the male guards'. Hollis McKnight, the Illinois state superintendent of prisons, vetoed the requests, citing funding limitations, the warder's different job descriptions, and the warders' need to call on male guards for help from time to time.

=== Aging facilities and dwindling population ===
When in fall 1966 DCC celebrated its 35th anniversary, officials announced a plan for a $1 million centralized building for dining, recreation, storage, a 40-bed living area, and some administrative offices. The cottages that a new facility would replace would be vacated and used for other purposes. The construction was expected to be complete in 1967.

In 1967 piecemeal repairs were made to some of the existing facilities, including the rehabilitation of a water storage tank. An investigation into state prisons in 1967 stated that at Dwight Reformatory the rooms of inmates, who were still living in the eight cottages, needed to be modernized.

As the 1960s drew to a close, Dwight reformatory, still the only female adult prison in Illinois, experienced a decline in inmate population to about 120 women, 200 fewer inmates than a decade before. The reduced number of inmates was attributed by those who worked closely with the system to the decrease in reporting crimes such as abortion and prostitution; the growing use of community-based drug programs; shorter, suspended, and probationary sentences; a greater sympathy for women by the judiciary; and a woman's lesser likelihood of committing violent crimes. A new IDOC code effective on January 1, 1973, however, boosted the population by admitting women having committed misdemeanors and who had been sentenced to more than 60 days, as well as women as young as 17.

=== 1973 – The John Howard report ===
In January 1972 the John Howard Society conducted a review of the Dwight Reformatory, still considered a medium-security facility. The report was published in the spring of 1973 and was based on interviews with inmates, whose stories told of an administration overly focused on "obedience, docility, and subservience". The prison watch-dog group stated that the reformatory was administered by "nineteenth century standards" and that women were suffering "profound psychological oppression".

The report stated that inmates were not allowed to "wave, whistle, or sing" when passing between buildings. They were watched in the shower and bathrooms. They were prohibited from entering another inmate's room, sit close to another in the dining room, or touch in any way because of administrative concerns over lesbian relationships. Inmates were locked in their rooms between 6:00 p.m. and 6:00 a.m. and had to use chamber pots in their rooms during those hours. The report also told of complaints by inmates of inadequate nutrition, and it observed that most staff members were "white, poorly educated, rural-oriented", and communicated racial biases in their administration of inmate rights and privileges. The Society also noted that the women were unable to pass the state licensing exam for beauty school even after 1500 hours of training, and inmates had inadequate medical, legal, and drug recovery services. There were no mental health resources at all. One inmate described the prison as "a living hell".

The report recommended the hiring of a superintendent who had professional training in penal system management. Margaret Morrissey resigned as superintendent in March, and the assistant superintendent, J. Wayne Algood, stepped in as interim until August 1, when a new superintendent, Robert Buchanan, assumed the permanent position. In the meantime, responding to the John Howard report, Algood stated that inmate complaints were either invalid or beyond his ability to solve, citing lack of funds as one reason certain grievances had not been addressed.

== 1973–1974 Robert Buchanan's superintendence ==
Buchanan stated that returning to a rehabilitative model was a priority, as was increasing the population to fill all beds. He lifted the "silence system", allowing talking and singing if inmates did not use obscenities. He allowed items that the previous warden had labeled contraband, including stuffed animals, toys, certain knickknacks, cosmetics, and jewelry. He reduced restrictions on the dress code and the excessiveness of the former administration's lesbianism-prevention program, stating that it got in the way of casual friendships. Abuse of privileges would be dealt with, he said, on a case-by-case basis. Buchanan stated that there was no need to punish all inmates for the infractions of a few. Infractions would be addressed by denying the inmate recreation time, or in serious cases, isolating the inmate for no more than 15 days. There would be no corporal punishment. He stated that inmates should be given the right to medical treatment, counseling, vocational development, and academic resources as provided for people on the outside and that his programs would be top-notch. Adjustments to the daily schedule allowed inmates to obtain education without giving up recreation, and greater freedom was given to moving around on campus. Buchanan did not agree, however, with the report's recommendation that headcounts should be taken less than five times daily, because of the increased freedom of the inmates. Buchanan also proposed to improve the rehabilitative climate and normalize life in the prison by making it co-ed and began transferring men from Vienna into DCC.

=== The all-male plan and objections ===
On January 22, 1974, the IDOC announced that the reformatory would become all-male. The plan would make the DCC a minimum security prison in order to reduce inmate populations in male maximum-security prisons and the complications from overcrowding. The transfer of men to the DCC was expected to begin by February 1, and the complete transfer of women to other facilities by March. Women needing maximum security would be relocated to the Cook County Correctional Center, and women eligible for work-release would be transferred to a new facility in Chicago with supervision twenty-four hours a day. The remaining females would be placed in a co-ed facility in Vienna, Illinois, a minimum-security prison. On February 14 the administration of the DDC extended a farewell to the female inmates with a steak and chicken dinner for 200 and a co-ed dance.

An objection to the plans for the women, particularly those to be transferred to the Cook County facility, was raised by the Dwight Task Force, a women's advocacy group. The task force stated that the decision showed "disregard" for female inmates. The Cook County jail had been built, they said, to hold persons awaiting trial, not for women needing long-term rehabilitation. On April 23 a civil rights action lawsuit was filed to block the transfer until the county institution had services and facilities equal to those at the DCC, including exercise areas indoors and outdoors, a library, educational programs, and privileges such as women being allowed to wear their own clothing. Citizens of Pontiac also objected to the change. After the meeting, Allyn R. Sielaff, Director of the IDOC, reversed his January decision to make the prison all-male and announced it would remain co-ed. No date was set for moving more men into the DCC.

On June 1, 1974, Buchanan was reassigned to serve as superintendent of the reception and diagnostic center of the IDOC. He was replaced by John Platt, who had served as superintendent of the Illinois Youth Center at Valley View since 1970. He was initially scheduled to serve as superintendent of the planned adult prison in Joliet, but was sent to the DCC when the plan for transferring women to other facilities fell through.

== 1974–1977 John Platt's superintendence ==
John Platt stated he planned to build on the work of Buchanan and was not trying "to run a dungeon". Personal responsibility would be nurtured by giving the inmates more freedom, resources, and choices. The inmates were permitted to decorate their rooms as they wanted. Many had cable television. All had plumbing. There were snack and laundry rooms, two bowling alleys, a place to roller skate, exercise equipment, and other indoor services. Profit from commissary products were routed to an inmate benefit fund. Cottages could keep dogs, and Avon even called, offering the inmates a 40% discount on products.

=== William W. Fox Developmental Center ===
In 1976 inmates were given the opportunity to sign up for volunteer work at the William W. Fox Developmental Center in Dwight. The women received 512 hours of instruction and upon completion of the course were qualified to take the state civil service examination. The inmates worked or studied full days five days a week and were deployed as other volunteers helping residents with personal hygiene and feeding. Inmates were sometimes motivated to participate initially by a desire to leave the Correctional Center campus, but in some cases found a vocation they planned to pursue after release. The IDOC compensated the women $17.00 a month for their work.

=== Inmate unrest ===
Despite improvements, the prison struggled to maintain an environment conducive to positive change. In July 1976 twenty-one women refused to be locked in their rooms and "began brandishing chairs and throwing bottles, ashtrays, and other objects at correctional center officers" because the administration had imposed a precautionary rule prohibiting the women from visiting between rooms. Tear gas forced the women outside and law enforcement officers were summoned. Some of the women were indicted in December on charges of aggravated battery. In September the chief guard, one of several male guards added when male inmates came, was fired after being observed by a female officer sexually abusing an inmate. Earlier in the year two female guards were fired because of kissing incidents. In the summer of 1977 two "rather petite inmates" who wanted to stay in the same cell beat their way through the brick wall between them, ripped sinks from the wall, broke windows, pulled a radiator out of the floor, tore up beds, and beat guards with a lead pipe. Several inmates were charged with aggravated battery and one an attempted murder of a guard with a guitar string. One was charged with biting an officer and another striking an officer with her purse. Fear of sexual assault by other inmates prompted one prisoner to escape.

=== All-male prison proposed and again abandoned ===
Early in 1977, a new Director of Corrections, Charles J. Rowe, revisited the idea of converting DCC into an all-male prison. As in 1974, the goal was to address overcrowding and consequential inmate conflicts in the male prisons. In this plan, women would be transferred to the Geneva Youth Center, which would be converted to confine adult females. Rowe stated that converting DCC to an all-male prison would also reduce incidents of inmate romances, which, though prohibited, had resulted in two pregnancies. The population of women needing incarceration was swelling, however, which made the rearrangement of prison populations impractical. By April Rowe abandoned the plan for an all-male population, but also proposed ending the co-ed "experiment".

== 1977–1979 Charlotte Sutliff's superintendence ==
In June 1977, less than a year after taking the position at DCC, John Platt was reassigned to another post. Charlotte Sutliff, who had been trained in corrections and had previously served as the superintendent of the DuPage Youth Center, was appointed in his place. Sutliff stated that she planned to involve more people in decision-making because it promoted greater responsibility. She said, also, that she planned to construct two 50-unit residences and a new recreation center within two years and rejuvenate the existing buildings. She would continue her predecessor's programs, add more leisure time activities, and increase the population in the reformatory to its capacity. At the time of Sutliff's arrival the co-ed "experiment" was ended. By mid-June the remaining women at the Vienna Correctional Center were moved to DCC and the men at DCC to Vienna.

The steady increase in the number of women incarcerated at DCC—a 340% increase between 1975 and 1979—resulted in putting five women to a room and in a shortage of space for a fully effective reformation program. Plumbing and heating were poor, and the scattering of inmates in separate buildings created security issues and need for more staff. Barbed wire was added to the security fence to further discourage escapes.

The garment industry was producing drapes, towels, pajamas, robes, shifts, dresses, and blouses in 1980. The factory manager stated that the skills gained in sewing would translate into jobs on the outside, but a spokesperson from the Government Accountability Office said that their skills would be "'technologically useless' because of the prison's antiquated equipment". Inmates could earn about $5.00 a day working 8:00 a.m. to 3:45 p.m. on weekdays, and some used the funds to help support their children at home.

=== Sexual assaults and lawsuits ===
Fearing sexual assault by other inmates in September 1977, a 22-year old attempted an escape by climbing the DCC's fence. She stated that she saw lesbian activity in public spaces and had been told that 85% of the inmates were lesbians. She said she also feared that inmates would forcibly abort her pregnancy. While lesbian activity was prohibited in the prison, a new regulation forbidding women from entering each other inmate's rooms was established.

In September 1979 two senior staff members, an investigative officer and a security chief, were charged with sexually assaulting two inmates. The inmates also alleged that "sex parties" were being held, and that they were being arranged by an inmate secretary who worked in the office of the investigative officer, which was in a cottage. Inmates alleged that the sexual abuse had been reported when Sutliff first arrived, but an investigation cleared the accused men. In the 1979 report, other inmates, who were given lie detector tests, backed up the allegations of the two making the complaint. The two staff members were suspended and eventually terminated. Sutliff, whom the director of corrections described as "a good warden" and innocent of any wrongdoing, resigned on September 14. Lawsuits were filed by the two inmates in July 1980 against the two officers, Sutliff, the Assistant Director of Corrections, Linda Giesen, and the Director of Corrections for $9,999 each. The court found in favor of the administrators, and a mistrial was declared in the case of one of the officers.

== 1979–1982 Linda Giesen's superintendence ==
On October 1, 1979, Linda Ann Giesen, the assistant warden of operations at DCC reformatory, assumed Sutliff's position. Giesen, who had a degree in criminology and had played a key role in notifying state officials of the sex abuse scandal stated that she planned to have an "open door" policy and be accessible. She stated a need for procedural guidelines and more objective operations. She said that she believed a system could be set up to prevent abuse and to keep order. Her immediate improvements were requiring female guards to accompany inmates to appointments, the placement of glass panels in interview rooms, specific schedules for guards, the moving of staff offices to more appropriate locations, a new segregation unit, new management positions to handle inmate complaints and discipline, new procedures for conducting searches and identifying contraband, and a new system for tracking keys.

=== Tensions escalate ===
In February 1980 a female guard reported being sexually assaulted by a male sergeant, an allegation supported by a lie detector test. She was placed on "authorized leave", and the male was kept on during the investigation. The female guard refused the leave and quit instead. An anonymous male guard reported that "the place (DCC) is ready to blow" because guards did not feel safe and the administration was neither consistent nor interested in relationships. In June a female guard was beaten by an inmate and was unable to summon help because there was no other guard in that maximum-security area and she was not equipped with a radio. She stated that she felt the administration was discriminating against her and that the beating was part of a larger pattern of harassment of guards.

One hundred members of FALN (Fuerzas Armadas de Liberación Nacional) protested treatment of four Puerto Rican inmates just outside the gates of the reformatory in November 1980. This was one of several incidents which Giesen faced during her tenure. In January 1981 inmates complained to a panel of corrections officials that there was no training for jobs, that jobs and vocational programs were limited, that there was a waiting list for drug abuse groups, and that they experienced discrimination. Inmates at DCC were able to achieve Jr. College degrees limited mostly to cosmetology, office skills, and sewing, while male inmates in some prisons were able to get a 4-year degree. They also complained about poor administration of inmates' relationships with children. In March there was a widespread outbreak of salmonella affecting more than 65 inmates that was not reported to authorities as required for two weeks after it began. An audit by the state found problems with pharmacy and telephone records and weekly headcounts and notified the administration that if they were not resolved their budget for the next fiscal year could be affected.

On July 15, 1982, Giesen was transferred to the all-new male prison in Dixon, Illinois, as part of a major shift of administrations in Illinois prisons. Jane C. Huch, assistant warden at DCC since 1980, became the new warden.

== 1982–1992 Jane Huch (Higgins) superintendence ==
Huch had trained as a teacher, attended college in New York, worked at Head Start in Harlem, and taught in St. Louis, Missouri, and Springfield, Illinois, prior to her service at DCC. Stating that she wanted a change, Huch became a parole officer in Cook County and later an administrator of a work release program at DCC and of juveniles in Chicago. She was appointed as DCC's assistant warden in 1980. Her goal as a warden, she stated, was to provide incentives for inmates to move to lower-security sections, build quality parenting programs, and expand education.

=== Facility expansion and upgrades ===
In 1984 two new cell houses with a total of 96 new beds were added to the facility to relieve overcrowding, effectively increasing the capacity rating of the reformatory to 496 with two inmates per room. By the time inmates moved into the new cottages, however, the population stood at 518 and was expected to rise. The aging facility continued to necessitate major maintenance. In 1986 the water treatment and sewage plants were at capacity and improvements were needed in heating, plumbing, and energy efficiency. In 1987 the prison was allotted $2.5 million funding for the improvements, and by 1988 most of them were nearing completion. A drought in 1988 further strained the water supply at the prison, which was drawing water from wells.

Bids were also sought to repair a softball diamond, resurface the basketball court, and add bleachers. A 46-bed mental health unit was also created. Church Women United of Illinois, with the help of appropriations by the General Assembly, responded to Huch's vision of a multi-purpose chapel with a capacity of 200 by raising some of the $600,000 cost. Construction of the chapel began in 1991 and the building was dedicated in May 1993.

=== Parenting and substance abuse programs ===
Huch supported legislation to provide services to inmates and their children, including the creation of a new center where inmates could visit with their children, but the bills were not adopted. She nonetheless introduced inmate training for child nurture and development and management of relationship problems arising from incarceration and separation. She also created a "Children's Corner" where mothers and children could visit in a homey atmosphere.

Huch launched a drug abuse treatment program, which by 1989 was treating 27 women of all security classifications and had a waiting list. Funds were provided by a grant from the Chicago Gateway Foundation. Inmates in the program, which was spiritually based, were housed together in one cottage and treated as inpatients. At the heart of the program was improving the self-esteem and problem-solving skills of inmates and training in restraint from use of drugs. Encounter groups nurtured honesty in expression of emotions and provided an arena for airing grievances.

=== Camping program ===
In September 1985 24 trusted inmates were allowed to attend a Salvation Army weekend camping event for moms and children at the nearby Green Valley Camp. Building on the success of that weekend, Huch applied for and received a 3-year grant from the federal government for a permanent campground on the reformatory campus, a project launched in 1986.

Initially held on Fridays through Sundays from Memorial Day to Labor Day, the camp structured the family reunion time with tent-camping on the reformatory grounds, cook-outs, and outdoor activities. Up to fifteen inmates and their children, infant to age 16, participated each weekend, and the event was, for some children, the "highlight of the summer". Only inmates with no disciplinary sanctions could participate and women from all security classifications were eligible.

In 1998 the local AFSCME union protested the event because the reformatory was "a prison, not a campground". Further, they stated, the event increased the possibility of contraband entering the prison, an inmate escaping, or a child being harmed by other inmates on the grounds. They said that the area was not well-lighted and that guards had been discouraged from hovering over the families." The president of the local AFSCME, Renee Bantista, further stated that "the female inmates of the '90's are equivalent to their male counterparts... more aggressive, gang-affiliated." By 2004 the camping program had been shortened to a one-day event.

=== Overcrowding ===
In 1986 Governor James R. Thompson proposed the construction of three new prisons to address overcrowding in Illinois prisons for men. The plan would also reduce the population at older institutions by 3,854 beds, 26 of which would come from DCC. At that time the DCC was the most crowded penal institution in the state, averaging 560 inmates each day, higher than the ideal capacity of 470 and design for 345. The prison was already contracting with county jails to house inmates and was considering the possibility of establishing work-release schools in the community. The plan for work-release facilities was stymied, however, by communities that wanted the prison, but not the prisoner.

The following year the IDOC announced a plan to transfer 75 women to the Logan Correctional Center in Lincoln, Illinois, where they would share public space with male inmates already there. By February 1987 the first women had moved, and after a period of incremental integration, men and women shared mealtimes, as well as recreation, education, and library privileges. The women resided in a separate unit, which was at a minimal cost adapted to women's needs. To be eligible for the co-ed prison, the inmate had to be classified as medium security, have less than seven years left in her sentence, and have demonstrated the ability to adjust to new situations. Forty women volunteered to move, but it was expected that other inmates would eventually be moved involuntarily. The IDOC stated that it would likely be a temporary solution to the overcrowding problem that would continue plague Illinois prisons.

=== Staff hardships ===
By 1988 DCC had an inmate population of 668 and a staff of 184. Morale among employees was low because they were required to work 16 hours a day in mandatory overtime. On one occasion an employee was scheduled for five consecutive 16-hour days, two of which the guard refused. The pressure on staff was compounded by staff members who were no-shows or sick.

In the summer of 1988 two guards were injured by four inmates in the isolation area of the prison when the guards attempted to seize contraband, which consisted of more personal items than inmates in isolation were allowed. One guard, who was hospitalized, was struck in head and leg and the other in the groin. The rebellion of the four ignited the fury of others in segregation, resulting in extensive damage to the cells. A tactical unit had to be summoned. Furthermore, eight guards had been injured in the two weeks previous. The outbreaks were attributed to overcrowding and under-staffing. Huch stated that she was constantly asking for more staff, but was prevented by the General Assembly, which decided how many guards each prison could employ. In the spring of 1989 the prison was finally authorized to add 22 more staff members to manage the population, which by then had grown to 770. By March 1990 the IDOC doubled the number of staff at DCC, but additional actions of double-celling women at both Logan and Dixon co-ed correctional centers, seeking or building a facility which could provide an additional 200–250 beds, and urging legislation expanding "good time" provisions for the early release of inmates convicted of armed robbery could not alleviate the consequences of the "explosive" growth of females in the penal system or the limits of the sewage system at DCC.

=== Kankakee satellite facility opened ===
In November 1991 the IDOC opened a 200-bed minimum-security satellite facility for female inmates in the former Illinois Youth Center in Kankakee, Illinois. This action was taken after a federal court ruled in favor of a class action discrimination lawsuit alleging that women were not provided substantially the same educational and vocational training as men and were housed together without regard to their security classification.

The state also allocated funds for needed building repairs and infrastructure improvement, including an upgrade to the locking system and replacement of roofing. A death row unit was completed in 1991 to house the first death row inmate since the death penalty was reinstated in Illinois in 1972. Funds were frozen by Governor Jim Edgar, however, for road rehabilitation and parking expansion, removal of underground storage tanks, and expanding the medical facility. A decision also to freeze spending on the chapel was met with a vigorous letter-writing campaign, however, and Edgar reversed his decision.

In 1992 Illinois prisons housed almost 30,000 inmates in space built for 20,000. Four facilities stood empty because the state lacked the means of funding them. To address increasing overcrowding Governor Jim Edgar formed a task force that was to recommend solutions that did not compromise safety or add cost. A bill that would force closing of the Kankakee annex to DCC prison was halted, however, by action of the house appropriations committee.

== 1993–1998 Gwendolyn V. Thornton ==
=== Safety issues ===
==== Violence ====
By mid-1993 DCC was facing several issues related to safety. Physical violence between inmates and on guards was more and more commonplace, prompting prison guards to attend a rally at the Capitol in Springfield in May 1994 to request funding to hire additional guards to address the growing violence. Guards were especially vulnerable because they were not allowed to carry guns, mace, or nightsticks.

One guard was assaulted by cleaning chemicals. An inmate was beaten by two others. A kitchen knife was confiscated in an inmate skirmish, and a pair of scissors went missing for two weeks. Another guard was cut with glass, and yet another stabbed with a makeshift knife. A social worker accompanying a child on a visit to its mother was attacked by a front-cuffed inmate. In 1998 an inmate started a "near riot" when she became belligerent over the theft of her soft drink. Other inmates joined the fray by throwing books and chairs on the officers from the higher level.

Several incidents of violence raised concerns about leniency in the prison. In one case a guard was stabbed with a fork after an inmate in segregation was denied recreation time. Despite the violence, the inmate was granted the recreation time later that day. In another, an inmate was released from segregation five days after a razor blade was found in her cell. The usual penalty for such an offense was a year in segregation.

==== AIDS ====
By 1993 AIDS was seriously impacting the prison population. The John Howard Association and Lutheran Social Services reported that 4% of all inmates in Illinois had either the disease or its precursor HIV and that "in-jail transmission of AIDS was tantamount to handing 'unadjudicated death sentences to some prisoners.'" They recommended the distribution of condoms or reducing the two-to-a-cell arrangement to single cell. Neither recommendation was adopted. A bill to give AIDS tests to all inmates to segregate those who tested positive was defeated by the state judiciary committee because the money would be better used fighting crime.

=== Truth-in-sentencing ===
A national movement to pass truth-in-sentencing policies compounded overcrowding problems at DCC and other Illinois prisons. Prior to passage of Illinois' law in August 1995, most inmates served between 35% and 50% of their sentences. The truth-in-sentencing law toughened sentencing, requiring those convicted of murder to serve 100% of their sentences and those convicted of sexual assault and other violent crimes to serve 85% of their sentences. It was estimated that the new law would increase the prison population by 60% and cost the state $320 million over the next 10 years.

=== Facility expansion and improvements ===
In 1994 Illinois' budget and Governor Edgar's release of funds allowed a few improvements to the DCC facility. The Americans with Disabilities Act required the installation of wheel chair ramps for public access areas. Interior roads were improved, a computer system was installed, a water tower was built, and a commissary was provided for an employee break area. The IDOC also planned to add at least 100 more beds at the Kankakee facility to provide additional space for the 845 inmates residing in DCC facilities. The $8 million needed for improvements to the medical facility and to expand the cafeteria and education building was released in February 1997 after a two-year partisan battle.

==== New cell house ====
In 1995 Governor Jim Edgar announced a plan to add a privately funded, 448-bed cell house at DCC which the state would then lease. The construction would begin in the spring of 1996. The $85 million facility opened on May 27, 1997, and was "X-shaped", requiring fewer guards than other models. The John Howard Society criticized the state legislature for trying to "build your way" out of overcrowding issues, insisting that the legislature needed to address root causes of crime instead. Illinois, they noted, was the only state to double-cell inmates in maximum security. They cited increases in assaults on staff, inmate health problems (including a new form of tuberculosis and AIDS), and higher recidivism rates because inmates were not equipped through education and vocational programming to reenter society.

=== Inmate advocacy ===
In 1994 legislators introduced a bill to allow children age 5 and under to live with their sole-custody inmate-mothers in special prison units, the purpose of which was to save a child in its formative of years from being shuffled between foster homes and consequently to reduce the children's potential for committing future crimes. State Representative Dan Rutherford led the offense against the bill, saying that the state should not play "'nannies and nursemaids' to the offspring of women convicted of serious, sometimes violent crimes". Children's physical and psychological health could be at risk, he said, and money could be better spent in improving the foster care system. Nonetheless, Legal Aid to Incarcerated Mothers continued to urge state corrections officials to provide a place were non-violent inmates could live with younger children.

In 1996 the IDOC was court-ordered to improve educational and vocational opportunities for women. Training at DCC, which was stretched to the limit because of over-population, was under fire also for limiting its curriculum to mostly "pink trades", and not toward development of skills that were needed outside the prison.

In 1997 the National Institute of Justice estimated that 65% of female inmates had chronic or acute problems with drug or alcohol addiction prior to their incarceration. The DCC was already investing over $200,000 a year on its program of drug rehabilitation, and it received an additional $200,000 from the federal government that would be used to add 140 beds to the 90-bed facility.

=== Protection of inmates from sexual abuse ===
In March 1996 two guards resigned after other correctional officers reported sexual relationships between some guards and inmates. As many as a dozen staff members, including lieutenants or captains, were allegedly involved. The alleged sex acts were described as "consensual" and were possible because inmates residing in the "honors dorms" where the encounters had occurred had less supervision and were given more independence by obeying rules. By May three additional guards were on administrative leave, yet another had resigned, and three were disciplined for failure to report the activity. The inmates involved were demoted in their classifications. A former employee and union officials said that some reports of favoritism made to management were ignored and that management did not help the guards enforce rules and procedures.

A study by the John Howard Association and Human Rights Watch of New York found evidence of "sexual intercourse, sexual assault, inappropriate sexual contact" in the prison, as well as "constant and highly sexualized verbal degradation of prisoners and unwarranted visual surveillance". They stated that inmate claims of sexual misconduct generally were not treated seriously, even when evidence pointed to their veracity, and that complainants were given unreliable polygraph tests and sometimes sent to isolation as retribution. The IDOC denial of mishandling complaints were tantamount, they said, of "making it impossible for them (inmates) to complain". The recommendations of the watchdog groups included forbidding any sexual contact (including "consensual"), better screening and training of guards, and exit interviews with inmates. Before the year 1996 ended, thirteen employees had left employment at DCC because of sexual abuse of inmates.

While sexual contact with inmates was against prison rules, it was not prosecutable as a criminal official misconduct offense. On February 1, 1997, a bill was introduced in the state legislature to make sexual contact with inmates a felony resulting in a prison sentence of 4–15 years and loss of pension benefits, regardless of whether "consent" had been obtained. The law was signed by Governor Edgar on July 7. Because the sexual misconduct law did not exist prior to July 7, 1977, and because a law about "official misconduct" (which included "socializing with committed persons") was, according to the circuit judge, "unconstitutionally vague", charges of official misconduct against three of the guards were dropped.

In May 1998 an inmate, Anita Esposito, filed a $5 million lawsuit against officers at DCC who had threatened to put her in segregation if she reported the August 1997 sexual misconduct of another officer. The inmate reported the incident to prison officials, who allegedly dismissed the complaint. As a result of her reporting she was charged by prison officials with sexual misconduct and placed in segregation for 30 days. Prison administrators were also named in Esposito's lawsuit.

=== Suicides and overdose ===
On June 6, 1997, Guinevere Garcia, a death row inmate whose sentence was commuted to life just 14 hours before her execution several months before, attempted suicide by cutting a 2-inch long, 1/2 inch deep gash in her wrist with a broken light bulb. She was hospitalized briefly and returned to her cell. She stated that she preferred to die rather than serve a life sentence.

Less than two months later, Amanda Wallace, who had been incarcerated for the murder of her 3-year-old son, attempted suicide. Using a strip of cloth from her robe to hang herself, she was hospitalized in critical condition and removed from life support on August 2. She had previously attempted suicide using the elastic from her underwear.

In December 1997 Ella May Scott, who also went by the name "Kim Ball", died of an overdose of Elavil that had been smuggled from the prison pharmacy. The pharmacy's failure to crush pills as required as well as a shortage of staff were blamed.

== 1998–1999 Donna Klein-Acosta's superintendence ==
On September 21, 1998, Thornton was appointed to administrate female offender programs at the IDOC, and Donna J. Klein-Acosta was appointed in her place. Klein-Acosta, who had served as the assistant warden for programs at DCC since January 1992, earned a bachelor's degree in psychology and corrections from Illinois State University and a master's degree in corrections from Chicago State University. She began employment with the IDOC in 1976 as a residence counselor at the Fox Valley Community Correctional Center and later as a reception unit administrator at the IDOC's St. Charles facility.

The DCC was by this time the most diverse prison in the state, with minimum, medium, and maximum-security inmates, along with provisions for inmates on death row, in protective custody, hospitalized, or needing psychiatric services. Klein-Acosta described the prison as a small town with its water and sewer treatment plants, school, residences, and industry. She stated her belief that prison reform led by role modeling and inspiration, education, and vocational training could stop the cycle of generation-to-generation crime.

By the late 1990s the female inmate population at DCC, which had a capacity for 884, was over 1,100, was growing at about 17% per year, and was requiring a statewide shuffling of beds. The employee union was again objecting to conditions, citing safety issues and overworking of staff, who had been scheduled for 2–3 extra shifts per week.

There continued to be allegations of sexual misconduct, despite the 1997 state law prohibiting any sexual contact regardless of consent. Efforts by Des Plaines Lutheran Social Services to provide volunteer-based programming to connect children with their mothers were resisted by the House committee studying prison reforms because such visits were, they stated, "complete disasters", providing opportunities for the smuggling of contraband. The committee instead introduced legislation that would require inmates and visitors to be separated by security glass for the first 90 days of an inmate's incarceration.

On May 17, 1999, after just 9 months of employment at DCC, Klein-Acosta was appointed to IDOC's Women and Family Services to oversee all correctional center programming for women. Glenda M. Blakemore was appointed to assume her position.

== 1999–2000 Glenda Blakemore's superintendence ==
Prior to arriving at DCC Blakemore had served as superintendent of the youth center in Warrensville, Illinois. She began her career in corrections in 1974 as the assistant coordinator at youth center in St. Charles, Illinois. During her one-year term of service the IDOC announced the end of the "experiment in sociology" that allowed women in Illinois prisons to wear street clothes and issued in their place uniforms—white shirts and blue pants. The purpose of the uniform was to cut down on the time needed for security checks for contraband and to reduce confusion between inmates and visitors. The women were also issued 2' x 1' "property boxes" into which all personal items had to fit.

=== Problems with cell house design ===
Administrators stated that the X-shaped cell house design at DCC, modeled after cell houses at male prisons, had many shortcomings and that overcrowding aggravated the problems. The lack of sound-proofing and the tendency of women to be more vocal than men in relationships made sleep difficult and contributed to stress. Inadequate facilities for counseling in the cell house meant that many of the women's emotional and psychological needs went unmet. Their histories of sex abuse made privacy issues more urgent. Women tended to have more health issues than men because of sexually transmitted diseases, poor nutrition, and drug abuse. Since a great percentage of inmates were also mothers with young children provision of suitable visiting space was a need, as well. Officials stated they were hesitant to make suggestions for adaptations because of lawmakers' resistance to "pampering" inmates.

=== Decatur facility opens ===
On January 24, 2000, a new minimum-security female facility was opened in Decatur, Illinois, in the former Adolf Meyer Mental Health and Development Center, which had been adapted to address some of these female inmate needs. The new facility would eventually house 500 inmates, some of whom would be transferred from DCC. Linda Dillon, Assistant Deputy Director of the IDOC, stated that the Decatur facility would be "heavily programmed to try to reconnect women with their children before they return home". Eligible inmates would have about two years left in their sentences and would receive educational and vocational training provided by Richland Community College. Another new facility in Hopkins Park, Illinois, was expected to provide an additional 1,800 beds, but was still three years away from opening. The DCC would continue to receive and classify all female inmates.

=== College program ===
In August 1999 Lake Land College of Mattoon, Illinois, announced the addition of the DCC to their existing programs of education at other state prisons, programs in place since 1971. The college would provide enough credits for inmates to earn vocational certificates and make progress toward degree programs. Those who completed the educational program had 13% recidivism rates as opposed to the average 38% for those who had not.

=== Y2K ===
As the new millennium approached, the IDOC shared the public's concerns for the impact of "Y2K", a potentially critical computer bug that would impact file storage and date-based applications. Fearing malfunction of electronic security devices and the administrative distraction, officials moved high-risk inmates to unfamiliar settings in other prisons, went on lockdown for the whole weekend, and took the precaution of having extra food and water on hand. No problems were encountered.

== 2000–2003 Lynn Cahill-Masching's superintendence ==
Lynn Cahill-Masching, a Streator, Illinois, native, started with the IDOC in 1978 after earning bachelor's degrees in criminology and business administration and a master's degree in education, both from Illinois State University.

=== Helping Paws service-dog training ===
Helping Paws Dog Assistance Program, a service-dog training program, was launched at DCC in May 2000. Volunteers from the Clarence Foundation provided dogs that were abandoned, abused, or in shelters and provided for associated costs of dog care. Lake Land College provided 300 hours of classroom education in care and training of the dogs and issued a certificate that would make inmates eligible to be veterinary assistants, dog groomers, and trainers and to earn certificates as dog handlers or master dog handlers. The dogs, which lived with inmates in their cottages, were trained by inmates who were selected based on their interest, their security classification, their attitude, and the seriousness of crimes they committed. Once the dog's training was completed, the dogs were placed by non-profit organizations in homes of special needs people.

The director of the IDOC, Donald Snyder, stated that the program was designed not only to provide inmates with marketable skills, but to reinforce, also, "a commitment of responsibility, the work ethic and compassion for others". The warden said that the Helping Paws program reinforced the "fundamental ideas of rehabilitation and education for female inmates upon which Dwight Correctional Center was based".

The Helping Paws Program was transferred to the Logan Correctional Center in Lincoln, Illinois, when the DCC closed in 2013.

=== Dwight and the Illinois budget crisis ===
In August 2000 Representative Dan Rutherford considered a bill to increase funding for the DCC, but stated that he wanted first to know why 248 officers worked 7,245 hours of overtime (or 990 shifts) in July—the first month of Illinois' fiscal year. Rutherford blamed the prison for not asking for more employees or filling vacant positions. The union stated that high absenteeism accounted for some of the overtime, as did the discipline for refusing a shift, which was to take a day without pay. Some guards, anticipating overtime, would schedule themselves for an additional 2–3 overtime shifts per week to have predictable time off, but even this strategy failed from time to time. A temporary solution was to transfer guards from Pontiac, effectively shifting the overtime issues to that prison, but retirements and resignations at DCC would soon make the arrangement a break-even. In 2000 there were just 8 nurses on staff and two more were expected to leave at the end of the year. These nurses were expected to treat over 1,000 inmates at DCC. The facility in which the nurses was working was also inadequate, and they were exhausted from working 12–16 hour shifts 2–3 days a week.

The overtime issues persisted into 2001, at which time Governor George Ryan proposed adding 28 more guards to the staff at DCC. According to the union fifty new officers were needed, however. A year later Ryan addressed the continuing budget crisis by suggesting that all prison employees take an unpaid day off (which would require another employee to work overtime), and mandating that food and housekeeping services be privatized. The union said privatizing would result in job losses for 16 employees, serious security problems, and no financial gain for the state. The union took the matter to court, arguing that Ryan's privatization plan violated the Private Correctional Facility Moratorium Act, and the judge issued a temporary restraining order. The president of AFSCME stated that the DCC was not to blame for the state's budget problems: "They have overspent, and they have to rectify it." A few months later in a 47–4 vote, lawmakers blocked the privatization plan. In 2003, as part of his plan to address the state's $4.8 billion deficit, Governor Rod Blagojevich decided to "streamline bureaucracy" in the IDOC by terminating the employment of middle-management. The DCC would lose 10 positions.

By 2003 the overtime at the prisons statewide added up to an additional $19.3 million or the equivalent of 330 more full-time employees working 50 weeks per year. Two million of those dollars were spent at Dwight. In October 2003 the IDOC announced that a new class of prison guards would be assigned in November to the various prisons around the state. Of those 110 new guards, Dwight was to receive one. Further 32 employees were being transferred to other facilities. The IDOC promised, that additional guards were still in training.

In May 2003 Cahill-Masching took advantage of IDOC's early retirement program, leaving the post at DCC. The prison did not immediately hire a replacement because of a focus on reorganization in the IDOC. The day-to-day duties of the warden were taken up by the two assistant wardens.

== 2003–2013 The last decade ==
=== Wardens ===
In November 2004 Alyssa Williams was appointed warden. Williams had a bachelor's degree in psychology from Bradley University and a master's in marriage, child, and family therapy from Chapman University. She joined the IDOC in 2001 as a parole officer in East St. Louis. She had previously worked with sex offenders at Western State Hospital in Tacoma, Washington. She had also worked in clinical services in the IDOC at Warrenville, Illinois. Williams stated that her goal was to reclaim the reputation of a model prison as it was at its founding. She said that programs improving parenting and mental health were important.

Other wardens appointed to DCC in its last decade included Mary Siglar, who retired from her position in 2009. She was followed by Caroline Trancoso, who had served as warden at Logan Correctional Center for the previous 4.5 years. Sheryl Thompson was warden from 2010 to the prison's closing.

=== Charges of criminal sexual misconduct ===
In March 2004 a federal lawsuit was filed by an inmate alleging a fondling incident in May 2003. A male guard, it said, approached the inmate while she was concluding a shower and fondled her. She sought $50,000 in damages for emotional pain and embarrassment. In August charges of battery, criminal sexual abuse, and criminal custodial sexual misconduct were filed against a male guard by a female officer alleging that in March the guard cornered her in the prison's bakery, asked to see her breasts, and forcibly touched her breast through her shirt. The inmate charged that the guard had forcibly rubbed his penis against her buttocks in June. The guard was acquitted of the charges of sexually assaulting the guard in August 2005. At that time the incident with the inmate had not been resolved.

In 2008 allegations of repeated instances of sexual misconduct and rape by male guards with the knowledge of administrators at DCC resulted in two lawsuits filed in the U.S. District Court in Chicago. In the first case, in 2007 a woman gave birth to a baby while in isolation, prompting an Illinois State Police investigation. The woman, who had been denied access to anyone to whom she could appeal—prison officials, an attorney, or the media, stated that she had been raped 29 times by at least seven guards. The second woman said that a male guard had observed her gynecological exam and subsequently sexually harassed her. When she complained, she was placed in isolation, denied educational opportunities, and given reduced visiting hours. The punishment was later determined to have been improper. The attorney who filed the suits stated that she had heard comparable stories from a number of women the previous ten years. The IDOC responded by installing 200 video cameras throughout the prison and by posting the names and contact information of prison officials to whom the inmates could appeal confidentially to report abuse.

In 2012 the John Howard Association stated they had received reports of sexual harassment and abuse from DCC inmates. They said that more female guards needed to be recruited so that male guards would not be used in cell blocks, where showers and bathrooms were in the open.

=== Governor Blagojevich vs AFSCME ===
At the end of 2004 Governor Rod Blagojevich commissioned a panel to study recidivism. The aim of the study was to reduce the population of the prisons by offering services available to inmates upon release. He also proposed to reduce the number of positions in the IDOC by 367 positions. He stated that the proposed reductions would be accomplished through turnover and retirement of employees. He also announced a proposal to furlough workers on a rotating basis, which could save the state $86 million in the remaining fiscal year. AFSCME stated that furloughing employees would present a hardship on families and result in more overtime for employees on duty since the prisons continued to be severely understaffed.

In 2005 AFSCME reported that the ratio of guards to inmates in Illinois was the lowest in the nation. Assaults on guards and between inmates were increasing and prisons ran a higher risk of escapes. Dwight reported being short 100 employees—60 of which would be guards. The union also stated that overtime payment for guards was sometimes equal to or more than administrators and that employees preferred having time off. By 2009 overtime pay was costing the state $67 million.

=== The doors close ===
By 2010 the statewide population of inmates was nearly 3,000 more than in 2009. The increase was attributed to Governor Quinn's suspension of two programs, The Meritorious Good Time Push program and Meritorious Good time, for what was reported to be political reasons. The latter had been in place for 30 years. Hiring 500 more officers saved the state from overtime costs, but it was still delinquent by months in paying vendors, some of whom had stopped extending credit. There were no state funds to operate the newest prison, the Thompson maximum-security facility, built in recent years.

In 2011 Quinn's budget provided for no increases in employee salaries, despite an AFSCME contract that called for 2% for the remainder of 2011 and more in 2012. The union filed a federal lawsuit and stated a willingness to work with a mediator.

In February 2012 Illinois Governor Pat Quinn announced plans to cease operations of 59 state institutions as a means of helping the state address its massive indebtedness. The DCC, by then the only Illinois facility capable of housing maximum security female inmates, was among those targeted and was slated for closure by August 31, 2013.

Quinn had directed the IDOC to shave $112 million from their budget, which represented 9% of the current level of funding. Dwight, they said, needed $18.2 million for major maintenance, and $6 million of that would be needed immediately for urgent updates. An amount of $524,000 would be needed to segregate the maximum-security DCC inmates from those in the mental health unit. The IDOC estimated that shutting operations of the DCC down would save the state $37.3 million a year.

The bipartisan Commission on Government Forecasting and Accountability recommended that the prison stay open, and the General Assembly passed a budget including funding for the prisons, but this did not alter the course of Governor Quinn's plan for balancing the state's budget. AFSCME called Quinn's plans "reckless" because of existing overcrowding issues.

The prison itself made efforts to reduce costs by instituting a "Green" program. It was educational, as well. DCC saved $6,000 per year in dumpster costs. It expanded its garden to provide fresh produce for inmates. Laundry was monitored to limit items passing through each cycle, and mop heads were air-dried. Inmates were issued mesh bags to replace paper bags. An Earth Day poster contest was held for each of the offender living units.

=== Impact ===
At the time of the gubernatorial directive the DCC was housing a total of 1,000 inmates and was the largest employer in the city of Dwight, providing jobs to about 350 people. A study by Northern Illinois University reported that closure of the facility would result in a ripple effect loss of 629 jobs and $53.7 million (or 5%) of the gross regional product in Grundy, Kankakee, LaSalle, and Livingston counties.

Employees of the center and residents of Dwight and neighboring counties also mounted an organized and intensive campaign to keep the doors open. Supporters were urged to contact any official with the power to impact the governor's decision and respectfully explain the personal impact the closure would have on them and their communities. They were also encouraged to highlight DCC's unique role in IDOC with its long history of innovative vocational education programs.

=== Quinn vs AFSCME ===
On August 2, 2012, AFSCME filed a lawsuit to halt the prison closures because of the state's legal responsibility to provide safe working environments for employees. The union stated specific objections to transferring inmates, particularly maximum-security inmates, to already overcrowded prisons that were not equipped to handle them. They further objected to inmates being incorrectly classified to justify transfers to prisons with lower security standards. At the end of August an arbitrator ruled that Quinn was violating terms of a legal agreement with the union to resolve concerns about employees' safety prior to closing, and a court placed a restraining order on the closure.

Also at the end of August, despite the restraining order and the unresolved AFSCME suit, Quinn vetoed lines in the budget that funded the targeted facilities. Late in October Quinn an arbitrator ruled that Quinn had "acted reasonably" in continuing to take steps toward closure, although the arbitrator agreed with the union that it would be better to keep the prisons open. At the end of October, the Illinois Senate overrode Quinn's veto on the funding, Herald and Review (Decatur, Illinois) · Thu, Nov 29, 2012 · Page 1 but the House allowed it to stand, permitting Quinn to move forward with his plans unhindered by legislators.

The John Howard Association asked the state not to close DCC because of its historical commitment to creating a rehabilitative environment to meet unique female needs, many of which result from trauma and sexual, physical, and emotional abuse. The IDOC stated that programming would follow inmates to Logan, namely construction, parenting, and nail technology. It was equally concerned for the stress overcrowding would produce for inmates and employees and the impact on family visitations to inmates, many of whom were from Chicago. Studies showed that visits helped deter inmates from committing future crimes.

AFSCME's lawsuit to prevent the closing of DCC and other targeted facilities continued into 2013, even as facility adjustments were being made to Logan Correctional Center, which would become all female. The transfer to Logan required prisons to which males were transferred to use gymnasiums converted to provide bunk space, perpetuating AFSCME concerns for security.

To address what the IDOC anticipated to be a swelling inmate population in 2013, Quinn instituted a politically unpopular early-release program, supported in generalities by lawmakers, which was anticipated to ease the population by 700.

=== Closing inevitable ===
By March 1, 2013 Quinn had prepared a 2013–2014 budget which did not include funding for DCC, a move that convinced employees of DCC that closure was inevitable. By then three hundred and nineteen employees of the correctional center took vacant positions in other facilities. Twelve employees retired or resigned, and 19 were laid off.

The last of the inmates were transferred to the Logan Correctional Center, located in Lincoln, Illinois, on March 26, 2013, five days before the March 31 deadline set for the facility's shut-down. Dwight Mayor Bill Wilkey stated that he hoped the facility would reopen: "It means getting a new governor, but I see it happening."

=== Employee and community resistance ===
The state prison guards' union stated concern for the impact the closings would have, particularly on small towns, and they filed a lawsuit, objecting to the increased risk for guards in overcrowded prisons and in facilities that were designed for low risk inmates, not prisoners requiring a maximum security environment.

Employees of the center and residents of DCC and neighboring counties also mounted an organized and intensive campaign to keep the doors open. Supporters were urged to contact any official with the power to impact the governor's decision and respectfully explain the personal impact the closure would have on them and their communities. They were also encouraged to highlight DCC's unique role in IDOC with its long history of innovative vocational education programs.

== 2013–present ==
Following the shuttering of DCC, Livingston County Sheriff Martin Meredith began conversations with the state to turn the newer cell blocks into a "profit-making overflow jail for the county" by leasing space to other counties. It would cost an additional $3–4 million to ready the facility for new inmates, but could also create 56 more jobs. The plan would require a commitment from Cook County to make use of the facility. When Sheriff Meredith stepped down, conversations were expected to halt until a new sheriff was in place.

A lack of maintenance on the grounds under the management of the IDOC was raised as a concern by State Senator Jason Barickman, who stated that a failure to perform basic outdoor maintenance such as mowing the tall grass and weeds was a blight on the community. Effective July 1, 2014, the IDOC transferred management of the property to the Department of Central Management, which planned to appraise the property before offering to other state or local agencies. The Department of Human Services used the gymnasium to house 2,200 metal file cabinets and placed three employees there to manage them.

On September 1, 2015, the State of Illinois began a five-year contract with the Dwight Fire Protection District to allow use of several cottages, the infirmary, and adjacent buildings for training in advance firefighting beginning in 2016. Sharing the grounds with the Romeo Fire Academy permitted the Dwight department to train their firefighters at no cost to the taxpayer. The plan also included future training for State Police, U.S. Army, and National Guard.

== Notable inmates ==
Notable inmates incarcerated at the facility include:

- Patricia Colombo – convicted of the 1976 murders of her mother, father and 13-year-old brother. She was sentenced to 300 years
- Nicole Abusharif – convicted of murdering her domestic partner, Rebecca Klein
- Amanda Wallace – murdered her 3-year-old son in Chicago, Illinois

== See also ==
- John Howard Association of Illinois
