= Lincoln Correctional Center =

Prison in Illinois, United States

Coordinates: 40°07′00″N 89°23′23″W

- Interactive map of Lincoln Correctional Center
- Location: 1098 1350th Street Lincoln, Illinois
- Status: minimum
- Capacity: 1019
- Opened: 1984
- Managed by: Illinois Department of Corrections

The Lincoln Correctional Center is a minimum-security state prison for men located in Lincoln, Logan County, Illinois, owned and operated by the Illinois Department of Corrections. The facility was opened in 1984 and has a capacity of 1019 inmates at a minimum security level.

The campus is adjacent to the Logan Correctional Center and to Edward R. Madigan State Fish and Wildlife Area (formerly known as Railsplitter State Park).
