= Quessenberry =

Quessenberry is a surname. Notable people with the surname include:

- David Quessenberry (born 1990), American football offensive guard
- Paul Quessenberry (born 1992), American football tight end
- Scott Quessenberry (born 1995), American football offensive guard

== See also ==
- Quisenberry, surname
