= Lincoln, Illinois =

- City
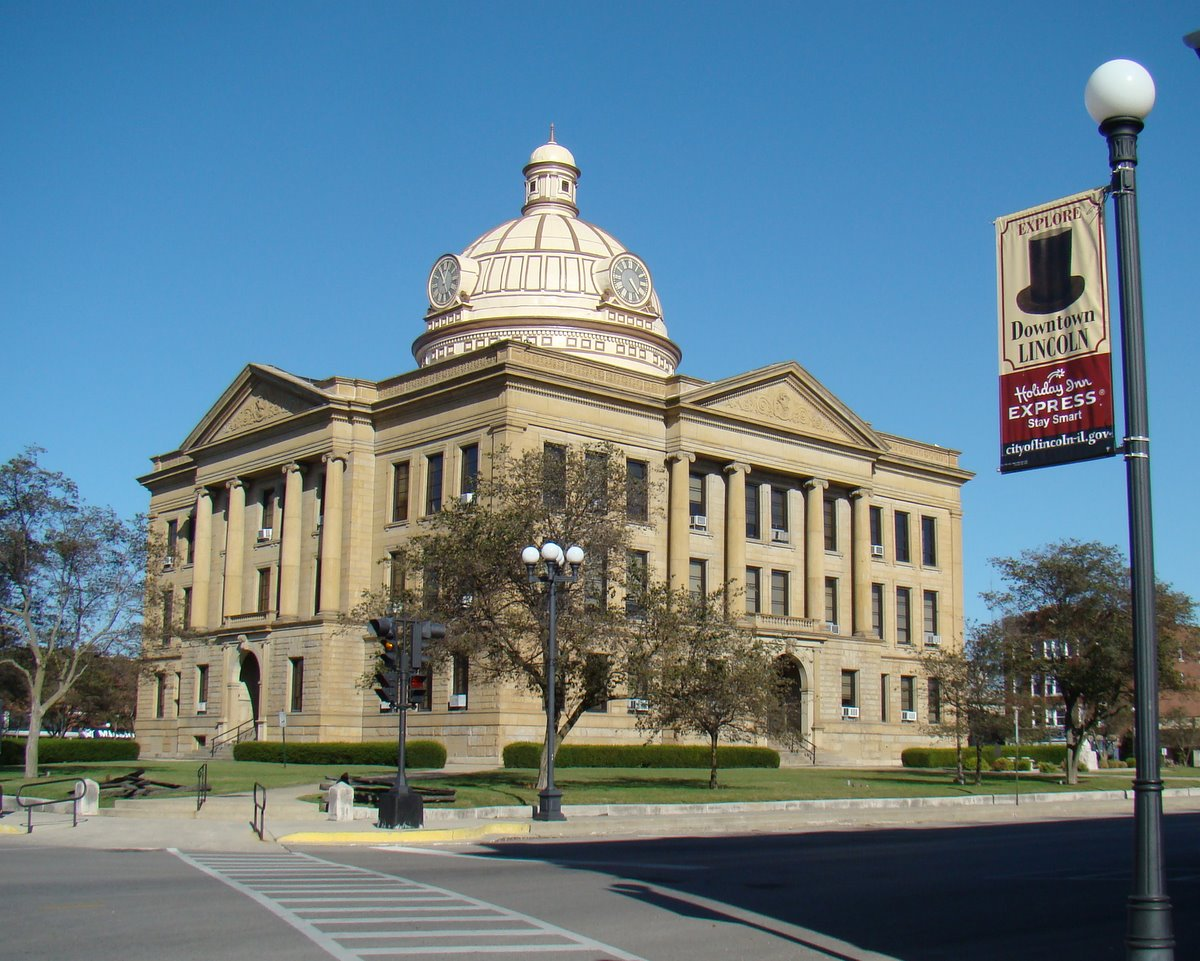
- Logan County Courthouse
- Interactive map of Lincoln, Illinois
- Location within Illinois Location within the United States
- Coordinates: 40°8′52″N 89°21′49″W
- Country: United States
- State: Illinois
- County: Logan
- Township: Broadwell, Chester, East Lincoln, West Lincoln

Area
  - Total: 6.25 sq mi (16.19 km^{2})
  - Land: 6.25 sq mi (16.18 km^{2})
  - Water: 0.0039 sq mi (0.01 km^{2})
- Elevation: 589 ft (180 m)

Population (2020)
  - Total: 13,288
  - Density: 2,127.1/sq mi (821.28/km^{2})
- Time zone: UTC−6 (CST)
  - Summer (DST): UTC−5 (CDT)
- ZIP code: 62656
- Area code: 217
- FIPS code: 17-43536
- Website: http://www.lincolnil.gov/

Lincoln is a city in and the county seat of Logan County, Illinois, United States. First settled in the 1830s, it is the only town in the U.S. that was named for Abraham Lincoln before he became president. As a lawyer, he pled cases in courtrooms there from 1847 to 1859. Lincoln is home to two prisons. It is the home of the world's largest covered wagon and numerous other historical sites along the Route 66 corridor. There is a National Weather Service Forecast Office in Lincoln.

The population was 13,288 at the 2020 census.

== History ==
The town's standard history holds that it was officially named on August 27, 1853, in an unusual ceremony. Abraham Lincoln, having assisted with the platting of the town and working as counsel for the newly laid Chicago & Mississippi Railroad which led to its founding, was asked to participate in a naming ceremony for the town. On this date, the first sale of lots took place in the new town.

Ninety were sold at prices ranging from $40 to $150. According to tradition Lincoln was present. At noon he purchased two watermelons and carried one under each arm to the public square. There he invited Latham, Hickox, and Gillette, proprietors, to join him, saying, "Now we'll christen the new town," squeezing watermelon juice out on the ground.

Legend has it that when it had been proposed to him that the town be named for him, he had advised against it, saying that in his experience, "Nothing bearing the name of Lincoln ever amounted to much." The town of Lincoln was the first city named after Abraham Lincoln, while he was a lawyer and before he was President of the United States.

Despite that story, newspaper reports make it clear that the city's name of Lincoln was chosen at least several weeks before the August 27 date. The new site of Lincoln was about three-quarters of a mile from the small settlement of Postville. "The position is fine and commanding, and if it does not make a big city, we have no doubt it will soon arrive at the dignity of a flourishing and respectable town," the Illinois State Register wrote. "We will also add that the town was named by the proprietors, of whom our enterprising citizen, Virgil Hickox, is one, in honor of A. Lincoln, esq., the attorney of the Chicago and Mississippi Railroad Company."

Lincoln College, chartered Lincoln University, a private four-year liberal arts college, was founded in early 1865 and granted 2 year degrees until 1929. News of the establishment and name of the school was communicated to President Lincoln shortly before his death, making Lincoln the only college to be named after Lincoln while he was living. Despite the city of Lincoln's 90%+ white population, Lincoln college was a historically black school. After a cyber attack in 2021, Lincoln College closed permanently in May 2022. The college had an excellent collection of Abraham Lincoln–related documents and artifacts, housed in a museum which was open to the general public before their closure.

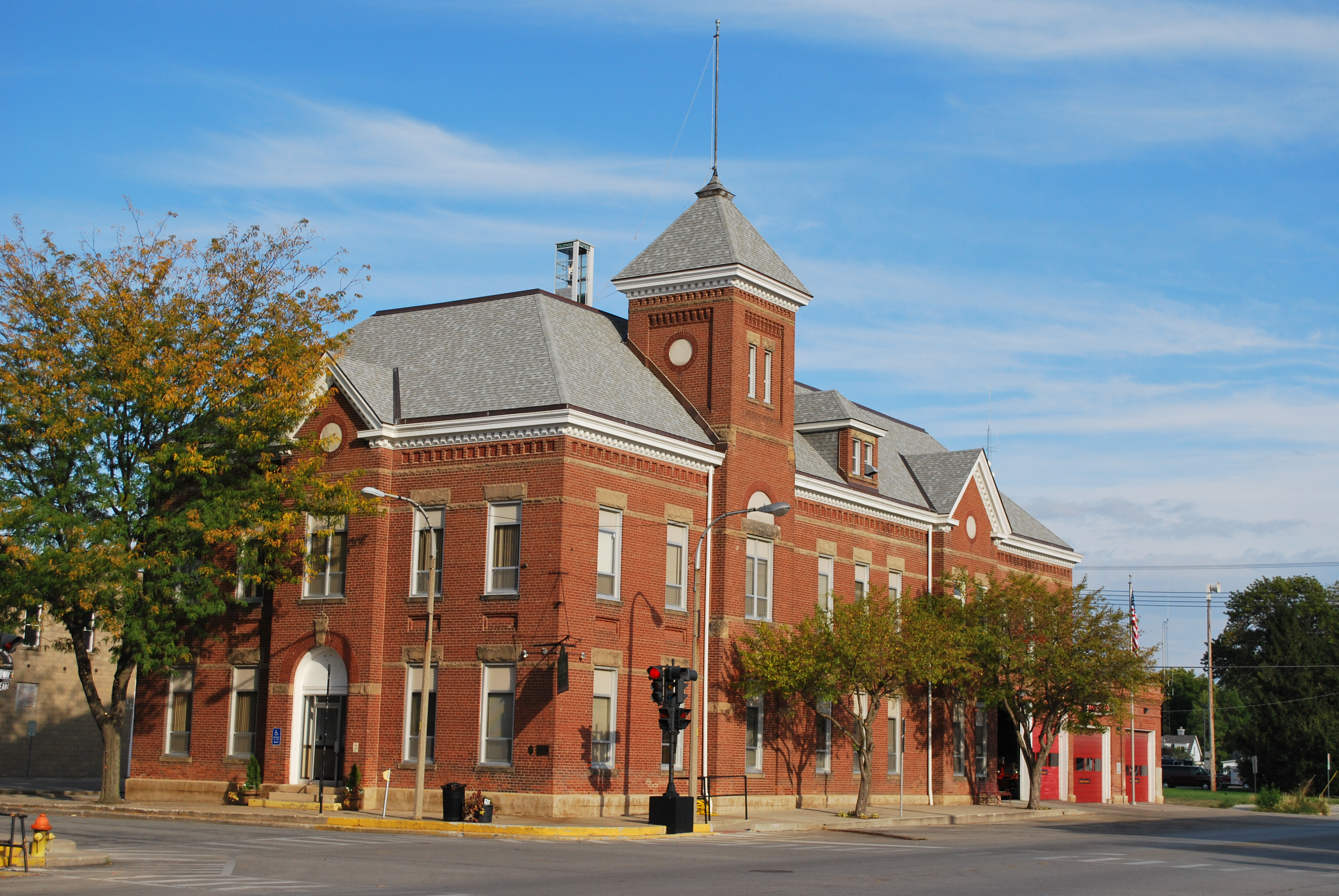
The Lincoln City Hall has a phone booth on the roof.

The City of Lincoln was located directly on U.S. Route 66 (US 66) from 1926 to 1978. This is its secondary tourist theme after the connection with Abraham Lincoln. The Lincoln City Hall was built in 1895. A phone booth was installed on the roof of the building in the 1960s for weather spotting.

American author Langston Hughes spent one year of his youth in Lincoln. Later on, he wrote to his eighth-grade teacher in Lincoln, telling her his writing career began there in the eighth grade, when he was elected class poet.

American theologians Reinhold Niebuhr and Helmut Richard Niebuhr lived in Lincoln from 1902 to their college years. Reinhold Niebuhr first served as pastor of a church when he served as interim minister of Lincoln's St. John's German Evangelical Synod church following his father's death. Reinhold Niebuhr is best known as the author of the Serenity Prayer.

The City of Lincoln features the stone, three-story, domed Logan County Courthouse, built in 1905. This courthouse building replaced the earlier Logan County Courthouse, built in 1858, where Lincoln once practiced law. The earlier building had fallen into serious decay and could not be saved. The Postville Courthouse State Historic Site contains a 1953 replica of the original 1840 Logan County courthouse. Postville, the original county seat, lost its status in 1848 and was annexed into Lincoln in the 1860s.

Lincoln was the site of the Lincoln Developmental Center (LDC), a state institution for the developmentally disabled. Founded in 1877, the institution was one of Logan County's largest employers until closed in 2002 by then-Governor George Ryan due to concerns about patient maltreatment. Despite efforts by some Illinois state legislators to reopen LDC, the facility remains shuttered.

== Geography ==
According to the 2021 census gazetteer files, Lincoln has a total area of 6.25 square miles (16.19 km^{2}), of which 6.25 square miles (16.19 km^{2}) (or 99.94%) is land and 0.00 square miles (0.00 km^{2}) (or 0.06%) is water.

I-55 (formerly US 66) connects Lincoln to Bloomington and Springfield. Illinois Route 10 (IL 10) and IL 121 run into the city. Amtrak serves Lincoln Station daily with its Lincoln Service and Texas Eagle routes. Service consists of four Lincoln Service round-trips between Chicago and St. Louis, and one Texas Eagle round-trip between San Antonio and Chicago. Three days a week, the Eagle continues on to Los Angeles.

Lines of the Union Pacific and Canadian National railroads run through the city. Salt Creek (Sangamon River Tributary) and the Edward R. Madigan State Fish and Wildlife Area are nearby.

=== Climate ===
Lincoln has a humid continental climate (Köppen: Dfa). Monthly means range from 26.1 °F (−3.3 °C) in January to 74.6 °F (23.7 °C) in July. There are 126 days below freezing, and 24 days above 90 °F (32 °C). Since having an average record minimum of −11 °F (−24 °C) (-24 °C) according to XMACIS, It lies in the USDA Plant Hardiness Zone 5b.

The highest temperature was 113 °F (45 °C) on July 15, 1936. The lowest was −34 °F (−37 °C) on January 15, 1927.

Climate data for Lincoln, IL (1991–2020 normals, extremes 1906–present)
| Month | Jan | Feb | Mar | Apr | May | Jun | Jul | Aug | Sep | Oct | Nov | Dec | Year |
|---|---|---|---|---|---|---|---|---|---|---|---|---|---|
| Record high °F (°C) | 70 (21) | 75 (24) | 86 (30) | 93 (34) | 102 (39) | 105 (41) | 113 (45) | 106 (41) | 104 (40) | 95 (35) | 83 (28) | 72 (22) | 113 (45) |
| Mean maximum °F (°C) | 57 (14) | 62 (17) | 74 (23) | 83 (28) | 89 (32) | 94 (34) | 94 (34) | 94 (34) | 92 (33) | 85 (29) | 72 (22) | 61 (16) | 96 (36) |
| Mean daily maximum °F (°C) | 34.5 (1.4) | 39.5 (4.2) | 51.7 (10.9) | 64.4 (18.0) | 74.8 (23.8) | 83.3 (28.5) | 85.5 (29.7) | 84.0 (28.9) | 79.2 (26.2) | 66.3 (19.1) | 51.4 (10.8) | 39.2 (4.0) | 62.8 (17.1) |
| Daily mean °F (°C) | 26.1 (−3.3) | 30.6 (−0.8) | 41.4 (5.2) | 52.6 (11.4) | 63.6 (17.6) | 72.3 (22.4) | 74.6 (23.7) | 72.6 (22.6) | 66.3 (19.1) | 54.1 (12.3) | 41.7 (5.4) | 31.1 (−0.5) | 52.2 (11.2) |
| Mean daily minimum °F (°C) | 17.8 (−7.9) | 21.6 (−5.8) | 31.1 (−0.5) | 40.8 (4.9) | 52.4 (11.3) | 61.3 (16.3) | 63.8 (17.7) | 61.3 (16.3) | 53.4 (11.9) | 41.8 (5.4) | 32.0 (0.0) | 23.1 (−4.9) | 41.7 (5.4) |
| Mean minimum °F (°C) | −6 (−21) | 1 (−17) | 12 (−11) | 25 (−4) | 37 (3) | 49 (9) | 53 (12) | 51 (11) | 38 (3) | 26 (−3) | 15 (−9) | 3 (−16) | −10 (−23) |
| Record low °F (°C) | −34 (−37) | −23 (−31) | −14 (−26) | −1 (−18) | 24 (−4) | 35 (2) | 41 (5) | 36 (2) | 22 (−6) | 7 (−14) | −3 (−19) | −29 (−34) | −34 (−37) |
| Average precipitation inches (mm) | 2.17 (55) | 1.92 (49) | 2.70 (69) | 4.24 (108) | 4.37 (111) | 4.16 (106) | 4.91 (125) | 3.47 (88) | 3.30 (84) | 3.42 (87) | 2.88 (73) | 2.29 (58) | 39.83 (1,012) |
| Average snowfall inches (cm) | 5.7 (14) | 6.2 (16) | 1.8 (4.6) | 0.0 (0.0) | 0.0 (0.0) | 0.0 (0.0) | 0.0 (0.0) | 0.0 (0.0) | 0.0 (0.0) | 0.1 (0.25) | 0.6 (1.5) | 4.9 (12) | 19.3 (49) |
| Average precipitation days (≥ 0.01 in) | 9.3 | 8.9 | 10.5 | 11.8 | 12.5 | 10.5 | 8.8 | 8.7 | 8.0 | 9.7 | 9.5 | 9.7 | 117.9 |
| Average snowy days (≥ 0.1 in) | 5.3 | 4.4 | 1.8 | 0.3 | 0.0 | 0.0 | 0.0 | 0.0 | 0.0 | 0.0 | 0.8 | 3.9 | 16.5 |
Source: NOAA

== Demographics ==
Historical population
| Census | Pop. | Note | %± |
|---|---|---|---|
| 1880 | 5,639 | | — |
| 1890 | 6,725 | | 19.3% |
| 1900 | 8,962 | | 33.3% |
| 1910 | 10,892 | | 21.5% |
| 1920 | 11,882 | | 9.1% |
| 1930 | 12,855 | | 8.2% |
| 1940 | 12,752 | | −0.8% |
| 1950 | 14,362 | | 12.6% |
| 1960 | 16,890 | | 17.6% |
| 1970 | 17,582 | | 4.1% |
| 1980 | 16,327 | | −7.1% |
| 1990 | 15,418 | | −5.6% |
| 2000 | 15,369 | | −0.3% |
| 2010 | 14,504 | | −5.6% |
| 2020 | 13,288 | | −8.4% |
U.S. Decennial Census

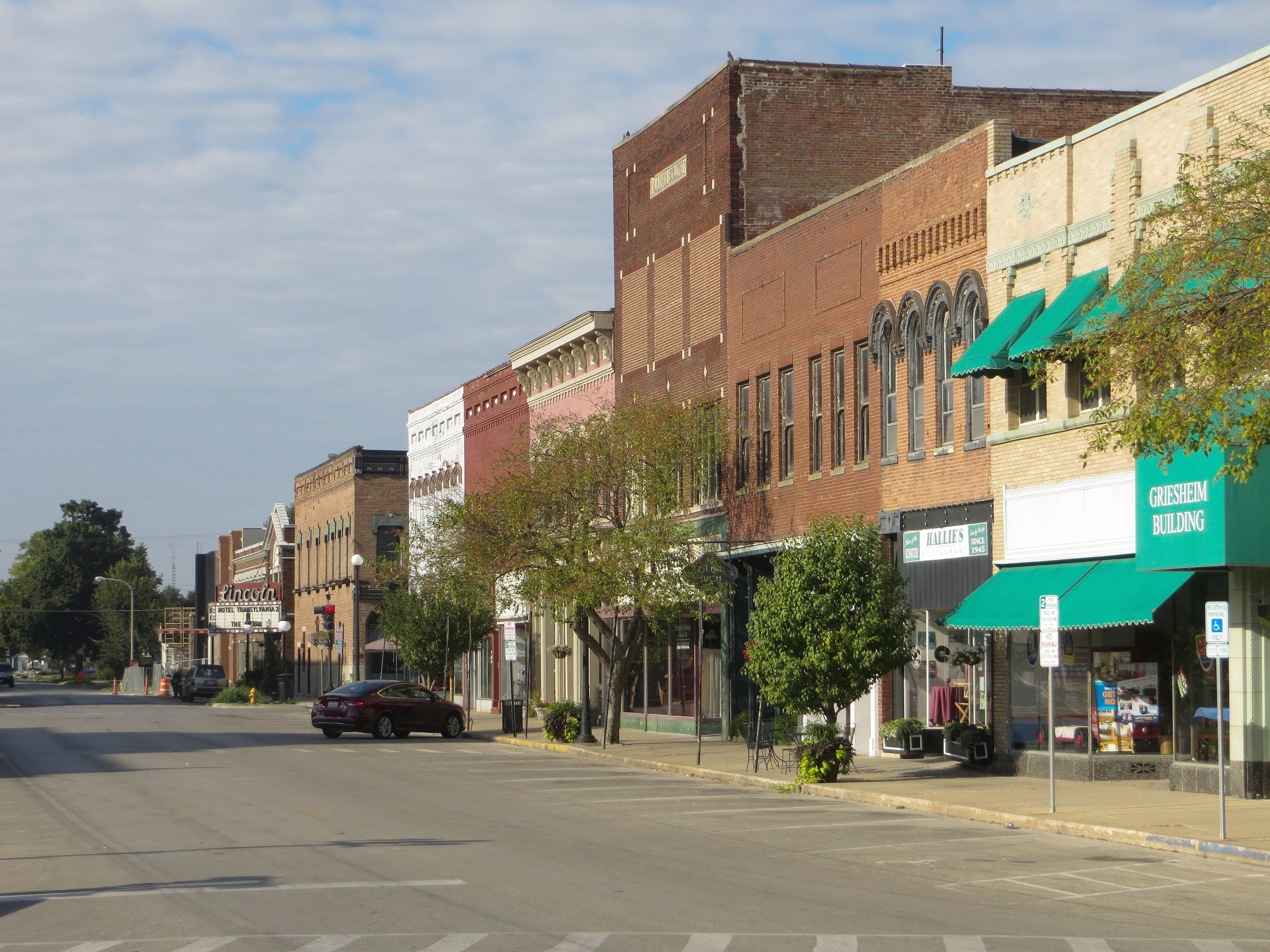
Kickapoo Street in Lincoln

As of the 2020 census there were 13,288 people, 5,954 households, and 3,441 families residing in the city. The population density was 2,125.74 inhabitants per square mile (820.75/km^{2}). There were 6,440 housing units at an average density of 1,030.24 per square mile (397.78/km^{2}). The racial makeup of the city was 89.63% White, 3.15% African American, 0.17% Native American, 0.86% Asian, 0.01% Pacific Islander, 0.82% from other races, and 5.37% from two or more races. Hispanic or Latino of any race were 2.61% of the population.

There were 5,954 households, out of which 21.5% had children under the age of 18 living with them, 42.16% were married couples living together, 7.89% had a female householder with no husband present, and 42.21% were non-families. 32.78% of all households were made up of individuals, and 16.69% had someone living alone who was 65 years of age or older. The average household size was 2.73 and the average family size was 2.11.

The city's age distribution consisted of 18.2% under the age of 18, 15.2% from 18 to 24, 21.2% from 25 to 44, 23.7% from 45 to 64, and 21.7% who were 65 years of age or older. The median age was 39.0 years. For every 100 females, there were 103.1 males. For every 100 females age 18 and over, there were 98.7 males.

The median income for a household in the city was $48,510, and the median income for a family was $59,931. Males had a median income of $36,003 versus $22,630 for females. The per capita income for the city was $29,046. About 12.8% of families and 14.3% of the population were below the poverty line, including 20.6% of those under age 18 and 7.8% of those age 65 or over.

There were 6,440 housing units, of which 11.0% were vacant. The homeowner vacancy rate was 3.6% and the rental vacancy rate was 8.3%.

Racial composition as of the 2020 census
| Race | Number | Percent |
|---|---|---|
| White | 11,910 | 89.6% |
| Black or African American | 418 | 3.1% |
| American Indian and Alaska Native | 23 | 0.2% |
| Asian | 114 | 0.9% |
| Native Hawaiian and Other Pacific Islander | 1 | 0.0% |
| Some other race | 109 | 0.8% |
| Two or more races | 713 | 5.4% |
| Hispanic or Latino (of any race) | 347 | 2.6% |

== Economy ==
The United States Postal Service operates the Lincoln Post Office.

The Illinois Department of Corrections Logan Correctional Center is located in unincorporated Logan County, near Lincoln.

Cresco Labs opened their cultivation site there and has since replaced over 250 jobs lost when the bottle factory closed down. The farm has shown to be an integral factor in Lincoln's economy.

== Education ==
Most of Lincoln is in the Lincoln Elementary School District 27. Parts are in West Lincoln-Broadwell Elementary School District 92 and Chester-East Lincoln Community Consolidated School District 61. All of Lincoln is in Lincoln Community High School District 404.

== Notable people ==
- Scott Altman, born in Lincoln; NASA astronaut and commander of Space Shuttle Columbia on its penultimate mission
- Brian Cook, forward for five NBA teams
- Henry Darger, writer and artist
- William D. Gayle, Illinois State Representative and Mayor of Lincoln
- Langston Hughes, poet, novelist, playwright
- Terry Kinney, actor, cofounder of the Steppenwolf Theatre Company
- David T. Littler, Illinois state legislator and lawyer
- Edward R. Madigan, U.S. Secretary of Agriculture (1991–1993), congressman (1973–1991)
- Robert Madigan, Illinois State Senator
- William Keepers Maxwell, Jr., author; his 1979 novel So Long, See You Tomorrow is set in Lincoln
- Kelly McEvers, journalist and correspondent for NPR
- Alberta Nichols, composer for Broadway, radio and films of the 1920s, 1930s and 1940s
- H. Richard Niebuhr, prominent American theologian, brother of Reinhold Niebuhr
- Reinhold Niebuhr, prominent American theologian and author of Serenity Prayer
- Stella Pevsner, children's book author
- Clifford Quisenberry, Illinois State Representative
- Rip Ragan, MLB pitcher for the Cincinnati Reds
- Dick Reichle, MLB outfielder for the Boston Red Sox
- Bill Sampen, former Major League baseball pitcher
- Kevin Seitzer, former Major League Baseball player
- Tony Semple, former National Football League player
- Willis R. Shaw, Illinois state senator
- John Schlitt, lead singer of Christian rock band Petra
- Larry Tagg, rock musician, songwriter, teacher, and historian
- John Turner, Illinois State Representative and judge
- Emil Verban, MLB second baseman for numerous teams
- Dennis Werth, MLB first baseman for the New York Yankees and Kansas City Royals
