= Willis R. Shaw =

American printer, editor, and politician (1860–1933)

Willis R. Shaw (June 17, 1860–March 29, 1933) was an American printer, newspaper editor, and politician.

Shaw was born in Charleston, Illinois. He was involved with the newspaper and printing business. He was involved with the Typographical Union and with the Democratic Party. He lived in Lincoln, Illinois with his wife and family. He served as the assessor for the West Lincoln Township, Logan County, Illinois. Shaw moved with his wife and family from Lincoln, Illinois to Decatur, Illinois in 1910. Shaw served in the Illinois Senate from 1913 to 1917. Shaw died from heart problems at his daughter's home in Decatur, Illinois.
