= Logan Correctional Center =

Prison in Illinois, United States

Coordinates: 40°07′05″N 89°23′21″W

- Interactive map of Logan Correctional Center
- Location: 1096 1350th Street Lincoln, Illinois, U.S.
- Status: Open
- Capacity: 2284
- Opened: January 1978
- Managed by: Illinois Department of Corrections

Logan Correctional Center is an American prison in the state of Illinois for female offenders in Broadwell Township, Logan County, Illinois, near Lincoln and 30 miles (48 km) north of Springfield. The 150-acre (61 ha) prison opened in January 1978. A 57-acre (23 ha) plot of fenced land houses general population prisoners. It lies just south of the Lincoln Correctional Center, a facility for male offenders.

Until mid-2000, Illinois had coed prisons, housing both male and female inmates in the same prison. The reason for making Logan Correctional Center a coed prison in 1987 was a fast-growing prison population. When it ended in 2000 it was declared an administrative burden, at the time Logan was supposed to become an all-male prison.

== Notable inmates ==
- Nicole Abusharif – convicted of the 2007 murder of her domestic partner, Rebecca Klein.
- Tanishia Covington - perpetrator of the 2017 Chicago torture incident hate crime
- Catherine Suh - charged and found guilty of murder, conspiracy to commit murder, and bribery, for the 1993 murder of her boyfriend Robert O'Dubaine. Sentenced to life in prison.
- Marni K. Yang - Charged and found guilty of murdering Shaun Gayle’s girlfriend, Rhoni Reuter.
- Christine Roush - Found guilty of murdering her birth mother Ann Poehlman, sentenced to 40 years. Featured on Snapped series 28.
- Sarah Kolb - one of the murderers of Adrianne Reynolds.

== Conditions ==
The conditions of the Logan Correctional Center have been found to be "untenable" based on a study funded by the Department of Justice in November 2016. In 2024, it was announced that Logan would be torn down as part of $900 million plan by Gov. JB Pritzker and IDOC to rebuild Stateville men’s prison and Logan women’s prison. On June 5, 2026, IDOC and the Illinois Capital Development Board (CDB) announced that a new women’s prison would be constructed in Crest Hill, Illinois, on the same property as the new Stateville prison.

According to the 2025 Annual PREA report, Logan had the only four substantiated cases of staff on person in custody sexual misconduct of all prisons in Illinois. Many of those incarcerated at Logan have experienced gender-based violence and prison reproduces this cycle of violence.

A 2026 monitoring report on Logan prison from watchdog group the John Howard Association described guards there as: “argumentative, not helpful, rude + degrading, make threats, call us names.”
