= Clifford Quisenberry =

American politician

Arthur Clifford Quisenberry (March 22, 1878 – August 28, 1916) was an American farmer and politician.

Born in Lincoln, Illinois, Quisenberry graduated from Lincoln High School in 1896. He graduated from Lincoln College and from the University of Illinois. Quisenberry was involved in banking, farming, and in live stock. Quisenberry served as treasurer for Logan County, Illinois and was involved with the Democratic Party. Quisenberry served in the Illinois House of Representatives from 1915 until his death. Quisenberry died from cancer of the liver at a hospital in Lincoln, Illinois.
