= Nevada Township, Livingston County, Illinois =

Coordinates: 41°03′41″N 88°31′07″W

Nevada Township
- Township
- Location in Livingston County

- Livingston County's location in Illinois
- Country: United States
- State: Illinois
- County: Livingston
- Established: November 3, 1857

Area
  - Total: 36.52 sq mi (94.6 km^{2})
  - Land: 36.51 sq mi (94.6 km^{2})
  - Water: 0.01 sq mi (0.026 km^{2}) 0.02%

Population (2020)
  - Total: 167
  - Density: 4.57/sq mi (1.77/km^{2})
- Time zone: UTC−6 (CST)
  - Summer (DST): UTC−5 (CDT)
- FIPS code: 17-105-52077

Nevada Township is located in Livingston County, Illinois. At the 2010 census, its population was 167 and it contained 90 housing units.

The Illinois Department of Corrections Dwight Correctional Center was within the township. It closed in 2013.

== Geography ==
According to the 2021 census gazetteer files, Nevada Township has a total area of 36.52 square miles (94.59 km^{2}), of which 36.51 square miles (94.56 km^{2}) (or 99.98%) is land and 0.01 square miles (0.03 km^{2}) (or 0.02%) is water.

== Demographics ==
As of the 2020 census there were 167 people, 84 households, and 21 families residing in the township. The population density was 4.57 inhabitants per square mile (1.76/km^{2}). There were 90 housing units at an average density of 2.46 per square mile (0.95/km^{2}). The racial makeup of the township was 94.61% White, 0.00% African American, 0.00% Native American, 0.00% Asian, 0.00% Pacific Islander, 0.00% from other races, and 5.39% from two or more races. Hispanic or Latino of any race were 1.20% of the population.

There were 84 households, out of which 0.00% had children under the age of 18 living with them, 17.86% were married couples living together, 0.00% had a female householder with no spouse present, and 75.00% were non-families. 75.00% of all households were made up of individuals, and 13.10% had someone living alone who was 65 years of age or older. The average household size was 1.25 and the average family size was 2.00.

The township's age distribution consisted of 0.0% under the age of 18, 1.0% from 18 to 24, 20% from 25 to 44, 68.6% from 45 to 64, and 10.5% who were 65 years of age or older. The median age was 62.2 years. For every 100 females, there were 275.0 males. For every 100 females age 18 and over, there were 275.0 males.

The median income for a family was $102,917. Males had a median income of $73,750 versus $43,036 for females. The per capita income for the township was $45,321. No families and 2.9% of the population were below the poverty line, including 0.0% of those age 65 or over.

Historical population
Census	Pop.	Note	%±
2000	220		—
2010	1,335		506.8%
2020	167		−87.5%
U.S. Decennial Census

== Notable people ==
- Eddie Higgins (baseball), MLB pitcher for the St. Louis Cardinals
