= Broadwell Township, Logan County, Illinois =

Coordinates: 40°05′31″N 89°25′21″W

Broadwell Township
- Township
- Location in Logan County

- Logan County's location in Illinois
- Country: United States
- State: Illinois
- County: Logan
- Established: November 7, 1865

Area
  - Total: 33.43 sq mi (86.6 km^{2})
  - Land: 32.93 sq mi (85.3 km^{2})
  - Water: 0.5 sq mi (1.3 km^{2}) 1.50%

Population (2020)
  - Total: 3,115
  - Density: 94.59/sq mi (36.52/km^{2})
- Time zone: UTC-6 (CST)
  - Summer (DST): UTC-5 (CDT)
- FIPS code: 17-107-08485

Broadwell Township is located in Logan County, Illinois. At the 2020 census, its population was 3,115 and it contained 252 housing units. Most of the residents of the township are inmates at the Lincoln Correctional Center and Logan Correctional Center.

== Geography ==
According to the 2021 census gazetteer files, Broadwell Township has a total area of 33.43 square miles (86.58 km^{2}), of which 32.93 square miles (85.29 km^{2}) (or 98.50%) is land and 0.50 square miles (1.29 km^{2}) (or 1.50%) is water.

== Demographics ==
As of the 2020 census there were 3,115 people, 310 households, and 238 families residing in the township. The population density was 93.18 inhabitants per square mile (35.98/km^{2}). There were 252 housing units at an average density of 7.54 per square mile (2.91/km^{2}). The racial makeup of the township was 54.93% White, 34.03% African American, 0.32% Native American, 0.35% Asian, 0.00% Pacific Islander, 9.02% from other races, and 1.35% from two or more races. Hispanic or Latino of any race were 9.60% of the population.

There were 310 households, out of which 23.20% had children under the age of 18 living with them, 70.32% were married couples living together, 3.87% had a female householder with no spouse present, and 23.23% were non-families. 17.10% of all households were made up of individuals, and 6.80% had someone living alone who was 65 years of age or older. The average household size was 2.47 and the average family size was 2.77.

According to the 2020 American Community Survey, township's age distribution consisted of 4.0% under the age of 18, 7.4% from 18 to 24, 54.7% from 25 to 44, 28.2% from 45 to 64, and 5.7% who were 65 years of age or older. The median age was 38.3 years. For every 100 females, there were 71.2 males. For every 100 females age 18 and over, there were 69.9 males.

The median income for a household in the township was $72,778, and the median income for a family was $88,214. Males had a median income of $42,107 versus $35,875 for females. The per capita income for the township was $8,757. About 12.2% of families and 13.3% of the population were below the poverty line, including 24.1% of those under age 18 and 11.3% of those age 65 or over.

Historical population
Census	Pop.	Note	%±
2000	2,961		—
2010	3,549		19.9%
2020	3,115		−12.2%
U.S. Decennial Census
